= 1947 =

1947 in various calendars
- Gregorian calendar: 1947; MCMXLVII
- Ab urbe condita: 2700
- Armenian calendar: 1396; ԹՎ ՌՅՂԶ
- Assyrian calendar: 6697
- Baháʼí calendar: 103–104
- Balinese saka calendar: 1868–1869
- Bengali calendar: 1353–1354
- Berber calendar: 2897
- British Regnal year: 11 Geo. 6 – 12 Geo. 6
- Buddhist calendar: 2491
- Burmese calendar: 1309
- Byzantine calendar: 7455–7456
- Chinese calendar: 丙戌年 (Fire Dog); 4644 or 4437 — to — 丁亥年 (Fire Pig); 4645 or 4438
- Coptic calendar: 1663–1664
- Discordian calendar: 3113
- Ethiopian calendar: 1939–1940
- Hebrew calendar: 5707–5708
- Hindu calendars
- Vikram Samvat: 2003–2004
- Shaka Samvat: 1868–1869
- Kali Yuga: 5047–5048
- Holocene calendar: 11947
- Igbo calendar: 947–948
- Iranian calendar: 1325–1326
- Islamic calendar: 1366–1367
- Japanese calendar: Shōwa 22 (昭和２２年)
- Javanese calendar: 1878–1879
- Juche calendar: 36
- Julian calendar: Gregorian minus 13 days
- Korean calendar: 4280
- Minguo calendar: ROC 36 民國36年
- Nanakshahi calendar: 479
- Thai solar calendar: 2490
- Tibetan calendar: མེ་ཕོ་ཁྱི་ལོ་ (male Fire-Dog); 2073 or 1692 or 920 — to — མེ་མོ་ཕག་ལོ་ (female Fire-Boar); 2074 or 1693 or 921

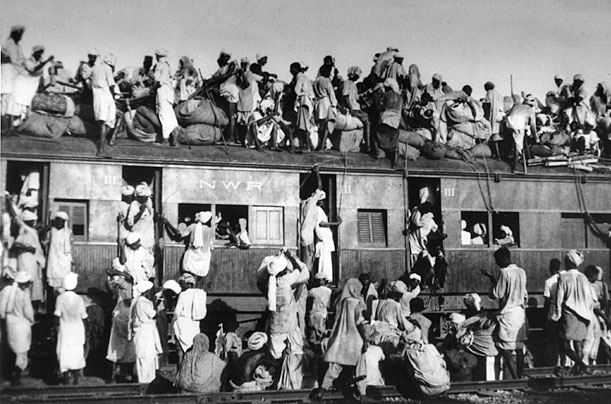
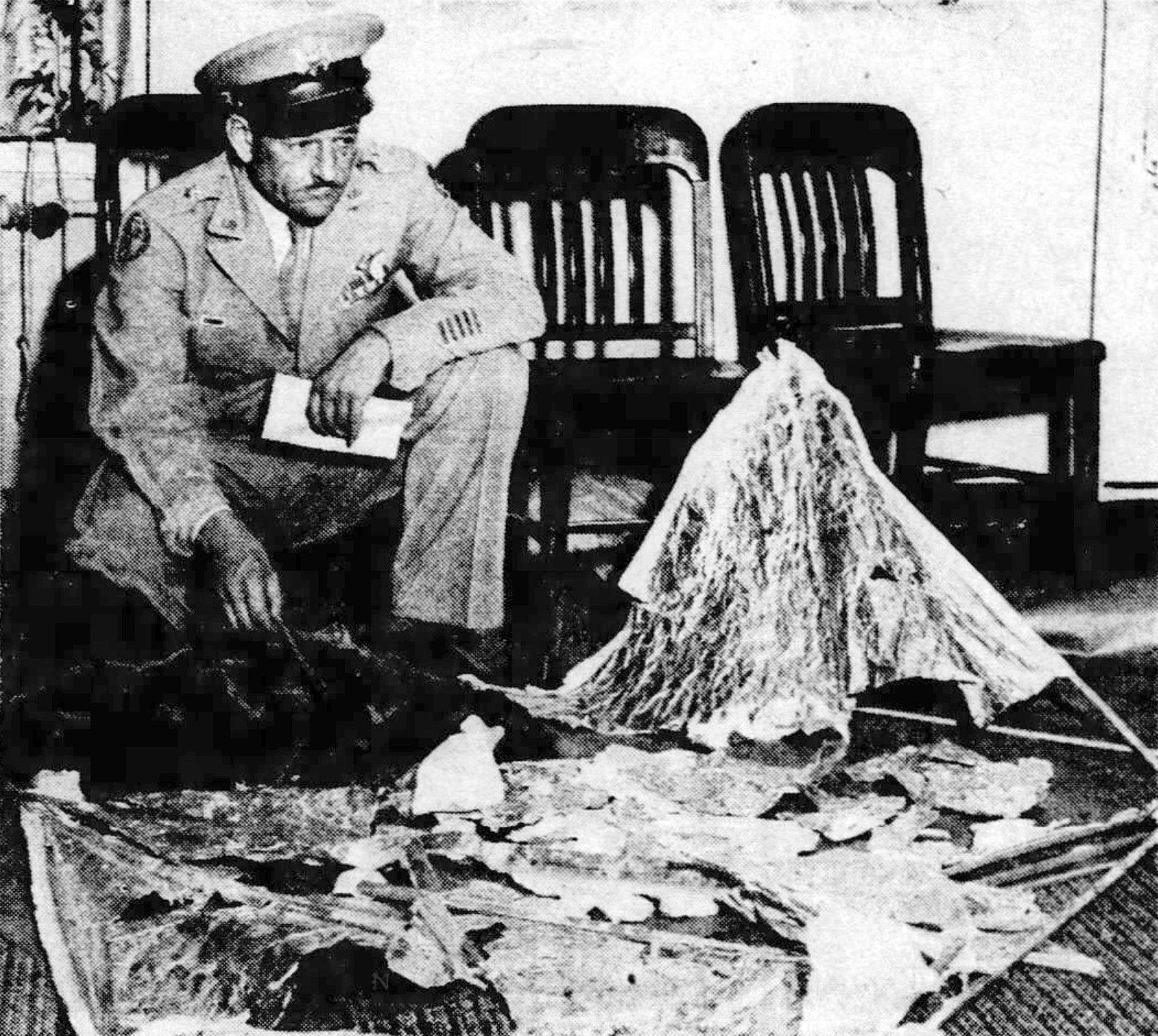
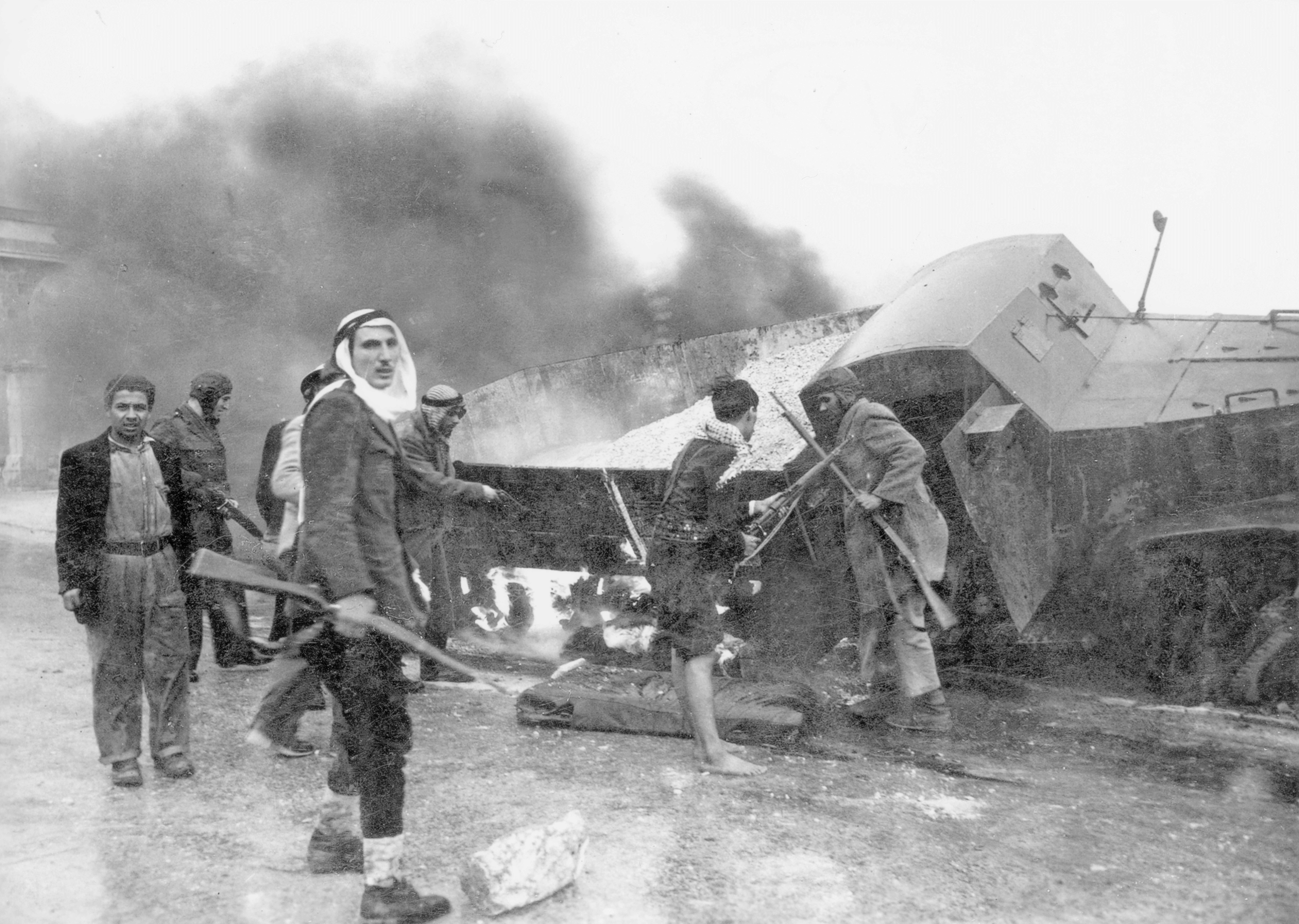
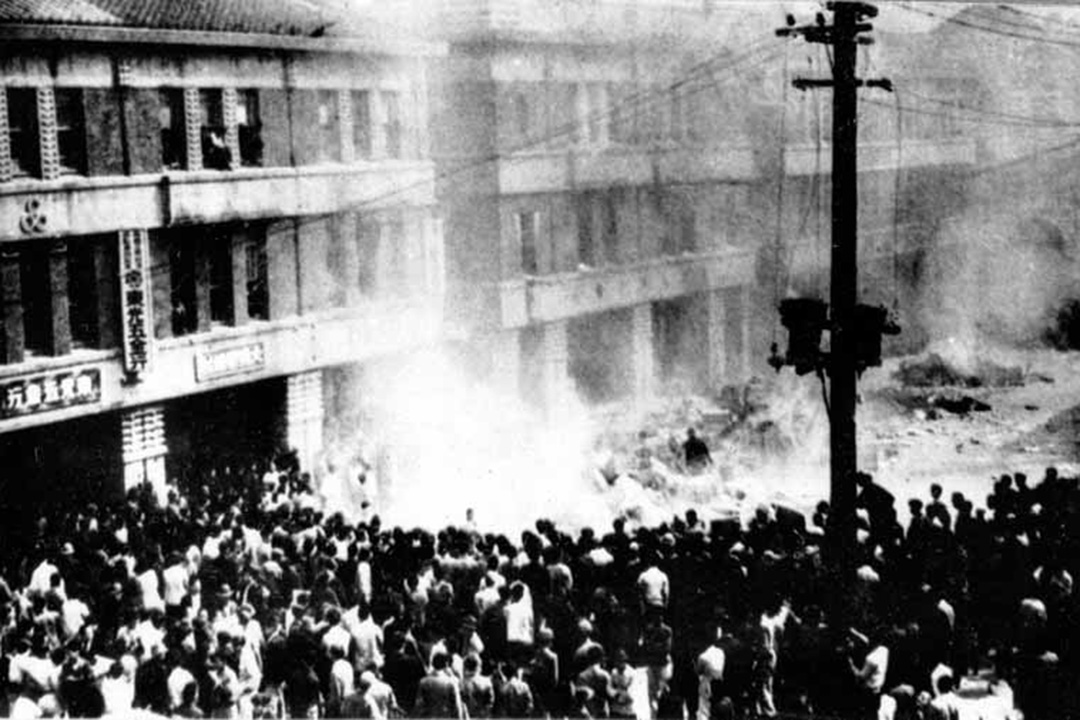
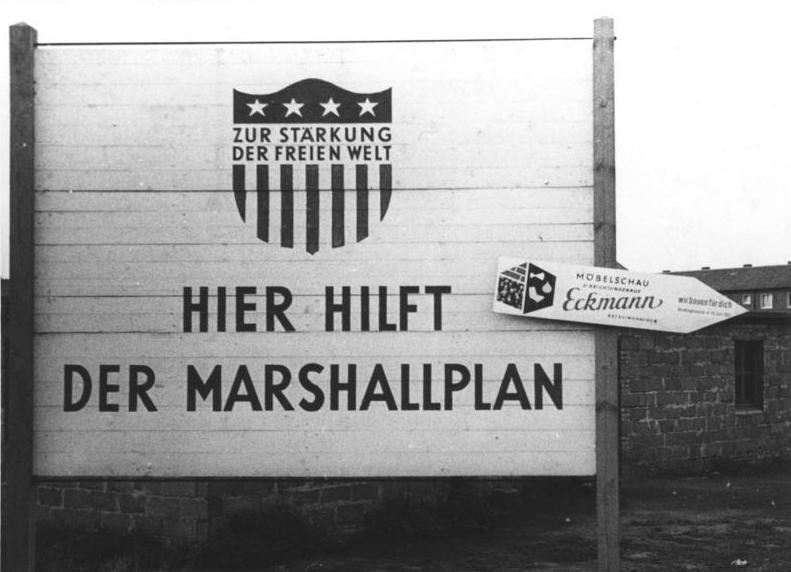
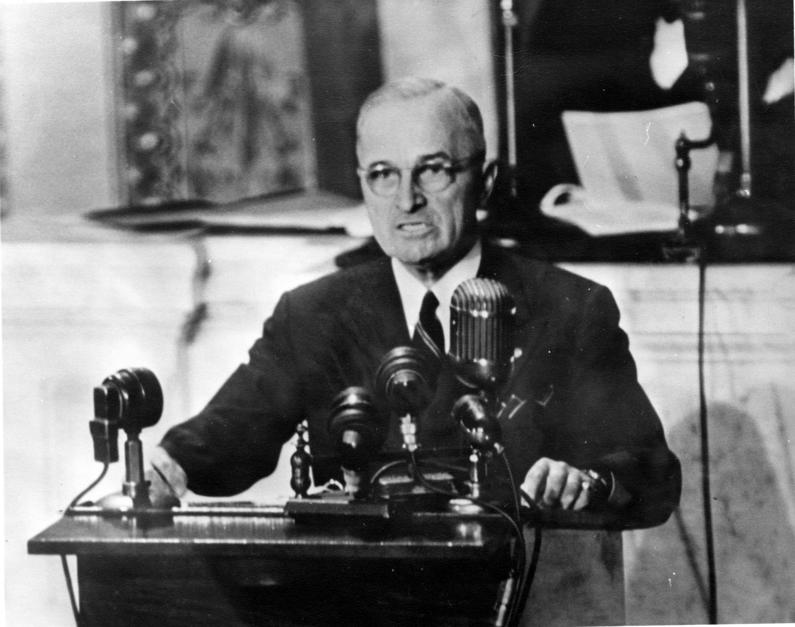
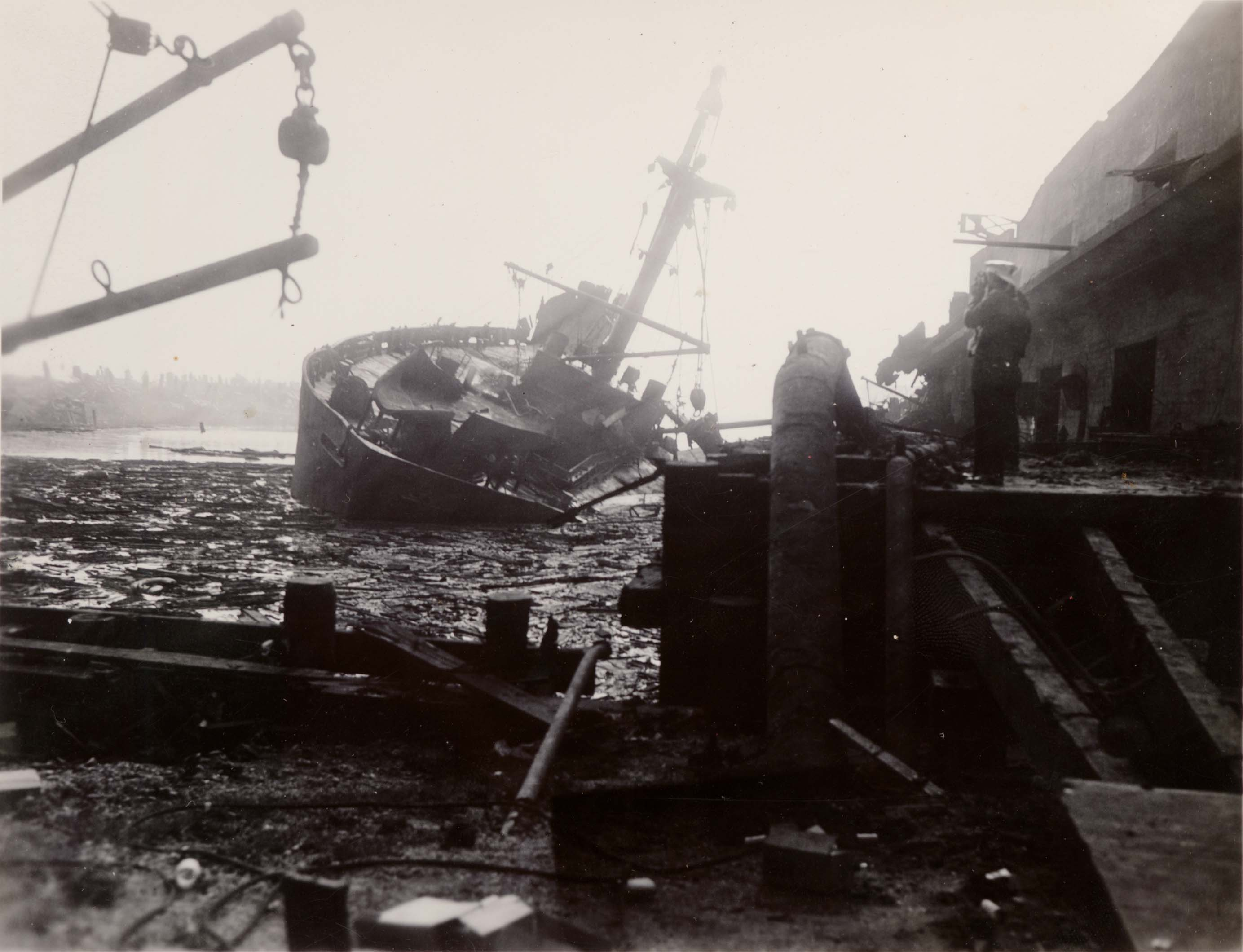
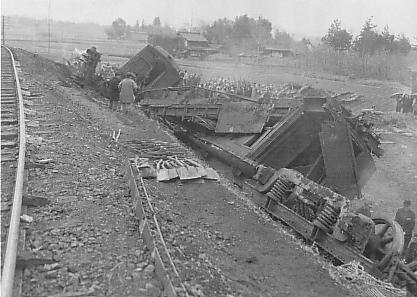
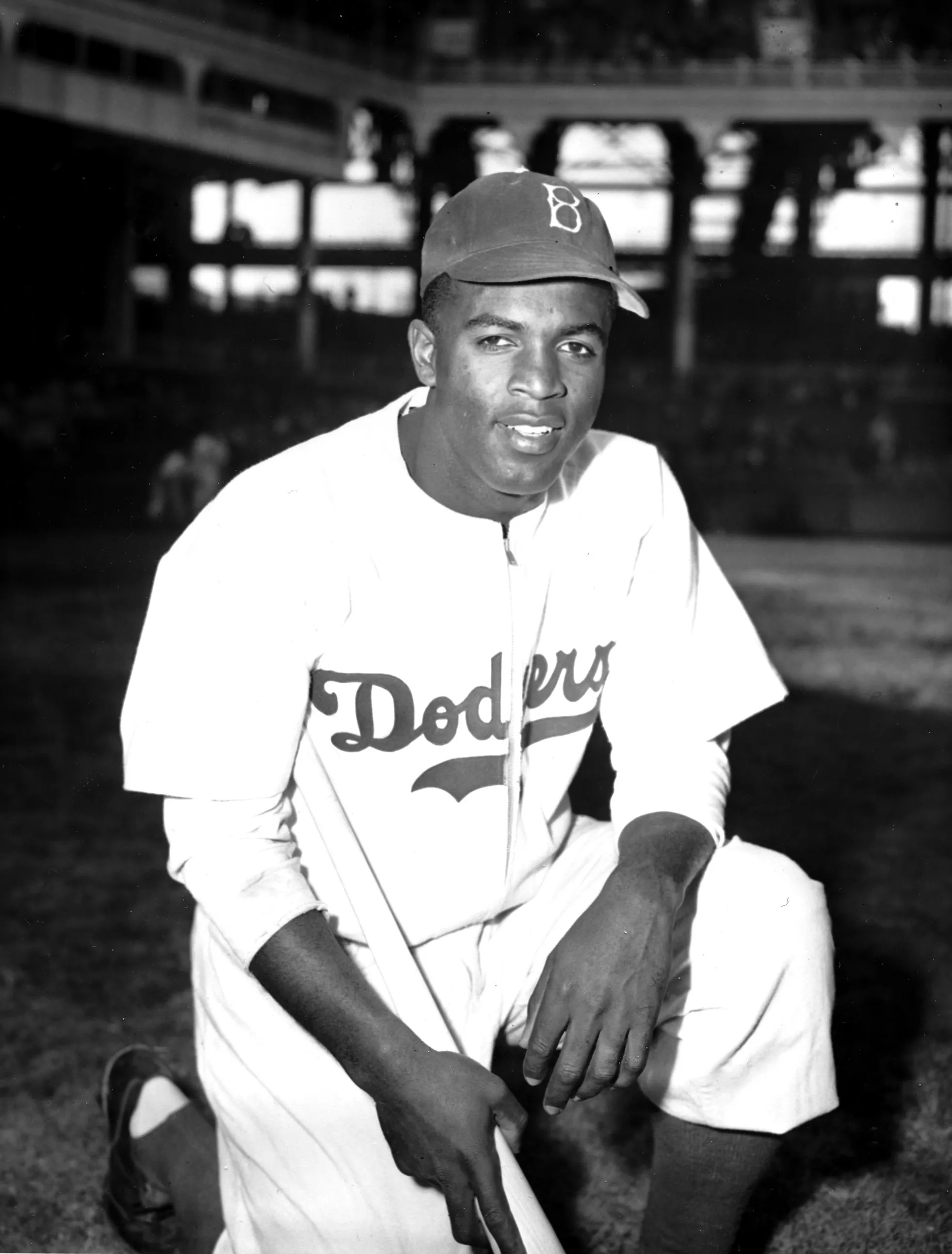
From top to bottom, left to right:
- The Partition of India creates India and Pakistan, sparking mass migrations, violence, and the Indo-Pakistani War of 1947–1948 over Kashmir;
- The Roswell incident and the 1947 flying disc craze fuel UFO speculation;
- The 1947–1948 civil war in Mandatory Palestine escalates after the UN Partition Plan for Palestine;
- The February 28 incident in Taiwan is violently suppressed, killing 18,000–28,000 and leading to decades of martial law;
- The Marshall Plan offers U.S. aid to rebuild Europe and counter Soviet influence;
- The Truman Doctrine commits the U.S. to support nations threatened by communism, marking the start of the Cold War;
- The Texas City disaster kills at least 581 people in a massive explosion;
- The Hachikō Line derailment kills 184 in Japan;
- Jackie Robinson breaks Major League Baseball’s color barrier with the Brooklyn Dodgers.

1947 (MCMXLVII) was a common year starting on Wednesday of the Gregorian calendar, the 1947th year of the Common Era (CE) and Anno Domini (AD) designations, the 947th year of the 2nd millennium, the 47th year of the 20th century, and the 8th year of the 1940s decade.

It was the first year of the Cold War, which would last until 1991, ending with the dissolution of the Soviet Union.

== Events ==
=== January ===
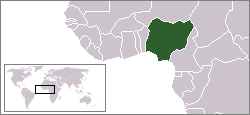
January 1: Nigeria gains autonomy.

- January–February — Winter of 1946–47 in the United Kingdom: The worst snowfall in the country in the 20th century causes extensive disruption of travel. Given the low ratio of private vehicle ownership at the time, it is mainly remembered in terms of its effects on the railway network.
- January 1 – The Canadian Citizenship Act comes into effect, providing a Canadian citizenship separate from British law.
- January 4 – First issue of weekly magazine Der Spiegel published in Hanover, Germany, edited by Rudolf Augstein.
- January 10 – The United Nations adopts a resolution to take control of the free city of Trieste.
- January 11 – The Afghan tribal revolts of 1944–1947 conclude with the Surrender at Datta Khel.
- January 13 – The last of hundreds of concentration camps in Francoist Spain, Miranda de Ebro, shuts down.
- January 15 – Elizabeth Short, an aspiring actress nicknamed the "Black Dahlia", is found brutally murdered in a vacant lot in Los Angeles; the mysterious case is never solved.
- January 16 – Vincent Auriol is inaugurated as president of France.
- January 19 – Ferry SS Heimara sinks in the South Euboean Gulf of Greece killing 392.
- January 24 – In the third phase of the Greek Civil War, Dimitrios Maximos forms a monarchist government in Athens and begins a brief term as prime minister.
- January 26 – A KLM Douglas DC-3 aircraft crashes soon after taking off from Kastrup Airport, Copenhagen, killing all 22 people on board, including Prince Gustaf Adolf, second in line to the Swedish throne, and American opera singer Grace Moore.

=== February ===
- February 3
  - The lowest air temperature in North America (−63 degrees Celsius) was recorded in Snag, in the Yukon Territory.
  - P.L. Prattis becomes the first African American news correspondent allowed in the United States House of Representatives and Senate press galleries.
- February 5
  - Bolesław Bierut becomes the President of Poland.
  - The Government of the United Kingdom announces the £25 million Tanganyika groundnut scheme, for cultivation of peanuts in the Tanganyika Territory.
- February 7 – The South Pacific Commission (SPC) is founded.
- February 8 – The Karlslust dance hall fire in Berlin, Germany, kills over 80 people.
- February 10 – In Paris, France, peace treaties are signed between the World War II Allies and Italy, Hungary, Romania, Bulgaria and Finland. Italy cedes most of Istria to the Socialist Federal Republic of Yugoslavia (later Croatia).
- February 12
  - The fragments of a meteorite create a number of impact craters up to 36 metres wide in Sikhote-Alin, in the Soviet Union.
  - In Burma, the Panglong Agreement is reached between the Burmese government under its leader, General Aung San, and the Shan, Kachin, and Chin ethnic peoples at the Panglong Conference. U Aung Zan Wai, Pe Khin, Major Aung, Sir Maung Gyi, Sein Mya Maung and Myoma U Than Kywe are among the negotiators.
- February 17 – Cold War: The Voice of America begins to transmit radio broadcasts into Eastern Europe and the Soviet Union
- February 20
  - An explosion at the O'Connor Electro-Plating Company in Los Angeles leaves 17 dead, 100 buildings damaged, and a 22-foot-deep (6.7 m) crater in the ground.
  - The U.S. Army Ordnance Corps Hermes program V-2 rocket Blossom I is launched into space, carrying plant material and fruitflies, the first living things to enter space.
- February 21 – Edwin Land demonstrates the first "instant camera", his Polaroid Land Camera, to a meeting of the Optical Society of America in New York City.
- February 23 – The International Organization for Standardization (ISO) is founded.
- February 25
  - The German state of Prussia is officially abolished, by the Allied Control Council.
  - Hachikō Line derailment: The worst-ever train accident in Japan kills 184 people.
  - John C. Hennessy Jr. brings the first Volkswagen Beetle to the United States. He purchased the 1946 automobile from the U.S. Army Post Exchange in Frankfurt, Germany, while serving in the U.S. Army. The Beetle is shipped from Bremerhaven, arriving in New York this day.
- February 28 – In Taiwan, civil disorder is put down, with large loss of civilian lives.

=== March ===
- March 1
  - The International Monetary Fund begins to operate.
  - German rocket scientist Wernher von Braun marries his first cousin, 18-year-old Maria von Quirstorp.
- March 4 – The Treaty of Dunkirk (effective September 8) is signed between the United Kingdom and France, providing for mutual assistance in the event of attack.
- March 12 – The Cold War begins: The Truman Doctrine is proclaimed, to help stem the spread of Communism.
- March 14 – The Thames flood and other widespread flooding occurs, as the exceptionally harsh British winter of 1946–1947 ends in a thaw.
- March 15 – Hindus and Muslims clash in Punjab.
- March 19 – The 19th Academy Awards Ceremony is held. The movie The Best Years of Our Lives wins the Academy Award for Best Picture, along with several other Academy Awards.
- March 25 – A coal mine explosion in Centralia, Illinois, United States; 111 miners are killed.
- March 28 – A World War II Japanese booby trap explodes on Corregidor Island, killing 28 people.
- March 29 – A rebellion against French rule erupts in Madagascar.
- March 31 – The leaders of the Kurdish People's Republic of Mahabad, the second Kurdish state in the history of Iran, are hanged at Chuwarchira Square in Mahabad, after the state has been overrun by the Iranian army.

=== April ===
- April – The previous discovery of the 'Dead Sea Scrolls' in the Qumran Caves (above the northwest shore of the Dead Sea) by Bedouin shepherds, becomes known.
- April 1
  - Jackie Robinson, the first African American in Major League Baseball since the 1880s, signs a contract with the Brooklyn Dodgers.
  - Paul I becomes King of Greece, aged 45, following the death of his brother, King George II.
  - The 1947 Royal New Zealand Navy mutinies begin.
- April 4 – The International Civil Aviation Organization begins operations.
- April 7
  - The Arab Ba'ath Party is established by merger in Damascus.
  - The largest recorded sunspot group appears on the solar surface.
- April 9
  - Multiple tornadoes strike Texas, Oklahoma and Kansas, killing 184 and injuring 970.
  - The Journey of Reconciliation in the Southern United States begins, organized by the Congress of Racial Equality.
- April 15 – Jackie Robinson becomes the first African American to play Major League Baseball since the 1880s.
- April 16
  - Texas City disaster: The ammonium nitrate cargo of French-registered Liberty ship SS Grandcamp explodes in Texas City, Texas in one of the largest man-made non-nuclear explosions in history, killing at least 581, including all but one member of the city fire department, injuring at least 5,000 and destroying 20 city blocks. Of the dead, remains of 113 are never found, and 62 are unidentifiable.
  - American financier and presidential adviser Bernard Baruch describes the post–World War II tensions between the Soviet Union and the United States as a "Cold War".
  - The first public demonstration of a TV camera zoom lens, the Jerry Fairbanks Zoomar, is held at NBC studios in New York.
- April 18
  - The British Royal Navy detonates 6,800 tons of explosives, in an attempt to demolish the fortified island of Heligoland, Germany, in another of the largest man-made non-nuclear explosions in history.
  - 'Mrs. Ples', an Australopithecus africanus skull, is discovered in the Sterkfontein area in Transvaal, South Africa.
- April 20 – King Frederik IX succeeds his father, Christian X, on the throne of Denmark.

=== May ===
- May 1 – Portella della Ginestra massacre: The Salvatore Giuliano gang of Sicilian separatists opens fire on a Labour Day parade at Portella della Ginestra, Sicily, killing 11 people and wounding 27.
- May 2 – The movie Miracle on 34th Street, a Christmastime classic, is first shown in theaters.
- May 3 – The new post-war Constitution of Japan goes into effect.
- May 11
  - The Kingdom of Laos is officially formed, but is still a French protectorate.
  - The Ferrari 125 S, the first car to bear the Ferrari name, debuts.
- May 22 – To fight the spread of Communism, President Harry S. Truman signs an Act of Congress that implements the Truman Doctrine. This Act grants $400 million in military and economic aid to Turkey and Greece.
- May 25 – Hyundai Togun, the initial name of the Hyundai Group, is founded by Chung Ju-young.
- May 29
  - An Air Iceland Douglas C-47 on a domestic flight in Iceland crashes into a mountainside killing all 25 people on board.
  - A United States Army Air Forces Douglas C-54 Skymaster crashes on approach to Naval Air Station Atsugi, Japan, killing all 41 on board in the worst aviation accident in Japanese history up to this time.
- May 30 – Eastern Air Lines Flight 605: A Douglas C-54 Skymaster crashes near Bainbridge, Maryland, killing all 53 aboard (49 passengers, 4 crew), in America's worst commercial aviation disaster to this date.
- May 31 – Alcide de Gasperi forms a new government in Italy, the first postwar Italian government not to include members of the Italian Communist Party.

=== June ===
- June – The Doomsday Clock of the Bulletin of the Atomic Scientists is introduced.
- June 5 – U.S. Secretary of State George Marshall outlines the Marshall Plan for American reconstruction and relief aid to Europe, in a speech at Harvard University.
- June 7 – The Romanian Army founds the association football club CCA (Clubul Central al Armatei – The Army's Central Club), which will become the most successful Romanian football team during its time as CSA Steaua București.
- June 10 – SAAB in Sweden produces its first automobile.
- June 11–15 – The first Llangollen International Musical Eisteddfod is held in Wales.
- June 15 – The Estado Novo in Portugal orders 11 military officers and 19 university professors, who are accused of revolutionary activity, to resign.
- June 21 – The Parliament of Canada votes unanimously to pass several laws regarding displaced foreign refugees.
- June 23 – The United States Senate follows the House of Representatives, in overriding President Harry S. Truman's veto of the Taft–Hartley Act.
- June 24 – Kenneth Arnold makes the first widely reported UFO sighting near Mount Rainier, Washington. Over 800 copycat sightings are reported throughout the US in the coming following weeks.
- June 25 – The Diary of a Young Girl by Anne Frank is published for the first time as Het Achterhuis: Dagboekbrieven 14 juni 1942 – 1 augustus 1944 ("The Annex: Diary Notes from 14 June 1942 – 1 August 1944") in Amsterdam, two years after the writer's death in Bergen-Belsen concentration camp.

=== July ===
- July 1 – The United States begins the National Malaria Eradication Program, successfully eradicating malaria in 1951.
- July 6
  - 1947 Sylhet referendum: A referendum is held in Sylhet to decide its fate in the Partition of India.
  - The first prototype AK-47 assault rifles are built to the design of Mikhail Kalashnikov.
- July 8 – Roswell UFO incident: A supposedly downed extraterrestrial spacecraft is reportedly found near Roswell, New Mexico.

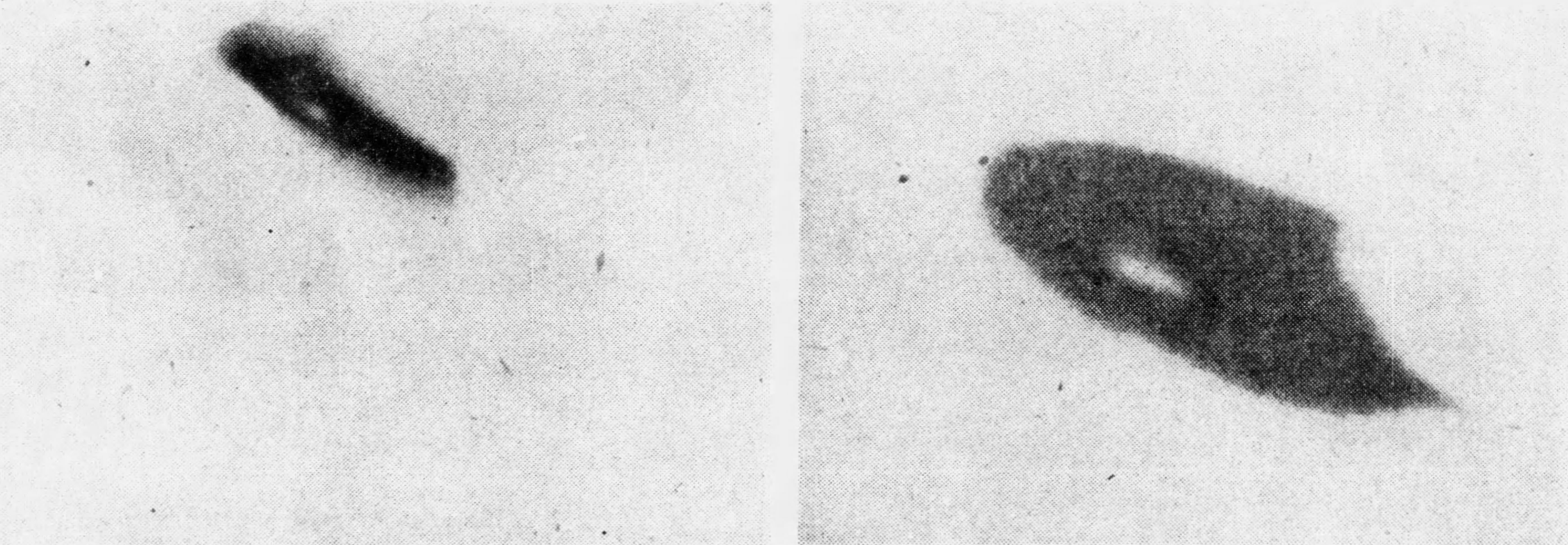
'Flying Disc' photos published in Phoenix press on July 9

- July 9
  - 'Flying disc' photographs published in Phoenix
  - King George VI of the United Kingdom announces the engagement of his daughter Princess Elizabeth to Lt. Philip Mountbatten.
- July 11 – The ship Exodus leaves France for Palestine, with 4,500 Jewish Holocaust survivor refugees on board.
- July 17 – Indian passenger ship SS Ramdas is capsized by a cyclone at Mumbai, India, with 625 people killed.
- July 18
  - Following wide media and UNSCOP coverage, the Exodus is captured by British troops, and refused entry into Palestine at the port of Haifa.
  - President Harry S. Truman signs the Presidential Succession Act into law, which places the Speaker of the House and the President pro tempore of the Senate next in the line of succession, after the vice president.
- July 19 – Burmese nationalist Aung San, and six members of his newly formed cabinet, are assassinated during a cabinet meeting.
- July 26 – Cold War: U.S. President Harry S. Truman signs the National Security Act of 1947 into law to create the Central Intelligence Agency, the Department of Defense, the Joint Chiefs of Staff, and the National Security Council.
- July 27–28 – English endurance swimmer Tom Blower becomes the first person to swim the North Channel, from Donaghadee in Northern Ireland to Portpatrick in Scotland.
- July 29 – After being shut down on November 9, 1946, for a refurbishment, the ENIAC computer in the United States is turned back on again, and remains in continuous operation until October 2, 1955.

=== August ===
Flag of Pakistan, the country that gained independence on August 14, 1947

Flag of India, the country that gained independence on August 15, 1947, and became the largest democracy in the world.

- August 1 – Indonesian airline Garuda Indonesia is established.
- August 2 – 1947 BSAA Avro Lancastrian Star Dust accident: A British South American Airways Avro Lancastrian airliner crashes into a mountain during a flight from Buenos Aires, Argentina to Santiago, Chile (the wreckage will not be found until 1998).
- August 5 – The Netherlands ends Operation Product, the first of its major military Police Actions in Indonesia.
- August 7
  - Thor Heyerdahl's balsa wood raft, the Kon-Tiki, smashes into the reef at Raroia in the Tuamotu Islands, after a 101-day, 4,300 mile, voyage across the Eastern Pacific Ocean, demonstrating that prehistoric peoples could have traveled to the Central Pacific islands from South America.
  - The Bombay Municipal Corporation formally takes over the Bombay Electric Supply and Transport (BEST).
- August 14
  - The Muslim majority regions formed by the Partition of India gain independence from the British Empire as the Dominion of Pakistan. While the transition is officially at midnight on this day, Pakistan celebrates its independence on August 14, compared with India on the 15th, because the Pakistan Standard Time is 30 minutes behind the standard time of India.
  - Muhammad Ali Jinnah becomes the first governor-general of Pakistan. Liaquat Ali Khan takes office as the first prime minister of Pakistan.
- August 15
  - The greater Indian subcontinent, with a mixed population of Hindu, Sikhs, Buddhists, Jains, Zoroasters, Jews, Christians, Muslims and others formed by the Partition of India, gains independence from the British Empire, as the Dominion of India. 190 years British rule (1757–1947) in India comes to an end.
  - Jawaharlal Nehru takes office as the first prime minister of India, taking his oath from Louis Mountbatten, Viscount Mountbatten of Burma, Governor-General of India (but no longer viceroy).
- August 16 – In Greece, General Markos Vafiadis takes over the government until 1949.
- August 23 – The prime minister of Greece, Dimitrios Maximos, resigns.
- August 27 – The French government lowers the daily bread ration to 200 grams, causing riots in Verdun and Le Mans.
- August 30 – A fire at a movie theater in Rueil, a suburb of Paris, France, kills 83 people.
- August 31 – In Hungary, communists fail to gain a majority in the 1947 Hungarian parliamentary election (despite widespread fraud) and turn to direct action as part of the country's transition to Communism (1944–1949).

=== September ===
The Central Intelligence Agency (CIA), officially born September 18, 1947

- September 9
  - Women's suffrage is agreed by Argentina's Congress.
  - A moth lodged in a relay is found to be the cause of a malfunction in the Harvard Mark II electromechanical computer, logged as the "First actual case of bug being found."
- September 13 – Indian Prime Minister Jawaharlal Nehru suggests the exchange of four million Hindus and Muslims between India and Pakistan.
- September 15–16 – Typhoon Kathleen strikes the Bōsō Peninsula and the entire Kantō region in Japan. Heavy rains cause the Arakawa and Tone Rivers to overflow and embankment collapse. The resulting floods and debris flow kill between 1,077 and 1,920 people, injuring 1,547 and leaving 853 missing.
- September 17–21 – The 1947 Fort Lauderdale hurricane in southeastern Florida, and also in Alabama, Mississippi, and Louisiana causes widespread damage, and kills 50 people.
- September 18 – In the United States:
  - The National Security Act of 1947 becomes effective on this day, creating the United States Air Force, National Security Council and the Central Intelligence Agency.
  - The Department of War becomes the Department of the Army, a branch of the new Department of Defense.
- September 22 – The Information Bureau of the Communist and Workers' Parties (Cominform) is founded by the International Communist Movement.
- September 30 – Pakistan and Yemen join the United Nations.

=== October ===
- October – First recorded use of the word computer in its modern sense, referring to an electronic digital machine.
- October 1 – The North American F-86 Sabre jet fighter aircraft makes its first flight.
- October 5 – President Harry S. Truman delivers the first televised White House address, speaking on the world food crises.
- October 14 – United States Air Force test pilot Captain Chuck Yeager flies a Bell X-1 rocket plane faster than the speed of sound, the first time it has been accomplished.
- October 20 – A war begins in Kashmir, along the border between India and Pakistan, initiating the Indo-Pakistani War of 1947–1948. Also, Pakistan establishes diplomatic relations with the United States of America.
- October 24 – The first Azad Kashmir Government is established within Pakistan, headed by Sardar Muhammad Ibrahim Khan as its first President supported by the government of Pakistan.
- October 30 – The General Agreement on Tariffs and Trade (GATT), the foundation of the World Trade Organization (WTO), is established.

=== November ===
- November 2 – In Long Beach, California, United States, designer and airplane pilot Howard Hughes carries out the one and only flight of the Hughes H-4 Hercules ("Spruce Goose"), the largest fixed-wing aircraft ever built and flown. This flight only lasts 8 minutes.
- November 6 – The television program Meet the Press makes its debut, on the NBC-TV network in the United States.
- November 9 – Junagadh is invaded by the Indian army.
- November 10 – The arrest of four steel workers in Marseille begins a French communist riot, that also spreads to Paris.
- November 13 – Wataru Misaka makes the roster of the New York Knicks to become the first person of color to play in modern professional basketball, months after Jackie Robinson broke the color barrier in Major League Baseball for the Brooklyn Dodgers. Misaka has led the Utah Utes to the 1944 NCAA and 1947 NIT championships.
- November 15
  - The International Telecommunication Union becomes a specialized agency of the United Nations.
  - The Universal Postal Union becomes a specialized agency of the United Nations (effective July 1 1948).
- November 16
  - In Brussels, 15,000 people demonstrate against the relatively short prison sentences of Belgian Nazi criminals.
  - Great Britain begins withdrawing its troops from Palestine.
- November 17–December 23 – John Bardeen and Walter Brattain working under William Shockley at AT&T's Bell Labs in the United States demonstrate the transistor effect, a key element for the electronics revolution of the 20th century.
- November 17 – The Screen Actors Guild implements an anti-Communist loyalty oath.
- November 18 – Ballantyne's fire: A fire in Ballantynes department store in Christchurch, New Zealand, kills 41 people.
- November 20
  - Wedding of Princess Elizabeth and Philip Mountbatten, Duke of Edinburgh: Princess Elizabeth (later Elizabeth II), the daughter of George VI of the United Kingdom, marries The Duke of Edinburgh at Westminster Abbey in London.
  - Paul Ramadier resigns as Prime Minister of France. He is succeeded by Robert Schuman, who calls in 80,000 army reservists to quell rioting miners in France.
- November 21 – The United Nations Conference on Trade and Employment begins in Havana, Cuba. This conference ends in 1948, when its members complete the Havana Charter.
- November 24 – McCarthyism: The United States House of Representatives votes 346–17 to approve citations of Contempt of Congress against the "Hollywood Ten", after the screenwriters and directors refuse to co-operate with the House Un-American Activities Committee concerning allegations of communist influences in the movie business. The ten men are blacklisted by the Hollywood movie studios on the following day.
- November 25
  - The New Zealand Parliament ratifies the Statute of Westminster, and thus becomes independent of legislative control by the Parliament of the United Kingdom.
  - The new Pakistan Army and Pashtun mercenaries overrun Mirpur in Kashmir, resulting in the death of 20,000 Hindus and Sikhs.
- November 27 – In Paris, France, police occupy the editorial offices of the communist newspapers.
- November 29 – The United Nations General Assembly votes for the United Nations Partition Plan for Palestine which will partition Mandatory Palestine between Arab and Jewish regions, resulting in the creation of the State of Israel.

=== December ===
- December 3
  - 16 are killed and about 30 injured in a train derailment in Arras, France. Authorities report that the disaster is an act of sabotage and accuse communists of being responsible in the midst of the country's ongoing labor strife.
  - The Tennessee Williams play A Streetcar Named Desire, starring Marlon Brando in his first great role, opens at the Ethel Barrymore Theatre on Broadway in New York City; Jessica Tandy also stars as Blanche Du Bois.
- December 4 – French Interior Minister Jules S. Moch takes emergency measures against his country's rioters, after six days of violent arguments in the National Assembly.
- December 6
  - Arturo Toscanini conducts a concert performance of the first half of Giuseppe Verdi's opera Otello, for a broadcast on NBC Radio in the United States. The second half of the opera is broadcast a week later.
  - Women are admitted to full membership of the University of Cambridge in England, following a vote in September.
- December 9 – French labor unions call off the general strike, and re-commence negotiations with the French government.
- December 12 – The Iranian Royal Army takes back power in the Azerbaijan province.
- December 14 – Santiago Bernabeu Stadium is officially inaugurated in Madrid, and hosts its first Association football match.
- December 21 – During the mass migration of Hindus and Muslims between the new states of India and Pakistan, 400,000 are slaughtered.
- December 22 – The Italian Constituent Assembly votes to accept the new Constitution of Italy.
- December 30
  - The Mikoyan-Gurevich MiG-15 jet fighter aircraft (NATO reporting name Fagot) makes its first flight in the Soviet Union.
  - King Michael I of Romania is forced to abdicate and the Romanian monarchy is abolished.

== Births ==
=== January ===
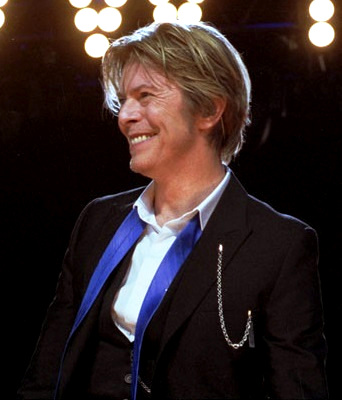
David Bowie

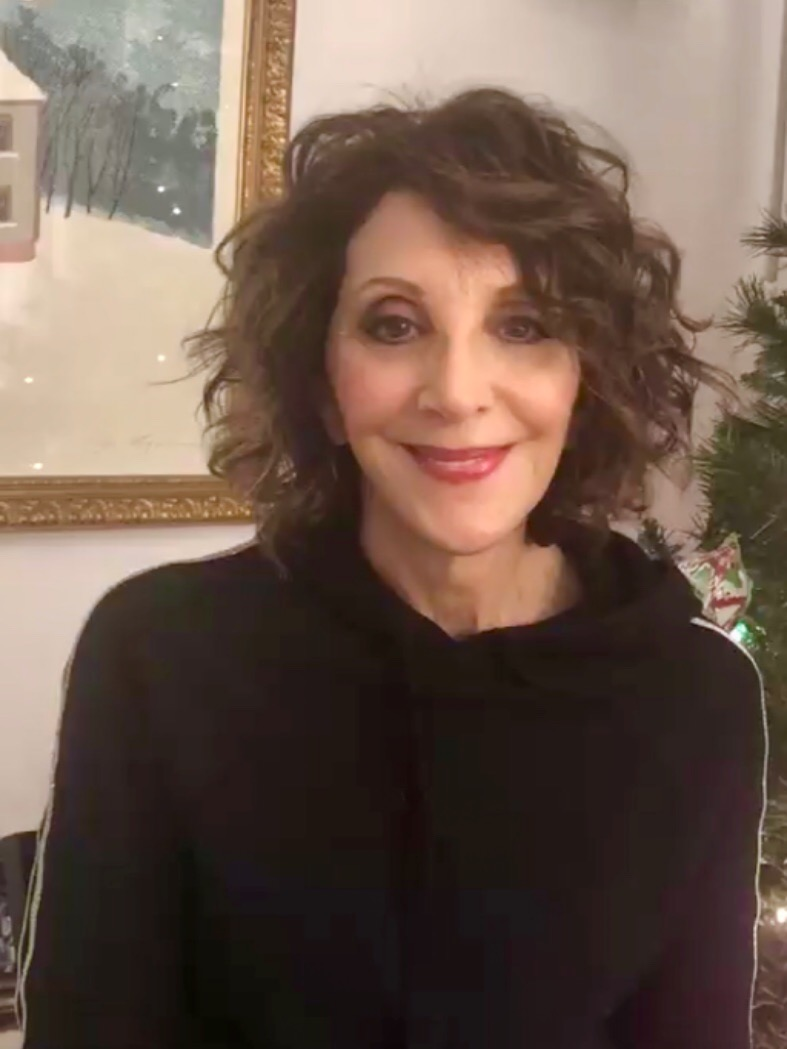
Andrea Martin

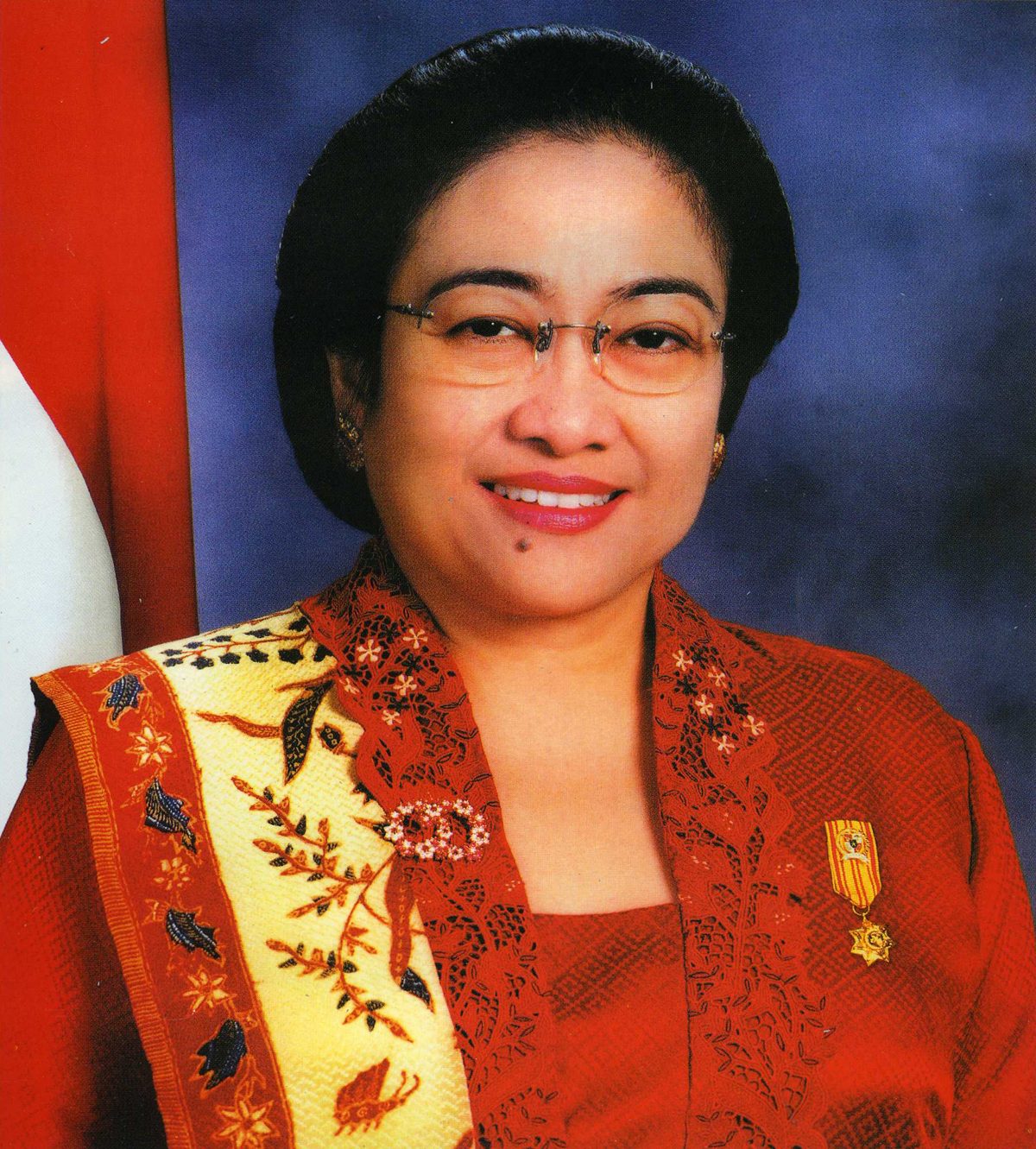
Megawati Sukarnoputri

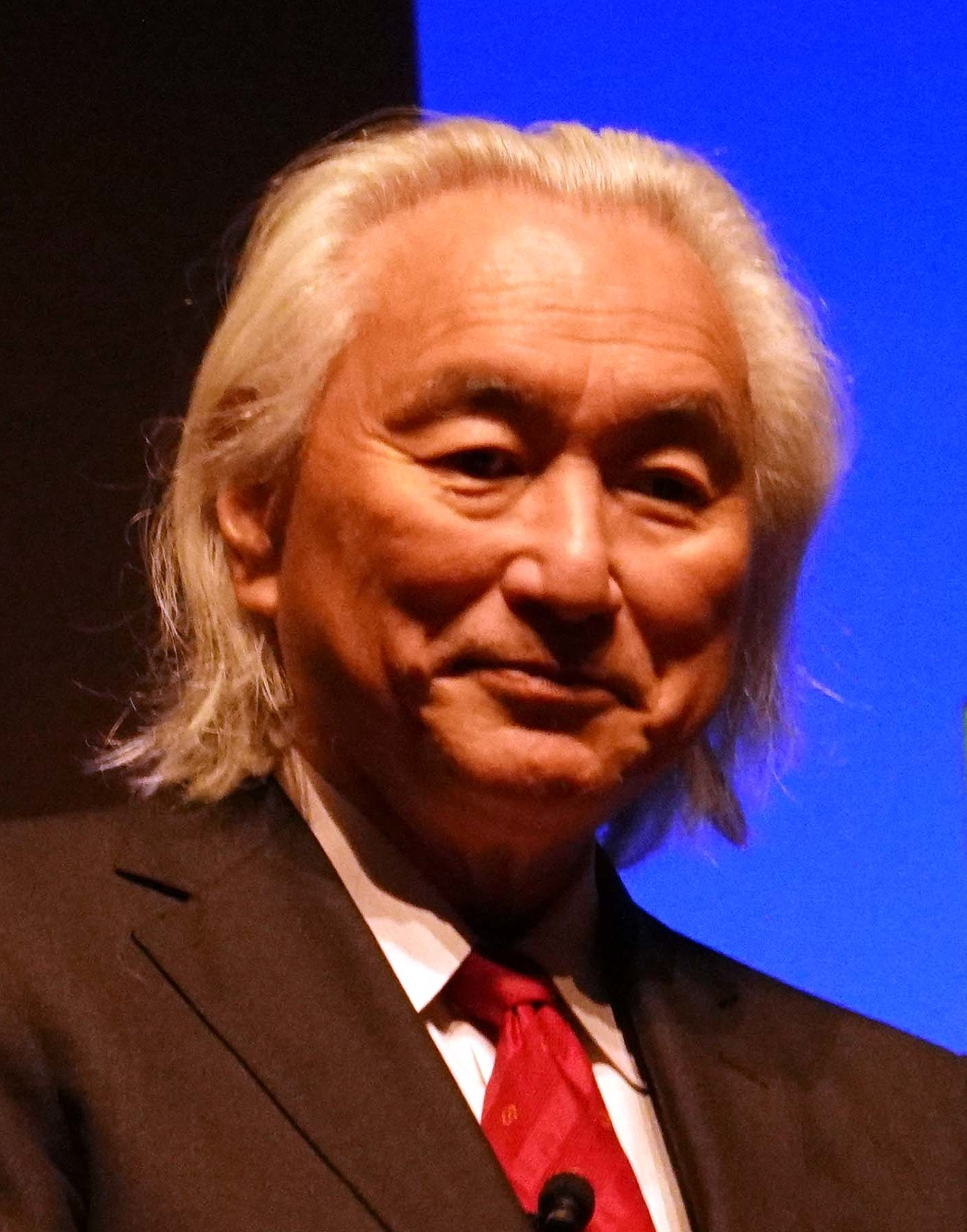
Michio Kaku

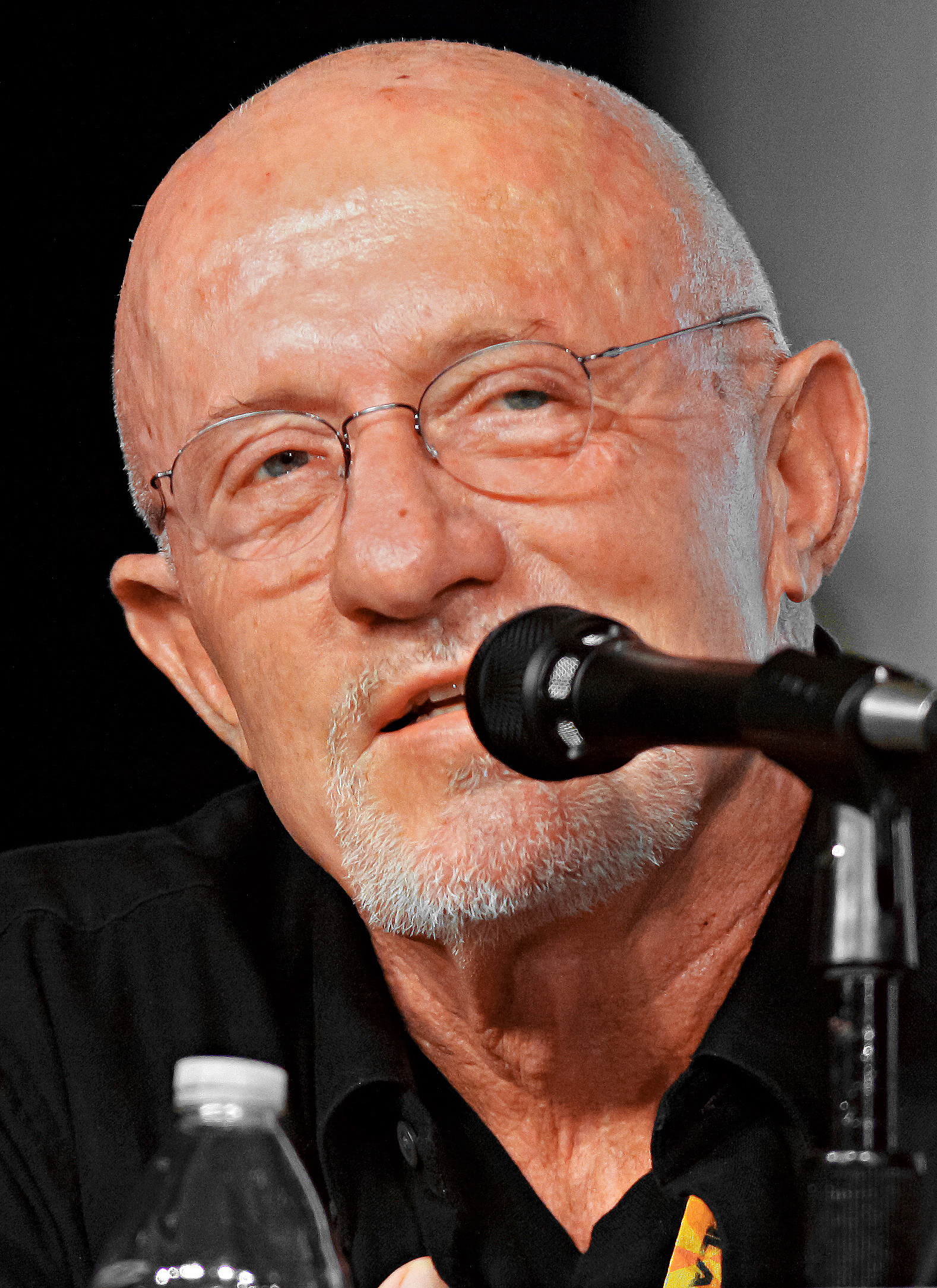
Jonathan Banks

- January 1
  - F. R. David, Tunisian-born French singer
  - Vladimir Titov, Russian cosmonaut
  - Frances Yip, Hong Kong singer
- January 2 – Jack Hanna, American Zookeeper and Television Personality (Jack Hanna's Animal Adventures)
- January 6
  - Sandy Denny, British singer (d. 1978)
  - Ian Millar, Canadian dressage rider
- January 8
  - David Bowie, English singer, songwriter, and actor (d. 2016)
  - Samuel Schmid, Swiss Federal Councillor
  - William G. Bonin, American serial killer and rapist (d. 1996)
- January 10 – Peer Steinbrück, German politician
- January 12 – Emily Stonington, American politician from Montana (d. 2019)
- January 13 – Carles Rexach, Spanish-Catalan footballer and coach
- January 15 – Andrea Martin, Canadian-American actress (Second City Television)
- January 16
  - Juliet Berto, French actress, director and screenwriter (d. 1990)
  - Apasra Hongsakula, Thai model, Miss Universe 1965
  - Harvey Proctor, British Conservative politician
- January 18 – Takeshi Kitano, Japanese film director, actor
- January 20 – Cyrille Guimard, French road racing cyclist
- January 21 – Jill Eikenberry, American actress
- January 22 – Vladimir Oravsky, Swedish writer
- January 23
  - Tom Carper, American politician
  - Megawati Sukarnoputri, 5th President of Indonesia
- January 24
  - Giorgio Chinaglia, Italian footballer (d. 2012)
  - Michio Kaku, American theoretical physicist
  - Warren Zevon, American rock musician (Werewolves of London) (d. 2003)
- January 25 – Tostão (Eduardo Gonçalves de Andrade), Brazilian footballer
- January 26 – Michel Sardou, French singer and actor
- January 27 – Björn Afzelius, Swedish singer, songwriter and guitarist (Hoola Bandoola Band) (d. 1999)
- January 28 – Jeanne Shaheen, US Senator
- January 29 – Linda B. Buck, American biologist, recipient of the Nobel Prize in Physiology or Medicine
- January 30 – Steve Marriott, British rock musician (d. 1991)
- January 31
  - Jonathan Banks, American actor
  - Nolan Ryan, American baseball pitcher

=== February ===
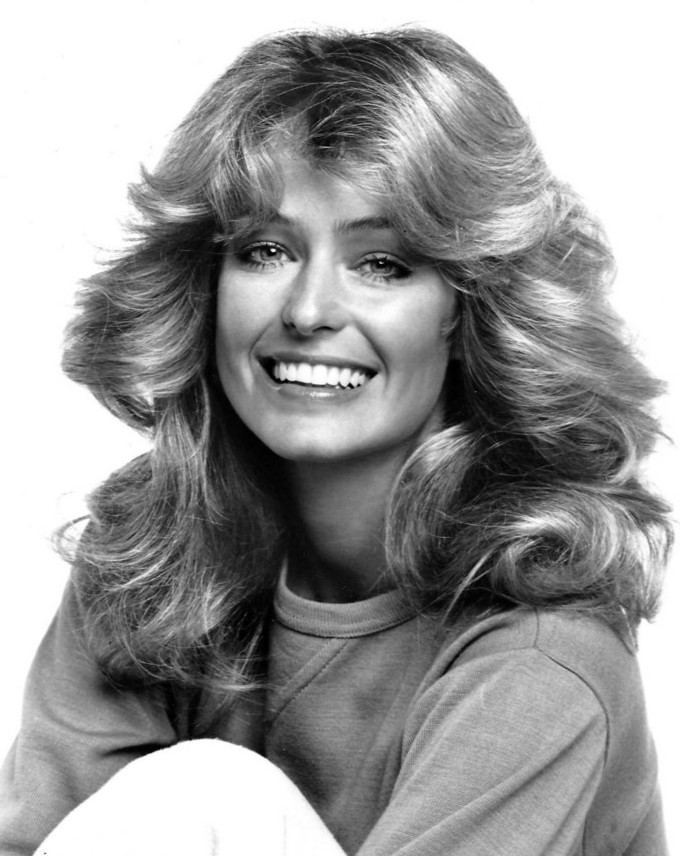
Farrah Fawcett

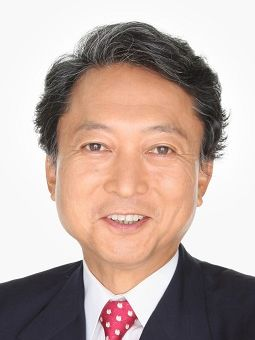
Yukio Hatoyama

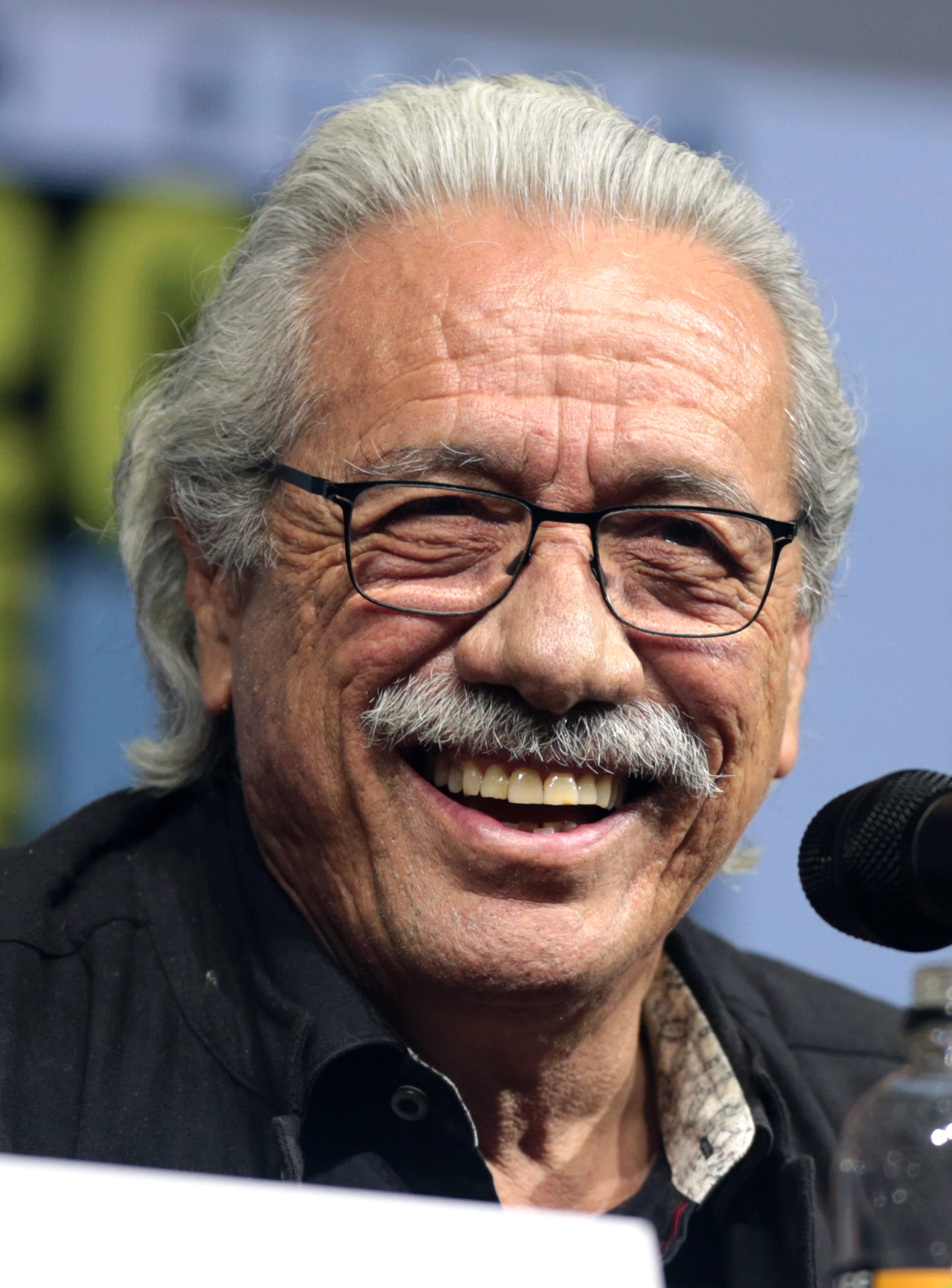
Edward James Olmos

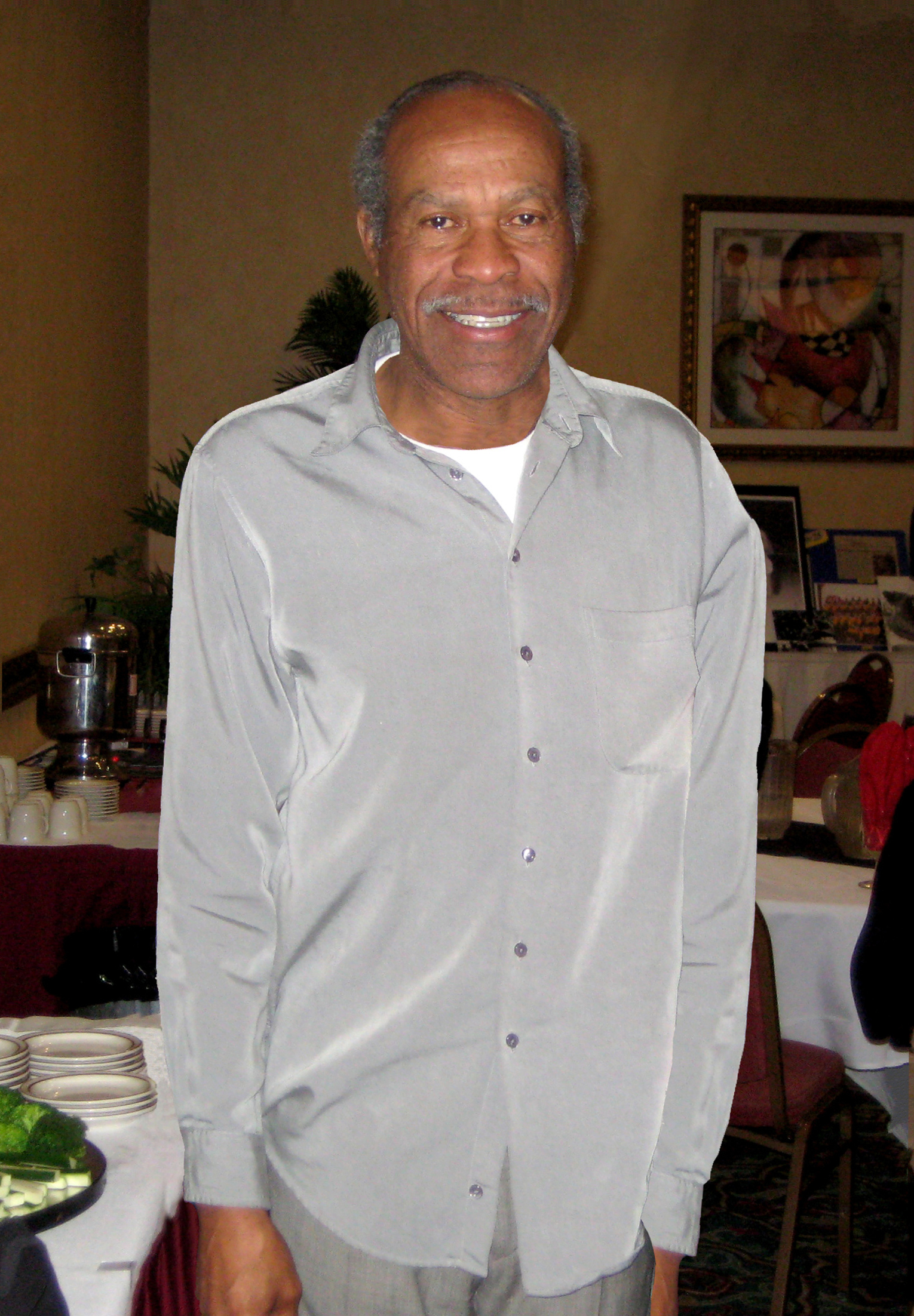
Lee Evans

- February 1 – Clark Olofsson, Swedish criminal (d. 2025)
- February 2 – Farrah Fawcett, American actress (Charlie's Angels) (d. 2009)
- February 3
  - Paul Auster, American novelist (d. 2024)
  - Dave Davies, English rock musician (The Kinks)
  - Melanie (Safka), American folk singer (d. 2024)
- February 4
  - Halina Aszkiełowicz-Wojno, Polish volleyball player (d. 2018)
  - Dennis C. Blair, American admiral, Director of National Intelligence
  - John Campbell Brown, Scottish astronomer (d. 2019)
  - Dan Quayle, 44th Vice President of the United States
- February 5 – Regina Duarte, Brazilian actress; former Special Secretary of Culture of Brazil
- February 7 – Wayne Allwine, American voice actor (Mickey Mouse) (d. 2009)
- February 10 – Louise Arbour, Canadian jurist
- February 11
  - Yukio Hatoyama, 60th Prime Minister of Japan
  - Roy Moore, American politician
- February 13 – Mike Krzyzewski, American basketball player and coach
- February 15
  - John Adams, American composer
  - Wenche Myhre, Norwegian actress, singer
  - Ádám Nádasdy, Hungarian linguist and poet (d. 2026)
- February 16 – Veríssimo Correia Seabra, Bissau-Guinean military commander (d. 2004)
- February 18
  - Princess Christina of the Netherlands (d. 2019)
  - José Luis Cuerda, Spanish filmmaker, screenwriter and producer (d. 2020)
- February 19 – Gustavo Rodríguez, Venezuelan actor (d. 2014)
- February 20
  - Peter Osgood, English footballer (d. 2006)
  - Peter Strauss, American actor
- February 21
  - Victor Sokolov, Russian dissident journalist and priest (d. 2006)
  - Renata Sorrah, Brazilian actress
- February 25
  - Lee Evans, American Olympic athlete (d. 2021)
  - Doug Yule, American rock singer (The Velvet Underground)
- February 26 – Sandie Shaw, British singer
- February 27 – Gidon Kremer, Latvian violinist
- February 28 – Stephanie Beacham, English actress

=== March ===
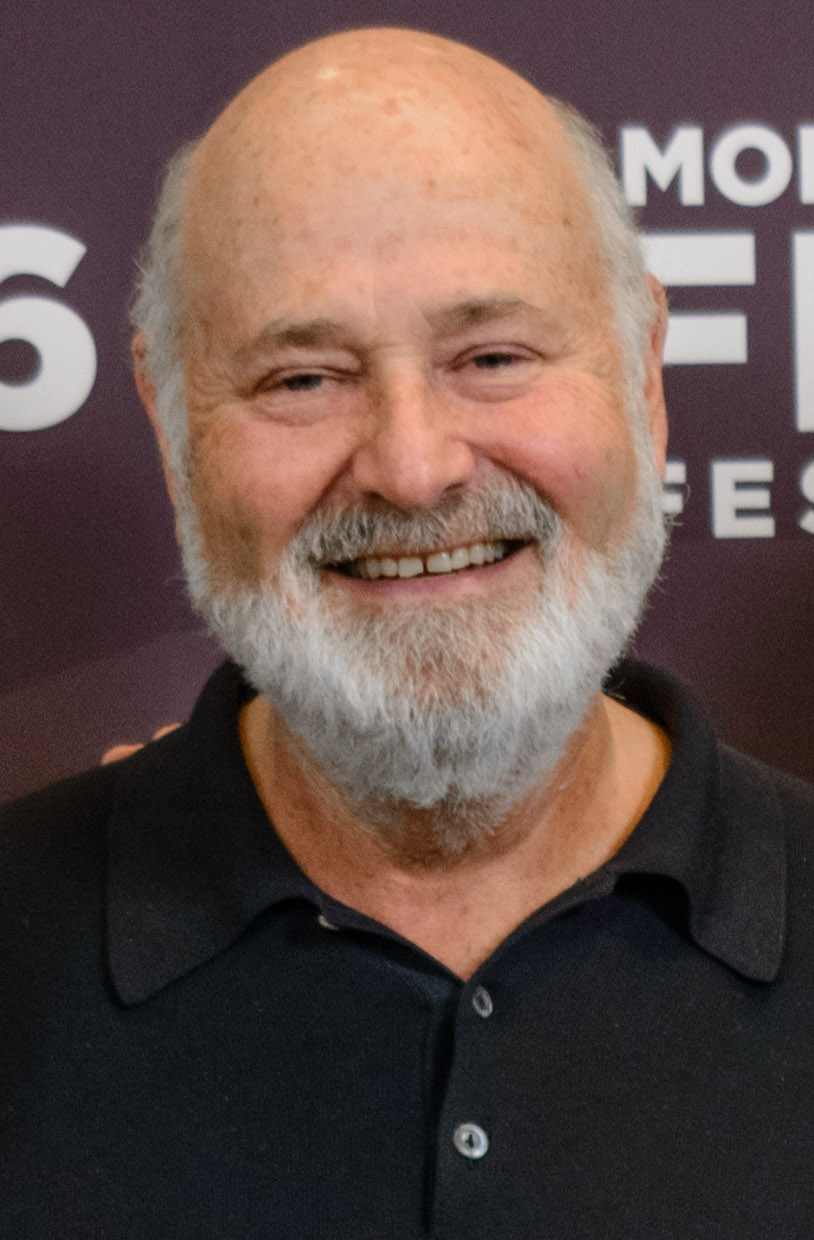
Rob Reiner

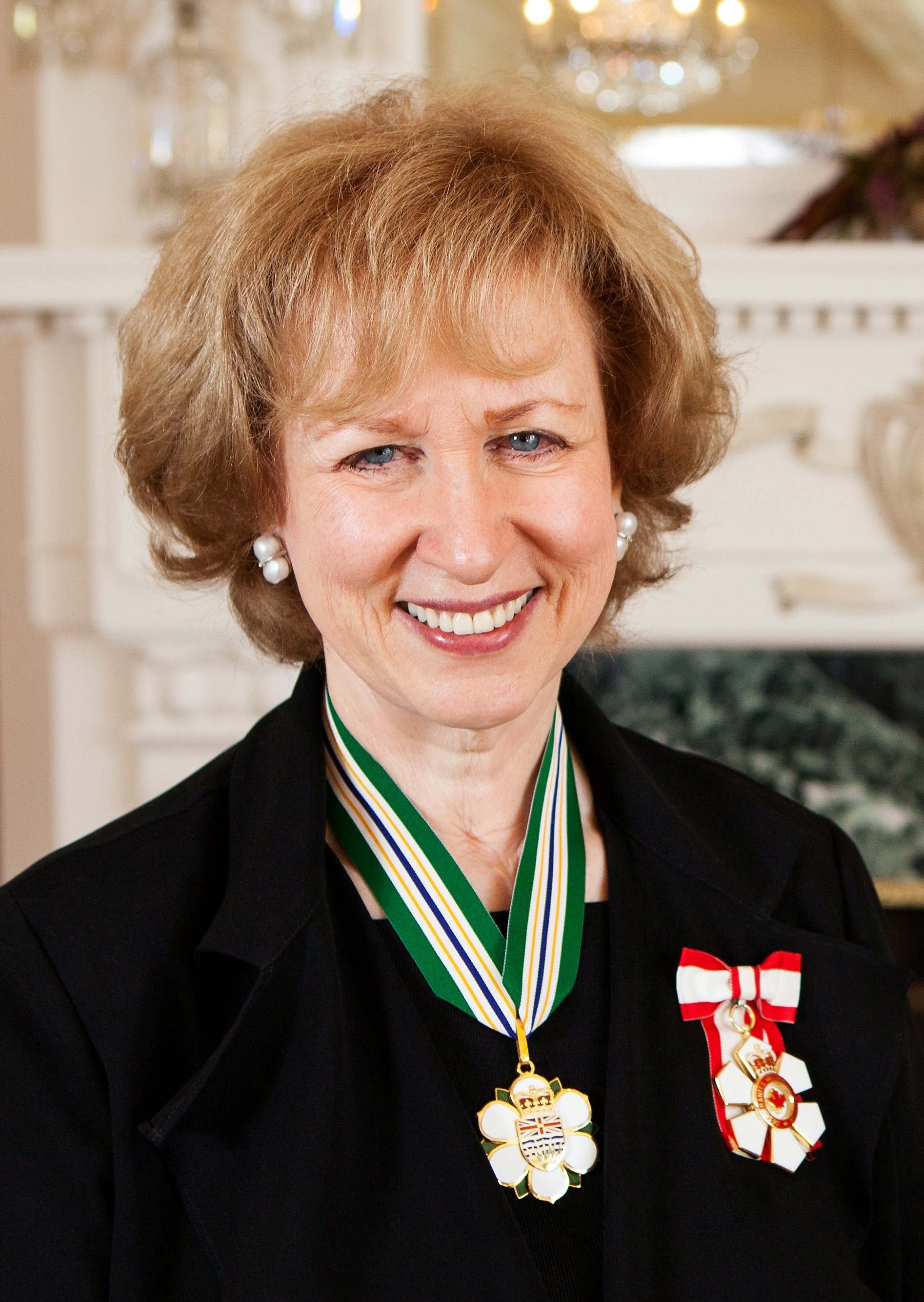
Kim Campbell

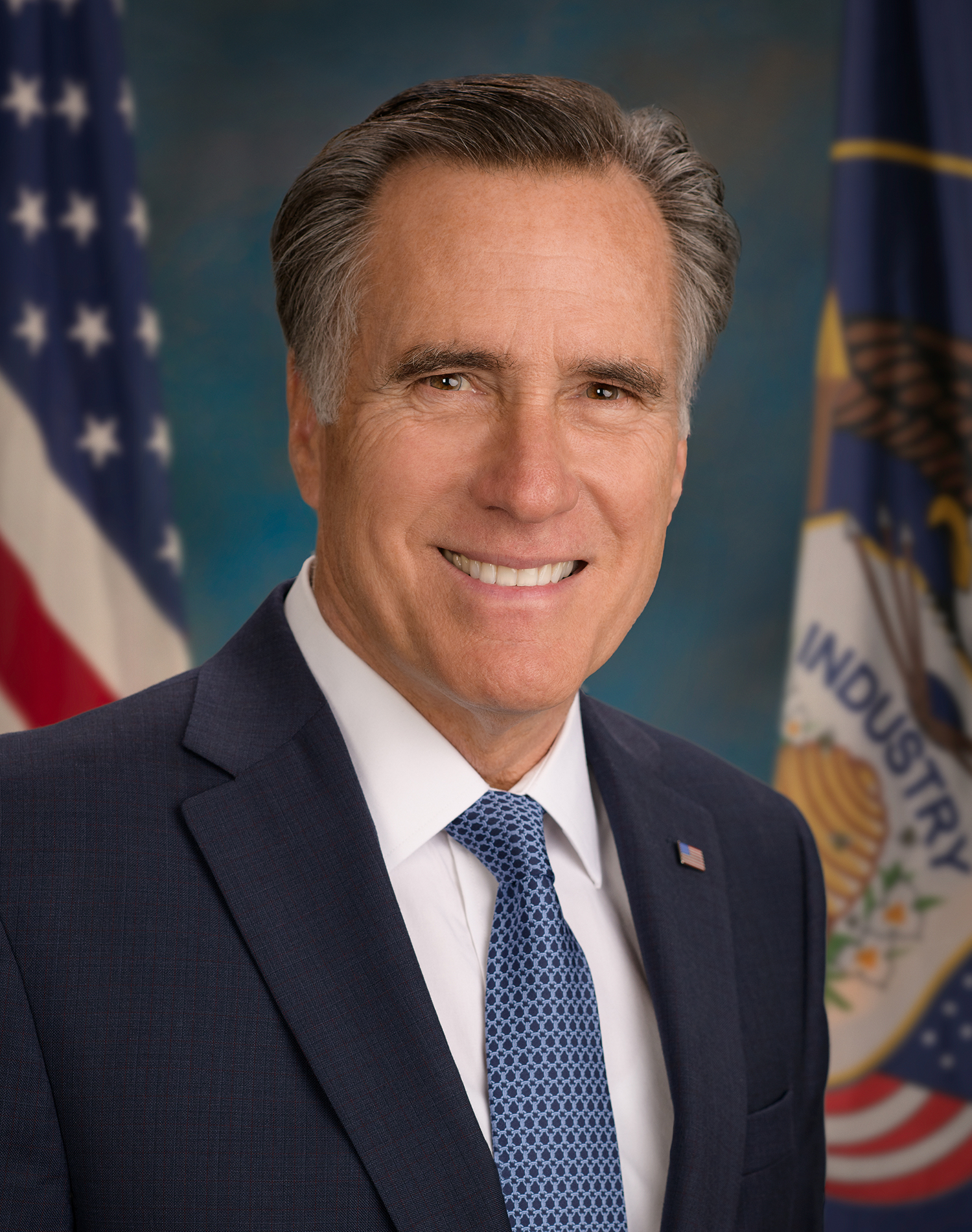
Mitt Romney

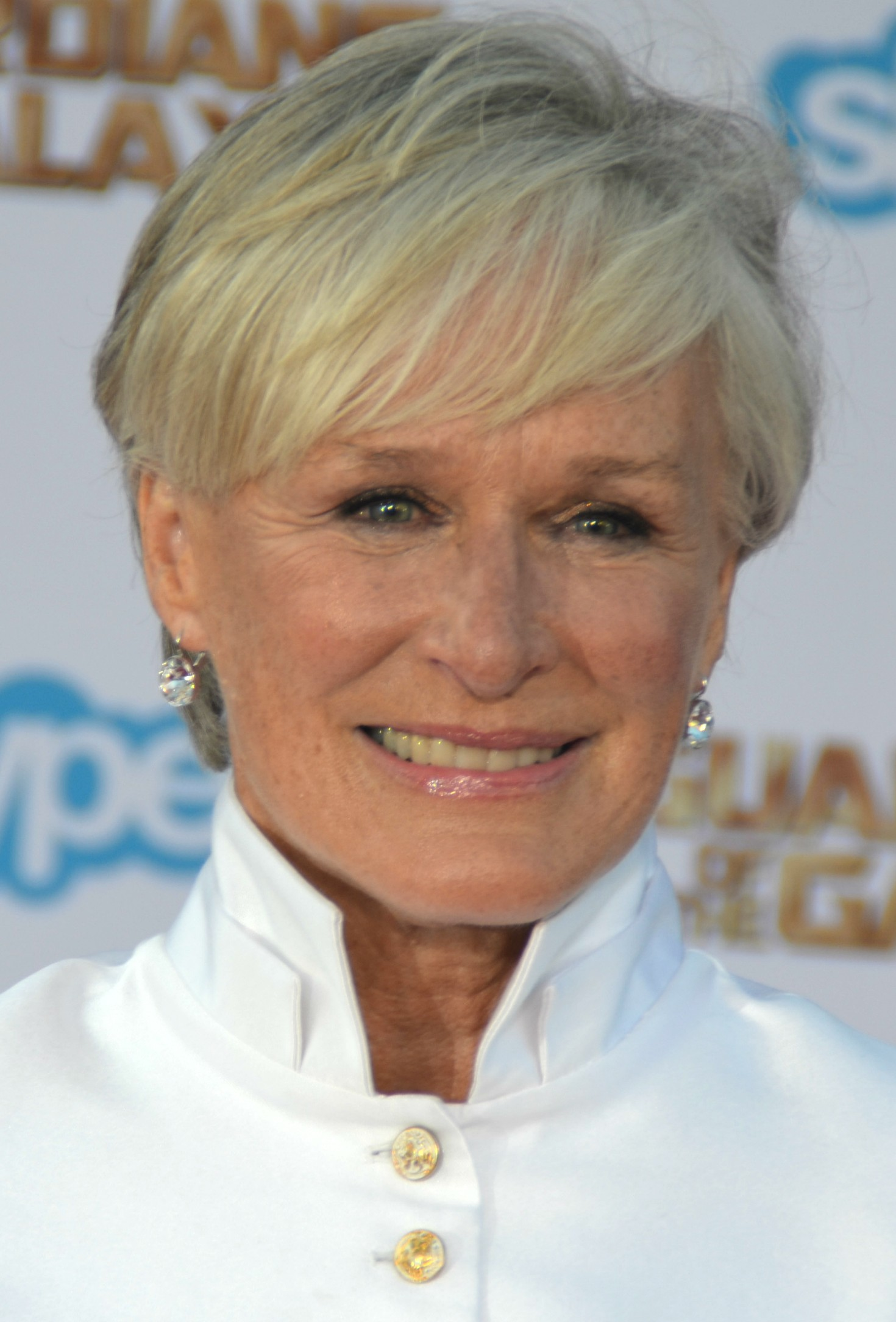
Glenn Close

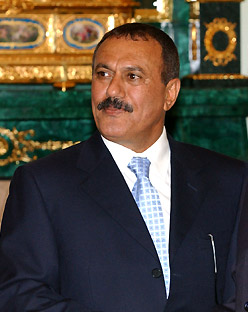
Ali Abdullah Saleh

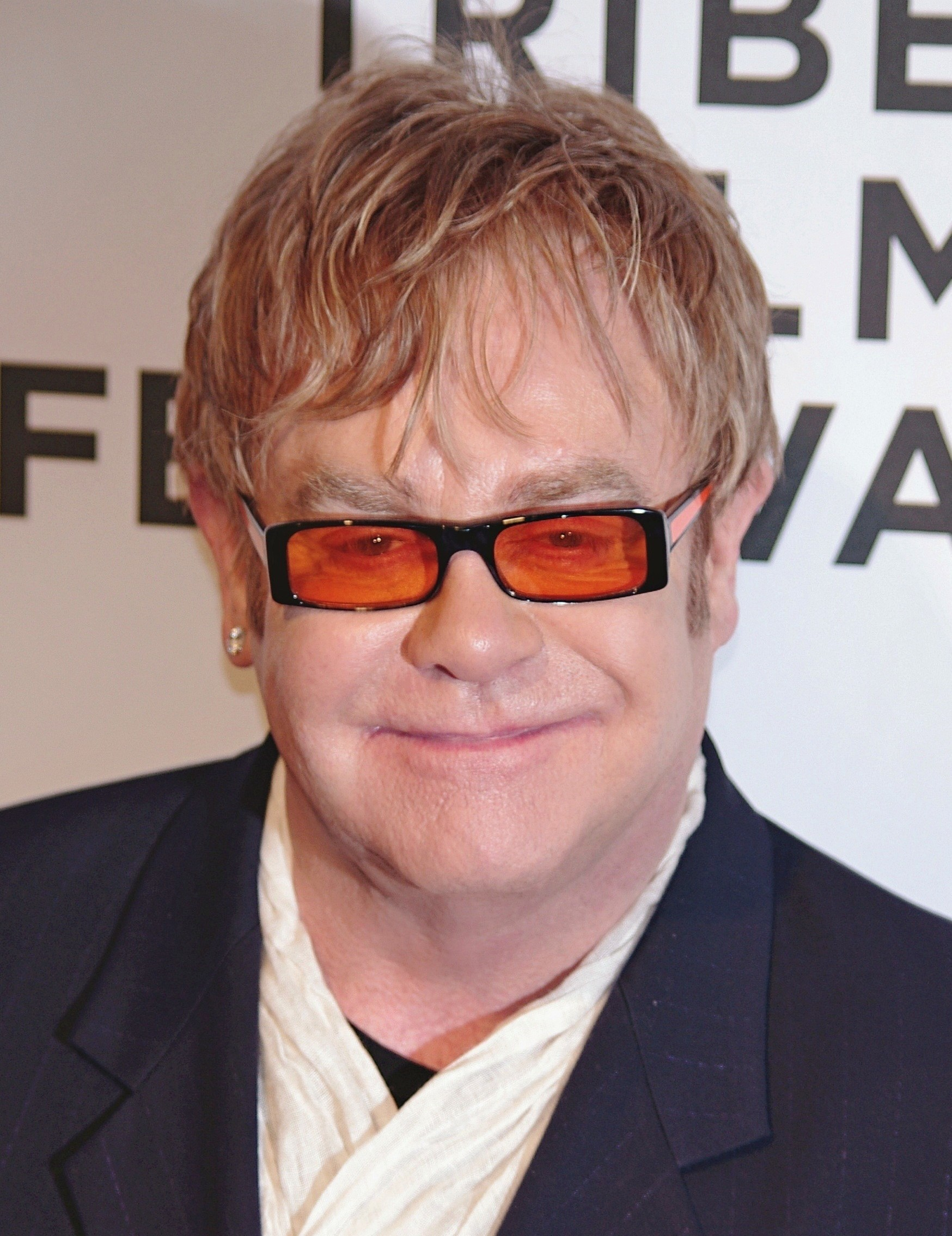
Sir Elton John

- March 1 – Alan Thicke, Canadian actor and television host (d. 2016)
- March 2 – Yuri Bogatyryov, Soviet actor (d. 1989)
- March 3
  - Óscar Washington Tabárez, Uruguayan football manager and former player
  - Mike Sheahan, Australian journalist
- March 4
  - Jan Garbarek, Norwegian musician
  - Gunnar Hansen, Icelandic actor (d. 2015)
- March 6
  - Kiki Dee, English pop singer (Don't Go Breaking My Heart)
  - Dick Fosbury, American high-jumper (d. 2023)
  - Teru Miyamoto, Japanese author
  - Rob Reiner, American actor, comedian, producer, director and activist (All in the Family) (d. 2025)
  - John Stossel, American journalist
- March 7 – Walter Röhrl, German racing driver
- March 8
  - Carole Bayer Sager, American singer, songwriter
  - Michael S. Hart, American author, inventor (d. 2011)
- March 9 – Ryszard Peryt, Polish conductor, librettist (d. 2019)
- March 10 – Kim Campbell, Prime Minister of Canada
- March 11 – Geoff Hunt, Australian squash player
- March 12
  - Kalervo Palsa, Finnish artist
  - Mitt Romney, American businessman, politician, Governor of Massachusetts, 2012 presidential candidate, and US Senator (R-UT)
- March 13 – Beat Richner, Swiss pediatrician, cellist (d. 2018)
- March 15 – Ry Cooder, American guitarist
- March 16
  - Baek Yoon-sik, South Korean actor
  - Ramzan Paskayev, Chechen accordionist
- March 17 – Yury Chernavsky, Russian-born composer, producer (d. 2025)
- March 18 – Tamara Griesser Pečar, Slovenian historian
- March 19 – Glenn Close, American actress
- March 21 – Ali Abdullah Saleh, President of Yemen (d. 2017)
- March 22 – James Patterson, American author
- March 24
  - Louise Lanctôt, Canadian terrorist and writer
  - Alan Sugar, English entrepreneur
- March 25 – Elton John, English singer-songwriter and composer
- March 26 – Subhash Kak, Indian-American author
- March 31
  - Wong Choon Wah, Malaysian footballer (d. 2014)
  - César Gaviria, Colombian economist, politician and 28th President of Colombia

=== April ===
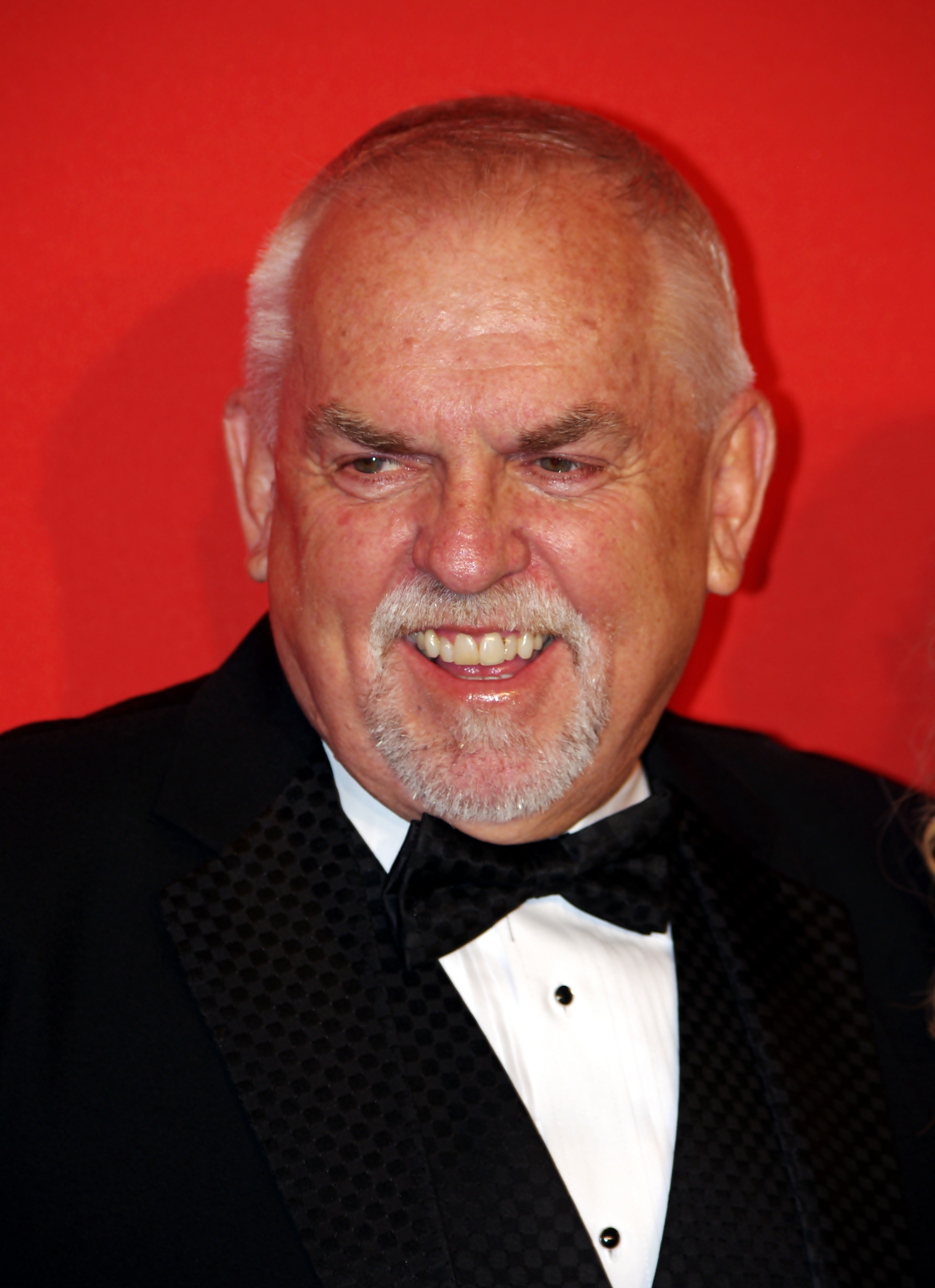
John Ratzenberger

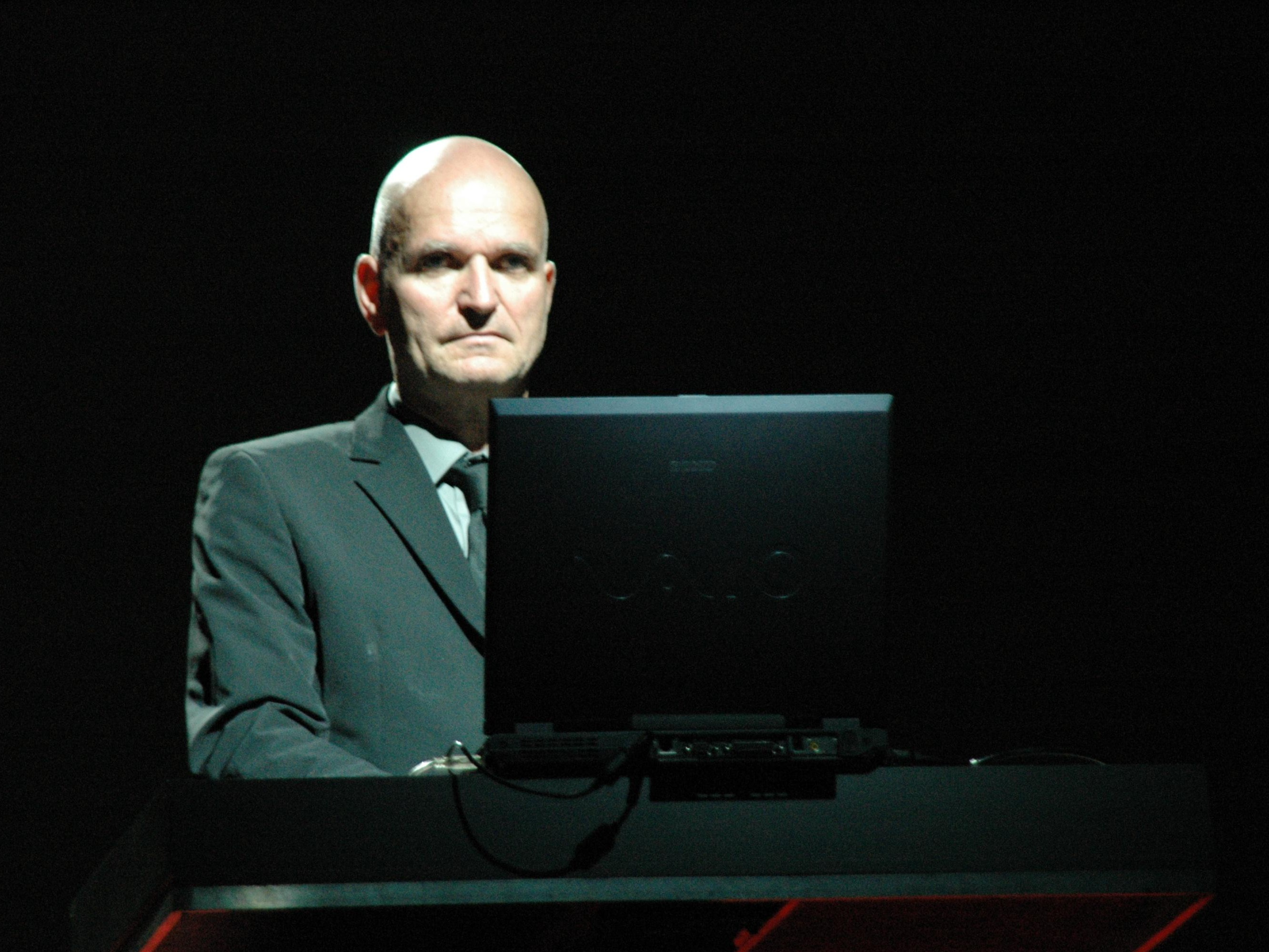
Florian Schneider

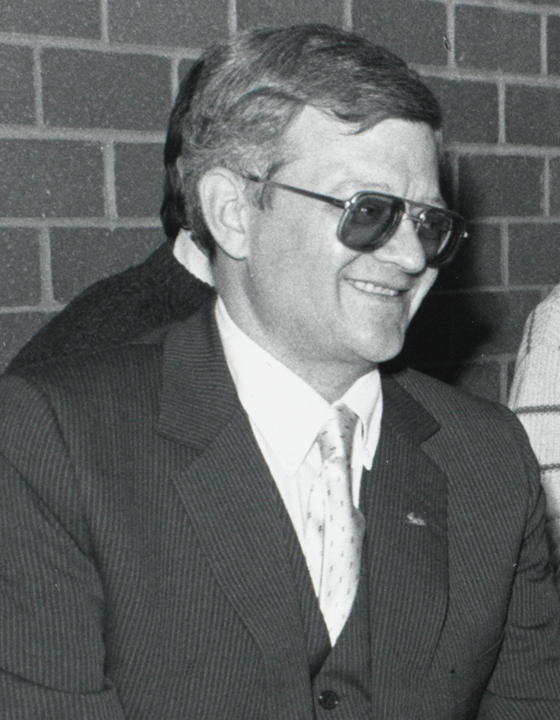
Tom Clancy

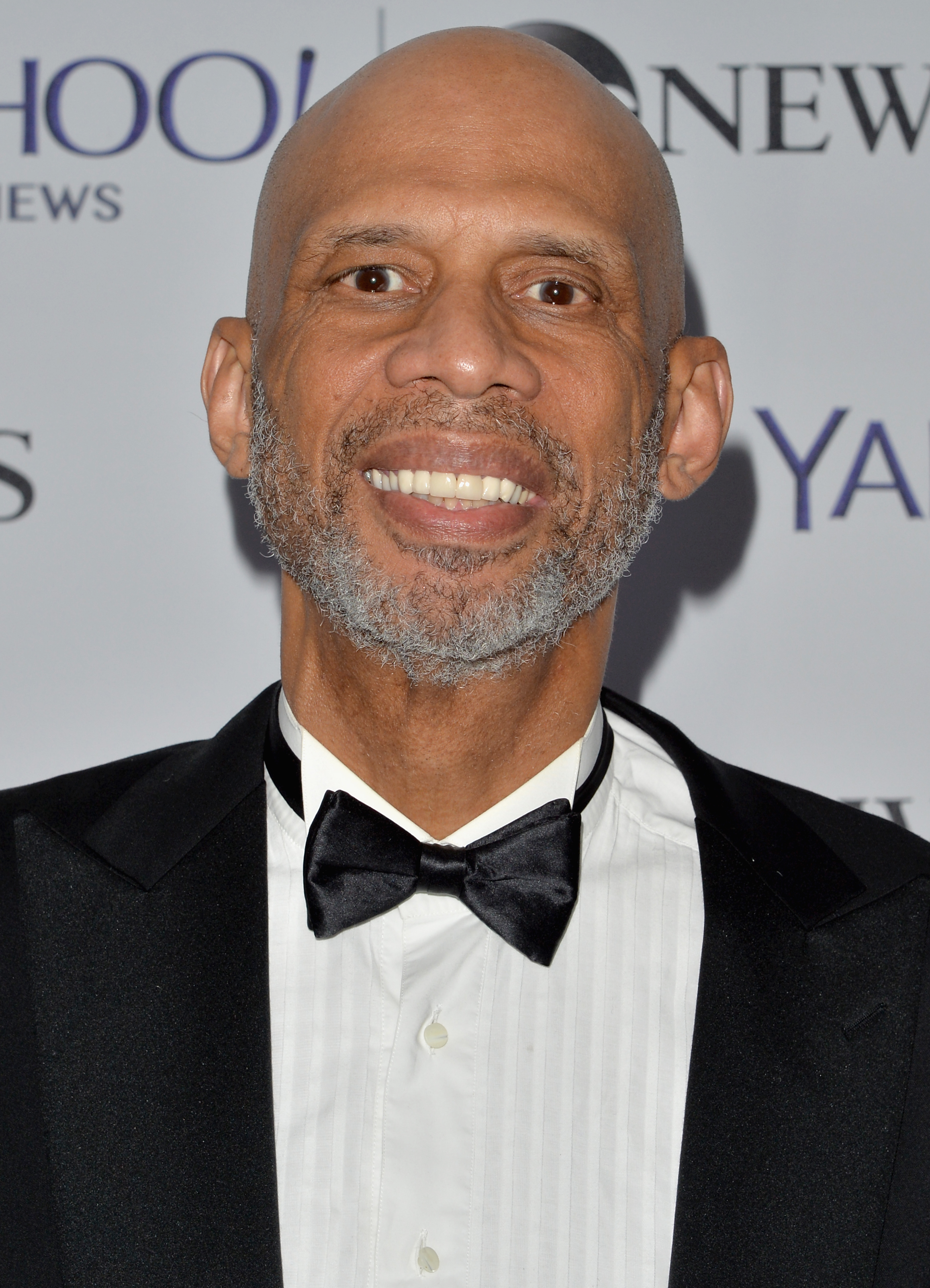
Kareem Abdul-Jabbar

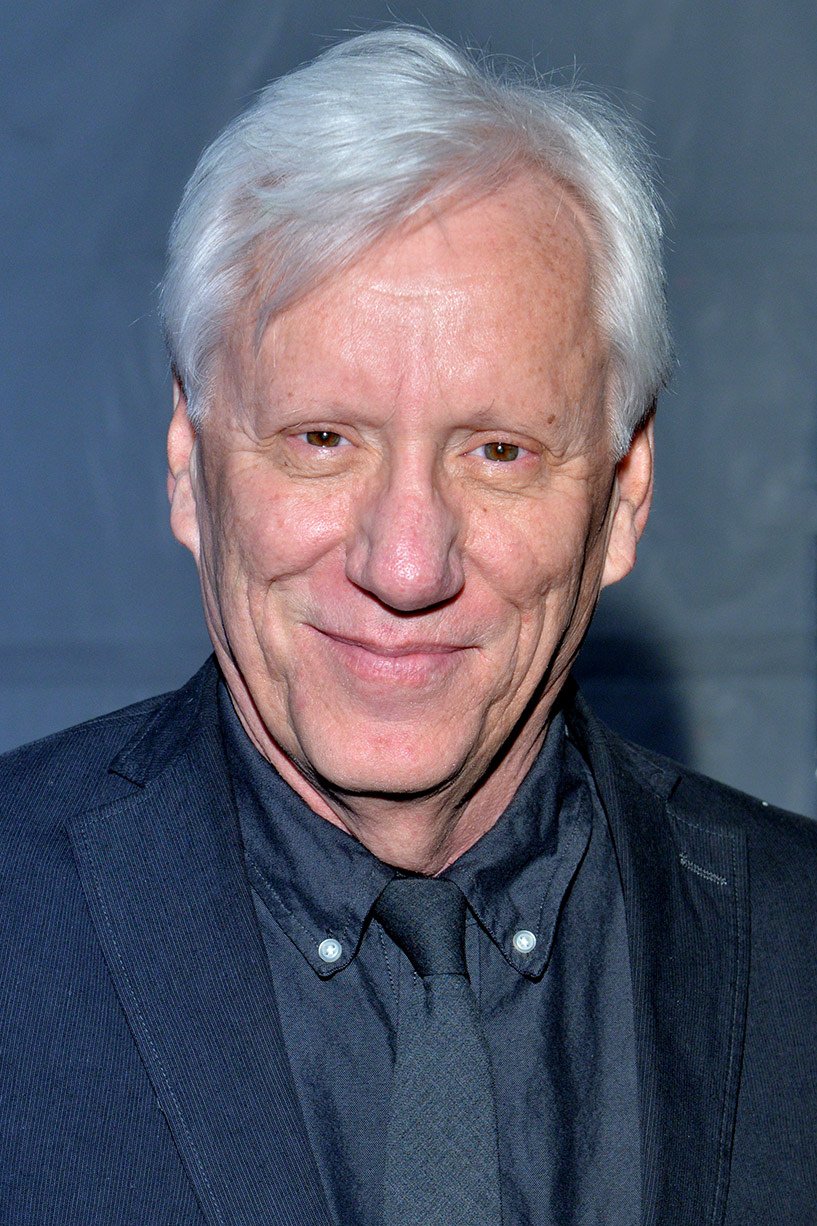
James Woods

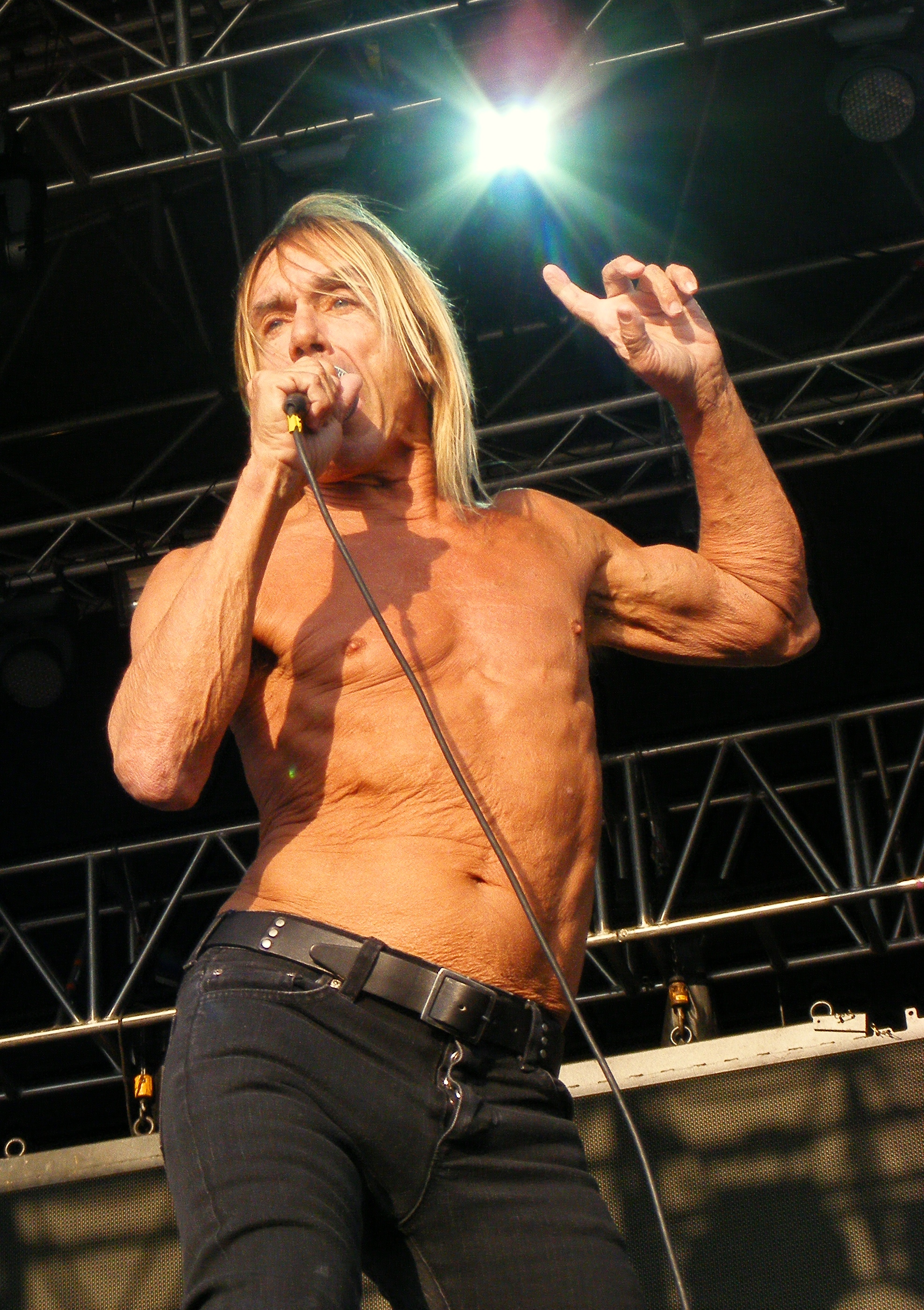
Iggy Pop

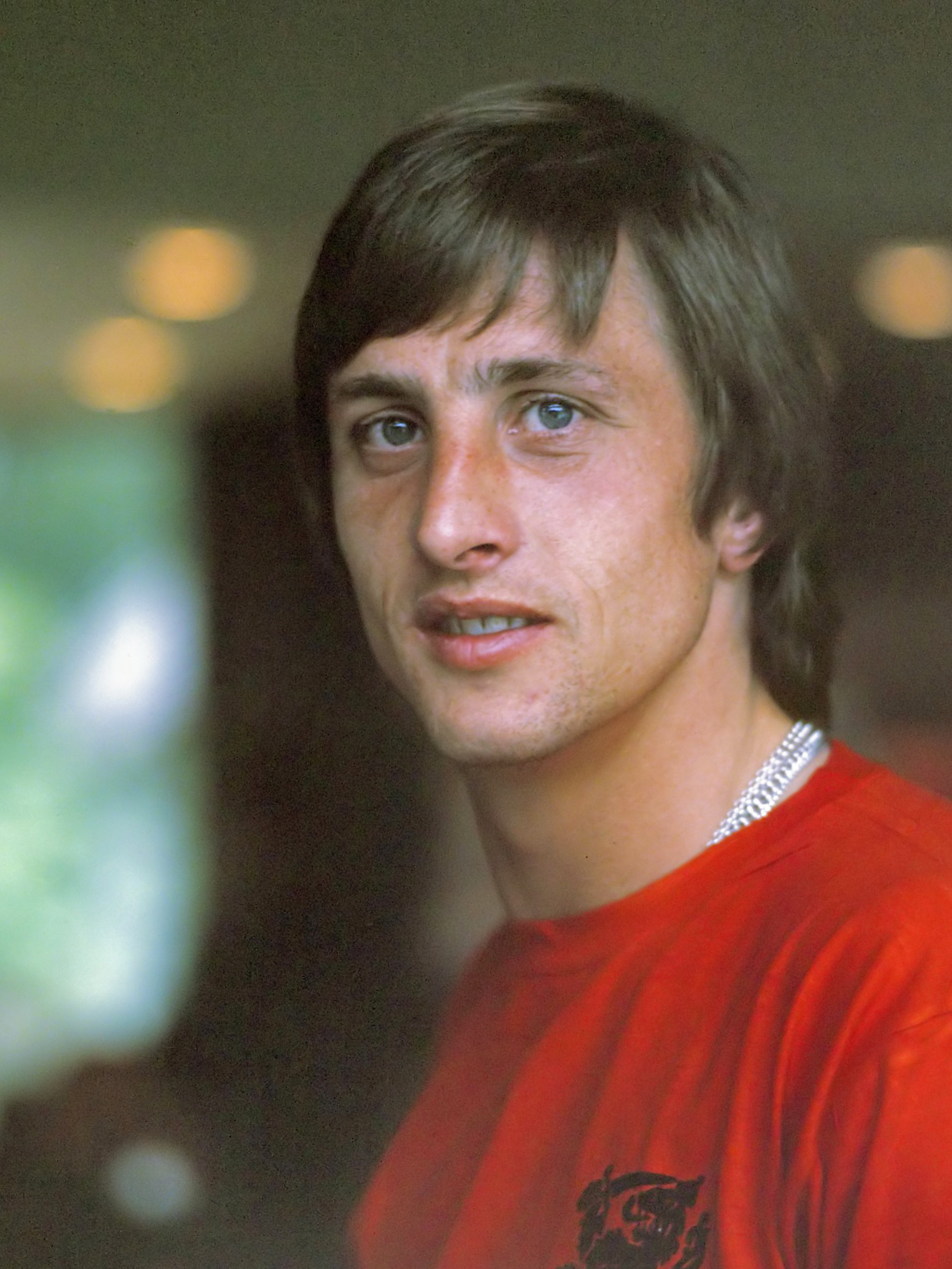
Johan Cruyff

- April 1
  - Alain Connes, French mathematician
  - Ingrid Steeger, German actress, comedian (d. 2023)
  - Tzipi Shavit, Israeli actress
- April 2
  - Paquita la del Barrio, Mexican singer, actress (d. 2025)
  - Emmylou Harris, American singer, songwriter
  - Camille Paglia, American literary critic
- April 5 – Gloria Macapagal Arroyo, 14th President of the Philippines, daughter of president Diosdado Macapagal
- April 6 – John Ratzenberger, American actor (Cheers)
- April 7 – Florian Schneider, German musician (d. 2020)
- April 10 – Bunny Wailer, Jamaican reggae musician (d. 2021)
- April 12
  - Tom Clancy, American author (d. 2013)
  - David Letterman, American talk show host
- April 13 – Mike Chapman, Australian-born songwriter, record producer
- April 15 – Lois Chiles, American actress
- April 16
  - Kareem Abdul-Jabbar, African-American basketball player, actor (Airplane!)
  - Gerry Rafferty, Scottish singer-songwriter ("Baker Street") (d. 2011)
- April 18
  - Kathy Acker, American author (d. 1997)
  - Jerzy Stuhr, Polish actor, director
  - James Woods, American actor
- April 19 – Murray Perahia, American pianist
- April 20
  - Daud Ibrahim, Malaysian cyclist (d. 2010)
  - Hector, Finnish rock musician
- April 21 – Iggy Pop, American rock musician
- April 24 – Josep Borrell, Spanish minister, MEP and EU High Representative
- April 25
  - Johan Cruyff, Dutch footballer and coach (d. 2016)
  - Jeffrey DeMunn, American actor
- April 27 – Pete Ham, Welsh rock singer-songwriter and guitarist (suicide 1975)
- April 29
  - Olavo de Carvalho, Brazilian journalist, essayist and professor of philosophy
  - Tommy James, American rock singer, producer
- April 30 – Malini Fonseka, Sri Lankan actress, filmmaker and politician (d. 2025)

=== May ===
- May 1 – Jacob Bekenstein, Mexico-born Israeli-American theoretical physicist (d. 2015)
- May 4 – Theda Skocpol, American sociologist
- May 5 – Malam Bacai Sanhá, Guinea-Bissau politician (d. 2012)
- May 6 – Martha Nussbaum, American philosopher
- May 8 – H. Robert Horvitz, American biologist, recipient of the Nobel Prize in Physiology or Medicine
- May 9 – Yukiya Amano, Japanese international civil servant (d. 2019)
- May 10 – Caroline B. Cooney, American author
- May 11
  - Walter Selke, German physicist
  - Butch Trucks, American drummer (The Allman Brothers Band) (d. 2017)
- May 12 – Michael Ignatieff, Canadian politician, philosopher and historian
- May 13 – Stephen R. Donaldson, American novelist
- May 14
  - José Gonzalo Rodríguez Gacha, Colombian drug lord (d. 1989)
  - Tamara Dobson, African-American actress, fashion model (d. 2006)
  - Ana Martín, Mexican actress, singer, producer and former model (Miss Mexico 1963)
- May 15 – Muhyiddin Yassin, Prime Minister of Malaysia
- May 18 – John Bruton, 10th Taoiseach of Ireland (d. 2024)
- May 19 – Paul Brady, Northern Irish singer, songwriter
- May 21 – Lolit Solis, Filipina talent manager (host of Startalk, CelebriTV)
- May 24 – Maude Barlow, Canadian author, activist and National Chairperson of The Council of Canadians
- May 26 – Glenn Turner, New Zealand cricket captain
- May 27
  - Peter DeFazio, American politician
  - Branko Oblak, Slovenian football player and coach
- May 28
  - Pedro Giachino, Argentine Navy officer (d. 1982)
  - Zahi Hawass, Egyptian archaeologist

=== June ===
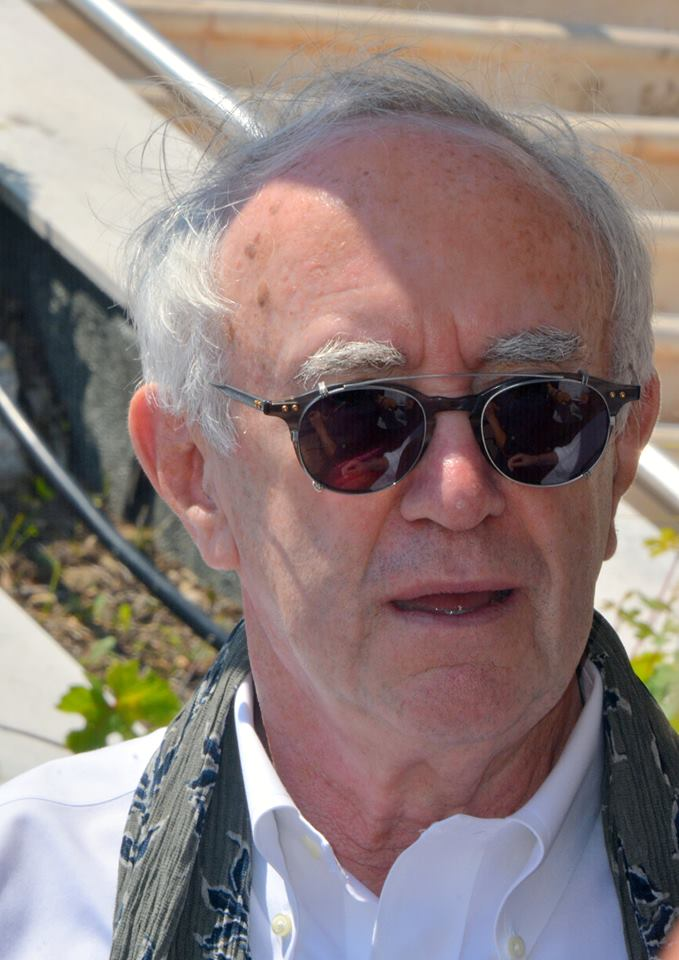
Sir Jonathan Pryce

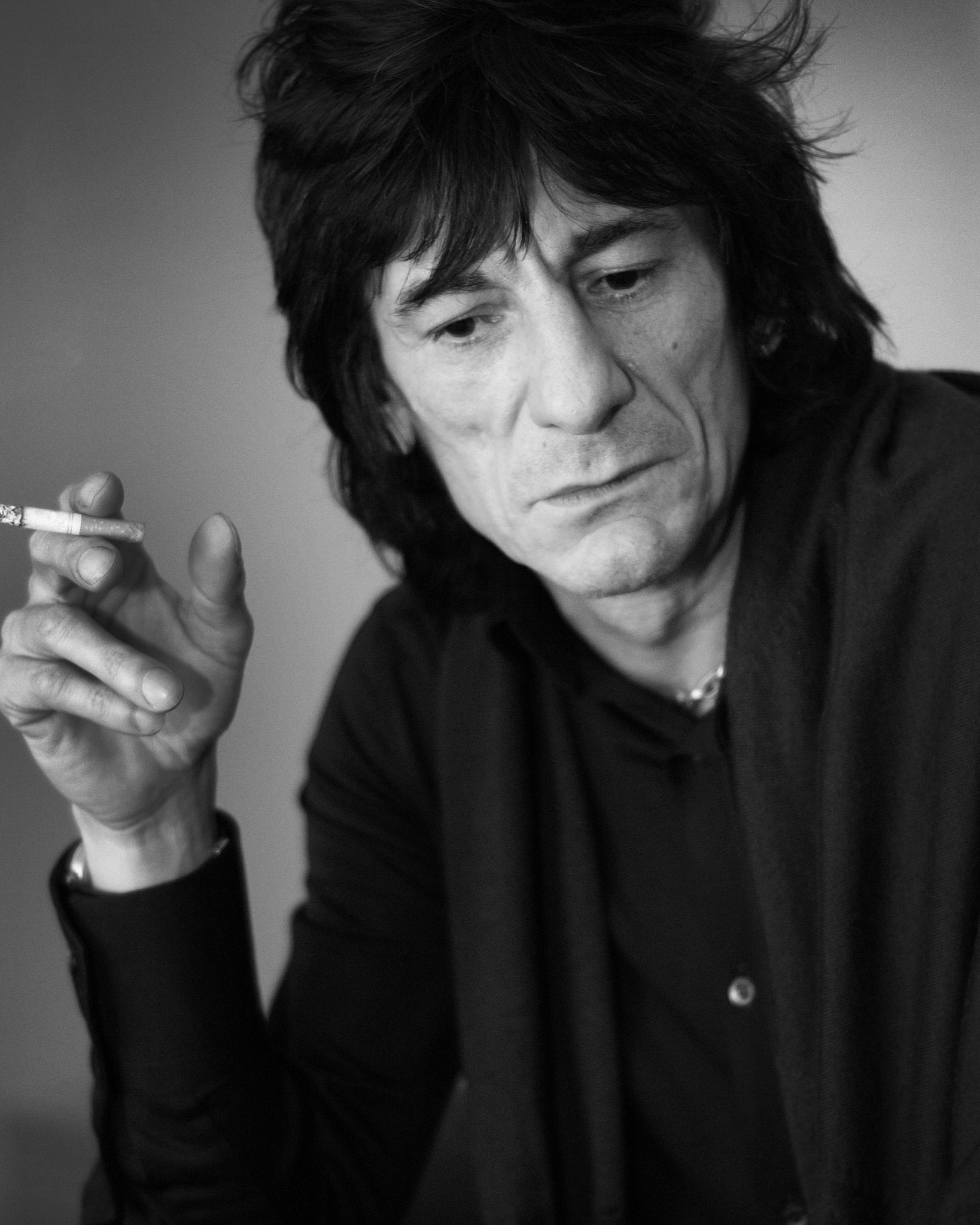
Ronnie Wood

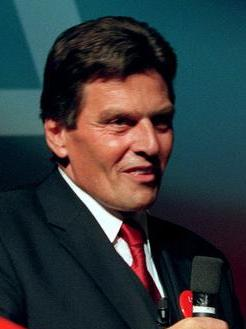
Viktor Klima

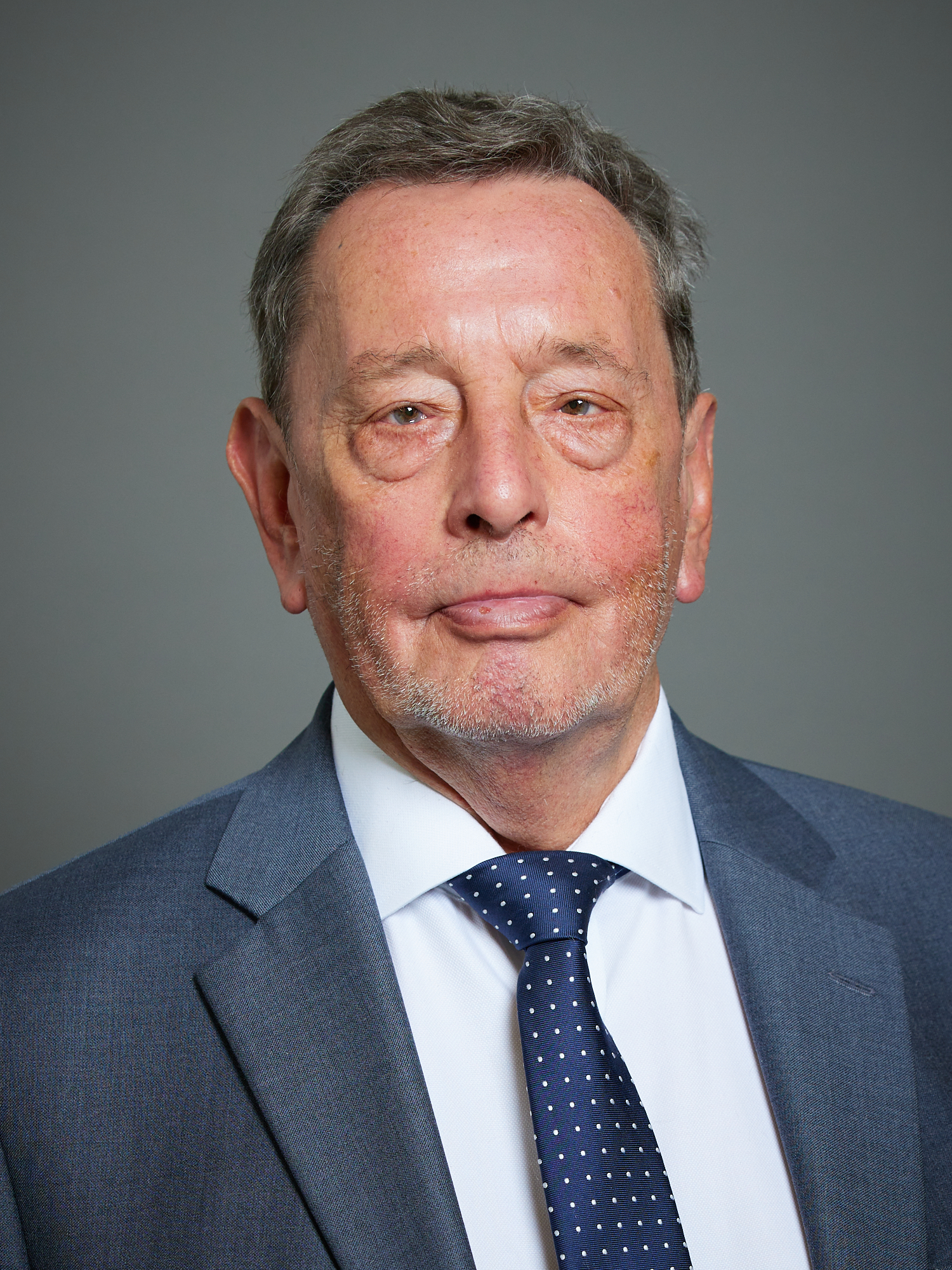
David Blunkett

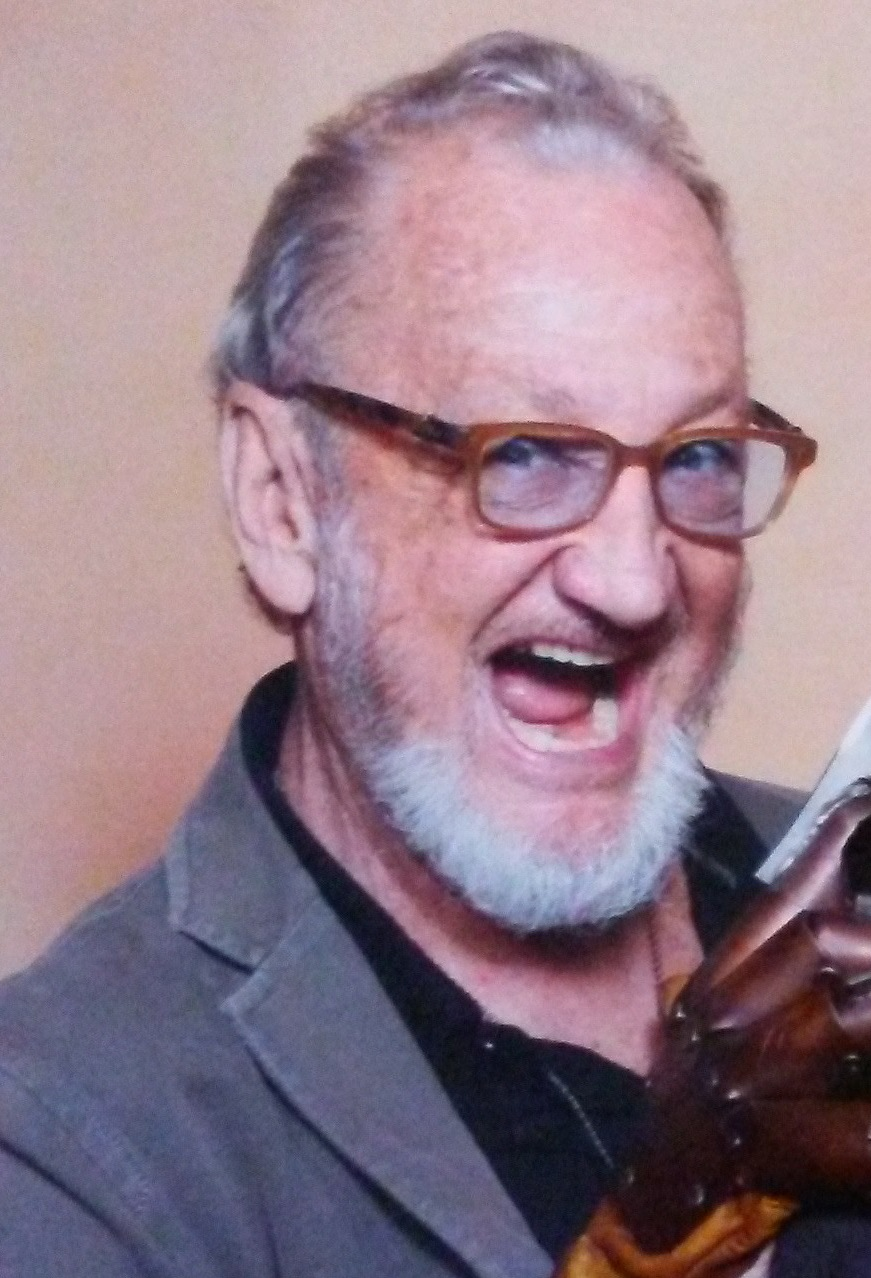
Robert Englund

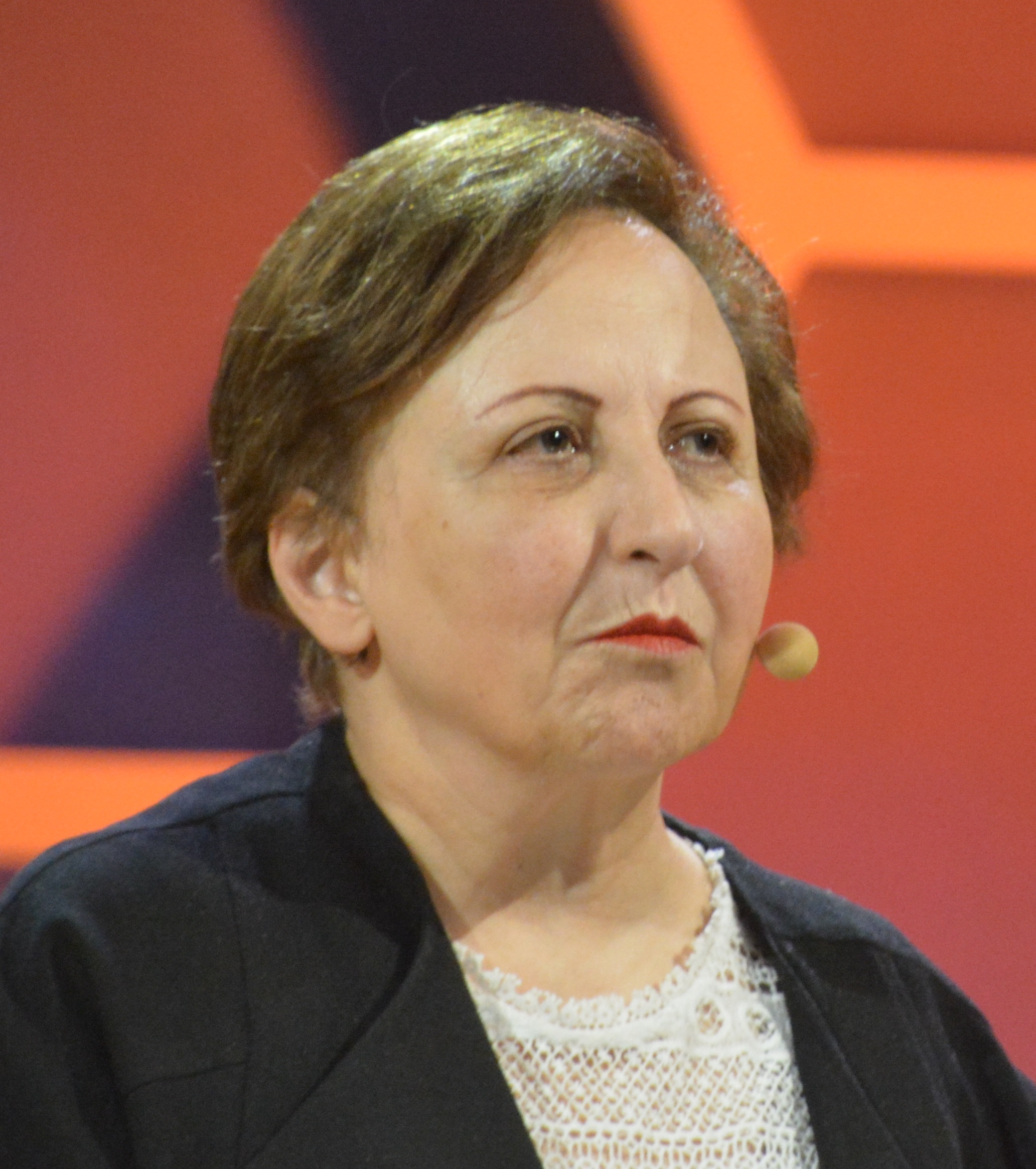
Shirin Ebadi

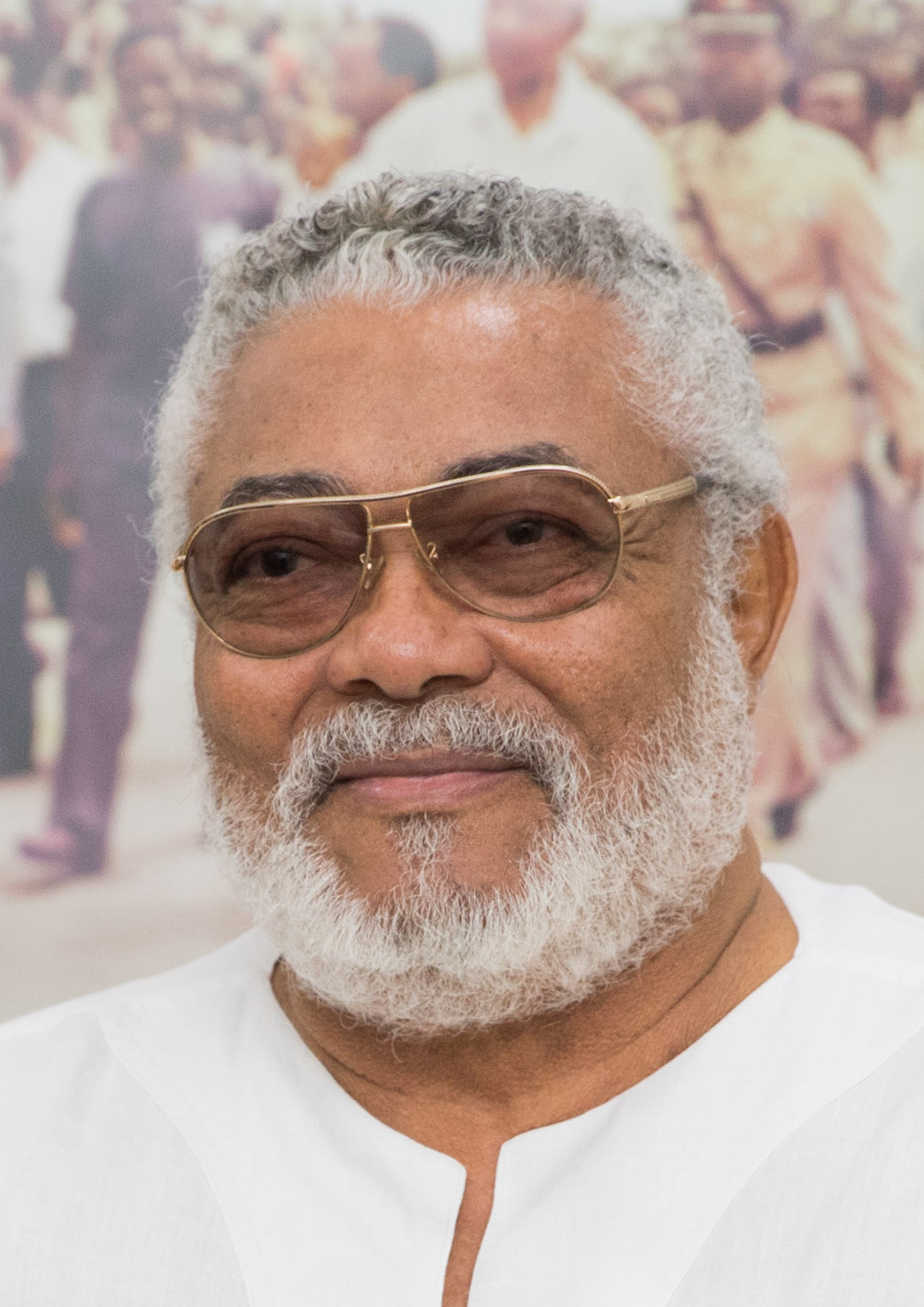
Jerry Rawlings

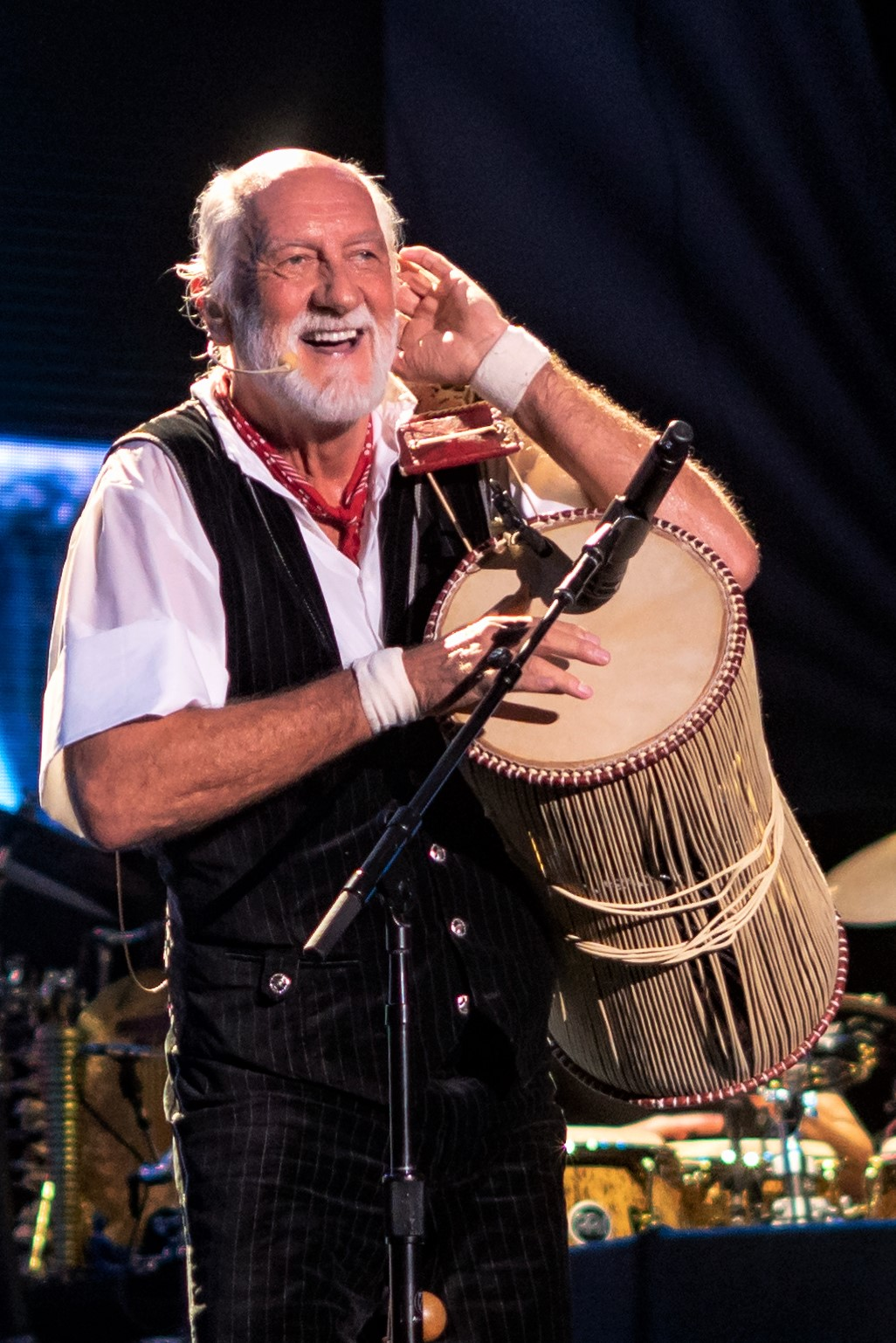
Mick Fleetwood

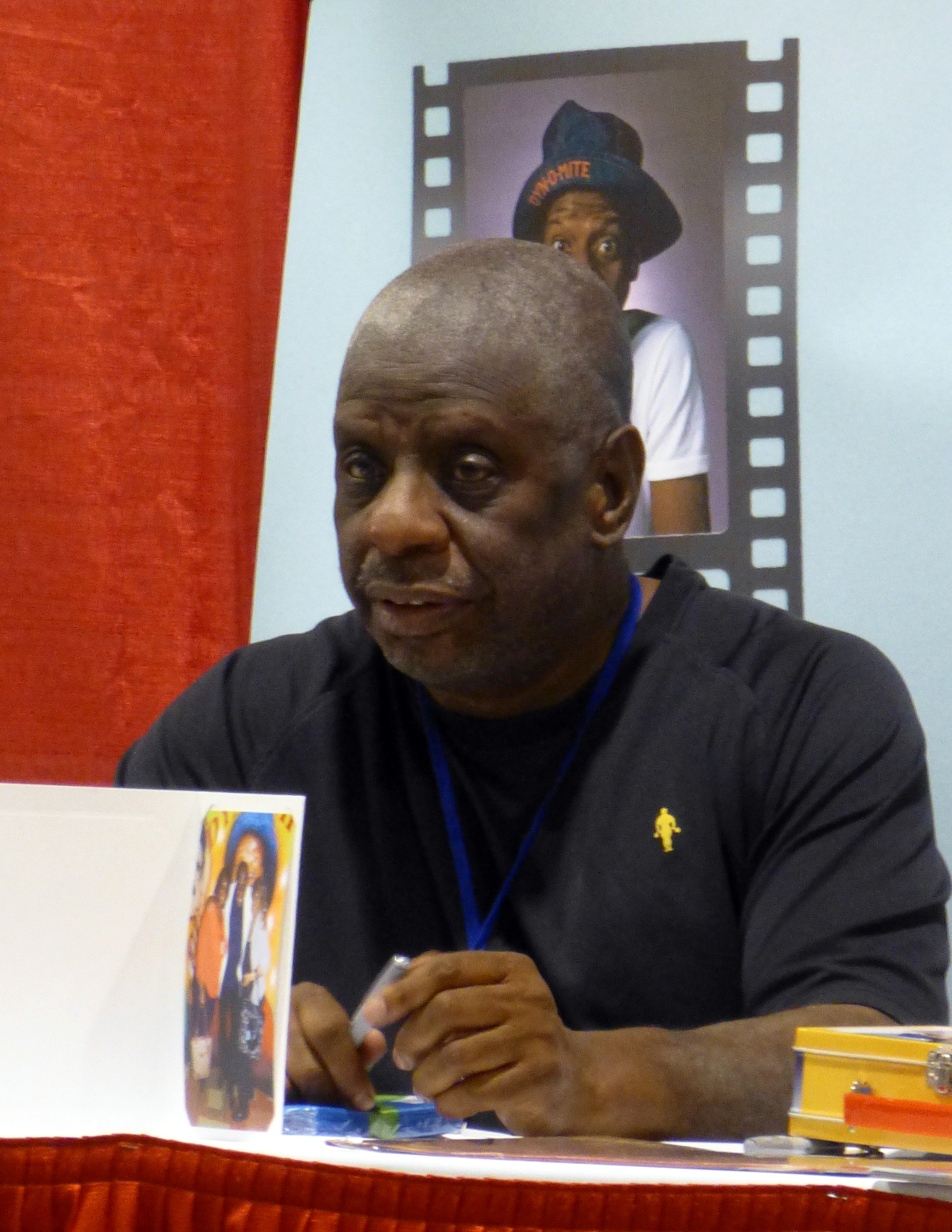
Jimmie Walker

- June 1
  - Jonathan Pryce, Welsh actor
  - Ronnie Wood, English rock musician (The Faces, The Rolling Stones)
- June 2 – Jarnail Singh Bhindranwale, Punjabi saint, Sikh theologian, military leader (d. 1984)
- June 3 – Dave Alexander, American musician (d. 1975)
- June 4 – Viktor Klima, Chancellor of Austria
- June 5
  - Laurie Anderson, American experimental performance artist, composer and musician
  - Jojon, Indonesian comedian, actor (d. 2014)
- June 6
  - David Blunkett, British politician
  - Robert Englund, American actor (V, A Nightmare on Elm Street)
  - Tapani Hyvönen, Finnish designer and business founder
  - Ada Kok, Dutch swimmer
- June 8 – Eric F. Wieschaus, American biologist, recipient of the Nobel Prize in Physiology or Medicine
- June 9
  - Françoise Demulder, French war photographer (d. 2008)
  - Robert Indermaur, Swiss painter and sculptor
- June 10 – Ken Singleton, American baseball player
- June 15
  - Alain Aspect, French quantum physicist, recipient of the Nobel Prize in Physics
  - John Hoagland, American war photographer (d. 1984)
- June 19
  - Paula Koivuniemi, Finnish singer
  - Salman Rushdie, Indian-born British author (The Satanic Verses)
- June 20 – Candy Clark, American actress
- June 21
  - Rachel Adato, Israeli gynecologist, lawyer and politician
  - Shirin Ebadi, Iranian activist, Nobel Peace Prize recipient
  - Fernando Savater, Spanish philosopher, author
- June 22
  - Bruno Latour, French philosopher, anthropologist and sociologist (d. 2022)
  - Natalya Varley, Soviet, Russian film, theater actress
  - Murray Webb, New Zealand caricature artist, test cricketer
  - David Jones, Northern Irish European Tour golfer
  - Octavia E. Butler, American author (d. 2006)
  - Trevor Blades, English cricketer
  - Pete Maravich, American basketball player (d. 1988)
  - Jerry John Rawlings, 2-time President of Ghana (d. 2020)
- June 23
  - Bryan Brown, Australian actor
  - Thor Hansen, Norwegian-born professional poker player (d. 2018)
- June 24
  - Mick Fleetwood, British musician (Fleetwood Mac)
  - Helena Vondráčková, Czech singer
  - Peter Weller, American actor and director
- June 25 – Jimmie Walker, African-American actor (Good Times)
- June 26 – Gulbuddin Hekmatyar, Afghan politician
- June 27
  - Hans Ooft, Dutch football player, manager
  - Abdel Djaadaoui, Algerian footballer
- June 29 – David Chiang, Hong Kong actor
- June 30 – Jean-Yves Le Drian, French minister

=== July ===
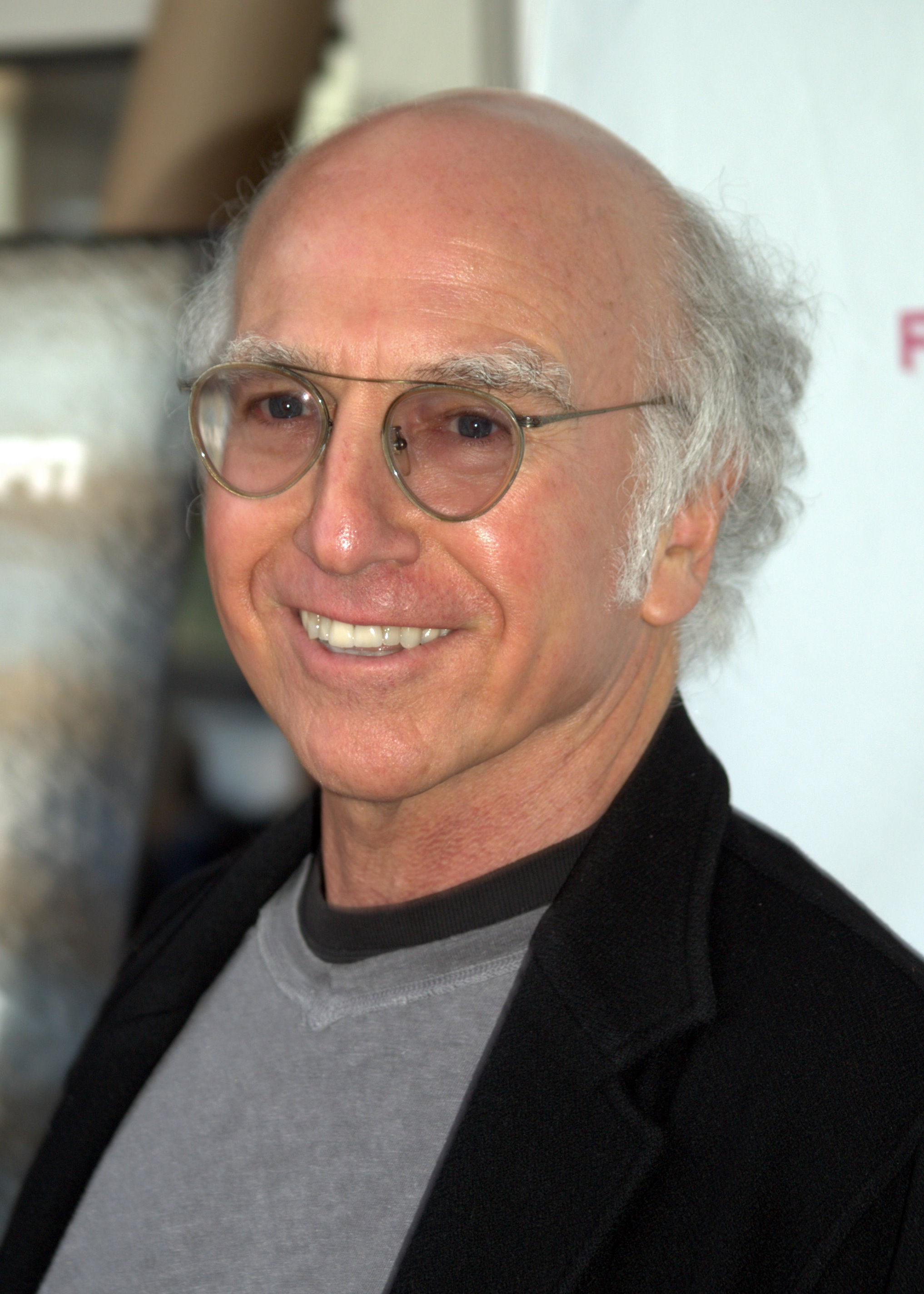
Larry David

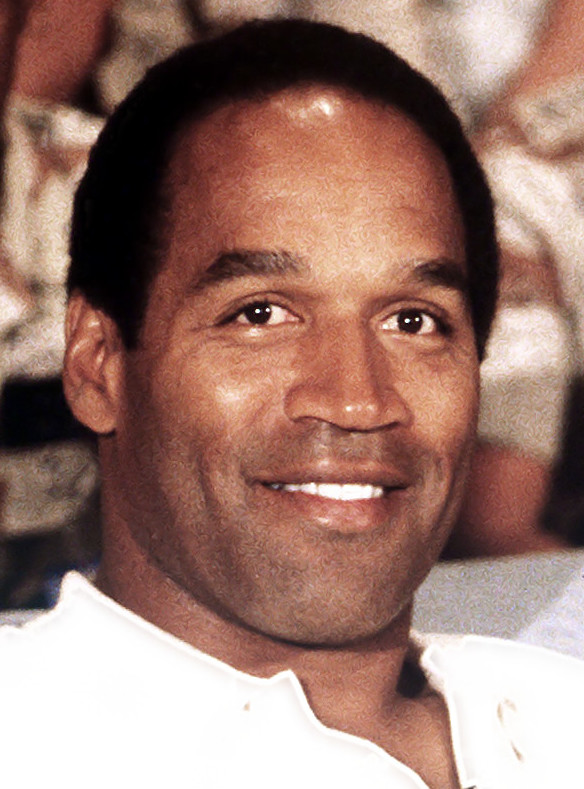
O. J. Simpson

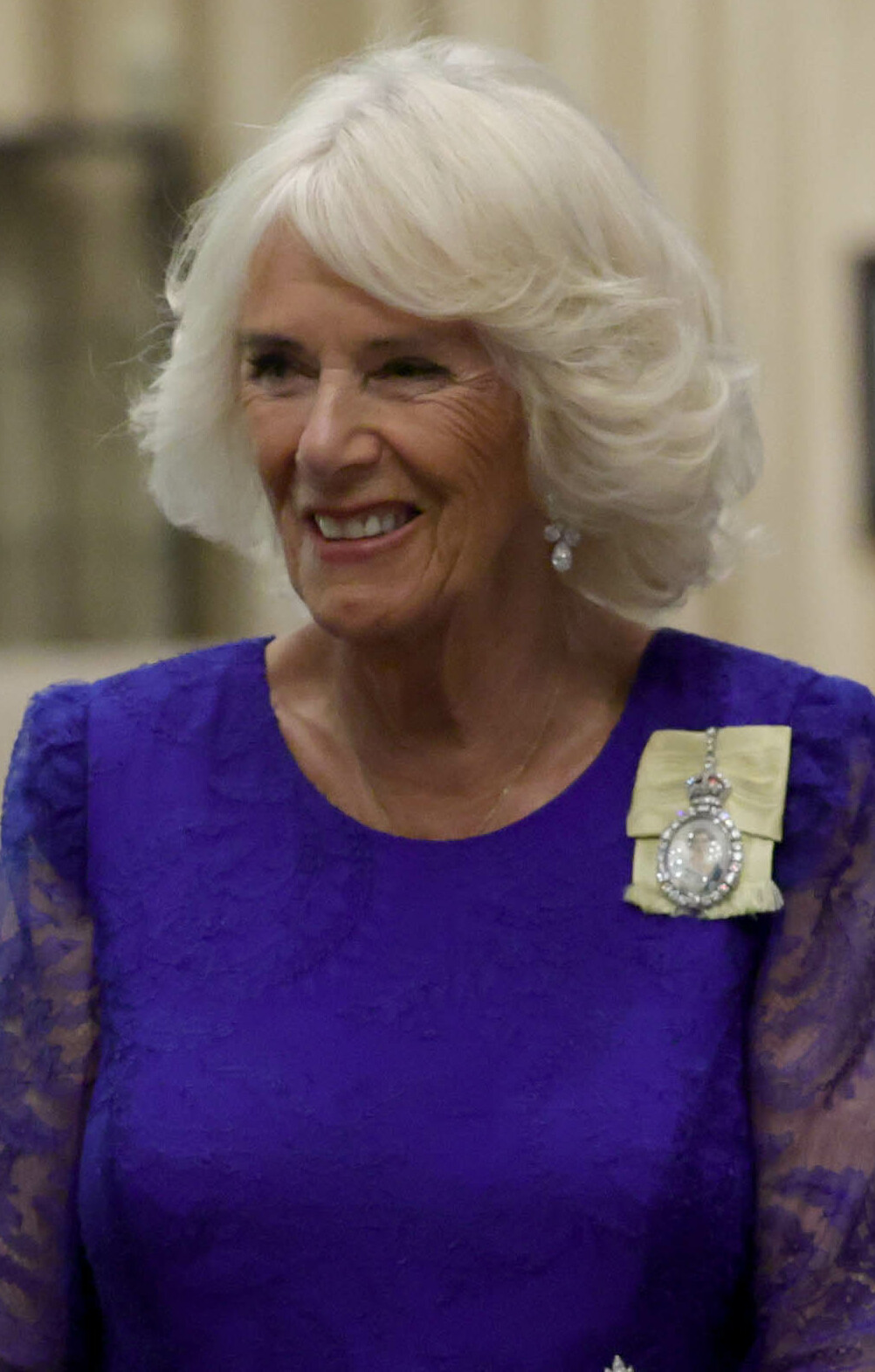
Queen Camilla

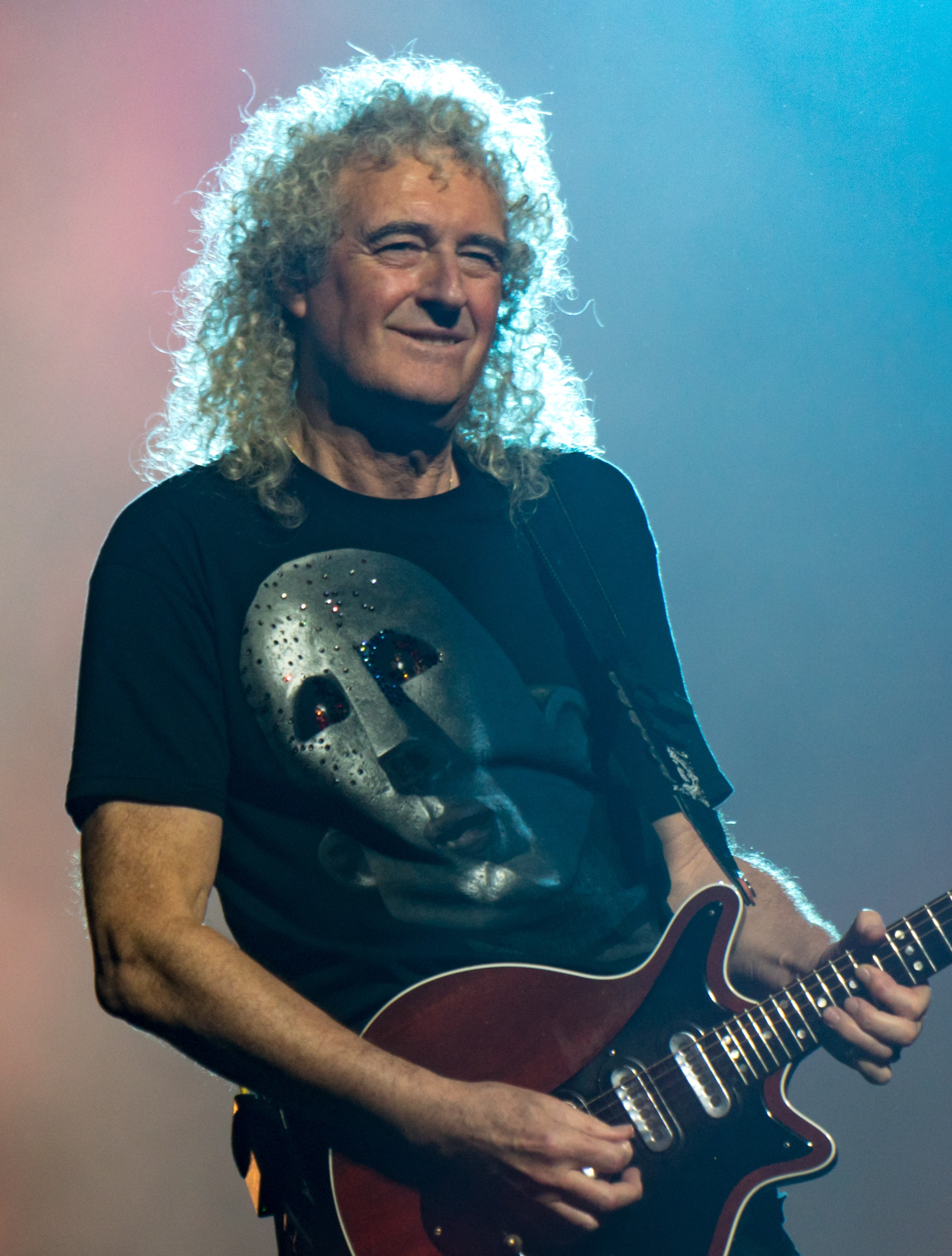
Brian May

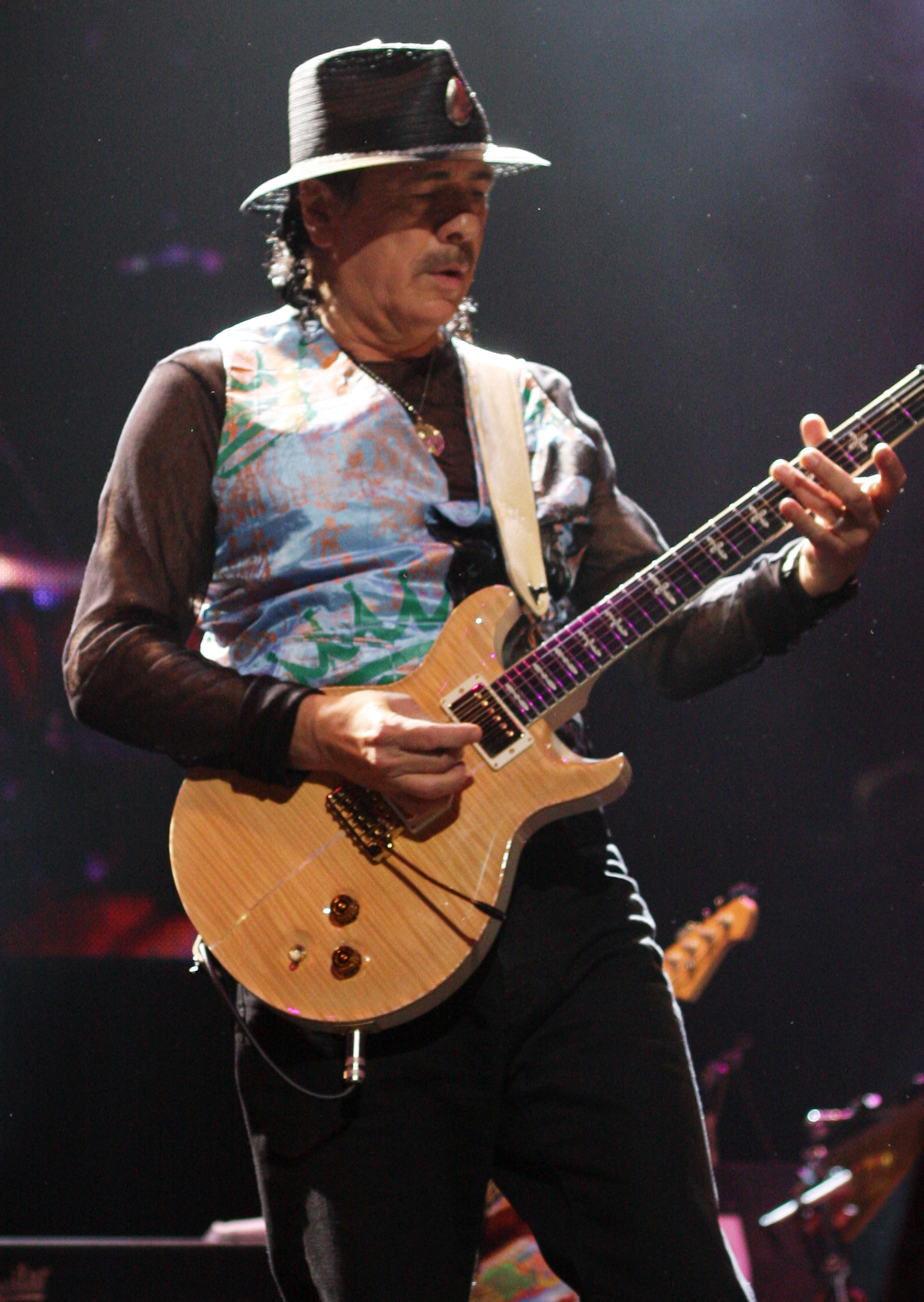
Carlos Santana

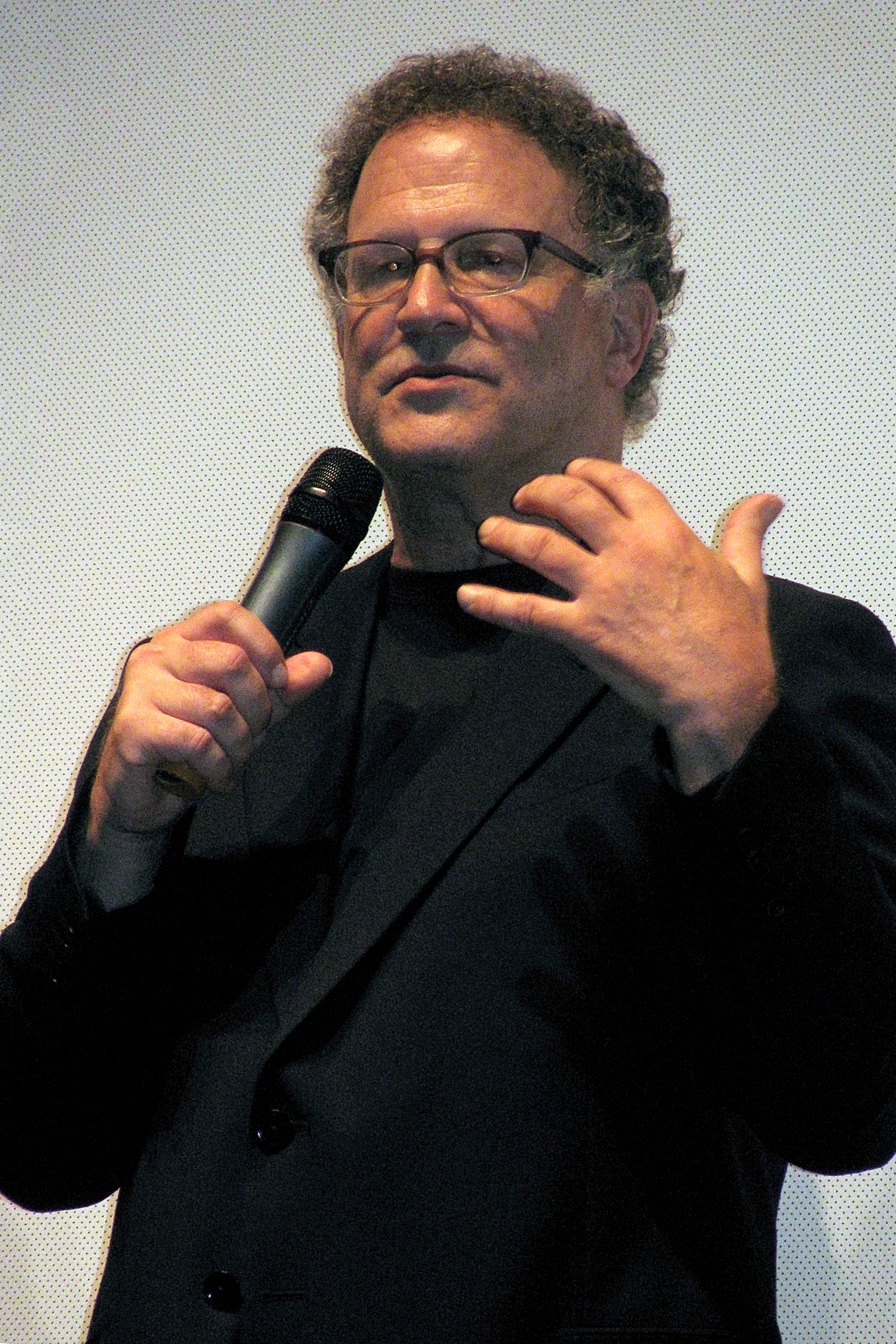
Albert Brooks

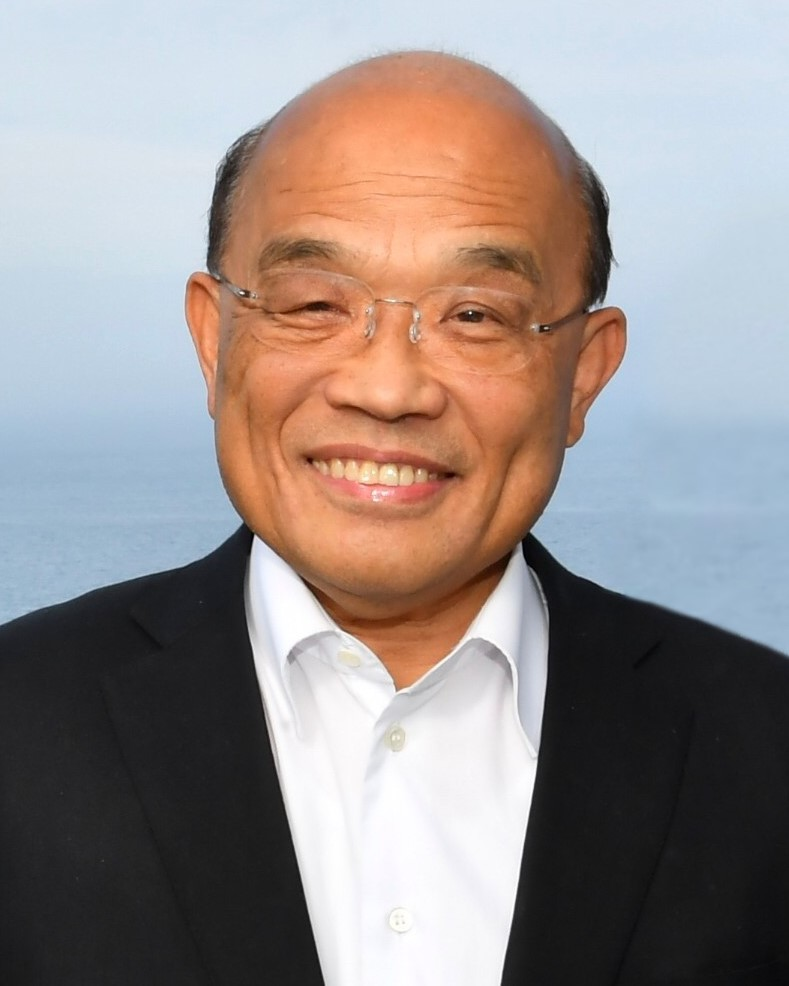
Su Tseng-chang

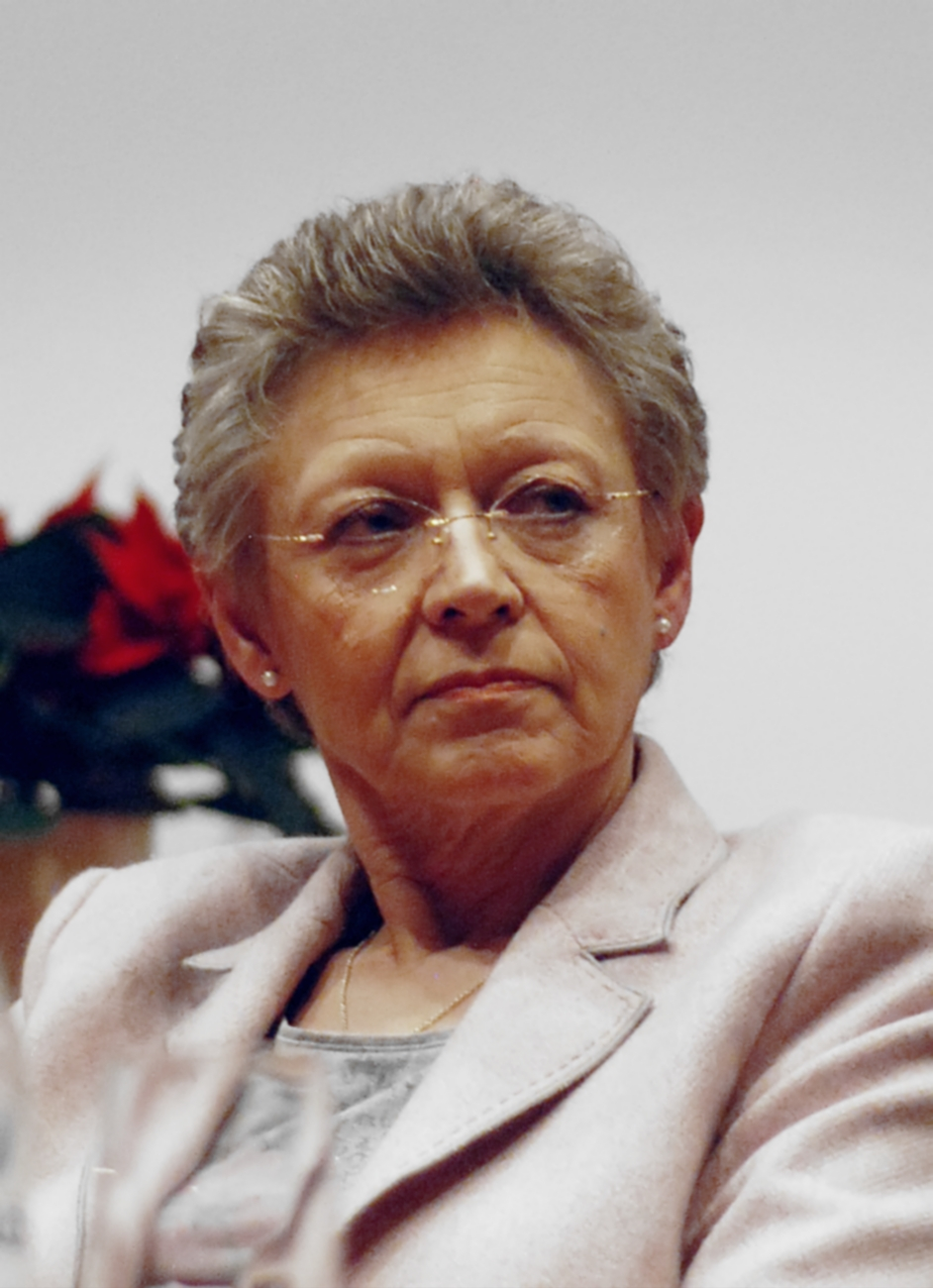
Françoise Barré-Sinoussi

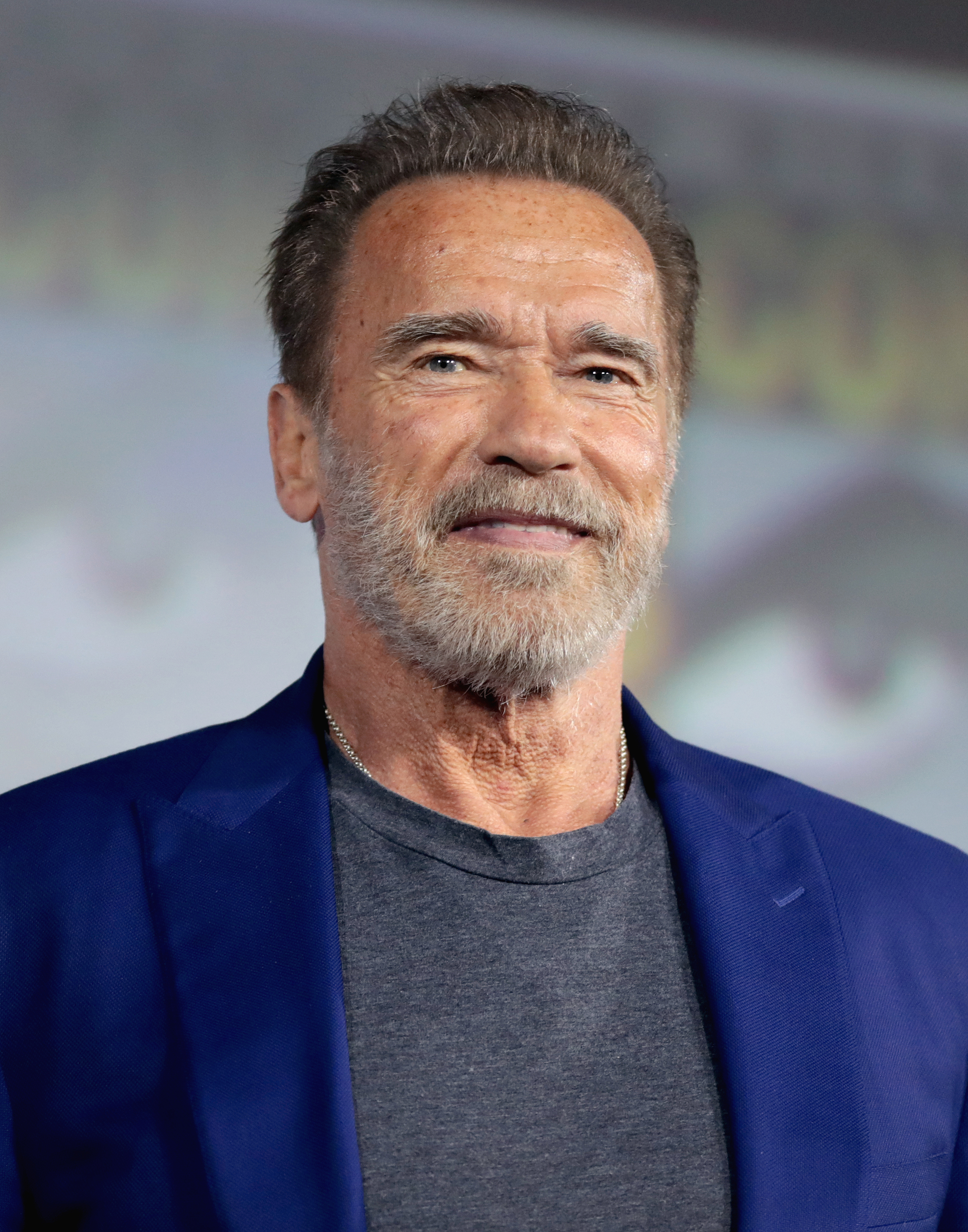
Arnold Schwarzenegger

- July 1
  - Marc Benno, American singer, songwriter and guitarist
  - Arantxa Urretabizkaia, Basque writer, screenwriter and actress
  - Sharad Yadav, Indian politician
- July 2 – Larry David, American actor, writer, producer and director (Curb Your Enthusiasm)
- July 3
  - Betty Buckley, American actress, singer
  - Mike Burton, American swimmer
  - Rob Rensenbrink, Dutch football player (d. 2020)
  - Jana Švandová, Czech actress
- July 4
  - Francisco Fernández de Cevallos, Mexican politician
  - Eva Goës, Swedish politician
  - Carla Panerai, Italian sprinter
- July 5 – Toos Beumer, Dutch swimmer
- July 6 – Shelley Hack, American model, actress, producer, political and media advisor
- July 7
  - Richard Beckinsale, English actor (d. 1979)
  - King Gyanendra of Nepal
  - Felix Standaert, Belgian diplomat
- July 9
  - Haruomi Hosono, Japanese musician (Yellow Magic Orchestra)
  - O. J. Simpson, African-American football player and actor (d. 2024)
- July 10
  - Allen Fong, Hong Kong film director
  - Arlo Guthrie, American folk singer ("Alice's Restaurant")
- July 11 – Riad Ismat, Syrian writer, critic and theatre director
- July 12
  - Gareth Edwards, Welsh rugby union player
  - Wilko Johnson, English rock musician (d. 2022)
  - Lenka Termerová, Czech actress
- July 14 – Navin Ramgoolam, Prime Minister of Mauritius
- July 15 – Roky Erickson, American singer-songwriter (d. 2019)
- July 16
  - Roelf Meyer, South African politician, businessman
  - Alexis Herman, American political figure and social worker (d. 2025)
- July 17 – Queen Camilla, Queen consort of the United Kingdom and the Commonwealth realms since 2022 as the wife of Charles III
- July 19 – Brian May, English rock guitarist (Queen)
- July 20
  - Gerd Binnig, German physicist, Nobel Prize laureate
  - Carlos Santana, Mexican-born rock guitarist
- July 21 – Co Adriaanse, Dutch football manager
- July 22
  - Albert Brooks, American actor, comedian, director, and novelist
  - Erica Gavin, American actress
  - Don Henley, American singer, songwriter and musician
- July 24 – Peter Serkin, American classical pianist (d. 2020)
- July 27
  - Bob Klein, American football player
  - Kazuyoshi Miura, Japanese businessman (d. 2008)
  - Giora Spiegel, Israeli footballer and coach
- July 28 – Su Tseng-chang, Taiwanese politician, 41st and 50th Premier of the Republic of China
- July 30
  - William Atherton, American actor
  - Françoise Barré-Sinoussi, French virologist, Nobel Prize laureate
  - Arnold Schwarzenegger, Austrian-American actor, bodybuilder and 38th Governor of California
- July 31 – Richard Griffiths, English actor (d. 2013)

=== August ===
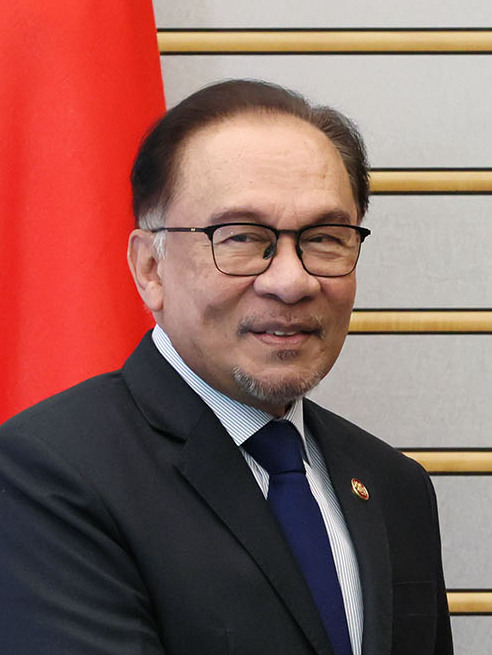
Anwar Ibrahim

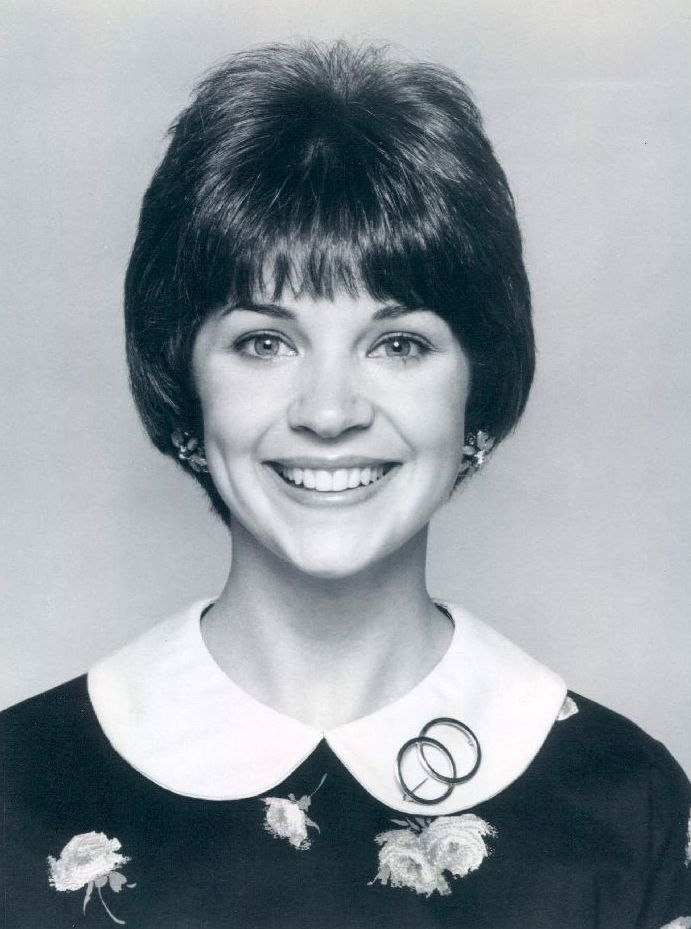
Cindy Williams

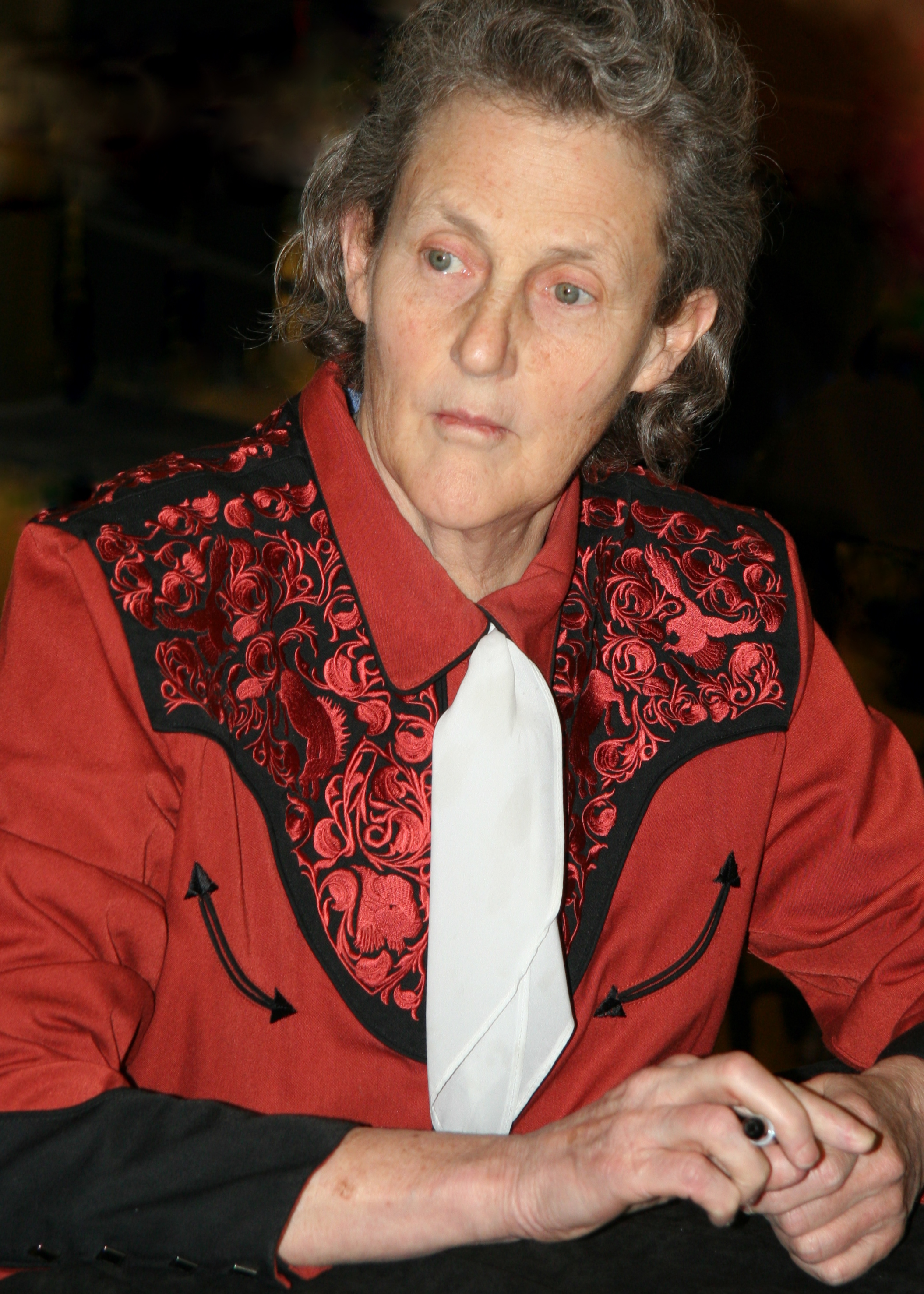
Temple Grandin

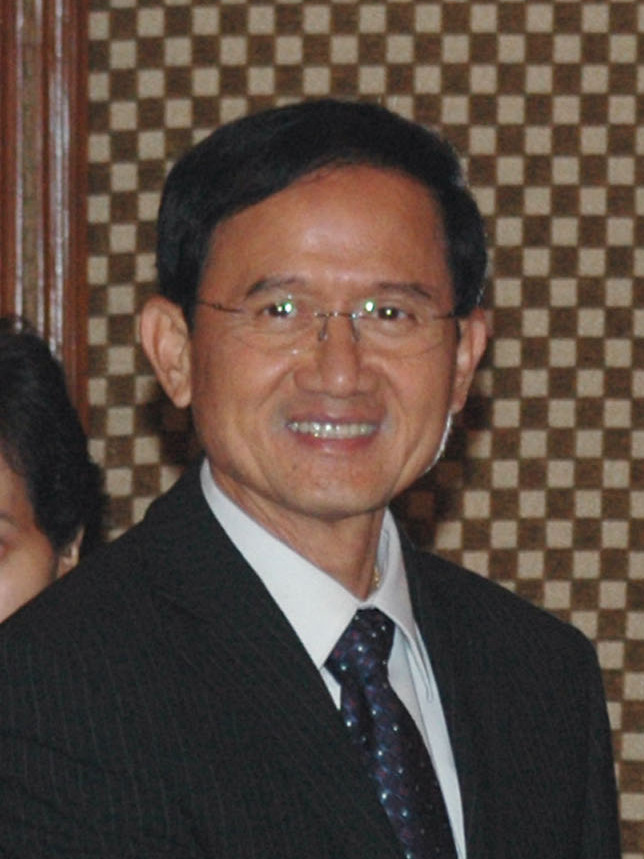
Somchai Wongsawat

- August 1
  - Lorna Goodison, Jamaican poet
  - Leoluca Orlando, Italian politician
- August 4 – Hubert Ingraham, Bahamian politician
- August 5 – Graham Lovett, English footballer (d. 2018)
- August 6 – Radhia Cousot, French computer scientist, invented abstract interpretation (d. 2014)
- August 7 – Franciscus Henri, Dutch-born Australian children's entertainer, composer and artist
- August 8
  - Terangi Adam, Nauruan politician
  - George Costigan, British actor, screenwriter
  - Ken Dryden, Canadian NHL goaltender, author and politician (d. 2025)
- August 9 – John Varley, American science-fiction author (d. 2025)
- August 10
  - Ian Anderson, British rock musician (Jethro Tull)
  - Drupi, Italian singer
  - Anwar Ibrahim, 10th Prime Minister of Malaysia
- August 11
  - Diether Krebs, German actor, cabaret artist and comedian (d. 2000)
  - Wilma van den Berg, Dutch sprinter
- August 14
  - Maddy Prior, English folk singer
  - Danielle Steel, American romance novelist
- August 15 – Raakhee, Indian actress
- August 16
  - Carol Moseley Braun, African-American politician
  - Marc Messier, Canadian actor (d. 2026)
- August 17 – Mohamed Abdelaziz, Sahrawi politician
- August 20 – José Wilker, Brazilian actor (d. 2014)
- August 21 – Mary Simon, Governor General of Canada
- August 22
  - Cindy Williams, American actress (Laverne and Shirley) (d. 2023)
  - Peter Irniq, Canadian Commissioner of Nunavut
- August 23 – Willy Russell, British playwright
- August 24 – Roger De Vlaeminck, Belgian cyclist
- August 26 – Nicolae Dobrin, Romanian footballer (d. 2007)
- August 28
  - Emlyn Hughes, English footballer (d. 2004)
  - Liza Wang, Hong Kong actress
  - Alice Playten, American actress (d. 2011)
- August 29
  - James Hunt, British 1976 Formula 1 world champion (d. 1993)
  - Temple Grandin, American animal welfare and autism expert
  - Jah Lloyd, Jamaican reggae singer, deejay and producer (d. 1999)
- August 30 – Allan Rock, Canadian politician, diplomat
- August 31
  - Ramón Castellano de Torres, Spanish painter
  - Somchai Wongsawat, 26th Prime Minister of Thailand

=== September ===
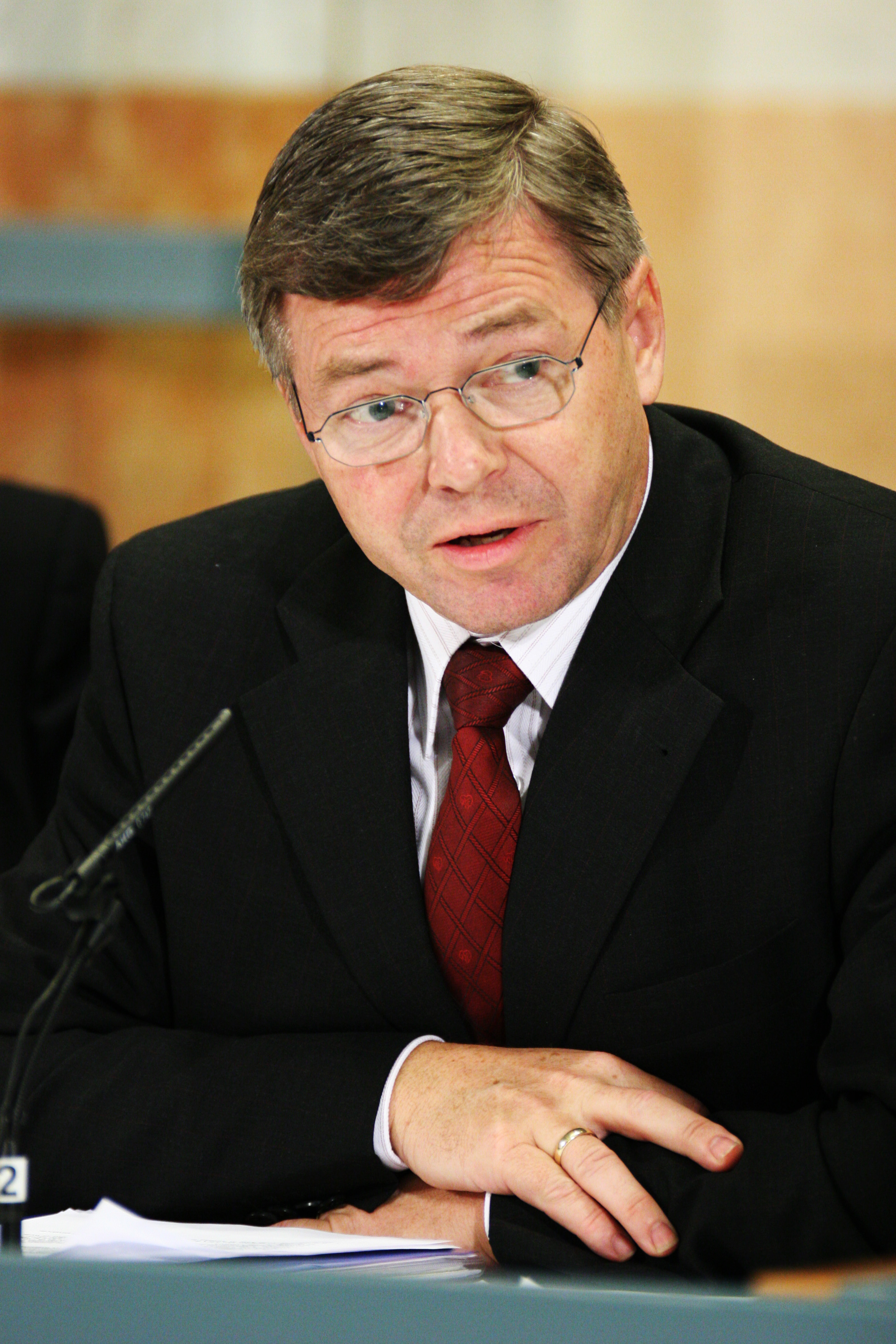
Kjell Magne Bondevik

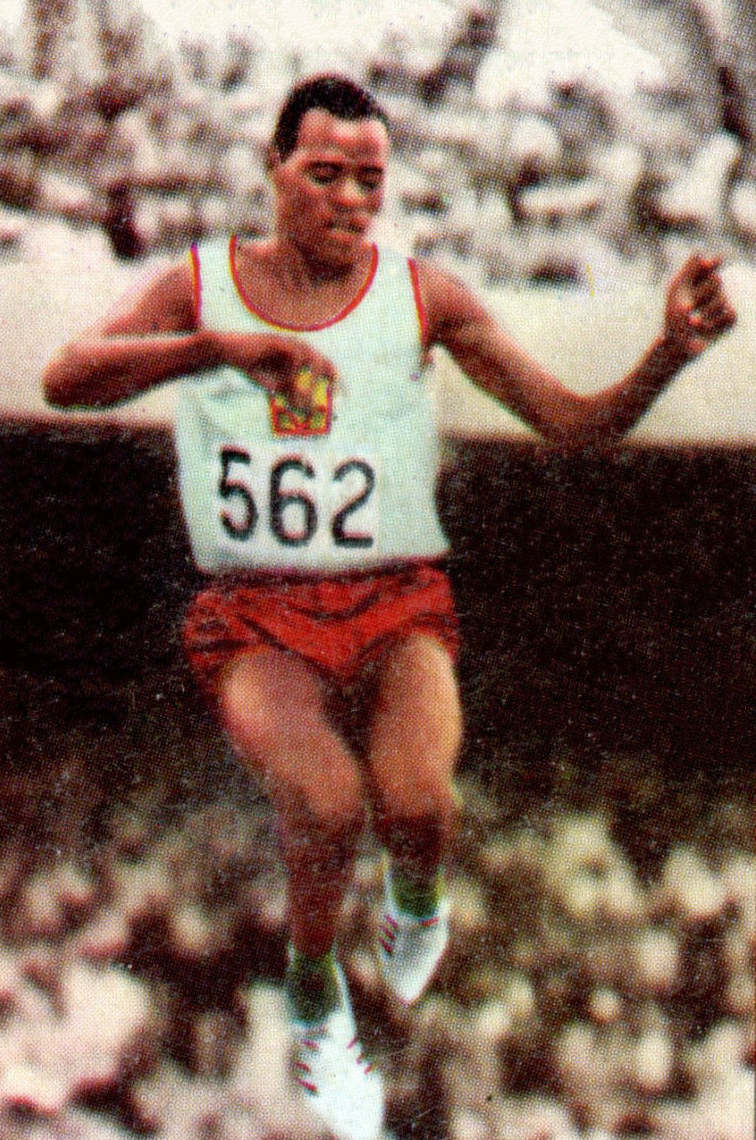
Amos Biwott

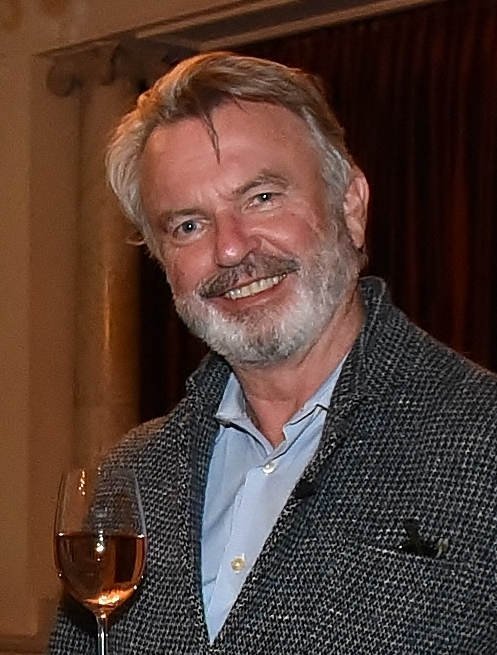
Sir Sam Neill

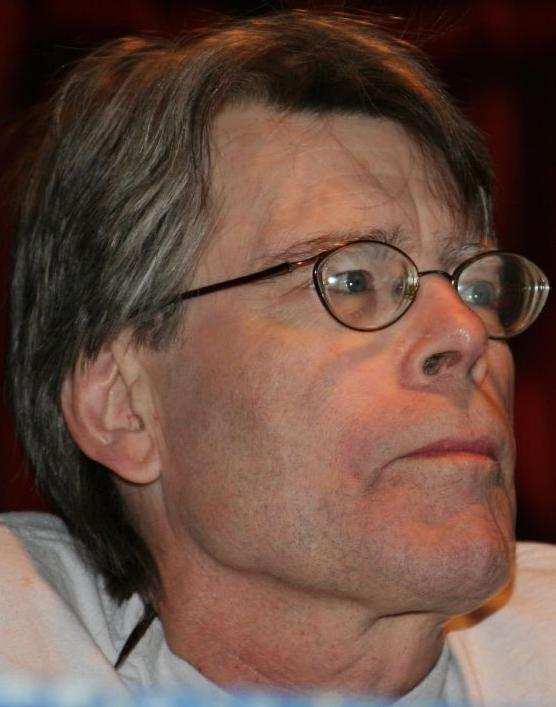
Stephen King

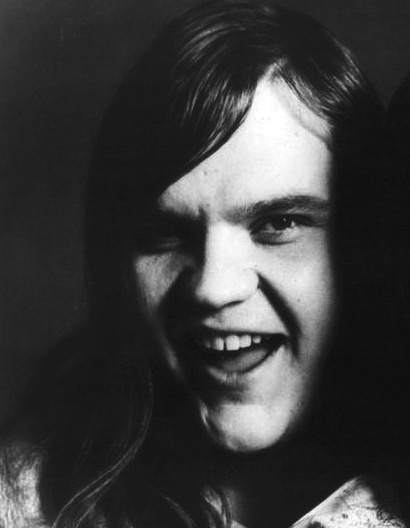
Meat Loaf

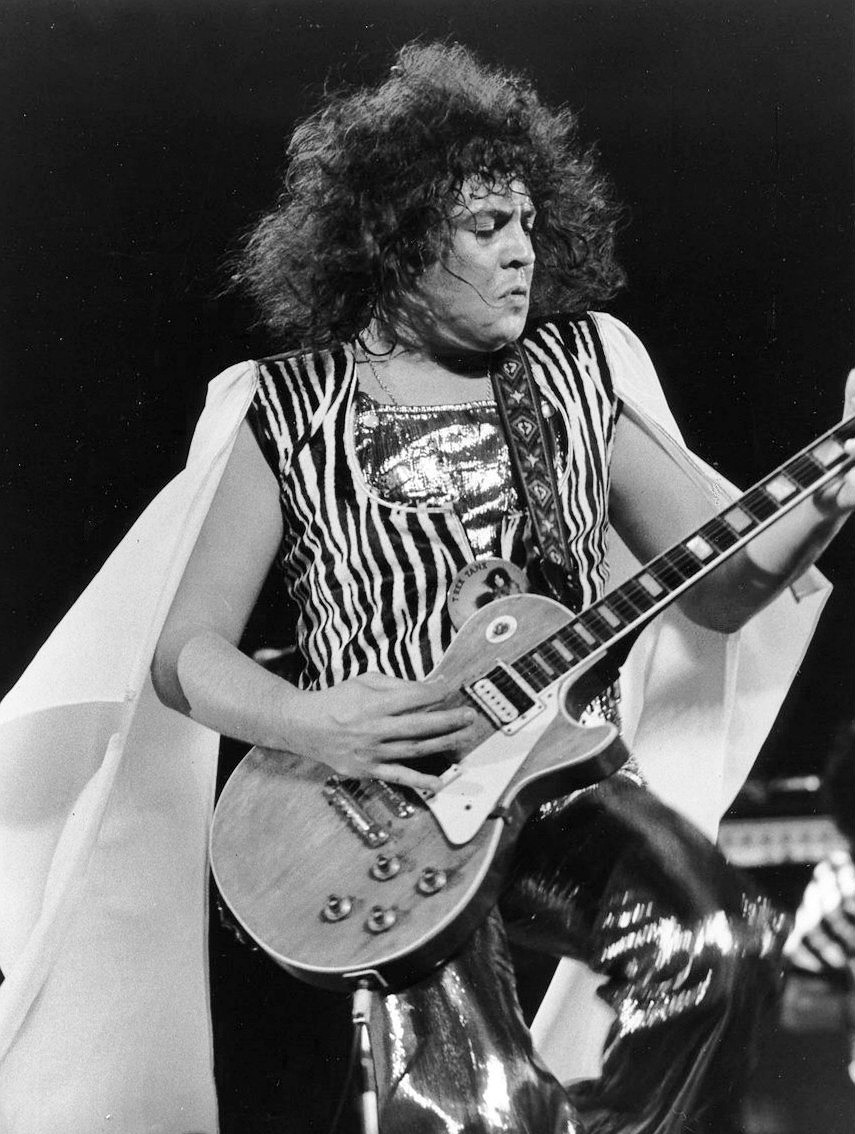
Marc Bolan

- September 3 – Kjell Magne Bondevik, Prime Minister of Norway
- September 5
  - Danny Florencio, Filipino basketball player (d. 2018)
  - Buddy Miles, African-American drummer, singer and composer (d. 2008)
  - Kiyoshi Takayama, Japanese yakuza boss
- September 6
  - Jane Curtin, American actress, comedian (Saturday Night Live)
  - Bruce Rioch, Scottish footballer, coach
  - Jacob Rubinovitz, Israeli scientist (d. 2018)
- September 8 – Amos Biwott, Kenyan Olympic athlete
- September 10 – Maria Baliszewska, Polish ethnomusicologist and journalist (d. 2026)
- September 13 – Ajib Ahmad, Malaysian politician (d. 2011)
- September 14
  - Sam Neill, British-born New Zealand actor (d. 2026)
  - Jerzy Popieluszko, Polish Roman Catholic priest and blessed (d. 1984)
- September 16 – Russ Abbot, British comedian, actor and singer
- September 19 – Tanith Lee, British author (d. 2015)
- September 21
  - Don Felder, American musician and songwriter
  - Stephen King, American writer and novelist, specializing in the horror genre
- September 22 – Jo Beverley, Anglo-Canadian writer (d. 2016)
- September 23 – Mary Kay Place, American actress
- September 25
  - Cheryl Tiegs, American model, actress
  - Cecil Womack, African-American singer, songwriter (Womack & Womack) (d. 2013)
- September 26 – Lynn Anderson, American country music singer (d. 2015)
- September 27
  - Dick Advocaat, Dutch football manager
  - Meat Loaf, American rock singer, actor (d. 2022)
  - Denis Lawson, Scottish actor and director
- September 28
  - Luhut Binsar Pandjaitan, Indonesian politician and former military officer
  - Marcelo Guinle, Argentine politician (d. 2017)
  - Sheikh Hasina, 10th Prime Minister of Bangladesh
- September 30
  - Marc Bolan, English rock musician (d. 1977)
  - Rula Lenska, English actress

=== October ===
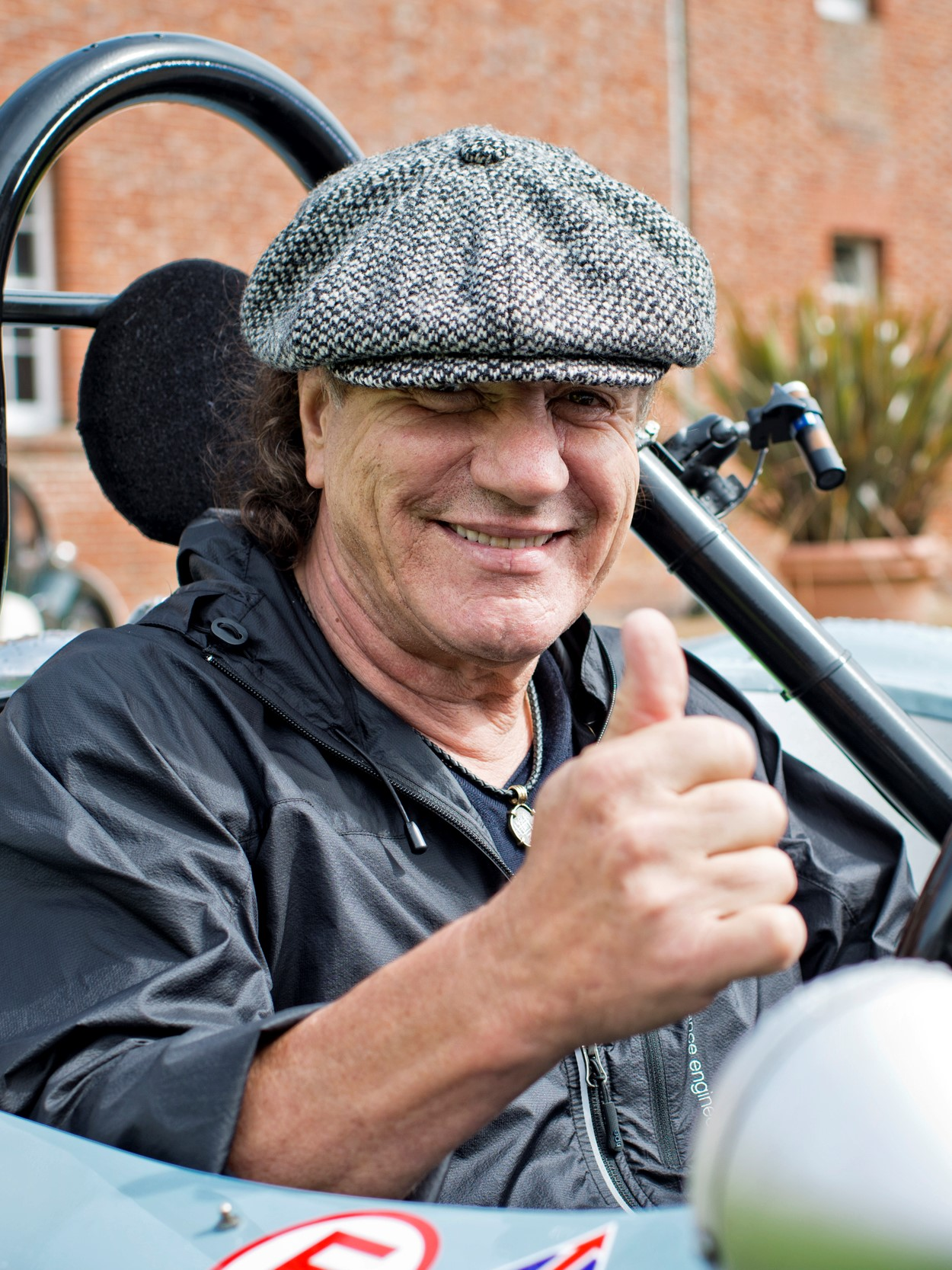
Brian Johnson

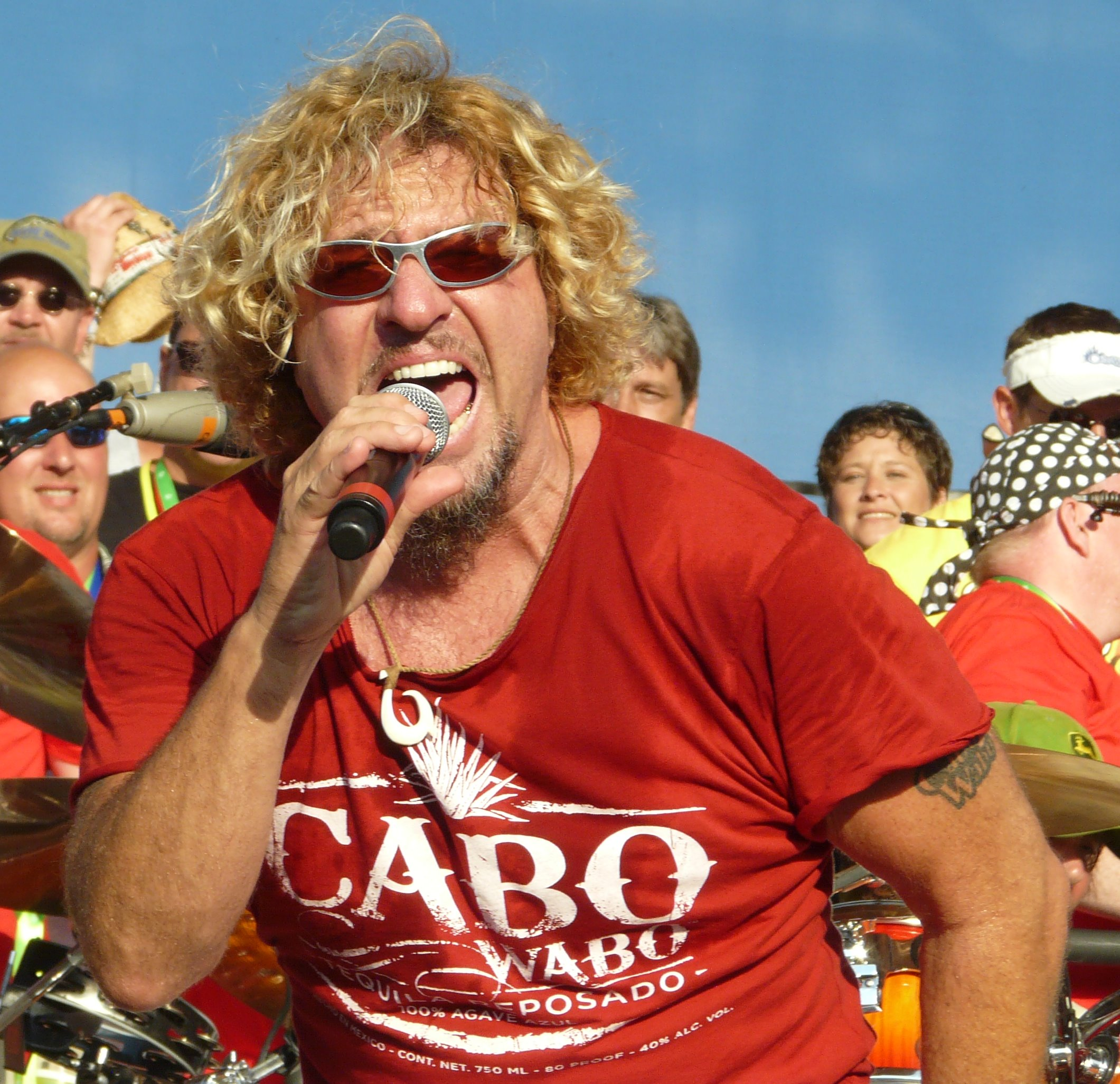
Sammy Hagar

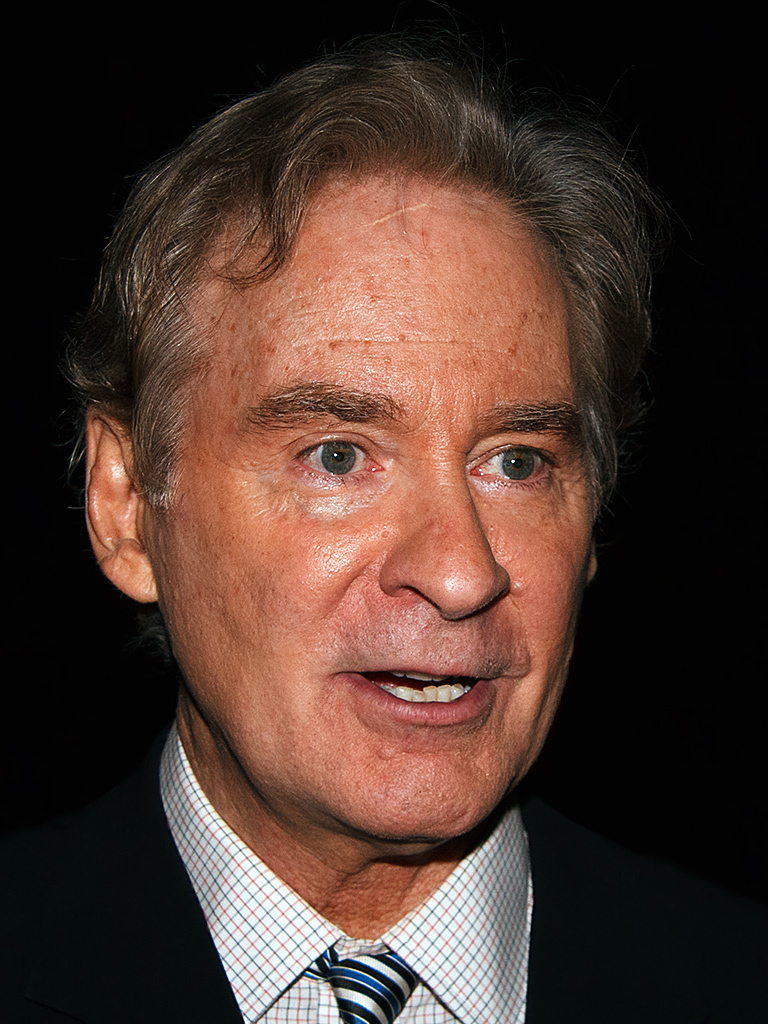
Kevin Kline

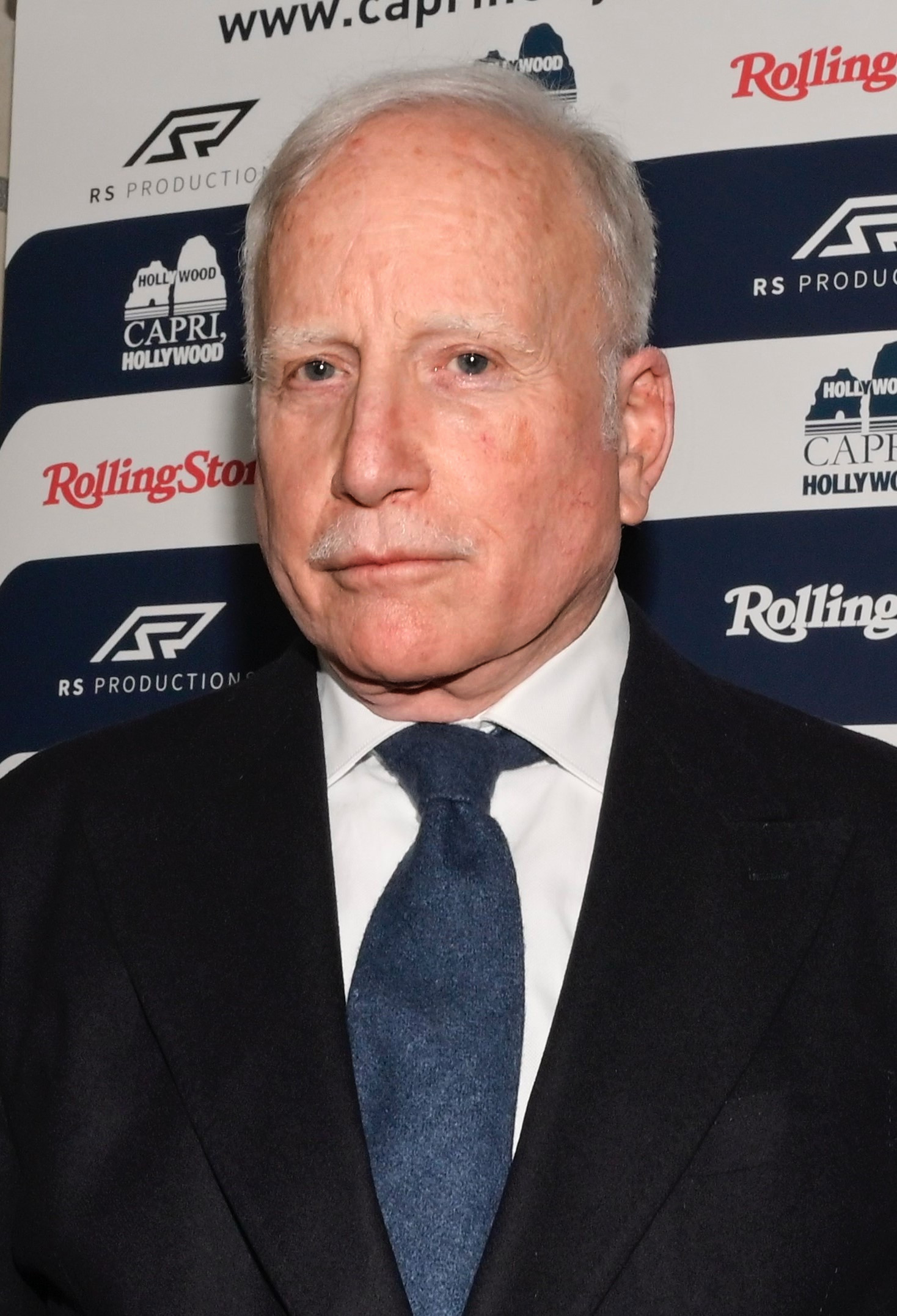
Richard Dreyfuss

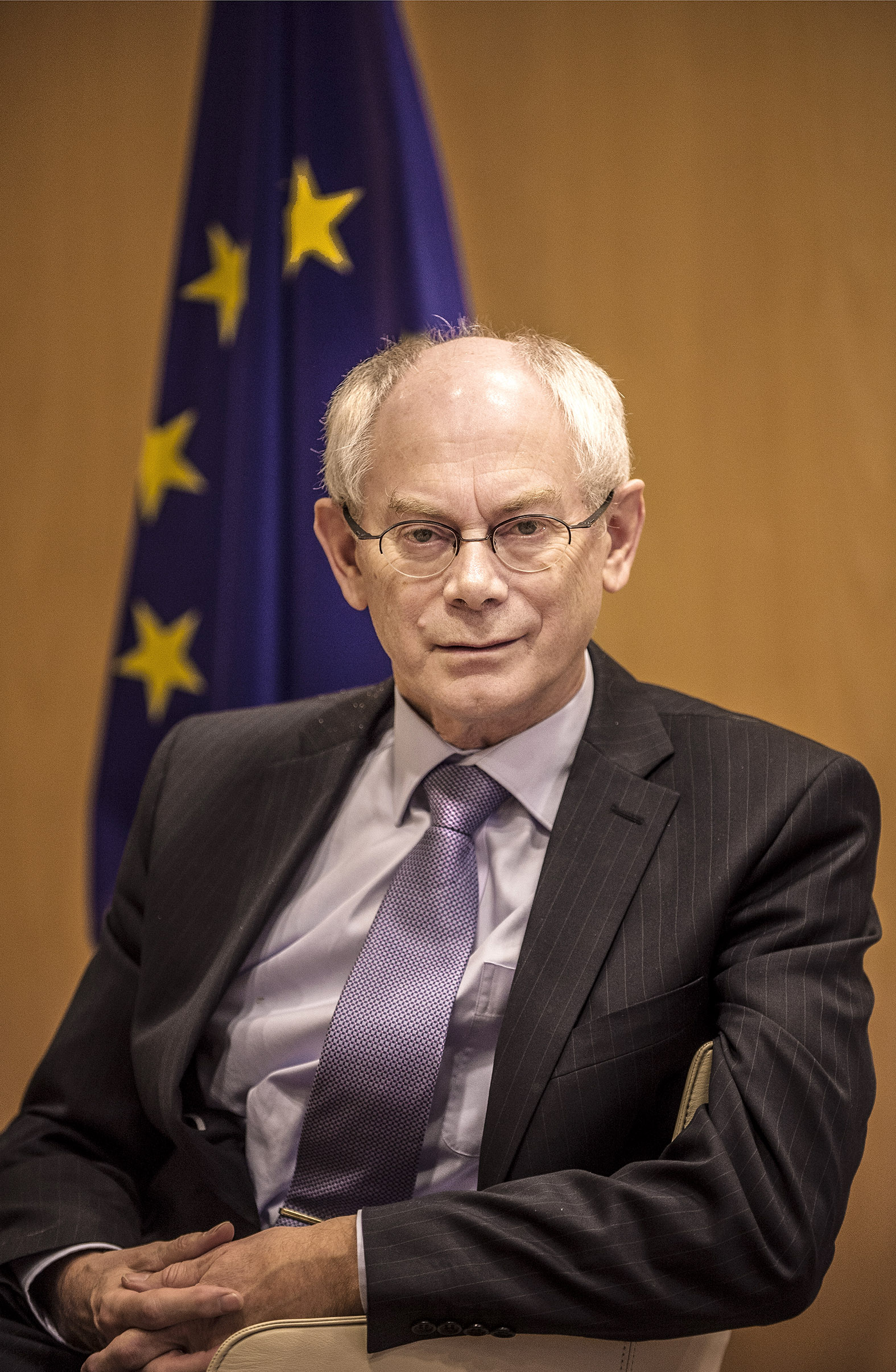
Herman Van Rompuy

- October 1
  - Aaron Ciechanover, Israeli biologist, Nobel Prize in Chemistry winner
  - Stephen Collins, American actor
  - Mariska Veres, Dutch singer (d. 2006)
- October 2 – Ward Churchill, American author, activist
- October 3
  - Alain Mucchielli, French physician
  - Fred DeLuca, American entrepreneur, co-founder of Subway (d. 2015)
  - John Perry Barlow, American internet activist, writer, and lyricist (d. 2018)
- October 4 – Ann Widdecombe, British politician (d. 2026)
- October 5 – Brian Johnson, English rock singer (AC/DC)
- October 9 – France Gall, French singer (d. 2018)
- October 13 – Sammy Hagar, American rock musician (Montrose and Van Halen)
- October 14 – Nikolai Volkoff, Croatian-Russian professional wrestler (d. 2018)
- October 17 – Simi Garewal, Indian actress, producer, director, and talk show host
- October 18
  - James H. Fallon, American neuroscientist
  - Job Cohen, Dutch politician
- October 19
  - Giorgio Cavazzano, Italian comics artist and illustrator
  - Gunnar Staalesen, Norwegian author
- October 24 – Kevin Kline, American actor
- October 26
  - Hillary Clinton, American politician, First Lady, US Senator (D-Ny.), Secretary of State, and 2016 Democratic presidential candidate
  - Ene Järvis, Estonian actress
- October 28 – Henri Michel, French football player and coach (d. 2018)
- October 29 – Richard Dreyfuss, American actor
- October 30
  - Numa Turcatti, Uruguayan law student, victim of the Uruguayan Air Force Flight 571 crash (d. 1972).
  - Timothy B. Schmit, American musician
- October 31
  - Carmen Alborch, Spanish feminist, writer and politician (d. 2018)
  - Herman Van Rompuy, Belgian politician, 66th Prime Minister of Belgium

=== November ===
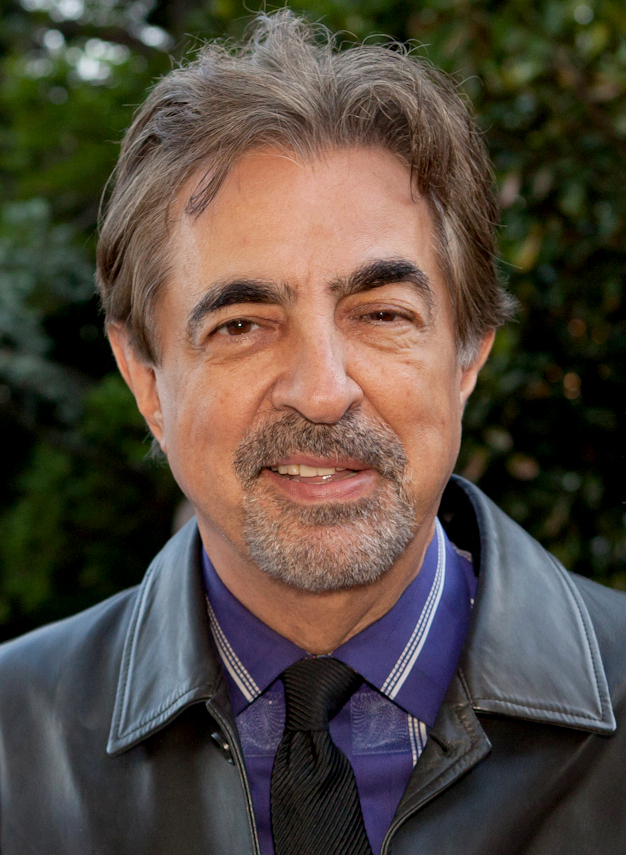
Joe Mantegna

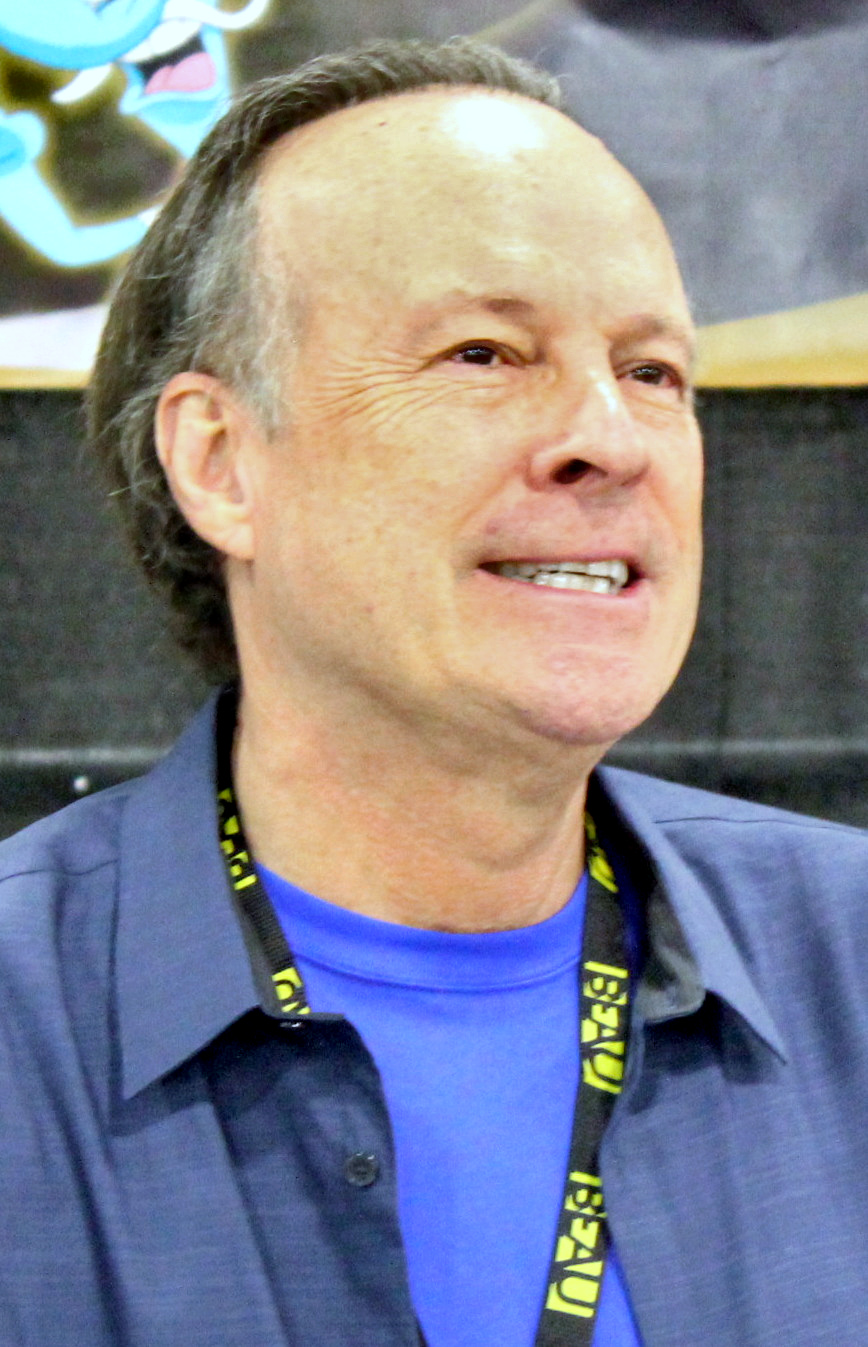
Dwight Schultz

- November 1
  - Taizo Ichinose, Japanese war photographer (d. 1973)
  - Bob Weston, British musician (d. 2012)
- November 3 – Mazie Hirono, US Senator
- November 5 – Rubén Juárez, Argentine bandoneonist, singer and songwriter of tango (d. 2010)
- November 6 – E. Lee Spence, German-born American pioneer underwater archaeologist, treasure hunter
- November 7
  - Yutaka Fukumoto, Japanese professional baseball player
  - Usha Uthup, Indian singer
  - Sondhi Limthongkul, Thai journalist, writer and founder of Manager Daily
  - Sefi Rivlin, Israeli actor, footballer and comedian (d. 2013)
- November 8 – Minnie Riperton, African-American singer (d. 1979)
- November 10
  - Glen Buxton, American rock guitarist (d. 1997)
  - Greg Lake, English musician, producer (King Crimson, Emerson, Lake & Palmer) (d. 2016)
- November 12 – Carlos Ezquerra, Spanish comics artist (d. 2018)
- November 13 – Joe Mantegna, American actor, producer and director
- November 14 – P. J. O'Rourke, American journalist, satirist (d. 2022)
- November 15
  - Steven G. Kellman, American author, critic
  - Bill Richardson, American politician and diplomat, United States Ambassador to the United Nations (d. 2023)
- November 17
  - Will Vinton, American animator, filmmaker (d. 2018)
  - Inky Mark, Canadian politician
- November 18
  - Lim Boon Heng, Singaporean politician
  - Ali Bakar, Malaysian football player (d. 2003)
- November 19 – Anfinn Kallsberg, Faroese Prime Minister (d. 2024)
- November 20
  - Joe Walsh, American rock singer, songwriter and guitarist
  - Nurlan Balgimbayev, Kazakh politician (d. 2015)
- November 21
  - Alcione, Brazilian singer
  - Nickolas Grace, British actor
  - Chua Ek Kay, Singaporean painter (d. 2008)
- November 22 – Terje Rød-Larsen, Norwegian diplomat, politician and sociologist
- November 24 – Dwight Schultz, American actor (The A-Team)
- November 25 – John Larroquette, American actor (Night Court)
- November 27 – Clare Torry, English singer and songwriter
- November 29 – Mirza Khazar, Azerbaijani author
- November 30
  - Sergio Badilla Castillo, Chilean poet
  - Stuart Baird, English film editor, producer and director
  - Véronique Le Flaguais, Canadian actress
  - David Mamet, American playwright
  - Moses Nagamootoo, 8th Prime Minister of Guyana

=== December ===
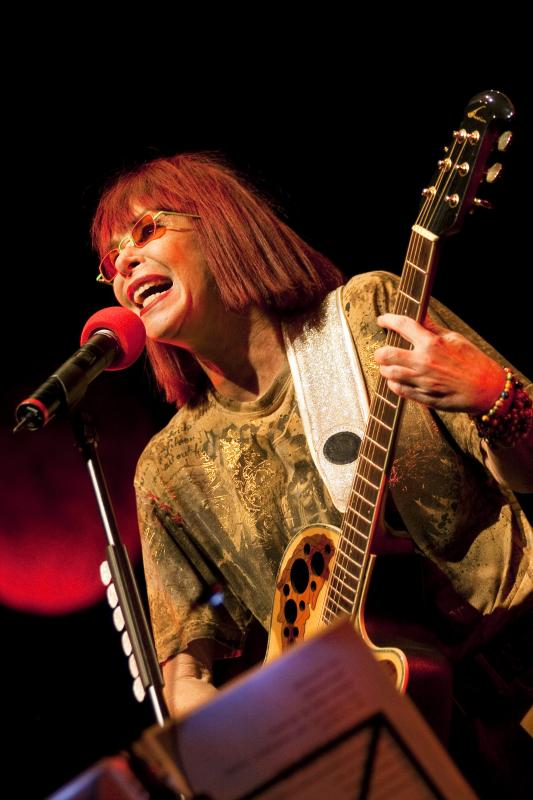
Rita Lee

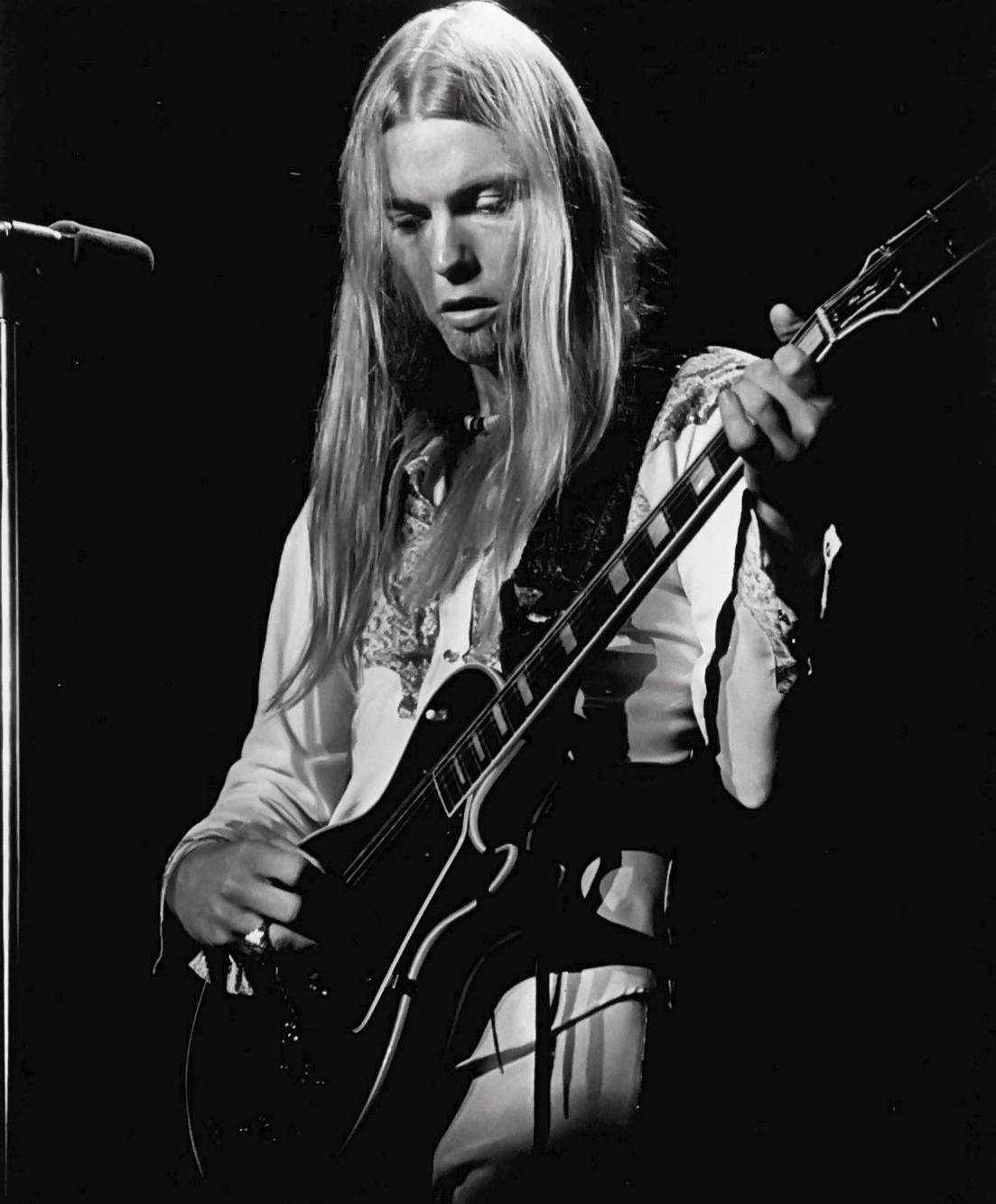
Gregg Allman

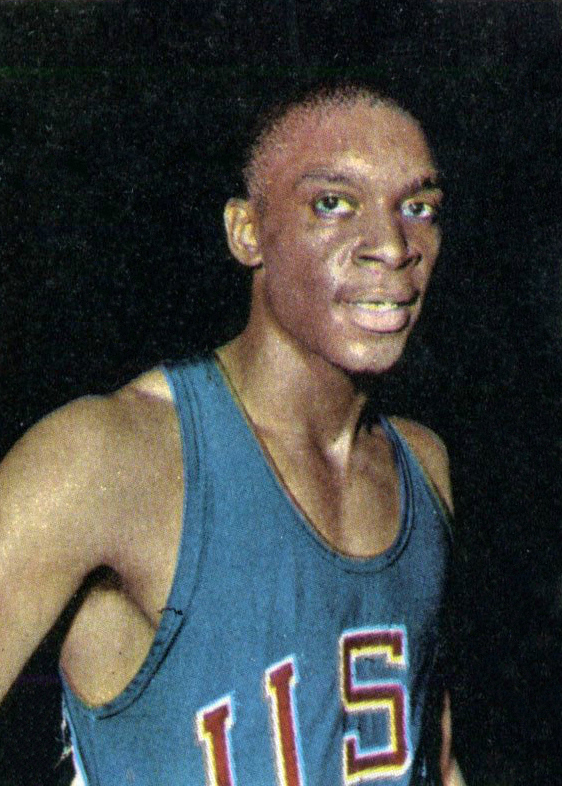
Vincent Matthews

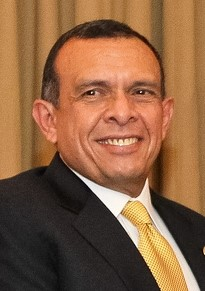
Porfirio Lobo Sosa

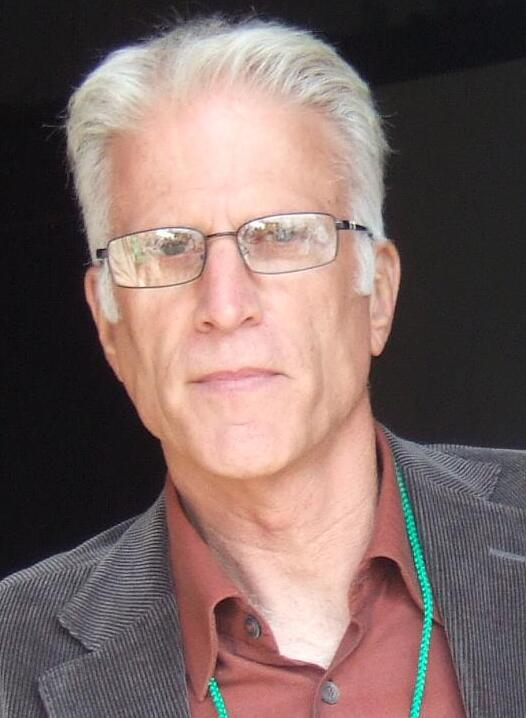
Ted Danson

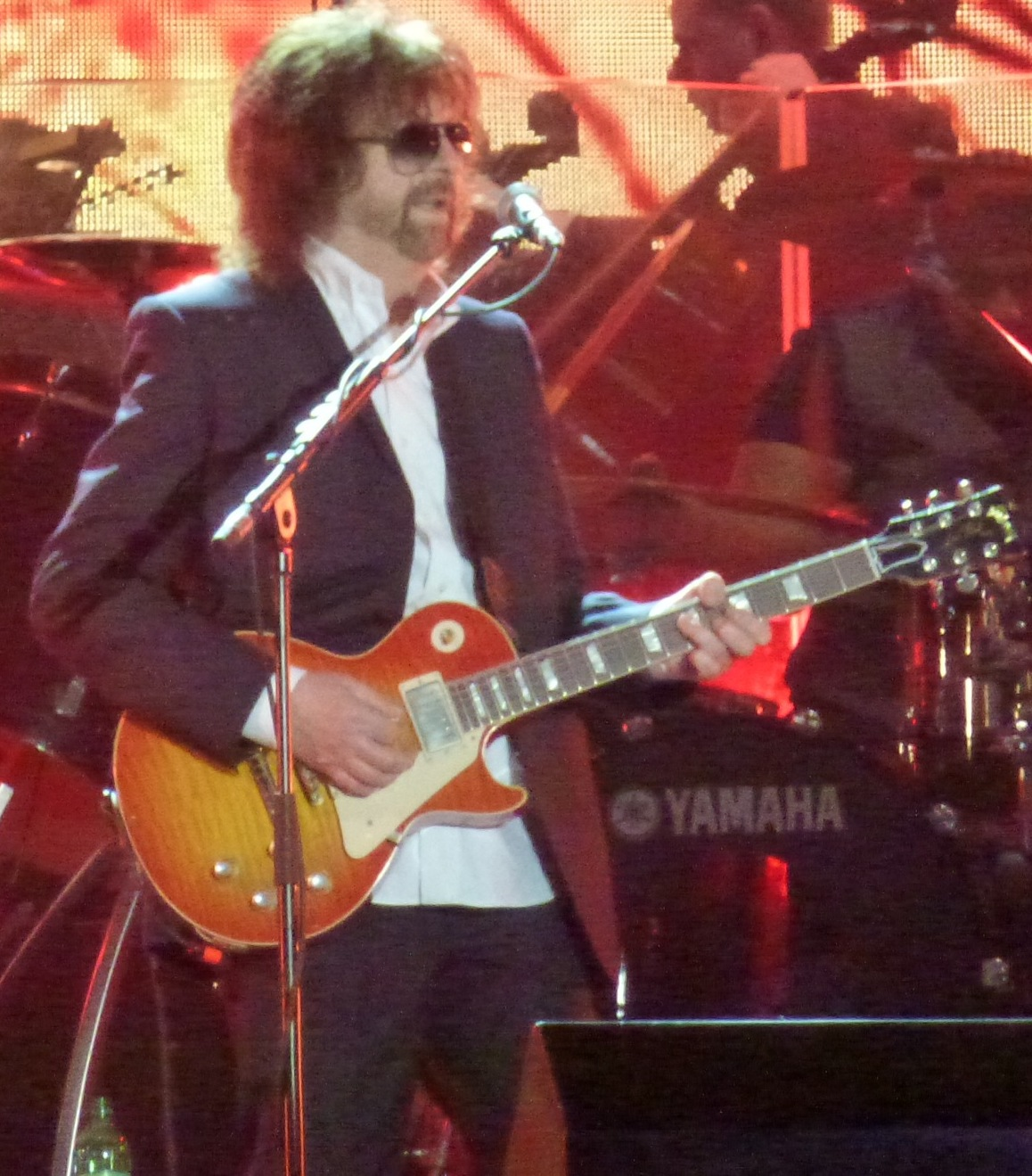
Jeff Lynne

- December 1 – Bob Fulton, English-Australian rugby league player (d. 2021)
- December 2 – Isaac Bitton, French rock drummer
- December 6 – Romildo Ribeiro Soares, Brazilian televangelist, missionary, author, singer, businessman and composer
- December 7
  - Oliver Dragojević, Croatian singer (d. 2018)
  - Johnny Bench, American baseball player
  - Wendy Padbury, British actress
  - Jeff Maxwell, American actor (M*A*S*H)
- December 8
  - Gregg Allman, American singer, songwriter and musician (d. 2017)
  - Gérard Blanc, French singer
  - Thomas R. Cech, American chemist, Nobel Prize laureate
- December 9 – Tom Daschle, U.S. Senator
- December 10 – Rainer Seifert, German field hockey player
- December 12
  - Will Alsop, English architect
  - Carmen Zuleta, Venezuelan judge
- December 14
  - Christopher Parkening, American guitarist
  - Dilma Rousseff, 36th President of Brazil
- December 16
  - Ben Cross, English actor (d. 2020)
  - Vincent Matthews, American athlete
  - Trevor Żahra, Maltese novelist, poet and illustrator
- December 18 – Leonid Yuzefovich, Russian crime fiction writer
- December 21 – Paco de Lucía, Spanish guitarist (d. 2014)
- December 22
  - Mitsuo Tsukahara, Japanese gymnast
  - Porfirio Lobo, 54th President of Honduras
- December 25 – Pepe Smith, Filipino rock musician (d. 2019)
- December 28 – Aurelio Rodríguez, Mexican Major League Baseball player (d. 2000)
- December 29
  - Ted Danson, American actor (Cheers)
  - Cozy Powell, English drummer (d. 1998)
- December 30 – Jeff Lynne, British musician (Electric Light Orchestra)
- December 31
  - Rita Lee, Brazilian rock singer, composer (d. 2023)
  - Tim Matheson, American actor, film director and producer
  - Burton Cummings, Canadian musician

=== Date unknown ===
- Marouf al-Bakhit, twice Prime Minister of Jordan

== Deaths ==
=== January ===
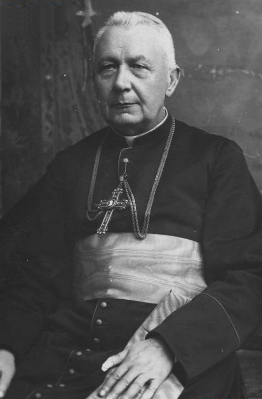
Blessed Hryhoriy Khomyshyn

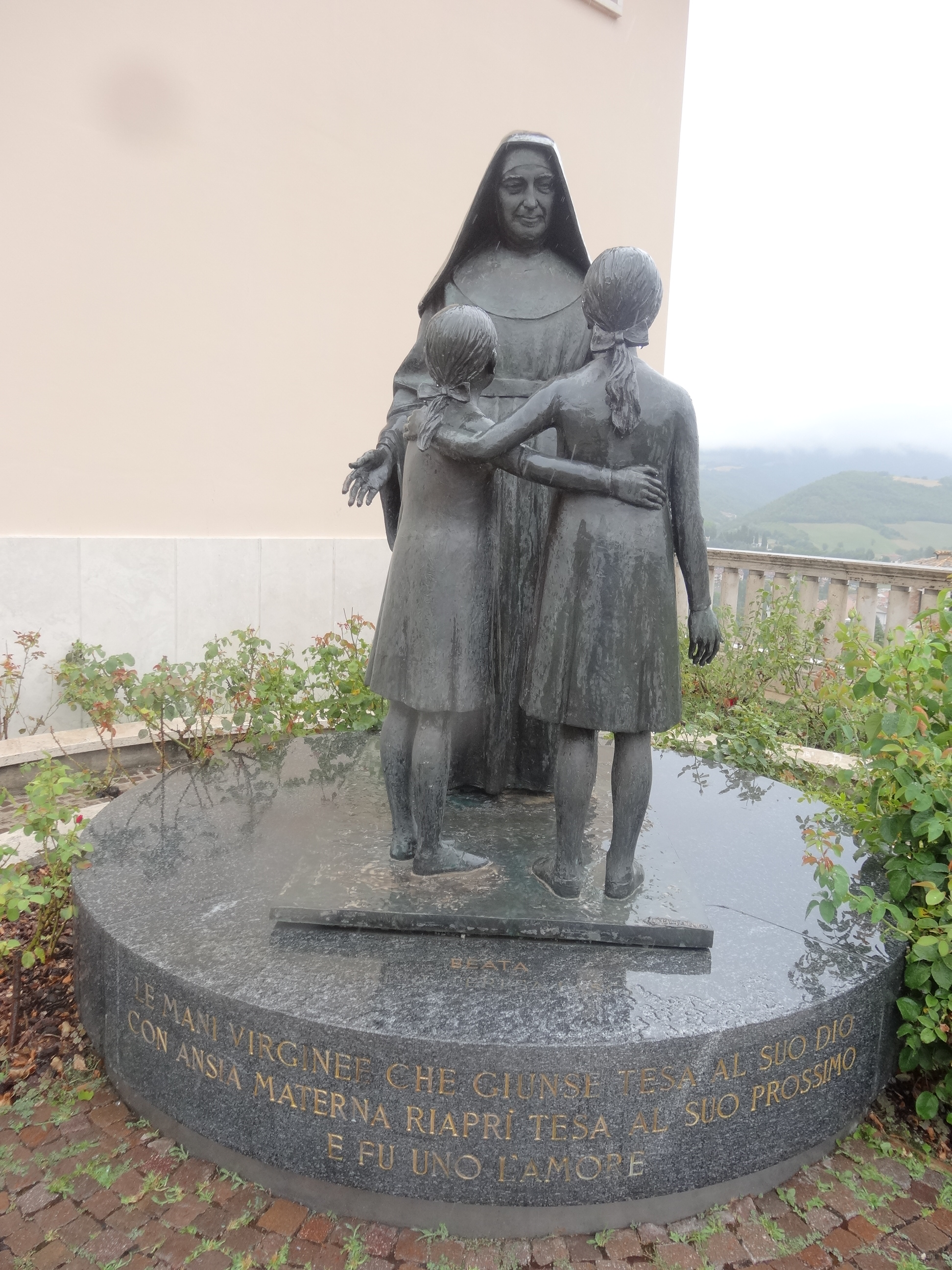
Blessed Maria Giovanna Fasce

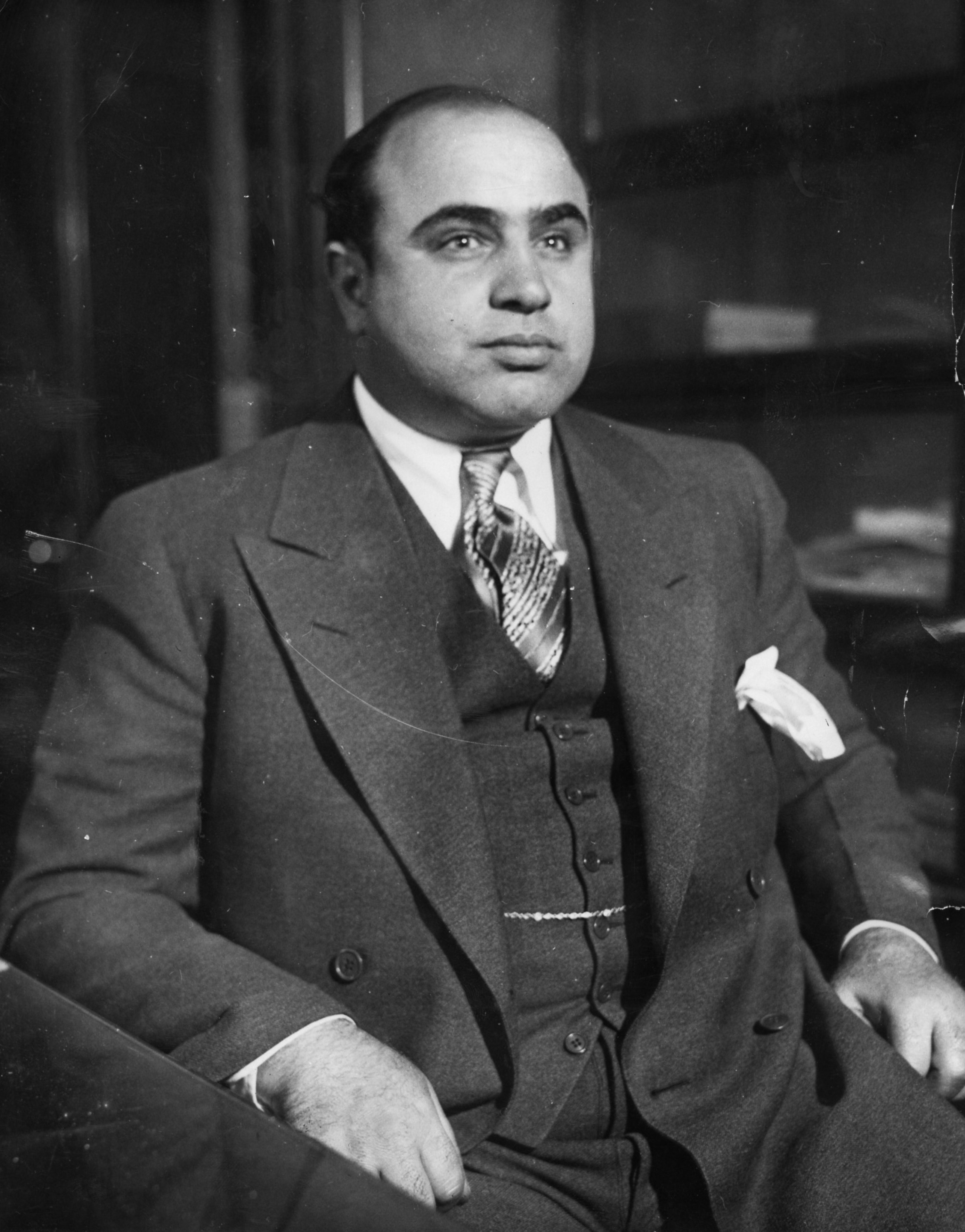
Al Capone

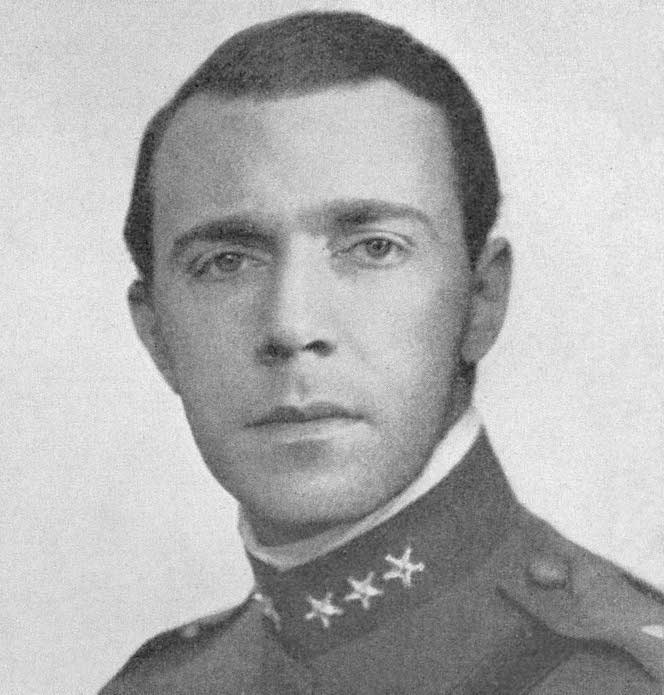
Prince Gustaf Adolf, Duke of Västerbotten

- January 3 – Al Herpin, French-born American insomniac, "The Man Who Never Slept" (b. 1862)
- January 9
  - Herman Bing, German actor (b. 1889)
  - Karl Mannheim, Hungarian sociologist (b. 1893)
- January 10
  - Arthur E. Andersen, American accountant (b. 1885)
  - Hanns Sachs, Austrian psychoanalyst (b. 1881)
- January 11 – Eva Tanguay, Canadian-born vaudeville performer (b. 1878)
- January 12
  - Zdenko Blažeković, Yugoslavian politician (executed) (b. 1915)
  - Júlio Afrânio Peixoto, Brazilian physician, writer, politician and historian (b. 1876)
  - Rosa Smith Eigenmann, American ichthyologist (b. 1858)
- January 13
  - Sixto María Durán Cárdenas, Ecuadorian pianist, composer and lawyer (b. 1875)
  - Ignazio Lupo, Italian-born American gangster (b. 1877)
- January 14
  - Bill Hewitt, American football player (Chicago Bears), Pro Football Hall of Fame member (b. 1909)
  - Elizabeth Short (Black Dahlia), American murder victim (b. 1924)
  - Gustave Mathieu, French anarchist illegalist, suspected of being one of Ravachol's main accomplices (b. 1866)
- January 17 – Hryhoriy Khomyshyn, Ukrainian Roman Catholic bishop, martyr and blessed (b. 1867)
- January 18 – Maria Giovanna Fasce, Italian Roman Catholic religious professed, Augustinian nun and blessed (b. 1881)
- January 19 – Manuel Machado, Spanish poet (b. 1874)
- January 20
  - Josh Gibson, African-American baseball player, MLB Hall of Fame member (b. 1911)
  - Andrew Volstead, American politician (b. 1860)
- January 22 – Vivienne Haigh-Wood Eliot, British writer (b. 1888)
- January 23
  - Pierre Bonnard, French painter (b. 1867)
  - Roy Geiger, American general (b. 1885)
- January 24 – August Meyszner, Austrian-born SS officer (executed) (b. 1886)
- January 25 – Al Capone, American gangster (b. 1899)
- January 26
  - Grace Moore, American opera singer, actress (b. 1898)
  - Prince Gustaf Adolf, Duke of Västerbotten (b. 1906)
  - Gerrit Johannes Geysendorffer, Dutch aviation pioneer (b. 1892)
- January 27 – Vassily Balabanov, Soviet administrator, Provincial Governor of Imperial Russia (b. 1873)
- January 28 – Reynaldo Hahn, Venezuelan-born French composer (b. 1874)
- January 30 – Frederick Blackman, British plant physiologist (b. 1866)

=== February ===
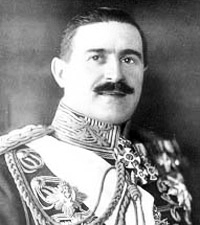
Petar Živković

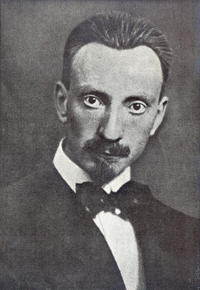
Luigi Russolo

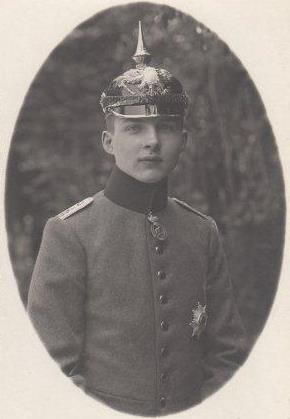
Joachim Ernst, Duke of Anhalt

- February 3 – Petar Živković, Yugoslav politician, 11th Prime Minister of Yugoslavia (b. 1879)
- February 6
  - O. Max Gardner, Governor of North Carolina (b. 1882)
  - Luigi Russolo, Italian Futurist painter, composer (b. 1885)
- February 11
  - Martin Klein, Estonian wrestler (b. 1884)
  - Ernest Terah Hooley, English fraudster (b. 1859)
- February 12
  - Kurt Lewin, German-born American psychologist (b. 1890)
  - Sidney Toler, American actor (b. 1874)
- February 14 – Celestina Boninsegna, Italian soprano (b. 1877)
- February 15 – Mustafa Abdel-Razek, Egyptian Islamic philosopher (b. 1885)
- February 16
  - Pedro de Répide Gallegos, Spanish journalist, writer (b. 1853)
  - Bertha Schwarz, German soprano (b. 1855)
- February 18
  - Valentina Dmitryeva, Soviet writer, teacher and doctor (b. 1859)
  - Joachim Ernst, Duke of Anhalt (b. 1901)
- February 19 – James W. Bagley, American aerial photographer, topographic engineer and inventor (b. 1881)
- February 20
  - Henry Herbert, British actor (b. 1879)
  - Viktor Gutić, Croatian fascist official (b. 1901)
- February 23 – Hakim Habibur Rahman, Indian physician, writer, journalist and politician (b. 1881)
- February 24
  - Morinosuke Chiwaki, Japanese dentist (b. 1870)
  - Pierre Janet, French psychologist (b. 1859)
- February 26
  - Antonino D'Agata, Italian politician (b. 1882)
  - Heinrich Häberlin, Swiss politician, president of the Federal Council (b. 1868)
  - Ben Webster, British-born American actor (b. 1864)
- February 27 – Heinrich Häberlin, Swiss Federal Councilor (b. 1868)

=== March ===
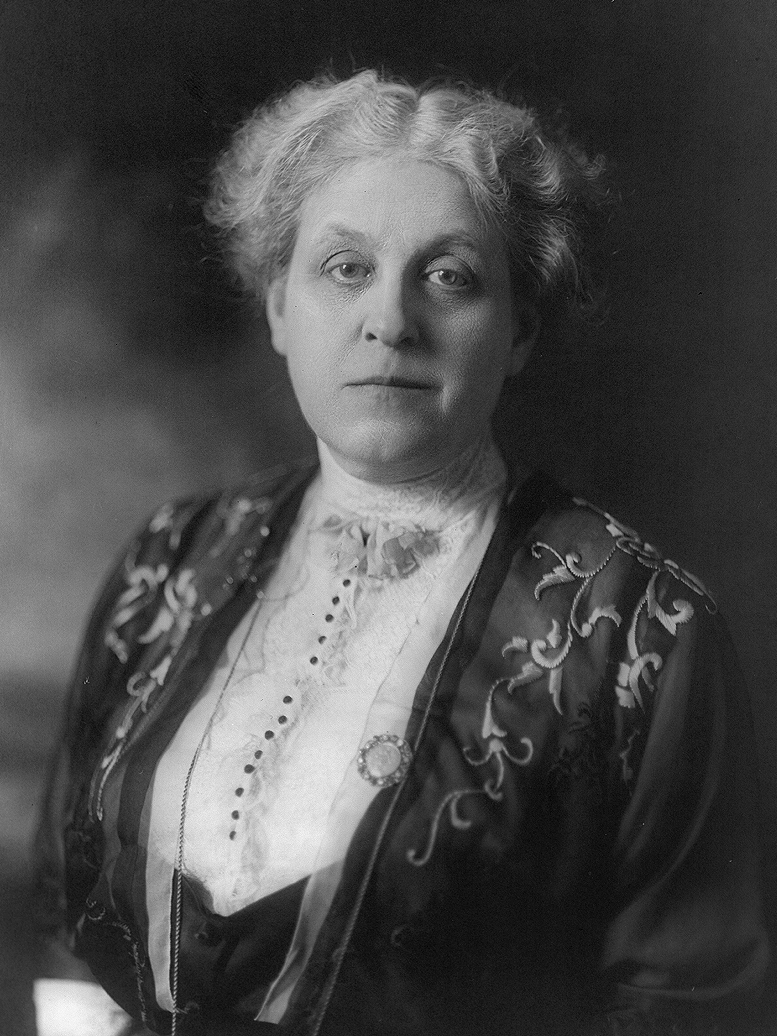
Carrie Chapman Catt

- March 2 – Whately Carington, British parapsychologist (b. 1892)
- March 5 – Alfredo Casella, Italian composer (b. 1883)
- March 9
  - Carrie Chapman Catt, American suffrage leader (b. 1859)
  - Jhaverchand Meghani, Indian poet, writer (b. 1897)
  - Evripidis Bakirtzis, Hellenic Army officer and Greek politician (b. 1895)
- March 11
  - Victor Lustig, Austrian-born con artist (b. 1890)
  - Wilhelm Heye, German general (b. 1869)
- March 12 – Walter Samuel Goodland, Governor of Wisconsin (b. 1862)
- March 15
  - Jean-Richard Bloch, French critic, novelist and playwright (b. 1884)
- March 17 – Taixu, Chinese Buddhist activist (b. 1890)
- March 18 – William C. Durant, American automobile pioneer (b. 1861)
- March 19
  - James A. Gilmore, American businessman and baseball executive (b. 1887)
  - Prudence Heward, Canadian painter (b. 1896)
- March 20 – Victor Goldschmidt, Swiss geochemist (b. 1888)
- March 21 – Homer Lusk Collyer, American hermit brother (Collyer brothers) (b. 1881)
- March 23
  - Archduchess Louise of Austria, Princess of Tuscany (b. 1870)
  - Ferdinand Zecca, French actor, producer, director and screenwriter (b. 1864)
- March 25 – Chen Cheng-po, Taiwanese painter (b. 1895)
- March 28
  - Johnny Evers, American baseball player (Chicago Cubs), MLB Hall of Fame member (b. 1881)
  - Karol Świerczewski, Polish military leader (b. 1897)
- March 29 – Manuel de Adalid y Gamero, Honduran composer (b. 1872)

=== April ===
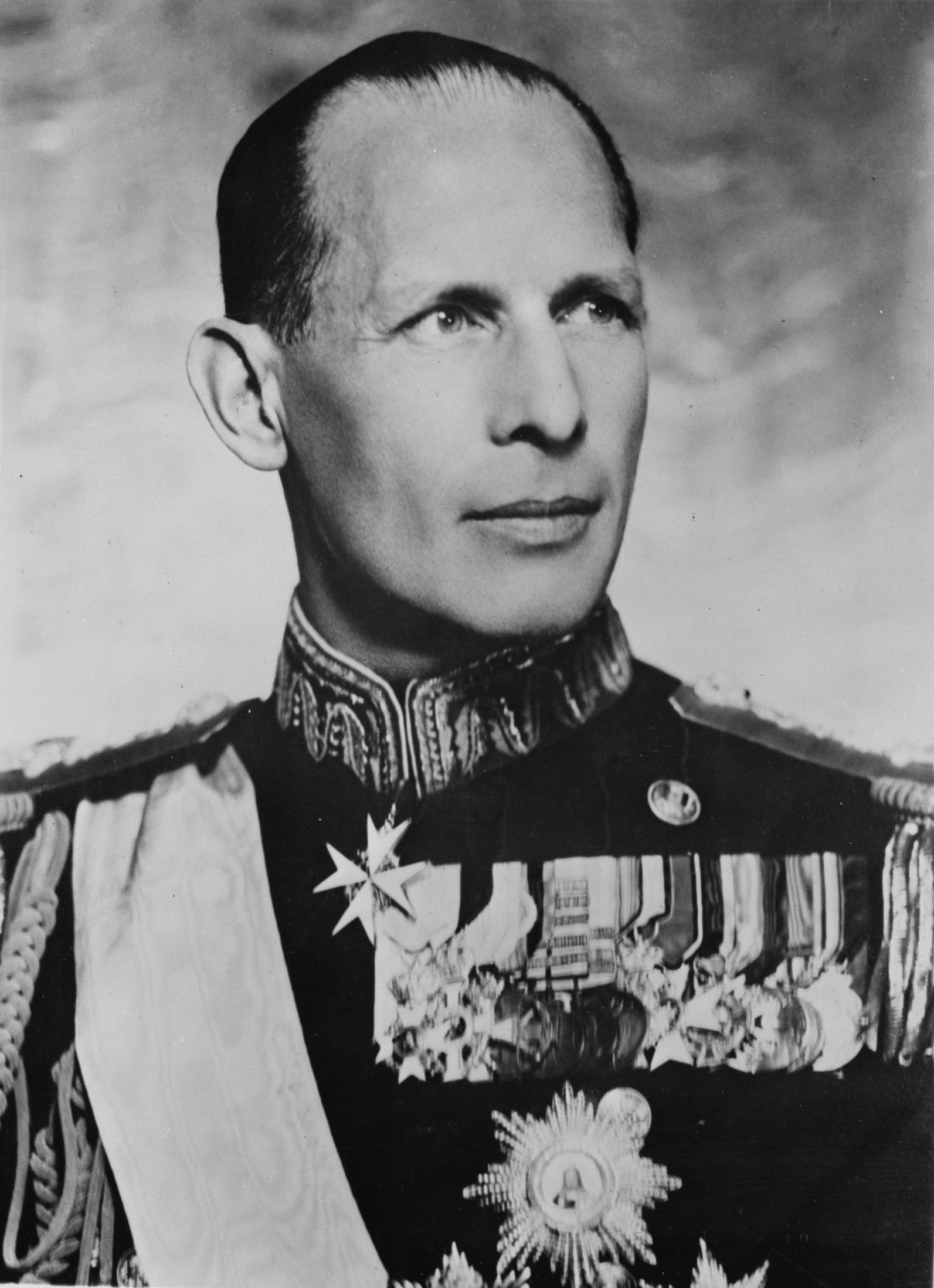
King George II of Greece

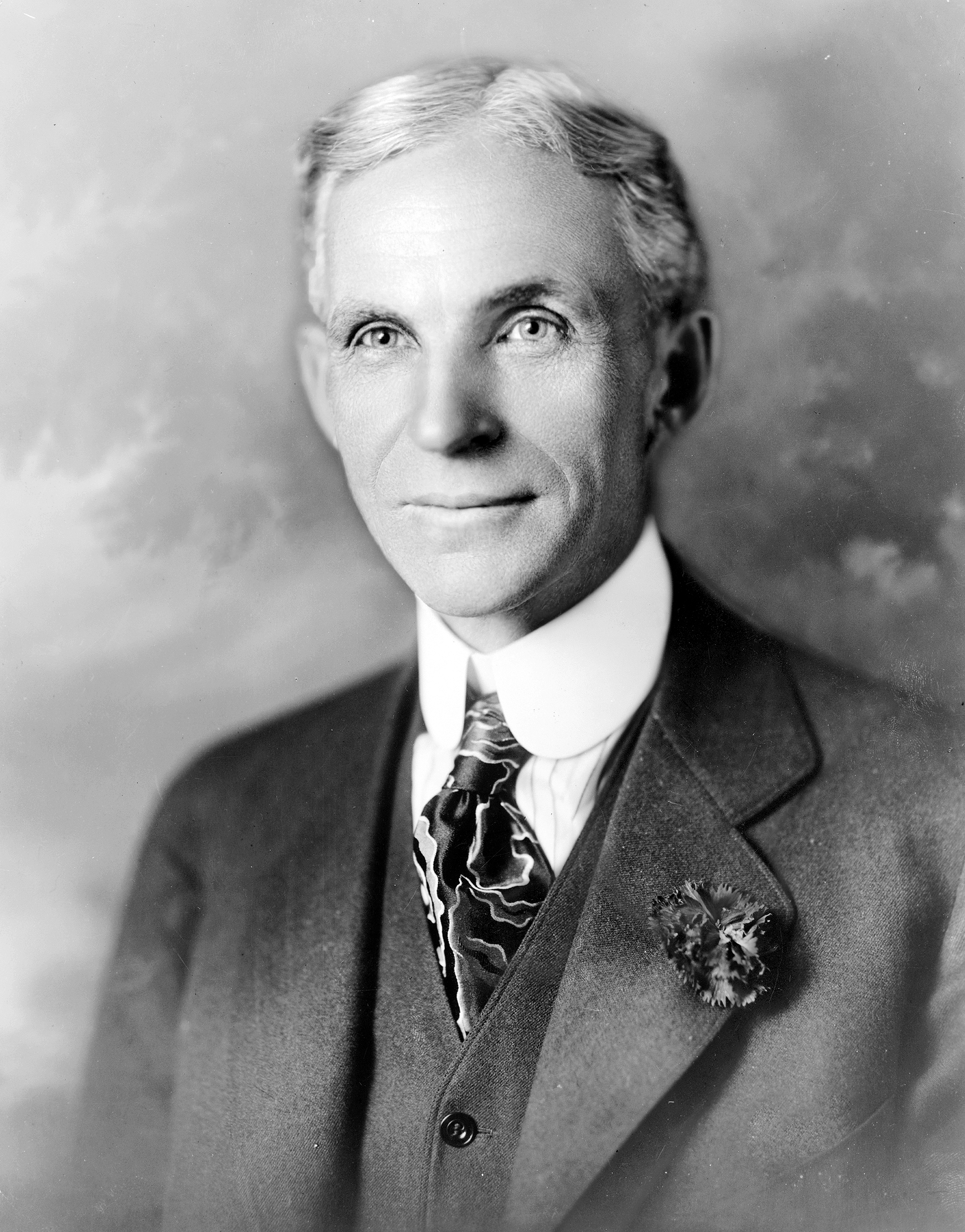
Henry Ford

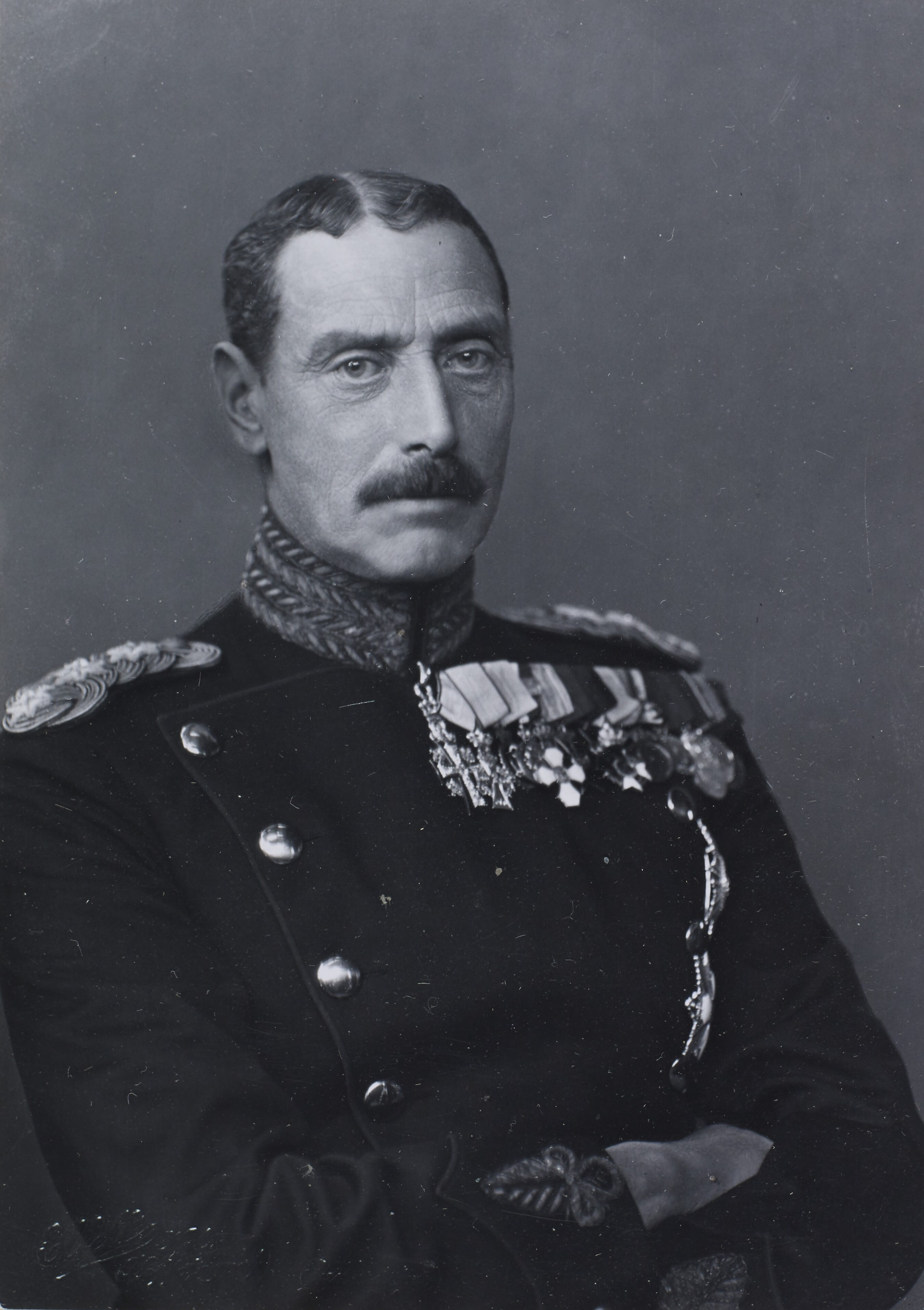
King Christian X of Denmark

Gheorghe Ciuhandu

- April 1 – King George II of Greece (b. 1890)
- April 5 – Petro Trad, Lebanese lawyer, politician, 14th Prime Minister of Lebanon and 5th President of Lebanon (b. 1876)
- April 7
  - Henry Ford, American industrialist, automobile manufacturer (b. 1863)
  - Savvas the New of Kalymnos, Greek Orthodox priest and saint (b. 1862)
- April 8 – Langley Collyer, American hermit brother (b. 1885)
- April 9 – William Foden, American composer (b. 1860)
- April 10
  - Charles Bally, Swiss linguist (b. 1865)
  - John Ince, American actor (b. 1878)
- April 12 – Duke Robert of Württemberg (b. 1873)
- April 14 – Ayoub Tabet, 6th Prime Minister of Lebanon (b. 1884)
- April 15 – Georg Friederici, German ethnologist (b. 1866)
- April 16
  - Guido Donegani, Italian engineer, businessman and politician (b. 1877)
  - Rudolf Höss, German commandant of Auschwitz concentration camp (executed) (b. 1900)
- April 17 – Izso Glickstein, American musician (b. 1889)
- April 18 – Jozef Tiso, Slovak politician, Roman Catholic priest, 1st Prime Minister of Slovakia and President of Slovakia (executed) (b. 1887)
- April 20
  - King Christian X of Denmark (b. 1870)
  - Louis R. de Steiguer, American admiral (b. 1867)
- April 21 – Heitor da Silva Costa, Brazilian engineer, designer and constructor (b. 1873)
- April 23 – Gyula Károlyi, Hungarian politician, 29th Prime Minister of Hungary (b. 1871)
- April 24 – Willa Cather, American novelist (b. 1873)
- April 25
  - José María Reina Andrade, acting president of Guatemala (b. 1860)
  - Ana Cumpănaș, Austro-Hungarian prostitute (b. 1889)
- April 26 – Francesco Paolo Finocchiaro, Italian painter (b. 1868)
- April 29
  - Gheorghie Ciuhandu, Romanian Orthodox priest, theologian, historian and advocate (b. 1875)
  - Irving Fisher, American economist (b. 1867)
- April 30
  - Francesc Cambó, Andorran politician (b. 1876)
  - Sir Almroth Wright, British bacteriologist and immunologist (b. 1861)

=== May ===
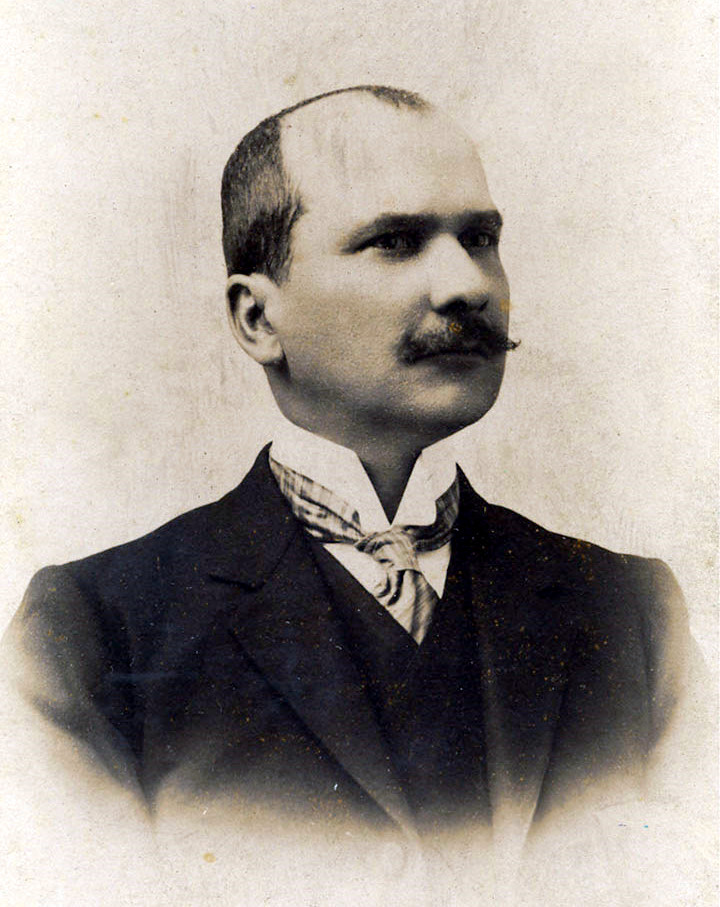
Miguel Abadía Méndez

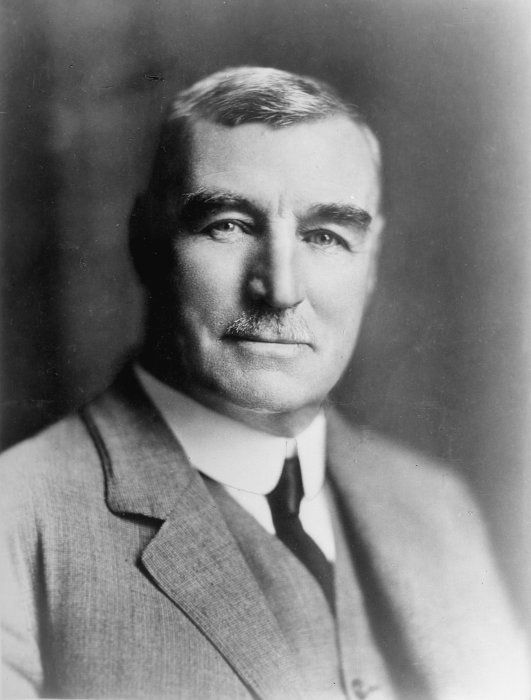
George William Forbes

- May 8 – Harry Gordon Selfridge, American department store magnate (b. 1858)
- May 11 – Frederic Goudy, American printer, artist and type designer (b. 1865)
- May 13 – Sukanta Bhattacharya, Bengali poet (b. 1926)
- May 15 – Miguel Abadía Méndez, Colombian politician, 12th President of Colombia (b. 1867)
- May 16
  - Sir Frederick Gowland Hopkins, British biochemist, recipient of the Nobel Prize in Physiology or Medicine (b. 1861)
  - Kalle Hakala, Finnish politician (b. 1880)
  - Michael Joseph Curley, American Roman Catholic bishop and reverend (b. 1879)
  - Zhang Lingfu, Chinese general of the National Revolutionary Army (b. 1903)
- May 17
  - George Forbes, 22nd Prime Minister of New Zealand (b. 1869)
  - Seabiscuit, thoroughbred racehorse (b. 1933)
- May 18 – Lucile Gleason, American actress (b. 1888)
- May 20 – Philipp Lenard, Austrian physicist, Nobel Prize laureate (b. 1862)
- May 23 – Charles-Ferdinand Ramuz, Swiss writer (b. 1878)
- May 28 – August Eigruber, Nazi war criminal (executed) (b. 1907)
- May 30 – Georg Ludwig von Trapp, Austrian sailor, patriarch of the Von Trapp Family of The Sound of Music fame (b. 1880)
- May 31 – Adrienne Ames, American actress (b. 1907)

=== June ===
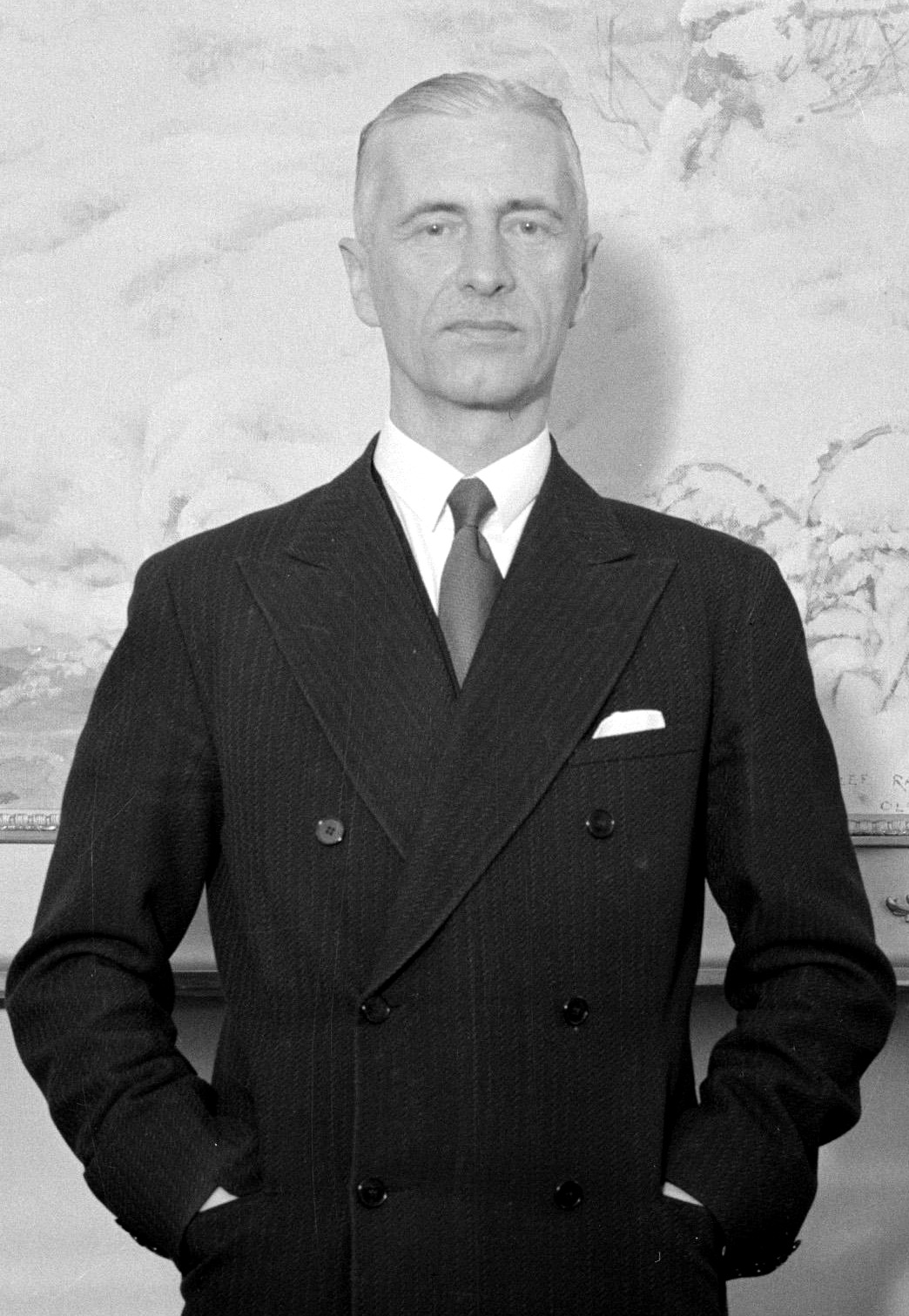
Władysław Raczkiewicz

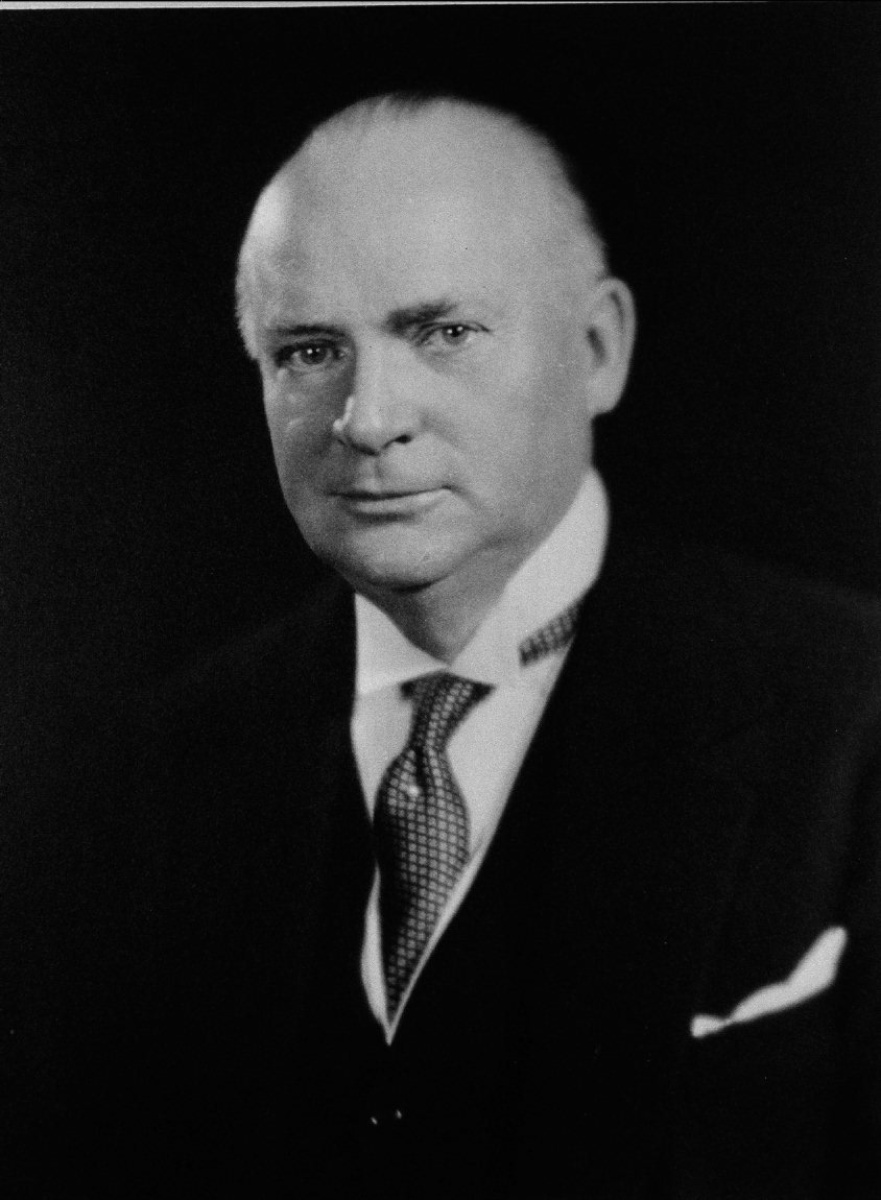
Richard Bedford Bennett

- June 6
  - S. H. Dudley, American urban singer (b. 1864)
  - Władysław Raczkiewicz, Polish politician, lawyer, diplomat and 5th President of Poland (b. 1885)
  - José Marques da Silva, Portuguese architect (b. 1869)
- June 9
  - Augusto Giacometti, Italian painter (b. 1877)
  - J. Warren Kerrigan, American actor (b. 1879)
- June 11 – Richard Hönigswald, Hungarian-born American philosopher (b. 1875)
- June 14 – Albert Marquet, French painter (b. 1875)
- June 17 – Maxwell Perkins, American literary editor (b. 1884)
- June 18
  - Alfred Allen, American actor (b. 1866)
  - Richard Cooper, British actor (b. 1893)
  - Shigematsu Sakaibara, Japanese rear admiral, convicted war criminal (executed) (b. 1898)
  - John Henry Patteron, Anglo-Irish soldier, hunter and author (b. 1867)
- June 19 – Kōsō Abe, Japanese admiral, convicted war criminal (executed) (b. 1892)
- June 20 – Bugsy Siegel, American gangster (assassinated) (b. 1906)
- June 24 – Bartolome Pagano, Italian actor (b. 1878)
- June 26 – R. B. Bennett, 11th Prime Minister of Canada (b. 1870)
- June 28 – Franciszek Mączyński, Polish architect (b. 1874)

=== July ===
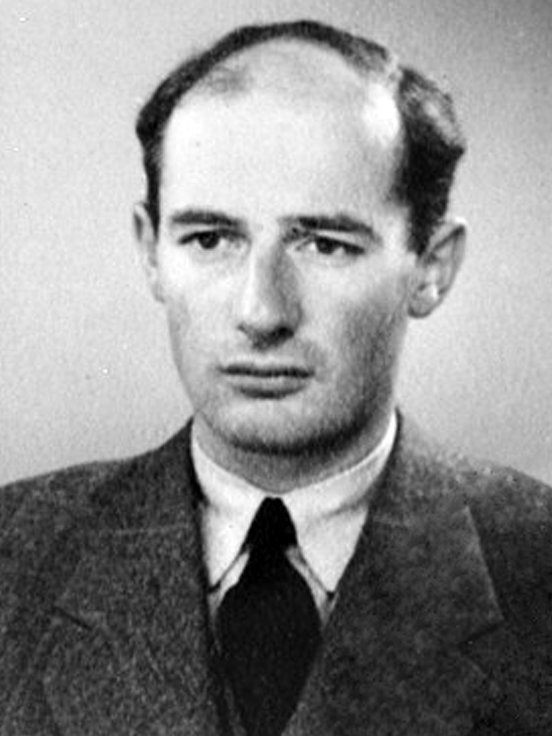
Raoul Wallenberg

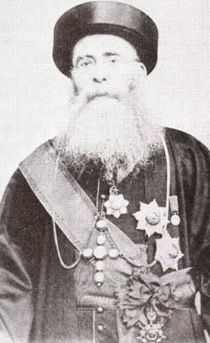
Patriarch Yousef VI Emmanuel II Thomas

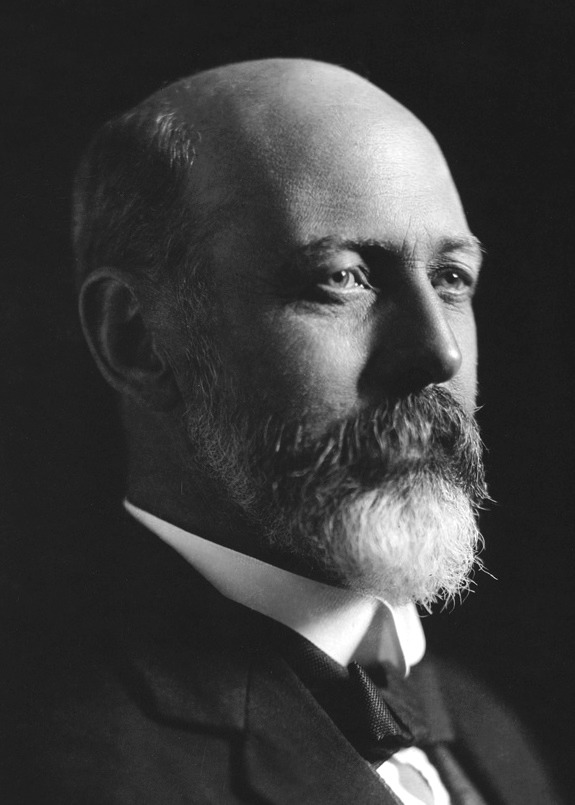
Joseph Cook

- July 7 – José Luis Tamayo, 20th President of Ecuador (b. 1858)
- July 12 – Jimmie Lunceford, American jazz musician (b. 1902)
- July 13 – George Francis Davis, New Zealand born Australian industrialist (b. 1883)
- July 15
  - Brandon Hurst, American stage, screen veteran (b. 1866)
  - Henry Kolker, American actor (b. 1874)
- July 17
  - Raoul Wallenberg, Swedish diplomat, humanitarian (presumed dead on this date) (b. 1912)
  - Prince Sisowath Youtevong, 4th Prime Minister of Cambodia (b. 1913)
- July 18 – Fumio Hayashi, Japanese physician (b. 1900)
- July 19 – Aung San, Burmese nationalist (assassinated) (b. 1915)
- July 21 – Patriarch Yousef VI Emmanuel II Thomas (b. 1852)
- July 23
  - Alice Fischer, American actress (b. 1869)
  - Ángel Roffo, Argentine doctor (b. 1882)
- July 26 – Archbishop Leontios of Cyprus (b. 1896)
- July 29
  - Leo Stein, American art collector, critic (b. 1872)
  - George Bausewine, American baseball player, umpire (b. 1869)
- July 30
  - Sir Joseph Cook, 6th Prime Minister of Australia (b. 1860)
  - Fedir Krychevsky, Ukrainian painter (b. 1879)

=== August ===
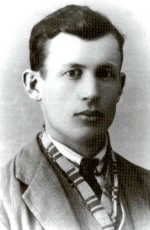
Blessed Claudio Granzotto

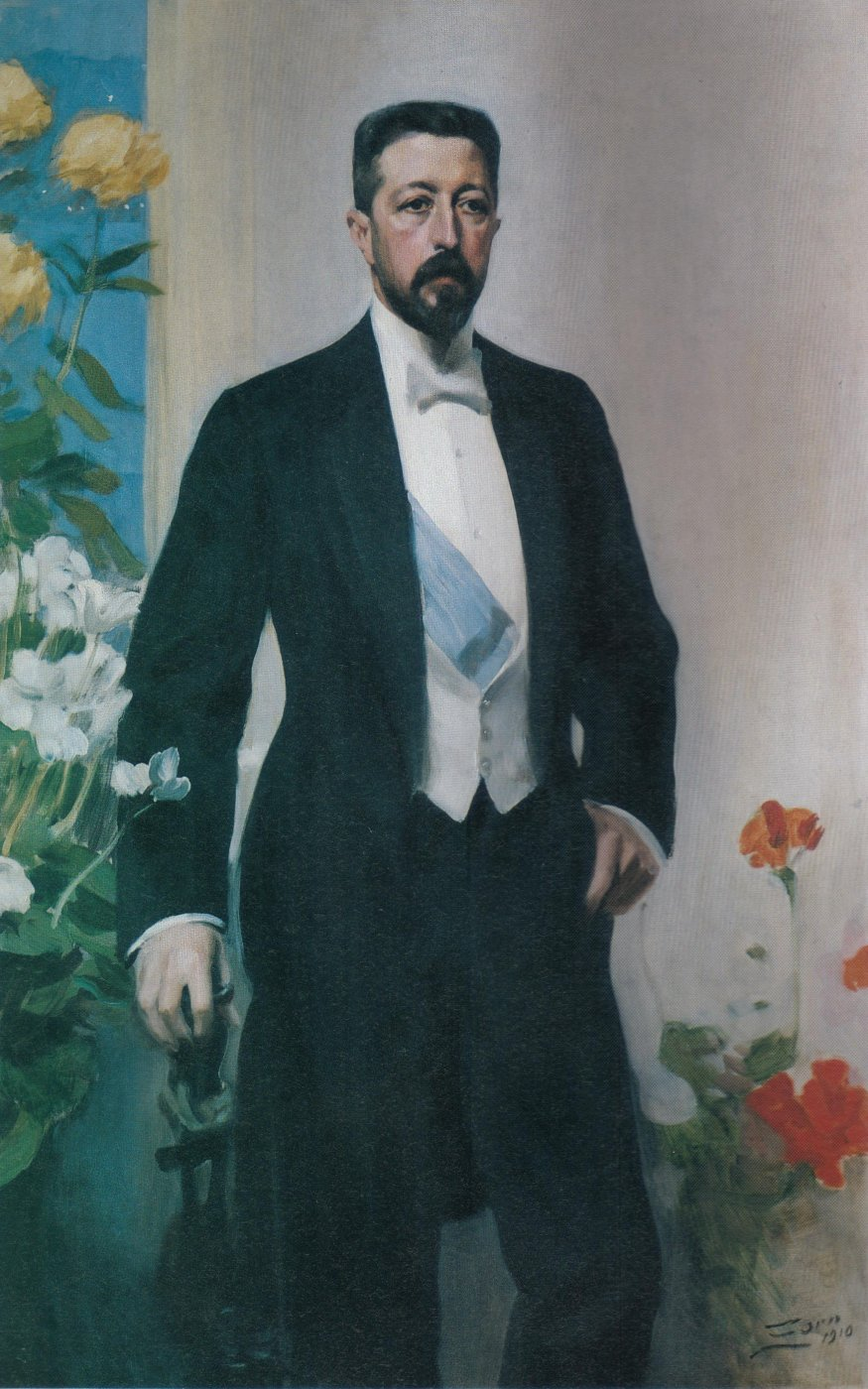
Prince Eugen, Duke of Närke

- August – Teresa Magbanua, Filipino general (b. 1868)
- August 3
  - José Pardo y Barreda, Peruvian politician, 51st Prime Minister of Peru and 2-time President of Peru (b. 1864)
  - Vic Willis, American baseball player (Boston Braves), MLB Hall of Fame member (b. 1876)
- August 7 – Anton Denikin, Russian military leader (b. 1872)
- August 9 – Carlo Romanelli, Italian sculptor (b. 1872)
- August 10 – Antonio Sciortino, Maltese sculptor (b. 1879)
- August 15 – Claudio Granzotto, Italian Roman Catholic religious professed and blessed (b. 1900)
- August 17 – Prince Eugen, Duke of Närke (b. 1865)
- August 21 – Ettore Bugatti, Italian car designer, founder of Bugatti (b. 1881)
- August 23 – Hasmik, Soviet actress (b. 1878)
- August 29
  - Manolete, Spanish bullfighter (gored) (b. 1917)
  - Kōtarō Nakamura, Imperial Japanese Army general (b. 1881)

=== September ===
- September 1 – Frederick Russell Burnham, American Scout, father of the international Scouting movement (b. 1861)
- September 8 – Victor Horta, Belgian Art Nouveau architect (b. 1861)
- September 9
  - Ananda Coomaraswamy, Ceylonese-born American philosopher (b. 1877)
  - Mary Willie Arvin, American nurse (b. 1879)
- September 10 – Hatazō Adachi, Japanese general (suicide) (b. 1890)
- September 11
  - Robert Lee Bullard, American general (b. 1861)
  - Alice Keppel, mistress of Edward VII (b. 1868)
- September 20
  - Fiorello La Guardia, Mayor of New York (b. 1882)
  - Jantina Tammes, Dutch plant biologist (b. 1871)
- September 21
  - Harry Carey, American film actor (b. 1878)
  - Vasily Glagolev, Soviet general (b. 1896)
- September 26 – Hugh Lofting, British-born writer (b. 1886)
- September 27 – Luigi Barlassina, Patriarch of Jerusalem (b. 1872)

=== October ===
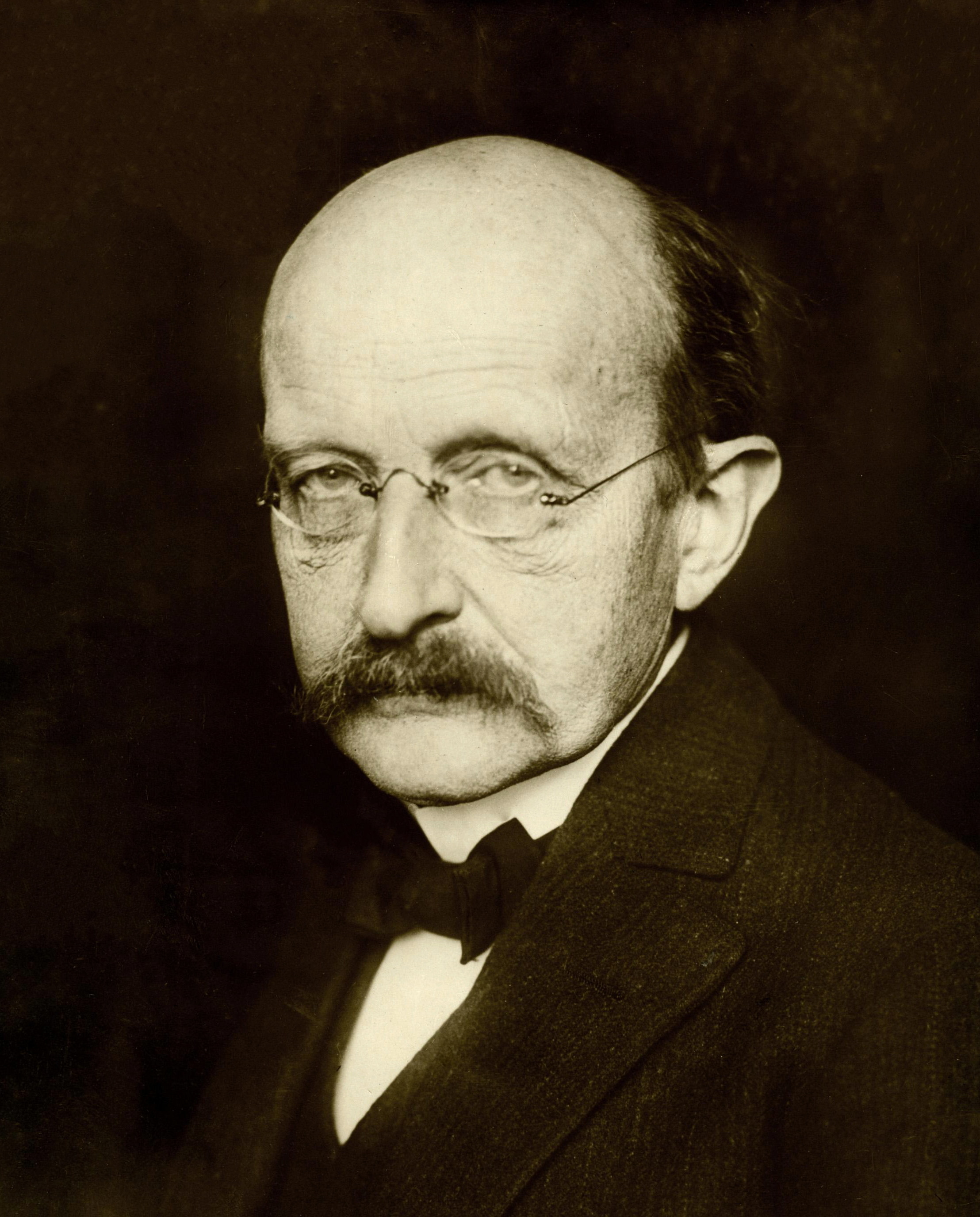
Max Planck

- October 1
  - Olive Borden, American actress (b. 1907)
  - Gregorio Martinez Sierra, Spanish writer, poet, dramatist and director (b. 1881)
- October 2 – P. D. Ouspensky, Soviet mathematician (b. 1878)
- October 3
  - Ernest L. Riebau, American politician (b. 1895)
  - Traian Brăileanu, Austro-Hungarian-born Romanian sociologist and politician (b. 1882)
- October 4 – Max Planck, German physicist, Nobel Prize laureate (b. 1858)
- October 6 – Leevi Madetoja, Finnish composer (b. 1887)
- October 7 – Arshak Fetvadjian, Armenian artist, painter and designer (b. 1866)
- October 10 – Jo Mora, Uruguayan-born American cartoonist (b. 1876)
- October 12
  - James Farley, American actor (b. 1882)
  - Sir Ian Hamilton, British general (b. 1853)
- October 13 – Sidney Webb, 1st Baron Passfield, British economist, social reformer (b. 1859)
- October 15 – Osmond Brock, British Royal Navy officer (b. 1869)
- October 16 – Anna B. Eckstein, German peace campaigner (b. 1868)
- October 17 – John Halliday, American actor (b. 1880)
- October 18
  - Harry C. Bradley, American actor (b. 1869)
  - Massimo Terzano, Italian cinematographer (b. 1892)
  - Gay Gibson, British actress and murder victim (b. 1926)
- October 20 – Sir Albert Howard, English botanist and organic farming pioneer (b. 1873)
- October 23
  - Carl Shelton, American gangster (b. 1888)
  - Martin Fiebig, German Luftwaffe general convicted of war crimes (executed) (b. 1891)
- October 24 – Dudley Digges, Irish actor (b. 1879)
- October 27 – María Teresalina Sánchez, Spanish Franciscan religious sister, missionary and martyr (b. 1918)
- October 29 – Frances Cleveland, First Lady of the United States (b. 1864)
- October 30 – John Joseph Cantwell, Irish-born American prelate of the Catholic Church (b. 1874)

=== November ===
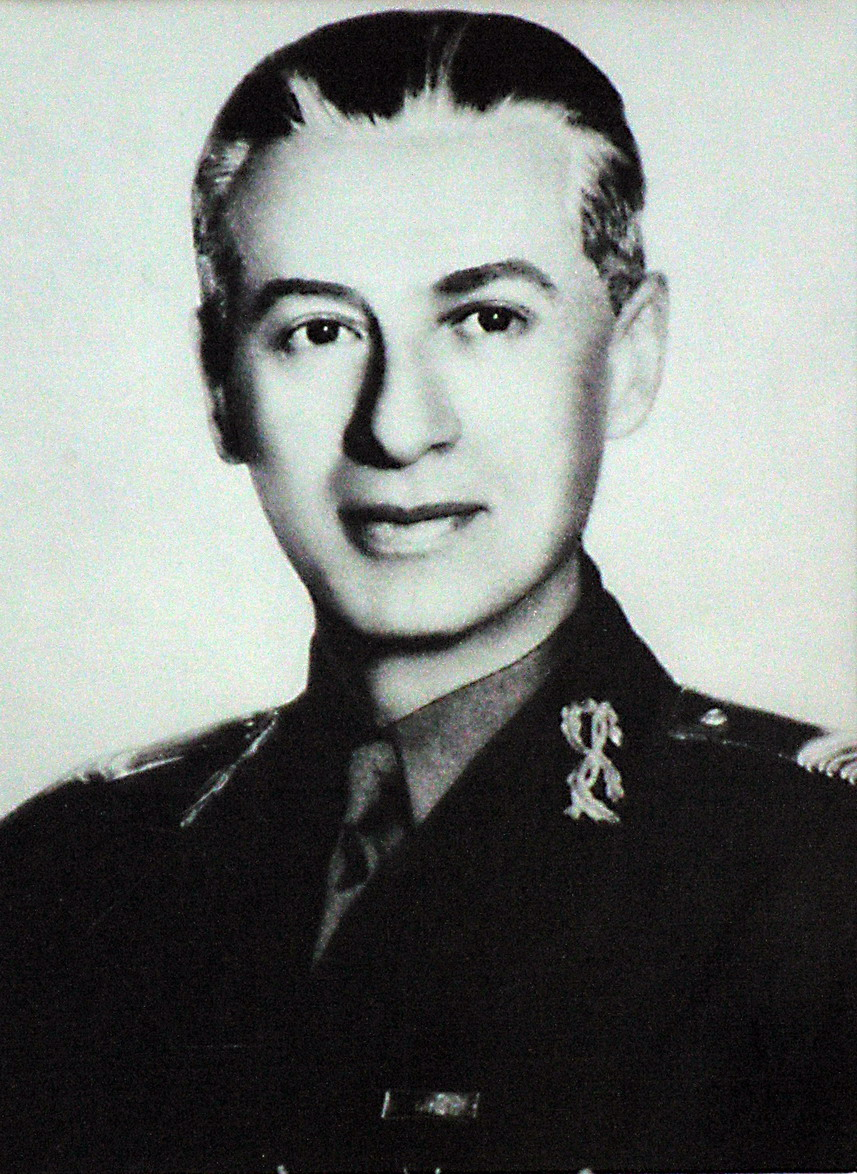
Constantin Sănătescu

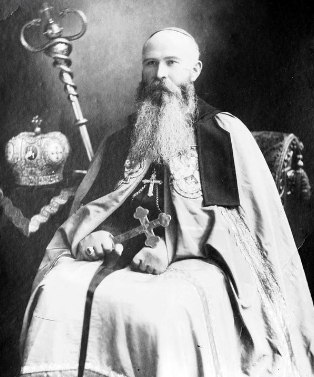
Blessed Josaphat Kotsylovsky

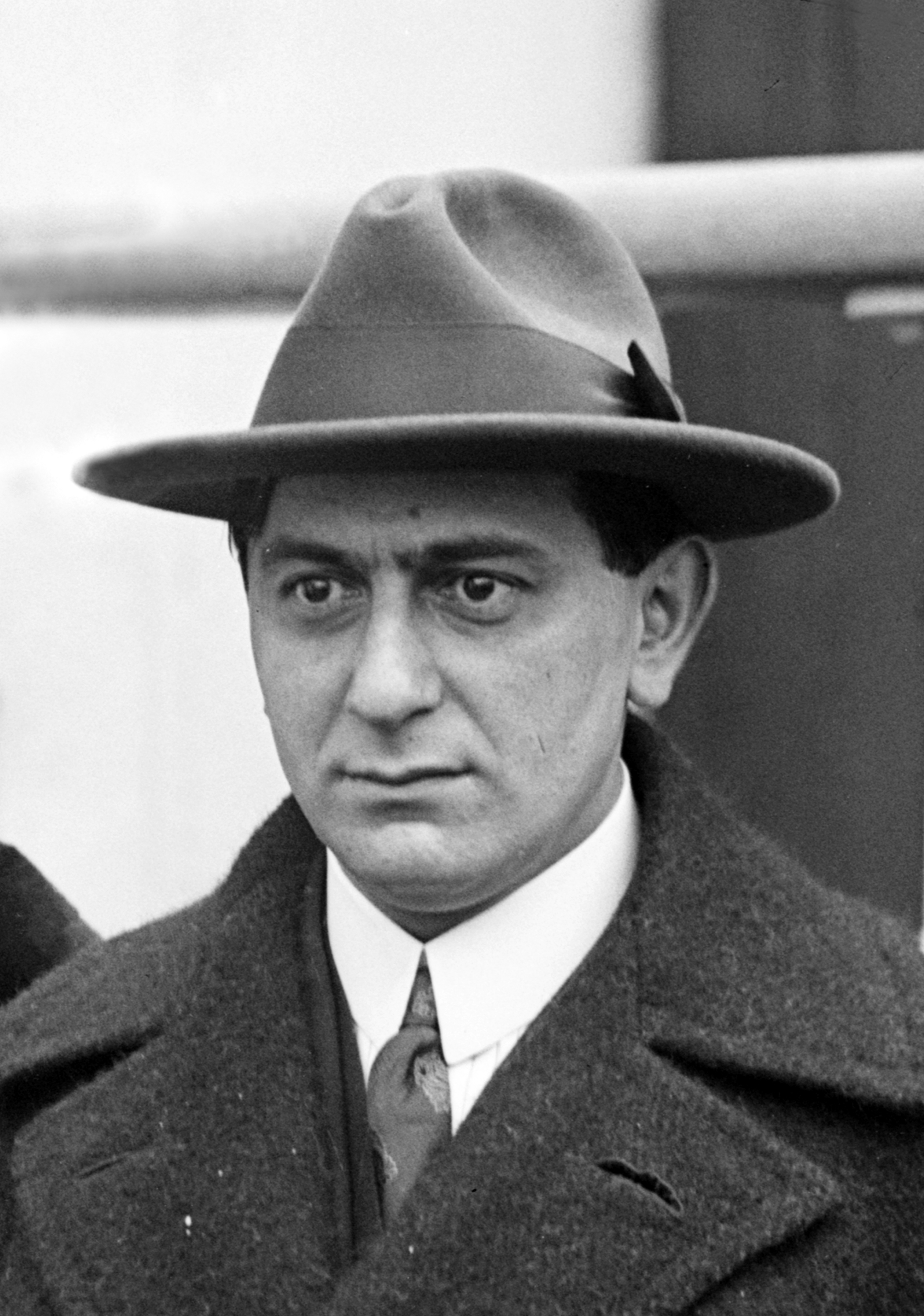
Ernst Lubitsch

- November 1 – Óscar Castro Zúñiga, Chilean writer and poet (b. 1910)
- November 3
  - John Gilbert Winant, American diplomat and politician (b. 1889)
  - A. C. Cuza, Romanian politician and economist (b. 1857)
- November 7
  - Sándor Garbai, Prime Minister of Hungary (b. 1879)
  - William Ernest Cooke, Australian astronomer (b. 1863)
- November 8
  - Mariano Benlliure, Spanish sculptor (b. 1862)
  - Constantin Sănătescu, Romanian general, statesman and 44th Prime Minister of Romania (b. 1885)
- November 10
  - Louis Collard, Belgian fascist politician and Nazi collaborator (executed) (b. 1915)
  - Victor Matthys, Belgian fascist politician and Nazi collaborator (executed) (b. 1914)
- November 14 – Verena Conzett, Swiss magazine publisher and labor and women's rights activist (b. 1861)
- November 15 – Eduard Ritter von Schleich, German fighter ace, air force general (b. 1888)
- November 16 – Giuseppe Volpi, Italian businessman, politician (b. 1877)
- November 17 – Josaphat Kotsylovsky, Ukrainian Roman Catholic bishop, martyr and blessed (b. 1876)
- November 20
  - Georg Kolbe, German sculptor (b. 1877)
  - Wolfgang Borchert, German author and playwright (b. 1921)
- November 26 – Ernie Adams, American actor (b. 1885)
- November 28
  - W. E. Lawrence, American actor (b. 1896)
  - Philippe Leclerc de Hauteclocque, French general (b. 1902)
- November 30 – Ernst Lubitsch, German film director (b. 1892)

=== December ===
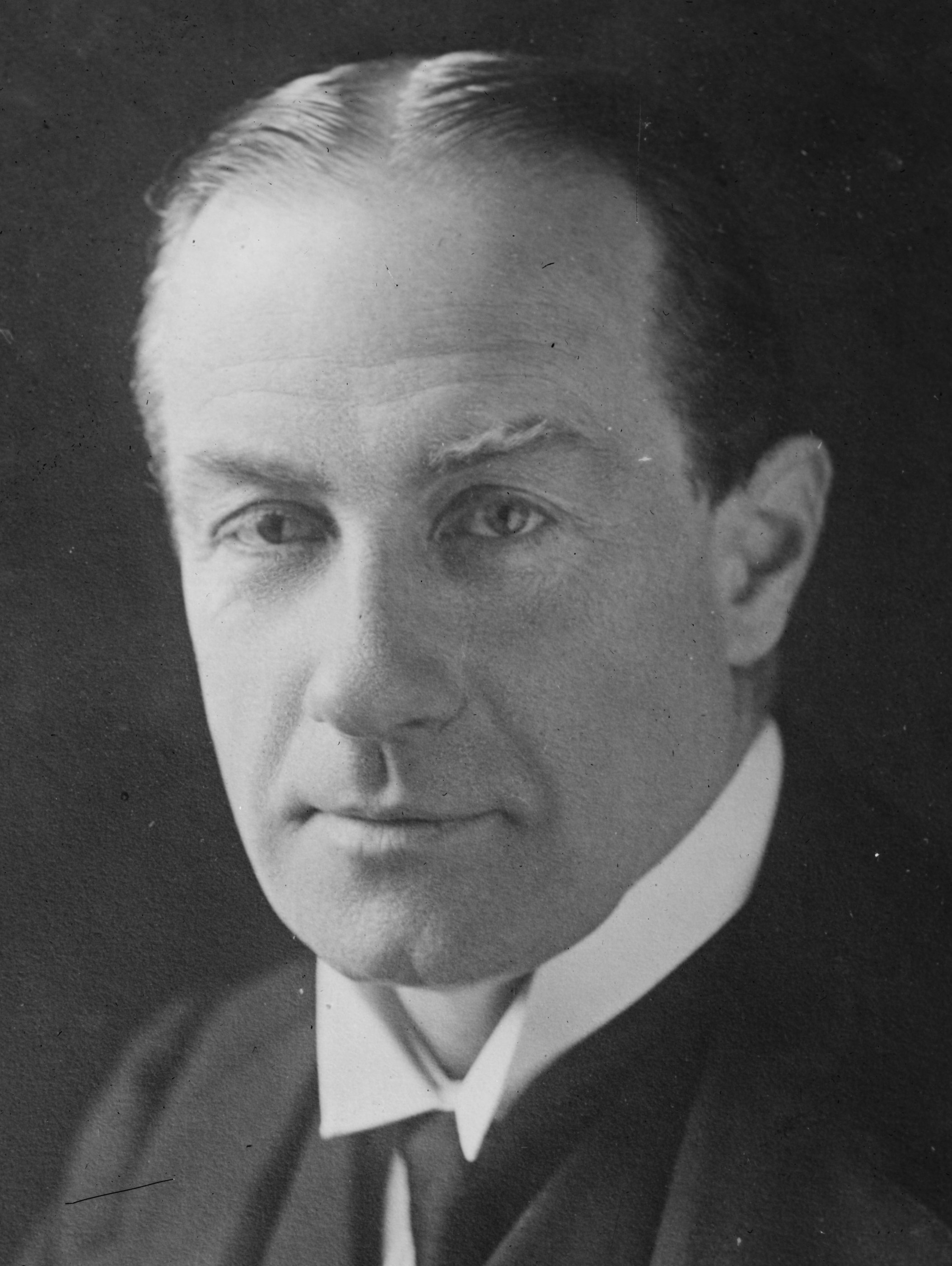
Stanley Baldwin

King Victor Emmanuel III of Italy

- December 1
  - Aleister Crowley, British occultist (b. 1875)
  - G. H. Hardy, British mathematician (b. 1877)
  - Sir John Fraser, 1st Baronet, of Tain, British surgeon and professor (b. 1885)
- December 2 – Franz Xaver Schwarz, German Nazi politician (executed) (b. 1875)
- December 3 – Heinrich Hetsch, German physician, microbiologist (b. 1873)
- December 4
  - Margaret Butler, New Zealand sculptor (b. 1883)
  - Walter Walker, American actor (b. 1864)
- December 6 – Tadashige Daigo, Japanese admiral (executed) (b. 1891)
- December 7
  - Tristan Bernard, French writer, lawyer (b. 1866)
  - Nicholas Murray Butler, American president of Columbia University, Nobel Peace Prize recipient (b. 1862)
  - Henry Page Croft, 1st Baron Croft, British politician (b. 1881)
- December 9 – John Kelly, American actor (b. 1901)
- December 10 – Pierre Petit de Julleville, French Roman Catholic priest, bishop and eminence (b. 1876)
- December 12 – Huda Sha'arawi, Egyptian feminist (b. 1879)
- December 13
  - Nicholas Roerich, Russian painter (b. 1874)
  - Juan Bautista Vargas Arreola, Mexican general during Mexican Revolution (b. 1890)
- December 14
  - Stanley Baldwin, British Conservative politician, 3-time Prime Minister of the United Kingdom (b. 1867)
  - Edward Higgins, General of The Salvation Army (b. 1864)
- December 15 – Arthur Machen, British writer (b. 1863)
- December 16 – Walter Dew, British Metropolitan Police officer (b. 1863)
- December 17
  - Johannes Nicolaus Brønsted, Danish chemist (b. 1879)
  - Christos Tsigiridis, Greek engineer (b. 1877)
  - Bernard Spilsbury, British pathologist (b. 1877)
- December 20
  - Benigno Aquino Sr., Filipino politician (b. 1894)
  - Luigi Chiarelli, Italian playwright (b. 1880)
- December 23 – Ziauddin Ahmad, Indian educationalist and politician (b. 1878)
- December 25 – Gaspar G. Bacon, Lieutenant Governor of Massachusetts (b. 1886)
- December 27 – Johannes Winkler, German rocket pioneer (b. 1897)
- December 28 – King Victor Emmanuel III of Italy (b. 1869)
- December 30
  - Han van Meegeren, Dutch painter, forger (b. 1889)
  - Alfred North Whitehead, British mathematician, philosopher (b. 1861)
- December 31 – Louise Beaudet, Canadian actress, singer and dancer (b. 1859)

=== Date unknown ===
- Ayoub Tabet, 6th Prime Minister of Lebanon (b. 1884)
- Mariette Leslie Cotton, American artist (b. 1866)
- Gustaf Erikson, Finnish shipowner (b. 1872)
- Mari Gerekmezyan, one of Turkey's first female sculptors and the first female Armenian sculptor (b. 1913)

== Nobel Prizes ==
Nobel medal awarded to Edward Victor Appleton

- Physics – Edward Victor Appleton
- Chemistry – Sir Robert Robinson
- Medicine – Carl Ferdinand Cori, Gerty Cori, Bernardo Houssay
- Literature – André Gide
- Peace – The Friends Service Council (UK) and The American Friends Service Committee (USA), on behalf of the Religious Society of Friends
