= List of minor planets: 661001–662000 =

The following is a partial list of minor planets, running from minor-planet number 661001 through 662000, inclusive. The primary data for this and other partial lists is based on JPL's "Small-Body Orbital Elements" and data available from the Minor Planet Center. Critical list information is also provided by the MPC, unless otherwise specified from Lowell Observatory. A detailed description of the table's columns and additional sources are given on the main page including a complete list of every page in this series, and a statistical break-up on the dynamical classification of minor planets.

Also see the summary list of all named bodies in numerical and alphabetical order, and the corresponding naming citations for the number range of this particular list. New namings may only be added to this list after official publication, as the preannouncement of names is condemned by the Working Group for Small Bodies Nomenclature of the International Astronomical Union.

Near-Earth obj.	MBA (inner)	MBA (outer)	Centaur
Mars-crosser	MBA (middle)	Jupiter trojan	Trans-Neptunian obj.
Unclassified

== 661001–661100 ==
Designation			Discovery			Properties		Ref
Permanent	Provisional	Named after	Date	Site	Discoverer(s)	Category	Diam.	Ref
661001	2003 SD_{392}	—	September 26, 2003	Apache Point	SDSS Collaboration	·	1.3 km	MPC · JPL
661002	2003 SL_{392}	—	September 28, 2003	Anderson Mesa	LONEOS	·	1.5 km	MPC · JPL
661003	2003 SM_{396}	—	December 8, 1996	Kitt Peak	Spacewatch	V	480 m	MPC · JPL
661004	2003 SM_{398}	—	September 26, 2003	Apache Point	SDSS Collaboration	·	1.7 km	MPC · JPL
661005	2003 SU_{398}	—	October 16, 2003	Palomar	NEAT	·	2.9 km	MPC · JPL
661006	2003 SV_{402}	—	September 27, 2003	Kitt Peak	Spacewatch	·	1.8 km	MPC · JPL
661007	2003 SE_{405}	—	September 27, 2003	Apache Point	SDSS Collaboration	·	2.7 km	MPC · JPL
661008	2003 SN_{405}	—	September 27, 2003	Apache Point	SDSS	·	2.7 km	MPC · JPL
661009	2003 SS_{413}	—	September 29, 2003	Kitt Peak	Spacewatch	EOS	1.6 km	MPC · JPL
661010	2003 SH_{416}	—	October 2, 2003	Kitt Peak	Spacewatch	V	520 m	MPC · JPL
661011	2003 SC_{419}	—	September 28, 2003	Apache Point	SDSS	EOS	2.2 km	MPC · JPL
661012	2003 SO_{421}	—	September 30, 2003	Kitt Peak	Spacewatch	·	3.0 km	MPC · JPL
661013	2003 SZ_{424}	—	February 2, 2005	Kitt Peak	Spacewatch	·	750 m	MPC · JPL
661014	2003 SX_{430}	—	September 26, 2003	Apache Point	SDSS Collaboration	·	1.1 km	MPC · JPL
661015	2003 SN_{434}	—	September 28, 2003	Haleakala	NEAT	·	1.9 km	MPC · JPL
661016	2003 SA_{435}	—	April 5, 2002	Palomar	NEAT	H	620 m	MPC · JPL
661017	2003 SH_{436}	—	November 2, 2007	Kitt Peak	Spacewatch	·	1.3 km	MPC · JPL
661018	2003 SP_{436}	—	August 19, 2006	Kitt Peak	Spacewatch	·	600 m	MPC · JPL
661019	2003 SK_{437}	—	September 29, 2003	Kitt Peak	Spacewatch	·	1.7 km	MPC · JPL
661020	2003 SY_{437}	—	November 2, 2008	Mount Lemmon	Mount Lemmon Survey	·	1.6 km	MPC · JPL
661021	2003 SS_{438}	—	July 30, 2017	Haleakala	Pan-STARRS 1	·	1.7 km	MPC · JPL
661022	2003 SA_{439}	—	September 30, 2003	Kitt Peak	Spacewatch	HOF	2.1 km	MPC · JPL
661023	2003 SQ_{439}	—	September 30, 2003	Kitt Peak	Spacewatch	HOF	2.1 km	MPC · JPL
661024	2003 SX_{439}	—	September 30, 2003	Kitt Peak	Spacewatch	·	1.5 km	MPC · JPL
661025	2003 SA_{440}	—	January 23, 2015	Haleakala	Pan-STARRS 1	·	1.5 km	MPC · JPL
661026	2003 SC_{440}	—	September 20, 2003	Kitt Peak	Spacewatch	·	970 m	MPC · JPL
661027	2003 SM_{442}	—	October 22, 2003	Kitt Peak	Deep Ecliptic Survey	NYS	1.0 km	MPC · JPL
661028	2003 SZ_{442}	—	February 5, 2011	Haleakala	Pan-STARRS 1	EOS	1.4 km	MPC · JPL
661029	2003 SK_{443}	—	June 8, 2016	Haleakala	Pan-STARRS 1	·	1.4 km	MPC · JPL
661030	2003 SZ_{443}	—	September 18, 2003	Kitt Peak	Spacewatch	HNS	800 m	MPC · JPL
661031	2003 SE_{444}	—	September 29, 2003	Kitt Peak	Spacewatch	NYS	940 m	MPC · JPL
661032	2003 SU_{444}	—	April 12, 2011	Mount Lemmon	Mount Lemmon Survey	·	1.5 km	MPC · JPL
661033	2003 SX_{444}	—	September 22, 2003	Kitt Peak	Spacewatch	·	620 m	MPC · JPL
661034	2003 SS_{445}	—	September 30, 2003	Kitt Peak	Spacewatch	·	420 m	MPC · JPL
661035	2003 SW_{445}	—	December 26, 2014	Haleakala	Pan-STARRS 1	T_{j} (2.97) · EUP	3.4 km	MPC · JPL
661036	2003 SV_{449}	—	September 30, 2003	Kitt Peak	Spacewatch	·	590 m	MPC · JPL
661037	2003 SE_{450}	—	September 29, 2003	Kitt Peak	Spacewatch	·	470 m	MPC · JPL
661038	2003 SF_{450}	—	December 18, 2007	Mount Lemmon	Mount Lemmon Survey	·	920 m	MPC · JPL
661039	2003 SK_{450}	—	November 1, 2008	Mount Lemmon	Mount Lemmon Survey	·	1.8 km	MPC · JPL
661040	2003 SQ_{450}	—	September 30, 2003	Apache Point	SDSS Collaboration	EOS	1.5 km	MPC · JPL
661041	2003 SK_{453}	—	February 8, 2008	Kitt Peak	Spacewatch	·	610 m	MPC · JPL
661042	2003 SD_{454}	—	March 28, 2012	Kitt Peak	Spacewatch	·	2.2 km	MPC · JPL
661043	2003 SW_{454}	—	August 15, 2017	Haleakala	Pan-STARRS 1	·	1.6 km	MPC · JPL
661044	2003 SJ_{456}	—	March 22, 2015	Haleakala	Pan-STARRS 1	H	350 m	MPC · JPL
661045	2003 ST_{456}	—	September 19, 2014	Haleakala	Pan-STARRS 1	·	820 m	MPC · JPL
661046	2003 SO_{457}	—	September 23, 2003	Palomar	NEAT	·	1.4 km	MPC · JPL
661047	2003 SQ_{462}	—	July 10, 2018	Haleakala	Pan-STARRS 2	·	890 m	MPC · JPL
661048	2003 SW_{462}	—	January 2, 2011	Mount Lemmon	Mount Lemmon Survey	·	2.3 km	MPC · JPL
661049	2003 SV_{470}	—	September 21, 2003	Palomar	NEAT	H	460 m	MPC · JPL
661050	2003 SN_{472}	—	September 19, 2003	Palomar	NEAT	·	920 m	MPC · JPL
661051	2003 SN_{474}	—	September 30, 2003	Kitt Peak	Spacewatch	·	930 m	MPC · JPL
661052	2003 SF_{476}	—	September 25, 2003	Palomar	NEAT	·	960 m	MPC · JPL
661053	2003 TR_{25}	—	October 1, 2003	Kitt Peak	Spacewatch	·	3.0 km	MPC · JPL
661054	2003 TX_{30}	—	October 2, 2000	Kitt Peak	Spacewatch	·	1.0 km	MPC · JPL
661055	2003 TU_{34}	—	October 1, 2003	Kitt Peak	Spacewatch	·	2.2 km	MPC · JPL
661056	2003 TN_{36}	—	October 1, 2003	Kitt Peak	Spacewatch	·	550 m	MPC · JPL
661057	2003 TA_{40}	—	September 21, 2003	Kitt Peak	Spacewatch	H	380 m	MPC · JPL
661058	2003 TA_{41}	—	October 2, 2003	Kitt Peak	Spacewatch	·	1.7 km	MPC · JPL
661059	2003 TM_{41}	—	October 2, 2003	Kitt Peak	Spacewatch	V	660 m	MPC · JPL
661060	2003 TQ_{45}	—	September 20, 2003	Palomar	NEAT	·	3.6 km	MPC · JPL
661061	2003 TH_{52}	—	October 5, 2003	Kitt Peak	Spacewatch	·	900 m	MPC · JPL
661062	2003 TY_{59}	—	October 2, 2003	Kitt Peak	Spacewatch	·	1.8 km	MPC · JPL
661063	2003 TA_{60}	—	October 2, 2003	Kitt Peak	Spacewatch	AGN	1.3 km	MPC · JPL
661064	2003 TJ_{60}	—	October 3, 2003	Kitt Peak	Spacewatch	·	3.2 km	MPC · JPL
661065	2003 TK_{60}	—	November 8, 2009	Mount Lemmon	Mount Lemmon Survey	(8737)	2.8 km	MPC · JPL
661066	2003 TR_{60}	—	September 6, 2008	Mount Lemmon	Mount Lemmon Survey	EOS	1.7 km	MPC · JPL
661067	2003 TG_{61}	—	October 3, 2003	Kitt Peak	Spacewatch	·	1.7 km	MPC · JPL
661068	2003 TB_{63}	—	April 23, 2015	Haleakala	Pan-STARRS 2	·	550 m	MPC · JPL
661069	2003 TS_{63}	—	March 16, 2012	Mount Lemmon	Mount Lemmon Survey	·	2.1 km	MPC · JPL
661070	2003 TV_{63}	—	December 1, 2008	Mount Lemmon	Mount Lemmon Survey	·	1.6 km	MPC · JPL
661071	2003 TZ_{64}	—	October 5, 2003	Kitt Peak	Spacewatch	·	750 m	MPC · JPL
661072	2003 UD_{1}	—	September 21, 2003	Palomar	NEAT	·	730 m	MPC · JPL
661073	2003 UF_{1}	—	October 16, 2003	Palomar	NEAT	·	870 m	MPC · JPL
661074	2003 UU_{10}	—	October 20, 2003	Socorro	LINEAR	·	630 m	MPC · JPL
661075	2003 UC_{18}	—	September 22, 2003	Kitt Peak	Spacewatch	NYS	750 m	MPC · JPL
661076	2003 UE_{28}	—	October 17, 2003	Kitt Peak	Spacewatch	·	730 m	MPC · JPL
661077	2003 UB_{45}	—	October 18, 2003	Kitt Peak	Spacewatch	·	2.7 km	MPC · JPL
661078	2003 UN_{46}	—	October 18, 2003	Kitt Peak	Spacewatch	KOR	900 m	MPC · JPL
661079	2003 UR_{56}	—	October 23, 2003	Anderson Mesa	LONEOS	·	3.0 km	MPC · JPL
661080	2003 UR_{70}	—	October 18, 2003	Kitt Peak	Spacewatch	·	1.3 km	MPC · JPL
661081	2003 UF_{89}	—	October 3, 2003	Kitt Peak	Spacewatch	·	1.6 km	MPC · JPL
661082	2003 UA_{92}	—	October 20, 2003	Kitt Peak	Spacewatch	·	2.1 km	MPC · JPL
661083	2003 UE_{93}	—	September 19, 2003	Palomar	NEAT	·	3.5 km	MPC · JPL
661084	2003 UB_{105}	—	September 27, 2003	Socorro	LINEAR	·	1.6 km	MPC · JPL
661085	2003 UO_{109}	—	October 19, 2003	Kitt Peak	Spacewatch	·	2.6 km	MPC · JPL
661086	2003 UC_{125}	—	September 29, 2003	Socorro	LINEAR	(5)	1.4 km	MPC · JPL
661087	2003 UX_{182}	—	September 27, 2003	Kitt Peak	Spacewatch	MRX	880 m	MPC · JPL
661088	2003 UP_{203}	—	October 21, 2003	Kitt Peak	Spacewatch	·	1.3 km	MPC · JPL
661089	2003 UX_{212}	—	October 23, 2003	Kitt Peak	Spacewatch	·	760 m	MPC · JPL
661090	2003 UZ_{214}	—	September 28, 2003	Kitt Peak	Spacewatch	MAS	610 m	MPC · JPL
661091	2003 UH_{220}	—	October 2, 2003	Kitt Peak	Spacewatch	·	820 m	MPC · JPL
661092	2003 UG_{236}	—	September 22, 2003	Kitt Peak	Spacewatch	·	530 m	MPC · JPL
661093	2003 UD_{245}	—	October 24, 2003	Kitt Peak	Spacewatch	·	490 m	MPC · JPL
661094	2003 UO_{273}	—	October 29, 2003	Kitt Peak	Spacewatch	·	620 m	MPC · JPL
661095	2003 UK_{285}	—	October 24, 2003	Kitt Peak	Spacewatch	·	850 m	MPC · JPL
661096	2003 UV_{288}	—	October 25, 2003	Kitt Peak	Spacewatch	·	1.0 km	MPC · JPL
661097	2003 UT_{297}	—	September 22, 2003	Palomar	NEAT	·	3.6 km	MPC · JPL
661098	2003 UH_{301}	—	October 17, 2003	Kitt Peak	Spacewatch	·	1.5 km	MPC · JPL
661099	2003 UX_{305}	—	October 18, 2003	Kitt Peak	Spacewatch	·	1.1 km	MPC · JPL
661100	2003 UF_{321}	—	September 20, 2003	Kitt Peak	Spacewatch	EOS	2.1 km	MPC · JPL

== 661101–661200 ==
back to top

Designation			Discovery			Properties		Ref
Permanent	Provisional	Named after	Date	Site	Discoverer(s)	Category	Diam.	Ref
661101	2003 UA_{323}	—	October 16, 2003	Kitt Peak	Spacewatch	NYS	830 m	MPC · JPL
661102	2003 UW_{325}	—	October 17, 2003	Apache Point	SDSS Collaboration	EOS	2.3 km	MPC · JPL
661103	2003 UK_{326}	—	October 17, 2003	Apache Point	SDSS Collaboration	H	420 m	MPC · JPL
661104	2003 UB_{333}	—	September 29, 2003	Kitt Peak	Spacewatch	·	1.9 km	MPC · JPL
661105	2003 UG_{335}	—	September 22, 2003	Kitt Peak	Spacewatch	·	2.0 km	MPC · JPL
661106	2003 UB_{347}	—	October 19, 2003	Apache Point	SDSS	·	820 m	MPC · JPL
661107	2003 UT_{350}	—	September 30, 2003	Kitt Peak	Spacewatch	(194)	1.4 km	MPC · JPL
661108	2003 UE_{352}	—	February 14, 2005	Kitt Peak	Spacewatch	·	1.8 km	MPC · JPL
661109	2003 UG_{353}	—	October 19, 2003	Apache Point	SDSS Collaboration	·	2.2 km	MPC · JPL
661110	2003 UG_{359}	—	September 28, 2003	Kitt Peak	Spacewatch	NYS	700 m	MPC · JPL
661111	2003 UQ_{360}	—	October 12, 1998	Kitt Peak	Spacewatch	·	2.4 km	MPC · JPL
661112	2003 UK_{363}	—	October 20, 2003	Kitt Peak	Spacewatch	WIT	830 m	MPC · JPL
661113	2003 UU_{369}	—	October 21, 2003	Kitt Peak	Spacewatch	HOF	2.4 km	MPC · JPL
661114	2003 UC_{370}	—	October 21, 2003	Kitt Peak	Spacewatch	·	610 m	MPC · JPL
661115	2003 UT_{385}	—	October 23, 2003	Kitt Peak	Spacewatch	HOF	2.1 km	MPC · JPL
661116	2003 UU_{386}	—	October 22, 2003	Apache Point	SDSS Collaboration	·	520 m	MPC · JPL
661117	2003 UF_{387}	—	October 23, 2003	Kitt Peak	Spacewatch	·	2.3 km	MPC · JPL
661118	2003 UK_{387}	—	October 22, 2003	Apache Point	SDSS Collaboration	·	1.7 km	MPC · JPL
661119	2003 UB_{388}	—	October 22, 2003	Apache Point	SDSS Collaboration	·	2.4 km	MPC · JPL
661120	2003 UL_{388}	—	October 20, 2003	Kitt Peak	Spacewatch	·	2.1 km	MPC · JPL
661121	2003 UY_{389}	—	October 22, 2003	Apache Point	SDSS Collaboration	615	1.3 km	MPC · JPL
661122	2003 UJ_{399}	—	October 22, 2003	Apache Point	SDSS Collaboration	·	2.9 km	MPC · JPL
661123	2003 UW_{399}	—	October 22, 2003	Kitt Peak	Spacewatch	·	1.5 km	MPC · JPL
661124	2003 UX_{405}	—	October 23, 2003	Apache Point	SDSS Collaboration	·	1.2 km	MPC · JPL
661125	2003 UQ_{406}	—	October 16, 2003	Palomar	NEAT	·	960 m	MPC · JPL
661126	2003 UM_{408}	—	October 23, 2003	Apache Point	SDSS Collaboration	·	1.7 km	MPC · JPL
661127	2003 UK_{411}	—	October 23, 2003	Apache Point	SDSS	·	2.8 km	MPC · JPL
661128	2003 UN_{412}	—	October 23, 2003	Apache Point	SDSS Collaboration	·	1.2 km	MPC · JPL
661129	2003 UT_{419}	—	February 13, 2012	Kitt Peak	Spacewatch	·	1.2 km	MPC · JPL
661130	2003 UM_{420}	—	September 17, 2012	Mount Lemmon	Mount Lemmon Survey	·	1.9 km	MPC · JPL
661131	2003 UB_{421}	—	October 19, 2003	Kitt Peak	Spacewatch	GEF	940 m	MPC · JPL
661132	2003 UQ_{421}	—	February 4, 2005	Kitt Peak	Spacewatch	·	1.4 km	MPC · JPL
661133	2003 UR_{421}	—	October 21, 2003	Kitt Peak	Spacewatch	·	1.8 km	MPC · JPL
661134	2003 UP_{422}	—	October 20, 2003	Kitt Peak	Spacewatch	·	1.8 km	MPC · JPL
661135	2003 UR_{422}	—	October 20, 2003	Kitt Peak	Spacewatch	GEF	1.0 km	MPC · JPL
661136	2003 UU_{425}	—	August 8, 2016	Haleakala	Pan-STARRS 1	·	1.5 km	MPC · JPL
661137	2003 UZ_{425}	—	November 8, 2007	Kitt Peak	Spacewatch	NYS	1.0 km	MPC · JPL
661138	2003 UL_{426}	—	September 25, 2006	Kitt Peak	Spacewatch	·	560 m	MPC · JPL
661139	2003 UR_{427}	—	October 19, 2012	Mount Lemmon	Mount Lemmon Survey	·	1.7 km	MPC · JPL
661140	2003 UN_{428}	—	July 3, 2016	Mount Lemmon	Mount Lemmon Survey	GEF	1.0 km	MPC · JPL
661141	2003 UU_{430}	—	May 11, 2007	Mount Lemmon	Mount Lemmon Survey	·	1.6 km	MPC · JPL
661142	2003 UJ_{431}	—	July 4, 2014	Haleakala	Pan-STARRS 1	·	2.9 km	MPC · JPL
661143	2003 UU_{431}	—	September 14, 2007	Catalina	CSS	·	1.4 km	MPC · JPL
661144	2003 UB_{432}	—	September 7, 2008	Mount Lemmon	Mount Lemmon Survey	·	2.2 km	MPC · JPL
661145	2003 US_{433}	—	April 18, 2015	Cerro Tololo-DECam	DECam	AGN	930 m	MPC · JPL
661146	2003 UY_{433}	—	January 4, 2016	Haleakala	Pan-STARRS 1	MAS	730 m	MPC · JPL
661147	2003 UT_{434}	—	August 1, 2011	Haleakala	Pan-STARRS 1	·	1.5 km	MPC · JPL
661148	2003 UX_{434}	—	August 27, 2006	Kitt Peak	Spacewatch	·	520 m	MPC · JPL
661149	2003 UH_{435}	—	January 14, 2011	Kitt Peak	Spacewatch	·	550 m	MPC · JPL
661150	2003 UT_{435}	—	October 25, 2003	Kitt Peak	Spacewatch	·	620 m	MPC · JPL
661151	2003 UJ_{441}	—	September 30, 2003	Ondřejov	Ondřejov, Observatoř	·	1.2 km	MPC · JPL
661152	2003 UH_{442}	—	July 21, 2006	Mount Lemmon	Mount Lemmon Survey	·	620 m	MPC · JPL
661153	2003 UD_{443}	—	October 16, 2003	Kitt Peak	Spacewatch	AGN	880 m	MPC · JPL
661154	2003 VT_{3}	—	November 15, 2003	Kitt Peak	Spacewatch	·	1.6 km	MPC · JPL
661155	2003 VR_{12}	—	September 17, 2012	Mount Lemmon	Mount Lemmon Survey	AGN	1.0 km	MPC · JPL
661156	2003 WW_{2}	—	November 16, 2003	Desert Moon	Stevens, B. L.	·	3.1 km	MPC · JPL
661157	2003 WO_{4}	—	November 16, 2003	Kitt Peak	Spacewatch	·	1.6 km	MPC · JPL
661158	2003 WW_{12}	—	November 19, 2003	Socorro	LINEAR	H	370 m	MPC · JPL
661159	2003 WC_{17}	—	November 18, 2003	Palomar	NEAT	V	610 m	MPC · JPL
661160	2003 WF_{18}	—	November 19, 2003	Palomar	NEAT	EUN	1.3 km	MPC · JPL
661161	2003 WD_{22}	—	October 27, 2003	Kitt Peak	Spacewatch	·	420 m	MPC · JPL
661162	2003 WX_{30}	—	November 18, 2003	Kitt Peak	Spacewatch	·	1.6 km	MPC · JPL
661163	2003 WP_{48}	—	October 2, 2003	Kitt Peak	Spacewatch	·	2.5 km	MPC · JPL
661164	2003 WS_{50}	—	October 22, 2003	Kitt Peak	Spacewatch	·	1.6 km	MPC · JPL
661165	2003 WK_{51}	—	October 25, 2003	Kitt Peak	Spacewatch	·	1.6 km	MPC · JPL
661166	2003 WR_{70}	—	November 20, 2003	Socorro	LINEAR	·	1.6 km	MPC · JPL
661167	2003 WS_{77}	—	November 20, 2003	Palomar	NEAT	·	1.9 km	MPC · JPL
661168	2003 WP_{78}	—	October 27, 2003	Kitt Peak	Spacewatch	·	3.1 km	MPC · JPL
661169	2003 WS_{90}	—	October 18, 2003	Anderson Mesa	LONEOS	·	1.8 km	MPC · JPL
661170	2003 WR_{186}	—	September 21, 2003	Palomar	NEAT	·	820 m	MPC · JPL
661171	2003 WE_{196}	—	November 21, 2003	Kitt Peak	Spacewatch	V	670 m	MPC · JPL
661172	2003 WJ_{197}	—	November 18, 2008	Kitt Peak	Spacewatch	KOR	1.2 km	MPC · JPL
661173	2003 WQ_{197}	—	January 28, 2014	Catalina	CSS	GEF	960 m	MPC · JPL
661174	2003 WV_{197}	—	August 27, 2014	Haleakala	Pan-STARRS 1	V	620 m	MPC · JPL
661175	2003 WX_{197}	—	January 3, 2013	Haleakala	Pan-STARRS 1	·	1.6 km	MPC · JPL
661176	2003 WA_{200}	—	March 18, 2010	Kitt Peak	Spacewatch	·	1.6 km	MPC · JPL
661177	2003 WA_{202}	—	December 28, 2013	Kitt Peak	Spacewatch	·	2.1 km	MPC · JPL
661178 Żywiecmed	2003 WD_{205}	Żywiecmed	August 12, 2013	Tincana	M. Kusiak, M. Żołnowski	EOS	1.7 km	MPC · JPL
661179	2003 WJ_{206}	—	September 17, 2012	Mount Lemmon	Mount Lemmon Survey	KOR	1.0 km	MPC · JPL
661180	2003 WX_{209}	—	January 4, 2016	Haleakala	Pan-STARRS 1	·	2.3 km	MPC · JPL
661181	2003 WB_{210}	—	April 25, 2007	Mount Lemmon	Mount Lemmon Survey	·	2.7 km	MPC · JPL
661182	2003 WD_{212}	—	December 2, 2016	Kitt Peak	Spacewatch	·	570 m	MPC · JPL
661183	2003 WU_{214}	—	November 24, 2003	Kitt Peak	Spacewatch	·	560 m	MPC · JPL
661184	2003 WM_{217}	—	November 24, 2003	Kitt Peak	Spacewatch	·	900 m	MPC · JPL
661185	2003 WT_{217}	—	November 19, 2003	Palomar	NEAT	·	810 m	MPC · JPL
661186	2003 XQ_{27}	—	December 1, 2003	Socorro	LINEAR	·	2.9 km	MPC · JPL
661187	2003 XW_{28}	—	December 1, 2003	Kitt Peak	Spacewatch	·	2.1 km	MPC · JPL
661188	2003 XP_{40}	—	November 19, 2003	Kitt Peak	Spacewatch	·	1.3 km	MPC · JPL
661189	2003 XB_{41}	—	November 26, 2003	Kitt Peak	Spacewatch	·	1.6 km	MPC · JPL
661190	2003 XX_{43}	—	March 30, 2008	Kitt Peak	Spacewatch	·	560 m	MPC · JPL
661191	2003 XM_{44}	—	December 1, 2003	Kitt Peak	Spacewatch	BRA	1.1 km	MPC · JPL
661192	2003 XS_{44}	—	March 27, 2012	Mount Lemmon	Mount Lemmon Survey	·	3.4 km	MPC · JPL
661193	2003 YL_{106}	—	December 22, 2003	Socorro	LINEAR	·	1.8 km	MPC · JPL
661194	2003 YA_{116}	—	December 22, 2003	Socorro	LINEAR	·	3.6 km	MPC · JPL
661195	2003 YK_{157}	—	November 24, 2003	Kitt Peak	Spacewatch	L5	10 km	MPC · JPL
661196	2003 YW_{170}	—	December 18, 2003	Kitt Peak	Spacewatch	AGN	1.3 km	MPC · JPL
661197	2003 YU_{174}	—	December 19, 2003	Socorro	LINEAR	·	2.1 km	MPC · JPL
661198	2003 YC_{183}	—	December 17, 2003	Kitt Peak	Spacewatch	·	1.0 km	MPC · JPL
661199	2003 YK_{183}	—	November 26, 2012	Mount Lemmon	Mount Lemmon Survey	HOF	2.2 km	MPC · JPL
661200	2003 YR_{183}	—	December 22, 2003	Kitt Peak	Spacewatch	EOS	1.8 km	MPC · JPL

== 661201–661300 ==
back to top

Designation			Discovery			Properties		Ref
Permanent	Provisional	Named after	Date	Site	Discoverer(s)	Category	Diam.	Ref
661201	2003 YZ_{183}	—	October 16, 2009	Mount Lemmon	Mount Lemmon Survey	·	790 m	MPC · JPL
661202	2003 YZ_{184}	—	December 22, 2003	Kitt Peak	Spacewatch	H	450 m	MPC · JPL
661203	2003 YM_{185}	—	October 22, 2006	Mount Lemmon	Mount Lemmon Survey	·	590 m	MPC · JPL
661204	2003 YS_{186}	—	January 11, 2010	Kitt Peak	Spacewatch	·	3.3 km	MPC · JPL
661205	2003 YK_{187}	—	April 10, 2016	Haleakala	Pan-STARRS 1	TIR	2.8 km	MPC · JPL
661206	2003 YZ_{187}	—	January 29, 2014	Catalina	CSS	·	1.3 km	MPC · JPL
661207	2003 YA_{188}	—	January 25, 2014	Haleakala	Pan-STARRS 1	·	480 m	MPC · JPL
661208	2003 YS_{188}	—	July 30, 2017	Haleakala	Pan-STARRS 1	·	1.7 km	MPC · JPL
661209	2004 AA_{9}	—	January 14, 2004	Palomar	NEAT	·	1.9 km	MPC · JPL
661210	2004 AY_{19}	—	January 15, 2004	Kitt Peak	Spacewatch	·	1.8 km	MPC · JPL
661211	2004 AS_{20}	—	August 18, 2006	Kitt Peak	Spacewatch	·	1.7 km	MPC · JPL
661212	2004 AU_{22}	—	December 22, 2003	Kitt Peak	Spacewatch	(18466)	1.9 km	MPC · JPL
661213	2004 AJ_{23}	—	January 15, 2004	Kitt Peak	Spacewatch	·	560 m	MPC · JPL
661214	2004 AO_{27}	—	December 9, 2015	Haleakala	Pan-STARRS 1	·	800 m	MPC · JPL
661215	2004 BG_{7}	—	December 21, 2003	Kitt Peak	Spacewatch	CLA	1.6 km	MPC · JPL
661216	2004 BU_{15}	—	December 29, 2003	Anderson Mesa	LONEOS	TIR	2.9 km	MPC · JPL
661217	2004 BO_{130}	—	January 16, 2004	Kitt Peak	Spacewatch	VER	2.9 km	MPC · JPL
661218	2004 BM_{139}	—	January 19, 2004	Kitt Peak	Spacewatch	·	630 m	MPC · JPL
661219	2004 BD_{140}	—	January 19, 2004	Kitt Peak	Spacewatch	·	1.7 km	MPC · JPL
661220	2004 BW_{153}	—	January 18, 2004	Palomar	NEAT	·	3.4 km	MPC · JPL
661221	2004 BA_{155}	—	January 28, 2004	Kitt Peak	Spacewatch	·	1.5 km	MPC · JPL
661222	2004 BK_{164}	—	January 30, 2004	Kitt Peak	Spacewatch	·	1.8 km	MPC · JPL
661223	2004 BL_{164}	—	January 19, 2004	Kitt Peak	Spacewatch	·	3.6 km	MPC · JPL
661224	2004 BX_{164}	—	March 1, 2008	Kitt Peak	Spacewatch	·	750 m	MPC · JPL
661225	2004 BH_{165}	—	February 20, 2014	Mount Lemmon	Mount Lemmon Survey	KOR	1.1 km	MPC · JPL
661226	2004 BU_{165}	—	January 17, 2004	Kitt Peak	Spacewatch	·	580 m	MPC · JPL
661227	2004 BX_{168}	—	September 30, 2011	Kitt Peak	Spacewatch	AGN	1.1 km	MPC · JPL
661228	2004 CD_{29}	—	January 19, 2004	Kitt Peak	Spacewatch	·	1.7 km	MPC · JPL
661229	2004 CV_{29}	—	January 30, 2004	Kitt Peak	Spacewatch	AGN	1.1 km	MPC · JPL
661230	2004 CN_{89}	—	February 11, 2004	Kitt Peak	Spacewatch	·	3.1 km	MPC · JPL
661231	2004 CT_{101}	—	February 12, 2004	Palomar	NEAT	·	2.9 km	MPC · JPL
661232	2004 CM_{104}	—	February 13, 2004	Palomar	NEAT	·	1.8 km	MPC · JPL
661233	2004 CO_{113}	—	February 17, 2004	Kitt Peak	Spacewatch	·	4.0 km	MPC · JPL
661234	2004 CU_{119}	—	December 19, 2003	Kitt Peak	Spacewatch	·	3.6 km	MPC · JPL
661235	2004 CJ_{122}	—	February 12, 2004	Kitt Peak	Spacewatch	·	1.8 km	MPC · JPL
661236	2004 CH_{133}	—	January 18, 2008	Kitt Peak	Spacewatch	·	880 m	MPC · JPL
661237	2004 DU_{9}	—	February 17, 2004	Kitt Peak	Spacewatch	(1547)	1.0 km	MPC · JPL
661238	2004 DA_{62}	—	February 25, 2004	Socorro	LINEAR	T_{j} (1.99) · damocloid · unusual	20 km	MPC · JPL
661239	2004 DF_{65}	—	February 26, 2004	Socorro	LINEAR	·	1.1 km	MPC · JPL
661240	2004 DA_{69}	—	February 26, 2004	Kitt Peak	Deep Ecliptic Survey	V	540 m	MPC · JPL
661241	2004 DS_{69}	—	February 26, 2004	Kitt Peak	Deep Ecliptic Survey	KOR	900 m	MPC · JPL
661242	2004 DL_{75}	—	February 17, 2004	Kitt Peak	Spacewatch	·	560 m	MPC · JPL
661243	2004 DS_{76}	—	February 18, 2004	Kitt Peak	Spacewatch	·	1.7 km	MPC · JPL
661244	2004 DV_{80}	—	November 14, 2007	Kitt Peak	Spacewatch	·	1.6 km	MPC · JPL
661245	2004 DH_{81}	—	April 1, 2014	Mount Lemmon	Mount Lemmon Survey	KOR	1.3 km	MPC · JPL
661246	2004 DM_{81}	—	December 21, 2008	Kitt Peak	Spacewatch	·	2.7 km	MPC · JPL
661247	2004 DO_{82}	—	July 4, 2016	Haleakala	Pan-STARRS 1	·	1.8 km	MPC · JPL
661248	2004 DD_{83}	—	February 26, 2004	Kitt Peak	Deep Ecliptic Survey	·	1.3 km	MPC · JPL
661249	2004 DV_{84}	—	July 21, 2006	Mount Lemmon	Mount Lemmon Survey	·	1.9 km	MPC · JPL
661250	2004 DF_{85}	—	October 3, 2006	Mount Lemmon	Mount Lemmon Survey	·	1.2 km	MPC · JPL
661251	2004 DG_{85}	—	September 15, 2007	Kitt Peak	Spacewatch	·	3.2 km	MPC · JPL
661252	2004 DL_{87}	—	April 6, 2008	Kitt Peak	Spacewatch	·	590 m	MPC · JPL
661253	2004 EM	—	March 11, 2004	Emerald Lane	L. Ball	ERI	1.4 km	MPC · JPL
661254	2004 EU_{6}	—	February 23, 2004	Socorro	LINEAR	H	530 m	MPC · JPL
661255	2004 EB_{15}	—	February 2, 2004	Anderson Mesa	LONEOS	·	470 m	MPC · JPL
661256	2004 EF_{74}	—	March 13, 2004	Palomar	NEAT	·	1.4 km	MPC · JPL
661257	2004 EC_{92}	—	March 15, 2004	Kitt Peak	Spacewatch	·	1.7 km	MPC · JPL
661258	2004 EJ_{93}	—	February 17, 2004	Kitt Peak	Spacewatch	·	2.4 km	MPC · JPL
661259	2004 EB_{105}	—	March 15, 2004	Kitt Peak	Spacewatch	·	1.9 km	MPC · JPL
661260	2004 EL_{110}	—	March 15, 2004	Kitt Peak	Spacewatch	·	3.1 km	MPC · JPL
661261	2004 EK_{117}	—	September 23, 2011	Haleakala	Pan-STARRS 1	KOR	1.3 km	MPC · JPL
661262	2004 FW_{5}	—	March 16, 2004	Kitt Peak	Spacewatch	·	410 m	MPC · JPL
661263	2004 FU_{39}	—	March 16, 2004	Socorro	LINEAR	H	590 m	MPC · JPL
661264	2004 FW_{57}	—	March 17, 2004	Kitt Peak	Spacewatch	·	560 m	MPC · JPL
661265	2004 FD_{67}	—	March 20, 2004	Socorro	LINEAR	EUN	1.1 km	MPC · JPL
661266	2004 FK_{112}	—	March 14, 2004	Palomar	NEAT	·	2.5 km	MPC · JPL
661267	2004 FZ_{122}	—	March 17, 2004	Kitt Peak	Spacewatch	·	1.0 km	MPC · JPL
661268	2004 FJ_{135}	—	March 27, 2004	Socorro	LINEAR	H	510 m	MPC · JPL
661269	2004 FT_{137}	—	March 29, 2004	Kitt Peak	Spacewatch	·	1.7 km	MPC · JPL
661270	2004 FX_{153}	—	March 17, 2004	Kitt Peak	Spacewatch	HOF	2.7 km	MPC · JPL
661271	2004 FS_{161}	—	March 14, 2004	Kitt Peak	Spacewatch	·	580 m	MPC · JPL
661272	2004 FK_{167}	—	August 19, 2006	Kitt Peak	Spacewatch	·	2.0 km	MPC · JPL
661273	2004 FW_{167}	—	December 31, 2007	Mount Lemmon	Mount Lemmon Survey	·	1.9 km	MPC · JPL
661274	2004 FA_{169}	—	April 1, 2016	Haleakala	Pan-STARRS 1	·	3.2 km	MPC · JPL
661275	2004 FY_{170}	—	September 25, 2005	Kitt Peak	Spacewatch	·	610 m	MPC · JPL
661276	2004 FA_{172}	—	June 4, 2011	Mount Lemmon	Mount Lemmon Survey	·	470 m	MPC · JPL
661277	2004 FX_{172}	—	April 6, 2014	Mount Lemmon	Mount Lemmon Survey	·	1.8 km	MPC · JPL
661278	2004 FK_{173}	—	August 26, 2012	Mount Lemmon	Mount Lemmon Survey	PHO	770 m	MPC · JPL
661279	2004 FL_{173}	—	January 23, 2014	Mount Lemmon	Mount Lemmon Survey	·	580 m	MPC · JPL
661280	2004 FC_{175}	—	March 20, 2014	Mount Lemmon	Mount Lemmon Survey	·	1.8 km	MPC · JPL
661281	2004 FK_{175}	—	March 6, 2011	Mount Lemmon	Mount Lemmon Survey	·	830 m	MPC · JPL
661282	2004 FQ_{175}	—	October 2, 2006	Mount Lemmon	Mount Lemmon Survey	KOR	1.3 km	MPC · JPL
661283	2004 FM_{178}	—	March 18, 2004	Kitt Peak	Spacewatch	H	460 m	MPC · JPL
661284	2004 GG_{6}	—	April 12, 2004	Kitt Peak	Spacewatch	·	1.6 km	MPC · JPL
661285	2004 GZ_{47}	—	April 12, 2004	Kitt Peak	Spacewatch	·	2.4 km	MPC · JPL
661286	2004 GH_{53}	—	April 13, 2004	Kitt Peak	Spacewatch	·	560 m	MPC · JPL
661287	2004 GC_{66}	—	April 13, 2004	Kitt Peak	Spacewatch	·	1.6 km	MPC · JPL
661288	2004 GC_{84}	—	April 14, 2004	Kitt Peak	Spacewatch	·	1.7 km	MPC · JPL
661289	2004 GM_{89}	—	February 2, 2016	Haleakala	Pan-STARRS 1	·	1.5 km	MPC · JPL
661290	2004 GN_{89}	—	September 17, 2006	Kitt Peak	Spacewatch	EOS	1.4 km	MPC · JPL
661291	2004 GZ_{89}	—	April 15, 2010	Mount Lemmon	Mount Lemmon Survey	·	2.6 km	MPC · JPL
661292	2004 GY_{90}	—	October 9, 2005	Kitt Peak	Spacewatch	·	690 m	MPC · JPL
661293	2004 GH_{92}	—	April 13, 2004	Apache Point	SDSS Collaboration	·	1.4 km	MPC · JPL
661294	2004 HV_{21}	—	April 16, 2004	Kitt Peak	Spacewatch	·	2.1 km	MPC · JPL
661295	2004 HD_{32}	—	March 31, 2004	Kitt Peak	Spacewatch	NYS	1.1 km	MPC · JPL
661296	2004 HB_{68}	—	April 20, 2004	Kitt Peak	Spacewatch	·	520 m	MPC · JPL
661297	2004 HE_{68}	—	April 20, 2004	Kitt Peak	Spacewatch	·	1.5 km	MPC · JPL
661298	2004 HE_{72}	—	April 25, 2004	Kitt Peak	Spacewatch	·	1.4 km	MPC · JPL
661299	2004 HF_{80}	—	April 3, 2008	Mount Lemmon	Mount Lemmon Survey	·	1.2 km	MPC · JPL
661300	2004 HQ_{80}	—	August 24, 2008	Kitt Peak	Spacewatch	·	640 m	MPC · JPL

== 661301–661400 ==
back to top

Designation			Discovery			Properties		Ref
Permanent	Provisional	Named after	Date	Site	Discoverer(s)	Category	Diam.	Ref
661301	2004 HQ_{83}	—	December 19, 2014	Haleakala	Pan-STARRS 1	H	510 m	MPC · JPL
661302	2004 HD_{84}	—	December 26, 2017	Haleakala	Pan-STARRS 1	·	900 m	MPC · JPL
661303	2004 JS_{28}	—	April 26, 2004	Kitt Peak	Spacewatch	·	2.8 km	MPC · JPL
661304	2004 JS_{37}	—	May 13, 2004	Kitt Peak	Spacewatch	·	2.4 km	MPC · JPL
661305	2004 JX_{56}	—	October 6, 2012	Mount Lemmon	Mount Lemmon Survey	·	3.1 km	MPC · JPL
661306	2004 JE_{58}	—	February 23, 2007	Kitt Peak	Spacewatch	·	740 m	MPC · JPL
661307	2004 KN_{15}	—	May 23, 2004	Kitt Peak	Spacewatch	·	3.6 km	MPC · JPL
661308	2004 KA_{22}	—	May 19, 2004	Kitt Peak	Spacewatch	·	1.7 km	MPC · JPL
661309	2004 LK_{12}	—	June 9, 2004	Kitt Peak	Spacewatch	BRA	1.8 km	MPC · JPL
661310	2004 LF_{18}	—	June 15, 2004	Siding Spring	SSS	·	1.2 km	MPC · JPL
661311	2004 LX_{19}	—	June 11, 2004	Kitt Peak	Spacewatch	·	930 m	MPC · JPL
661312	2004 LT_{21}	—	June 12, 2004	Kitt Peak	Spacewatch	EUN	960 m	MPC · JPL
661313	2004 LA_{28}	—	June 13, 2004	Kitt Peak	Spacewatch	EUN	860 m	MPC · JPL
661314	2004 MA_{10}	—	July 5, 2014	Haleakala	Pan-STARRS 1	·	2.1 km	MPC · JPL
661315	2004 MG_{10}	—	June 27, 2004	Kitt Peak	Spacewatch	·	900 m	MPC · JPL
661316	2004 NS_{18}	—	July 14, 2004	Socorro	LINEAR	·	810 m	MPC · JPL
661317	2004 NQ_{19}	—	July 14, 2004	Socorro	LINEAR	·	1.1 km	MPC · JPL
661318	2004 NF_{20}	—	July 14, 2004	Socorro	LINEAR	·	840 m	MPC · JPL
661319	2004 NB_{26}	—	July 11, 2004	Socorro	LINEAR	·	1.5 km	MPC · JPL
661320	2004 NH_{34}	—	October 30, 2017	Haleakala	Pan-STARRS 1	·	1.2 km	MPC · JPL
661321	2004 OX_{15}	—	March 22, 2012	Catalina	CSS	·	1.7 km	MPC · JPL
661322	2004 OQ_{16}	—	September 14, 2014	Haleakala	Pan-STARRS 1	DOR	2.3 km	MPC · JPL
661323	2004 OD_{17}	—	July 16, 2004	Cerro Tololo	Deep Ecliptic Survey	·	1.2 km	MPC · JPL
661324	2004 PJ_{25}	—	August 8, 2004	Socorro	LINEAR	·	1.1 km	MPC · JPL
661325	2004 PX_{26}	—	August 6, 2004	Palomar	NEAT	H	550 m	MPC · JPL
661326	2004 PY_{47}	—	July 9, 2004	Palomar	NEAT	·	2.0 km	MPC · JPL
661327	2004 PE_{49}	—	August 8, 2004	Socorro	LINEAR	·	540 m	MPC · JPL
661328	2004 PW_{59}	—	August 9, 2004	Anderson Mesa	LONEOS	·	2.7 km	MPC · JPL
661329	2004 PV_{75}	—	July 17, 2004	Socorro	LINEAR	·	1.3 km	MPC · JPL
661330	2004 PL_{80}	—	August 9, 2004	Socorro	LINEAR	·	910 m	MPC · JPL
661331	2004 PF_{97}	—	August 10, 2004	Socorro	LINEAR	·	1.2 km	MPC · JPL
661332	2004 PP_{107}	—	August 8, 2004	Palomar	NEAT	T_{j} (2.98)	1.8 km	MPC · JPL
661333	2004 PY_{117}	—	August 15, 2004	Mauna Kea	J. J. Kavelaars	other TNO	137 km	MPC · JPL
661334	2004 PE_{118}	—	August 25, 2012	Haleakala	Pan-STARRS 1	PHO	770 m	MPC · JPL
661335	2004 PG_{118}	—	January 31, 2006	Kitt Peak	Spacewatch	·	640 m	MPC · JPL
661336	2004 PM_{118}	—	March 5, 2013	Catalina	CSS	·	2.5 km	MPC · JPL
661337	2004 PT_{119}	—	August 12, 2004	Cerro Tololo	Deep Ecliptic Survey	NYS	620 m	MPC · JPL
661338	2004 PU_{119}	—	November 12, 2005	Kitt Peak	Spacewatch	·	2.0 km	MPC · JPL
661339	2004 PS_{121}	—	August 9, 2004	Anderson Mesa	LONEOS	·	1.6 km	MPC · JPL
661340	2004 QD_{5}	—	August 22, 2004	Siding Spring	SSS	·	1.8 km	MPC · JPL
661341	2004 QY_{7}	—	August 16, 2004	Siding Spring	SSS	JUN	1.0 km	MPC · JPL
661342	2004 QE_{13}	—	August 21, 2004	Siding Spring	SSS	·	610 m	MPC · JPL
661343	2004 QK_{17}	—	August 25, 2004	Socorro	LINEAR	PHO	800 m	MPC · JPL
661344	2004 QW_{25}	—	August 19, 2004	Socorro	LINEAR	(1547)	1.2 km	MPC · JPL
661345	2004 QR_{30}	—	April 21, 2012	Mount Lemmon	Mount Lemmon Survey	·	1.1 km	MPC · JPL
661346	2004 QT_{30}	—	January 20, 2015	Haleakala	Pan-STARRS 1	(5)	1.1 km	MPC · JPL
661347	2004 QE_{31}	—	May 3, 2016	Haleakala	Pan-STARRS 1	(5)	1.2 km	MPC · JPL
661348	2004 QJ_{31}	—	October 23, 2008	Kitt Peak	Spacewatch	V	510 m	MPC · JPL
661349	2004 QS_{31}	—	November 29, 2013	Haleakala	Pan-STARRS 1	ADE	1.4 km	MPC · JPL
661350	2004 QZ_{32}	—	August 23, 2004	Kitt Peak	Spacewatch	·	1.3 km	MPC · JPL
661351	2004 QU_{33}	—	August 4, 2017	Haleakala	Pan-STARRS 1	·	1.3 km	MPC · JPL
661352	2004 QA_{34}	—	April 10, 2014	Haleakala	Pan-STARRS 1	·	720 m	MPC · JPL
661353	2004 QJ_{34}	—	August 1, 2011	Siding Spring	SSS	·	680 m	MPC · JPL
661354	2004 QY_{34}	—	August 27, 2004	Catalina	CSS	·	1.3 km	MPC · JPL
661355	2004 QS_{36}	—	September 9, 2015	Haleakala	Pan-STARRS 1	·	750 m	MPC · JPL
661356	2004 QE_{38}	—	August 23, 2004	Kitt Peak	Spacewatch	THM	2.0 km	MPC · JPL
661357	2004 RA_{1}	—	September 4, 2004	Needville	Borgman, D., J. Dellinger	·	1.1 km	MPC · JPL
661358	2004 RL_{5}	—	September 4, 2004	Palomar	NEAT	·	860 m	MPC · JPL
661359	2004 RR_{6}	—	September 5, 2004	Palomar	NEAT	·	3.4 km	MPC · JPL
661360	2004 RR_{13}	—	September 6, 2004	Needville	Needville	·	780 m	MPC · JPL
661361	2004 RM_{16}	—	August 7, 2004	Palomar	NEAT	·	1.4 km	MPC · JPL
661362	2004 RV_{17}	—	September 7, 2004	Kitt Peak	Spacewatch	·	1.8 km	MPC · JPL
661363	2004 RL_{18}	—	September 7, 2004	Socorro	LINEAR	·	3.1 km	MPC · JPL
661364	2004 RQ_{30}	—	September 7, 2004	Socorro	LINEAR	·	540 m	MPC · JPL
661365	2004 RB_{32}	—	August 21, 2004	Catalina	CSS	·	2.0 km	MPC · JPL
661366	2004 RY_{39}	—	September 7, 2004	Kitt Peak	Spacewatch	·	1.0 km	MPC · JPL
661367	2004 RH_{40}	—	August 25, 2004	Kitt Peak	Spacewatch	·	500 m	MPC · JPL
661368	2004 RQ_{41}	—	September 7, 2004	Socorro	LINEAR	·	710 m	MPC · JPL
661369	2004 RF_{49}	—	August 21, 2004	Catalina	CSS	(5)	1.4 km	MPC · JPL
661370	2004 RT_{49}	—	September 8, 2004	Socorro	LINEAR	NYS	860 m	MPC · JPL
661371	2004 RN_{52}	—	September 8, 2004	Socorro	LINEAR	·	1.0 km	MPC · JPL
661372	2004 RU_{53}	—	September 8, 2004	Socorro	LINEAR	·	570 m	MPC · JPL
661373	2004 RH_{64}	—	September 8, 2004	Socorro	LINEAR	·	3.1 km	MPC · JPL
661374	2004 RO_{68}	—	September 8, 2004	Socorro	LINEAR	·	1.0 km	MPC · JPL
661375	2004 RQ_{69}	—	September 8, 2004	Socorro	LINEAR	·	1.2 km	MPC · JPL
661376	2004 RX_{70}	—	September 8, 2004	Socorro	LINEAR	·	810 m	MPC · JPL
661377	2004 RM_{71}	—	August 23, 2004	Kitt Peak	Spacewatch	(5)	920 m	MPC · JPL
661378	2004 RZ_{79}	—	September 8, 2004	Socorro	LINEAR	·	580 m	MPC · JPL
661379	2004 RW_{82}	—	September 9, 2004	Socorro	LINEAR	·	1.3 km	MPC · JPL
661380	2004 RE_{85}	—	September 7, 2004	Bergisch Gladbach	W. Bickel	·	2.4 km	MPC · JPL
661381	2004 RY_{85}	—	September 6, 2004	Siding Spring	SSS	PHO	580 m	MPC · JPL
661382	2004 RW_{87}	—	July 17, 2004	Cerro Tololo	Deep Ecliptic Survey	·	1.4 km	MPC · JPL
661383	2004 RJ_{97}	—	September 8, 2004	Palomar	NEAT	·	1.2 km	MPC · JPL
661384	2004 RS_{97}	—	September 8, 2004	Socorro	LINEAR	·	1.1 km	MPC · JPL
661385	2004 RZ_{102}	—	September 8, 2004	Socorro	LINEAR	·	940 m	MPC · JPL
661386	2004 RD_{122}	—	September 7, 2004	Kitt Peak	Spacewatch	·	2.5 km	MPC · JPL
661387	2004 RX_{124}	—	September 7, 2004	Kitt Peak	Spacewatch	·	2.6 km	MPC · JPL
661388	2004 RF_{129}	—	September 7, 2004	Kitt Peak	Spacewatch	·	810 m	MPC · JPL
661389	2004 RX_{132}	—	September 7, 2004	Kitt Peak	Spacewatch	·	750 m	MPC · JPL
661390	2004 RP_{135}	—	September 7, 2004	Kitt Peak	Spacewatch	·	650 m	MPC · JPL
661391	2004 RH_{141}	—	September 8, 2004	Socorro	LINEAR	·	840 m	MPC · JPL
661392	2004 RQ_{142}	—	August 26, 2004	Catalina	CSS	·	480 m	MPC · JPL
661393	2004 RL_{144}	—	September 8, 2004	Palomar	NEAT	·	2.1 km	MPC · JPL
661394	2004 RQ_{150}	—	August 22, 2004	Siding Spring	SSS	·	840 m	MPC · JPL
661395	2004 RG_{153}	—	August 23, 2004	Kitt Peak	Spacewatch	EUN	1.2 km	MPC · JPL
661396	2004 RR_{154}	—	August 22, 2004	Kitt Peak	Spacewatch	·	680 m	MPC · JPL
661397	2004 RW_{155}	—	September 10, 2004	Socorro	LINEAR	TIR	2.1 km	MPC · JPL
661398	2004 RR_{157}	—	September 10, 2004	Socorro	LINEAR	·	1.3 km	MPC · JPL
661399	2004 RP_{160}	—	September 10, 2004	Kitt Peak	Spacewatch	HYG	2.1 km	MPC · JPL
661400	2004 RL_{166}	—	September 7, 2004	Socorro	LINEAR	·	980 m	MPC · JPL

== 661401–661500 ==
back to top

Designation			Discovery			Properties		Ref
Permanent	Provisional	Named after	Date	Site	Discoverer(s)	Category	Diam.	Ref
661401	2004 RM_{166}	—	September 7, 2004	Socorro	LINEAR	·	840 m	MPC · JPL
661402	2004 RZ_{168}	—	September 8, 2004	Socorro	LINEAR	·	770 m	MPC · JPL
661403	2004 RC_{169}	—	September 8, 2004	Palomar	NEAT	·	1.1 km	MPC · JPL
661404	2004 RX_{169}	—	September 7, 2004	Goodricke-Pigott	R. A. Tucker	JUN	800 m	MPC · JPL
661405	2004 RL_{170}	—	September 8, 2004	Apache Point	SDSS Collaboration	·	770 m	MPC · JPL
661406	2004 RL_{172}	—	September 9, 2004	Kitt Peak	Spacewatch	TEL	900 m	MPC · JPL
661407	2004 RL_{204}	—	September 13, 2004	Palomar	NEAT	·	690 m	MPC · JPL
661408	2004 RM_{209}	—	September 11, 2004	Socorro	LINEAR	THB	2.4 km	MPC · JPL
661409	2004 RW_{212}	—	August 10, 2004	Palomar	NEAT	·	3.9 km	MPC · JPL
661410	2004 RU_{214}	—	September 11, 2004	Socorro	LINEAR	·	1.5 km	MPC · JPL
661411	2004 RP_{215}	—	September 11, 2004	Socorro	LINEAR	·	1.8 km	MPC · JPL
661412	2004 RV_{215}	—	September 11, 2004	Socorro	LINEAR	·	1.3 km	MPC · JPL
661413	2004 RK_{219}	—	September 11, 2004	Socorro	LINEAR	·	1.5 km	MPC · JPL
661414	2004 RR_{223}	—	September 8, 2004	Palomar	NEAT	·	1.4 km	MPC · JPL
661415	2004 RK_{229}	—	September 9, 2004	Kitt Peak	Spacewatch	·	2.4 km	MPC · JPL
661416	2004 RK_{234}	—	September 10, 2004	Needville	Dillon, W. G., Eastman, M.	THM	2.1 km	MPC · JPL
661417	2004 RO_{247}	—	August 11, 2004	Palomar	NEAT	·	1.9 km	MPC · JPL
661418	2004 RG_{256}	—	September 7, 2004	Kitt Peak	Spacewatch	·	530 m	MPC · JPL
661419	2004 RG_{258}	—	September 10, 2004	Kitt Peak	Spacewatch	·	2.1 km	MPC · JPL
661420	2004 RQ_{259}	—	May 30, 2003	Cerro Tololo	Deep Ecliptic Survey	·	1.1 km	MPC · JPL
661421	2004 RT_{259}	—	September 10, 2004	Kitt Peak	Spacewatch	·	1.1 km	MPC · JPL
661422	2004 RV_{259}	—	September 10, 2004	Kitt Peak	Spacewatch	·	1.1 km	MPC · JPL
661423	2004 RW_{265}	—	August 13, 2004	Cerro Tololo	Deep Ecliptic Survey	·	1.4 km	MPC · JPL
661424	2004 RX_{265}	—	September 10, 2004	Kitt Peak	Spacewatch	·	1.5 km	MPC · JPL
661425	2004 RX_{271}	—	September 11, 2004	Kitt Peak	Spacewatch	·	1.8 km	MPC · JPL
661426	2004 RM_{274}	—	September 11, 2004	Kitt Peak	Spacewatch	·	1.2 km	MPC · JPL
661427	2004 RX_{280}	—	September 15, 2004	Kitt Peak	Spacewatch	·	1.3 km	MPC · JPL
661428	2004 RO_{281}	—	September 15, 2004	Kitt Peak	Spacewatch	·	1.0 km	MPC · JPL
661429	2004 RK_{283}	—	September 15, 2004	Kitt Peak	Spacewatch	·	2.2 km	MPC · JPL
661430	2004 RG_{293}	—	September 11, 2004	Socorro	LINEAR	NYS	820 m	MPC · JPL
661431	2004 RW_{296}	—	September 11, 2004	Kitt Peak	Spacewatch	·	1.4 km	MPC · JPL
661432	2004 RD_{297}	—	September 11, 2004	Kitt Peak	Spacewatch	·	2.2 km	MPC · JPL
661433	2004 RX_{297}	—	September 11, 2004	Kitt Peak	Spacewatch	·	750 m	MPC · JPL
661434	2004 RO_{299}	—	September 11, 2004	Kitt Peak	Spacewatch	MAS	750 m	MPC · JPL
661435	2004 RR_{300}	—	September 11, 2004	Kitt Peak	Spacewatch	·	2.4 km	MPC · JPL
661436	2004 RQ_{301}	—	September 11, 2004	Kitt Peak	Spacewatch	·	2.5 km	MPC · JPL
661437	2004 RL_{311}	—	September 11, 2004	Socorro	LINEAR	·	780 m	MPC · JPL
661438	2004 RS_{312}	—	September 15, 2004	Socorro	LINEAR	·	1.9 km	MPC · JPL
661439	2004 RC_{313}	—	September 15, 2004	Kitt Peak	Spacewatch	·	490 m	MPC · JPL
661440	2004 RA_{319}	—	September 12, 2004	Kitt Peak	Spacewatch	·	880 m	MPC · JPL
661441	2004 RH_{321}	—	September 13, 2004	Palomar	NEAT	·	1.2 km	MPC · JPL
661442	2004 RW_{326}	—	September 13, 2004	Kitt Peak	Spacewatch	NAE	2.6 km	MPC · JPL
661443	2004 RD_{327}	—	September 13, 2004	Kitt Peak	Spacewatch	PHO	730 m	MPC · JPL
661444	2004 RX_{331}	—	September 14, 2004	Palomar	NEAT	·	1.9 km	MPC · JPL
661445	2004 RY_{338}	—	September 17, 2004	Socorro	LINEAR	·	590 m	MPC · JPL
661446	2004 RN_{340}	—	September 7, 2004	Palomar	NEAT	·	1.5 km	MPC · JPL
661447	2004 RR_{341}	—	September 8, 2004	Apache Point	SDSS Collaboration	·	760 m	MPC · JPL
661448	2004 RF_{343}	—	September 7, 2004	Socorro	LINEAR	·	960 m	MPC · JPL
661449	2004 RM_{344}	—	April 4, 2008	Kitt Peak	Spacewatch	EOS	1.6 km	MPC · JPL
661450	2004 RP_{347}	—	September 16, 2004	Kitt Peak	Spacewatch	·	790 m	MPC · JPL
661451	2004 RG_{351}	—	September 11, 2004	Kitt Peak	Spacewatch	·	1.2 km	MPC · JPL
661452	2004 RP_{357}	—	February 9, 2010	Mount Lemmon	Mount Lemmon Survey	·	760 m	MPC · JPL
661453	2004 RR_{357}	—	August 27, 2009	Kitt Peak	Spacewatch	·	1.8 km	MPC · JPL
661454	2004 RC_{358}	—	October 22, 2005	Kitt Peak	Spacewatch	THM	2.3 km	MPC · JPL
661455	2004 RW_{358}	—	April 1, 2012	Mount Lemmon	Mount Lemmon Survey	·	1.6 km	MPC · JPL
661456	2004 RX_{358}	—	September 11, 2004	Kitt Peak	Spacewatch	V	520 m	MPC · JPL
661457	2004 RC_{359}	—	June 29, 2011	Kitt Peak	Spacewatch	·	760 m	MPC · JPL
661458	2004 RZ_{359}	—	October 25, 2011	Haleakala	Pan-STARRS 1	·	510 m	MPC · JPL
661459	2004 RN_{360}	—	March 27, 2011	Mount Lemmon	Mount Lemmon Survey	H	390 m	MPC · JPL
661460	2004 RS_{360}	—	October 31, 2016	Mount Lemmon	Mount Lemmon Survey	·	2.7 km	MPC · JPL
661461	2004 RL_{361}	—	September 10, 2004	Kitt Peak	Spacewatch	·	570 m	MPC · JPL
661462	2004 RW_{361}	—	September 20, 2011	Mount Lemmon	Mount Lemmon Survey	·	530 m	MPC · JPL
661463	2004 RY_{361}	—	October 25, 2009	Kitt Peak	Spacewatch	·	1.8 km	MPC · JPL
661464	2004 RR_{363}	—	July 24, 2015	Haleakala	Pan-STARRS 1	EOS	1.4 km	MPC · JPL
661465	2004 RS_{363}	—	July 17, 2004	Cerro Tololo	Deep Ecliptic Survey	·	760 m	MPC · JPL
661466	2004 SQ	—	September 16, 2004	Socorro	LINEAR	·	1.5 km	MPC · JPL
661467	2004 SO_{9}	—	September 8, 2004	Socorro	LINEAR	·	1.1 km	MPC · JPL
661468	2004 SG_{28}	—	September 16, 2004	Kitt Peak	Spacewatch	·	1.3 km	MPC · JPL
661469	2004 SS_{33}	—	September 17, 2004	Socorro	LINEAR	·	1.4 km	MPC · JPL
661470	2004 SQ_{34}	—	August 25, 2004	Kitt Peak	Spacewatch	·	2.2 km	MPC · JPL
661471	2004 SB_{38}	—	September 17, 2004	Kitt Peak	Spacewatch	·	1.3 km	MPC · JPL
661472	2004 SX_{42}	—	September 18, 2004	Socorro	LINEAR	·	1.2 km	MPC · JPL
661473	2004 SK_{57}	—	September 21, 2017	Haleakala	Pan-STARRS 1	·	1.6 km	MPC · JPL
661474	2004 SY_{61}	—	September 23, 2004	Kitt Peak	Spacewatch	·	1.3 km	MPC · JPL
661475	2004 SQ_{62}	—	September 21, 2004	Anderson Mesa	LONEOS	·	1.5 km	MPC · JPL
661476	2004 SX_{62}	—	June 4, 2016	Mount Lemmon	Mount Lemmon Survey	·	1.3 km	MPC · JPL
661477	2004 SG_{63}	—	November 27, 2013	Haleakala	Pan-STARRS 1	(5)	1.1 km	MPC · JPL
661478	2004 SP_{63}	—	October 23, 2011	Kitt Peak	Spacewatch	·	490 m	MPC · JPL
661479	2004 SG_{64}	—	November 11, 2013	Kitt Peak	Spacewatch	·	1.2 km	MPC · JPL
661480	2004 SJ_{64}	—	December 11, 2013	Haleakala	Pan-STARRS 1	·	1.1 km	MPC · JPL
661481	2004 SV_{64}	—	March 4, 2017	Haleakala	Pan-STARRS 1	·	660 m	MPC · JPL
661482	2004 SK_{65}	—	October 1, 2013	Mount Lemmon	Mount Lemmon Survey	·	1.3 km	MPC · JPL
661483	2004 SS_{65}	—	September 17, 2004	Anderson Mesa	LONEOS	·	630 m	MPC · JPL
661484	2004 SA_{66}	—	May 15, 2008	Mount Lemmon	Mount Lemmon Survey	·	1.4 km	MPC · JPL
661485	2004 TA_{4}	—	October 4, 2004	Kitt Peak	Spacewatch	·	1.5 km	MPC · JPL
661486	2004 TO_{5}	—	October 5, 2004	Kitt Peak	Spacewatch	EUN	780 m	MPC · JPL
661487	2004 TV_{9}	—	October 4, 2004	Kitt Peak	Spacewatch	·	1.7 km	MPC · JPL
661488	2004 TL_{14}	—	October 9, 2004	Socorro	LINEAR	·	720 m	MPC · JPL
661489	2004 TK_{21}	—	September 17, 2004	Anderson Mesa	LONEOS	·	2.7 km	MPC · JPL
661490	2004 TX_{21}	—	October 4, 2004	Kitt Peak	Spacewatch	·	2.5 km	MPC · JPL
661491	2004 TC_{31}	—	October 4, 2004	Kitt Peak	Spacewatch	EOS	1.7 km	MPC · JPL
661492	2004 TX_{37}	—	September 17, 2004	Kitt Peak	Spacewatch	T_{j} (2.81) · AMO +1km	2.6 km	MPC · JPL
661493	2004 TU_{39}	—	October 4, 2004	Kitt Peak	Spacewatch	·	1.2 km	MPC · JPL
661494	2004 TR_{46}	—	October 4, 2004	Kitt Peak	Spacewatch	·	1.0 km	MPC · JPL
661495	2004 TC_{64}	—	October 4, 2004	Kitt Peak	Spacewatch	·	1.3 km	MPC · JPL
661496	2004 TX_{64}	—	October 4, 2004	Anderson Mesa	LONEOS	·	1.2 km	MPC · JPL
661497	2004 TT_{82}	—	October 5, 2004	Kitt Peak	Spacewatch	·	950 m	MPC · JPL
661498	2004 TG_{93}	—	October 5, 2004	Kitt Peak	Spacewatch	·	1.7 km	MPC · JPL
661499	2004 TB_{99}	—	October 5, 2004	Kitt Peak	Spacewatch	EOS	1.5 km	MPC · JPL
661500	2004 TM_{100}	—	October 5, 2004	Palomar	NEAT	·	1.8 km	MPC · JPL

== 661501–661600 ==
back to top

Designation			Discovery			Properties		Ref
Permanent	Provisional	Named after	Date	Site	Discoverer(s)	Category	Diam.	Ref
661501	2004 TA_{111}	—	October 7, 2004	Kitt Peak	Spacewatch	HYG	2.3 km	MPC · JPL
661502	2004 TG_{111}	—	October 7, 2004	Kitt Peak	Spacewatch	·	900 m	MPC · JPL
661503	2004 TO_{121}	—	September 18, 2004	Socorro	LINEAR	·	1.2 km	MPC · JPL
661504	2004 TF_{126}	—	September 14, 2004	Goodricke-Pigott	R. A. Tucker	·	1.1 km	MPC · JPL
661505	2004 TL_{126}	—	September 20, 2004	Siding Spring	SSS	·	830 m	MPC · JPL
661506	2004 TM_{132}	—	September 14, 2004	Socorro	LINEAR	PHO	870 m	MPC · JPL
661507	2004 TX_{132}	—	October 7, 2004	Palomar	NEAT	(1547)	1.4 km	MPC · JPL
661508	2004 TV_{134}	—	September 17, 2004	Socorro	LINEAR	·	380 m	MPC · JPL
661509	2004 TL_{145}	—	September 24, 2004	Kitt Peak	Spacewatch	·	1.1 km	MPC · JPL
661510	2004 TE_{150}	—	October 6, 2004	Kitt Peak	Spacewatch	·	1.4 km	MPC · JPL
661511	2004 TN_{153}	—	October 6, 2004	Kitt Peak	Spacewatch	·	1.7 km	MPC · JPL
661512	2004 TH_{169}	—	October 7, 2004	Socorro	LINEAR	·	3.4 km	MPC · JPL
661513	2004 TC_{178}	—	October 7, 2004	Kitt Peak	Spacewatch	·	1.5 km	MPC · JPL
661514	2004 TK_{193}	—	October 7, 2004	Kitt Peak	Spacewatch	·	2.5 km	MPC · JPL
661515	2004 TM_{194}	—	October 7, 2004	Kitt Peak	Spacewatch	·	3.2 km	MPC · JPL
661516	2004 TB_{195}	—	October 7, 2004	Kitt Peak	Spacewatch	MRX	760 m	MPC · JPL
661517	2004 TP_{200}	—	September 13, 2004	Palomar	NEAT	·	1.4 km	MPC · JPL
661518	2004 TV_{209}	—	October 8, 2004	Kitt Peak	Spacewatch	ELF	2.6 km	MPC · JPL
661519	2004 TK_{210}	—	September 22, 2004	Kitt Peak	Spacewatch	·	1.8 km	MPC · JPL
661520	2004 TH_{214}	—	October 9, 2004	Kitt Peak	Spacewatch	·	1.4 km	MPC · JPL
661521	2004 TE_{216}	—	September 18, 2004	Piszkéstető	K. Sárneczky	·	940 m	MPC · JPL
661522	2004 TQ_{220}	—	October 6, 2004	Kitt Peak	Spacewatch	MAR	1.0 km	MPC · JPL
661523	2004 TM_{222}	—	October 7, 2004	Socorro	LINEAR	·	900 m	MPC · JPL
661524	2004 TZ_{223}	—	October 8, 2004	Kitt Peak	Spacewatch	·	1.7 km	MPC · JPL
661525	2004 TS_{224}	—	October 8, 2004	Kitt Peak	Spacewatch	·	2.1 km	MPC · JPL
661526	2004 TO_{230}	—	September 17, 2004	Kitt Peak	Spacewatch	·	590 m	MPC · JPL
661527	2004 TC_{242}	—	October 11, 2004	Kitt Peak	Spacewatch	·	3.7 km	MPC · JPL
661528	2004 TG_{257}	—	October 9, 2004	Kitt Peak	Spacewatch	·	870 m	MPC · JPL
661529	2004 TB_{259}	—	October 9, 2004	Kitt Peak	Spacewatch	·	2.3 km	MPC · JPL
661530	2004 TZ_{261}	—	October 9, 2004	Kitt Peak	Spacewatch	·	1.1 km	MPC · JPL
661531	2004 TM_{267}	—	October 9, 2004	Kitt Peak	Spacewatch	·	780 m	MPC · JPL
661532	2004 TC_{268}	—	October 9, 2004	Kitt Peak	Spacewatch	EUN	1.1 km	MPC · JPL
661533	2004 TO_{286}	—	October 9, 2004	Socorro	LINEAR	·	2.3 km	MPC · JPL
661534	2004 TZ_{291}	—	October 10, 2004	Socorro	LINEAR	·	1.4 km	MPC · JPL
661535	2004 TZ_{292}	—	April 24, 2003	Anderson Mesa	LONEOS	(194)	1.8 km	MPC · JPL
661536	2004 TO_{298}	—	October 6, 2004	Kitt Peak	Spacewatch	·	2.4 km	MPC · JPL
661537	2004 TP_{298}	—	December 10, 2009	Mount Lemmon	Mount Lemmon Survey	·	1.2 km	MPC · JPL
661538	2004 TG_{304}	—	October 10, 2004	Kitt Peak	Spacewatch	·	2.9 km	MPC · JPL
661539	2004 TT_{304}	—	October 10, 2004	Kitt Peak	Spacewatch	·	2.4 km	MPC · JPL
661540	2004 TX_{304}	—	October 10, 2004	Kitt Peak	Spacewatch	·	720 m	MPC · JPL
661541	2004 TJ_{315}	—	October 11, 2004	Kitt Peak	Spacewatch	MIS	1.9 km	MPC · JPL
661542	2004 TS_{316}	—	October 11, 2004	Kitt Peak	Spacewatch	·	1.0 km	MPC · JPL
661543	2004 TH_{317}	—	October 11, 2004	Kitt Peak	Spacewatch	·	1.2 km	MPC · JPL
661544	2004 TX_{325}	—	October 14, 2004	Palomar	NEAT	MAR	1.2 km	MPC · JPL
661545	2004 TQ_{331}	—	October 9, 2004	Kitt Peak	Spacewatch	EOS	2.0 km	MPC · JPL
661546	2004 TL_{333}	—	October 9, 2004	Kitt Peak	Spacewatch	EOS	2.0 km	MPC · JPL
661547	2004 TB_{341}	—	October 13, 2004	Kitt Peak	Spacewatch	·	1.3 km	MPC · JPL
661548	2004 TN_{347}	—	October 12, 2004	Moletai	K. Černis, Zdanavicius, J.	·	2.2 km	MPC · JPL
661549	2004 TZ_{351}	—	August 13, 2004	Cerro Tololo	Deep Ecliptic Survey	KOR	1.5 km	MPC · JPL
661550	2004 TT_{365}	—	October 7, 2004	Socorro	LINEAR	·	1.1 km	MPC · JPL
661551	2004 TG_{372}	—	October 23, 2004	Kitt Peak	Spacewatch	·	720 m	MPC · JPL
661552	2004 TQ_{372}	—	March 14, 2007	Kitt Peak	Spacewatch	EOS	1.5 km	MPC · JPL
661553	2004 TY_{372}	—	September 21, 2011	Haleakala	Pan-STARRS 1	NYS	780 m	MPC · JPL
661554	2004 TZ_{372}	—	September 20, 2011	Mount Lemmon	Mount Lemmon Survey	V	600 m	MPC · JPL
661555	2004 TD_{373}	—	February 16, 2012	Haleakala	Pan-STARRS 1	·	3.3 km	MPC · JPL
661556	2004 TT_{373}	—	October 17, 2010	Mount Lemmon	Mount Lemmon Survey	·	2.5 km	MPC · JPL
661557	2004 TK_{374}	—	October 7, 2004	Kitt Peak	Spacewatch	NYS	770 m	MPC · JPL
661558	2004 TU_{374}	—	October 8, 2004	Kitt Peak	Spacewatch	·	2.5 km	MPC · JPL
661559	2004 TR_{375}	—	May 21, 2014	Haleakala	Pan-STARRS 1	·	840 m	MPC · JPL
661560	2004 TV_{375}	—	October 7, 2004	Kitt Peak	Spacewatch	·	1.3 km	MPC · JPL
661561	2004 TY_{375}	—	March 22, 2015	Haleakala	Pan-STARRS 1	·	1.0 km	MPC · JPL
661562	2004 TR_{377}	—	October 13, 2004	Kitt Peak	Spacewatch	ADE	1.7 km	MPC · JPL
661563	2004 TA_{378}	—	October 7, 2004	Kitt Peak	Spacewatch	·	1.1 km	MPC · JPL
661564	2004 TL_{379}	—	April 12, 2011	Mount Lemmon	Mount Lemmon Survey	·	1.4 km	MPC · JPL
661565	2004 TU_{379}	—	October 30, 2010	Mount Lemmon	Mount Lemmon Survey	·	3.0 km	MPC · JPL
661566	2004 TX_{379}	—	October 23, 2008	Mount Lemmon	Mount Lemmon Survey	·	970 m	MPC · JPL
661567	2004 TF_{382}	—	October 7, 2004	Kitt Peak	Spacewatch	·	650 m	MPC · JPL
661568	2004 TV_{384}	—	October 9, 2004	Kitt Peak	Spacewatch	·	1.5 km	MPC · JPL
661569	2004 UC_{3}	—	October 18, 2004	Socorro	LINEAR	·	1.7 km	MPC · JPL
661570	2004 UR_{5}	—	October 20, 2004	Socorro	LINEAR	·	1.7 km	MPC · JPL
661571	2004 UJ_{9}	—	October 23, 2004	Kitt Peak	Spacewatch	·	920 m	MPC · JPL
661572	2004 UR_{11}	—	October 23, 2004	Kitt Peak	Spacewatch	·	1.2 km	MPC · JPL
661573	2004 VS_{32}	—	November 3, 2004	Kitt Peak	Spacewatch	·	1.1 km	MPC · JPL
661574	2004 VM_{40}	—	October 11, 2004	Kitt Peak	Spacewatch	·	1.9 km	MPC · JPL
661575	2004 VD_{44}	—	November 4, 2004	Kitt Peak	Spacewatch	·	940 m	MPC · JPL
661576	2004 VC_{46}	—	November 4, 2004	Kitt Peak	Spacewatch	·	1.5 km	MPC · JPL
661577	2004 VK_{75}	—	November 11, 2004	Kitt Peak	Spacewatch	H	400 m	MPC · JPL
661578	2004 VU_{93}	—	November 10, 2004	Kitt Peak	Spacewatch	·	2.3 km	MPC · JPL
661579	2004 VX_{94}	—	November 10, 2004	Kitt Peak	Spacewatch	EOS	1.9 km	MPC · JPL
661580	2004 VD_{98}	—	October 28, 1995	Kitt Peak	Spacewatch	·	1.4 km	MPC · JPL
661581	2004 VZ_{119}	—	October 14, 2004	Kitt Peak	Spacewatch	·	900 m	MPC · JPL
661582	2004 VY_{131}	—	October 30, 2010	Kitt Peak	Spacewatch	·	2.7 km	MPC · JPL
661583	2004 VC_{132}	—	November 26, 2013	Haleakala	Pan-STARRS 1	·	1.5 km	MPC · JPL
661584	2004 VK_{132}	—	October 26, 2013	Mount Lemmon	Mount Lemmon Survey	·	1.4 km	MPC · JPL
661585	2004 VL_{132}	—	March 12, 2010	Kitt Peak	Spacewatch	·	980 m	MPC · JPL
661586	2004 VM_{132}	—	January 1, 2014	Haleakala	Pan-STARRS 1	·	1.2 km	MPC · JPL
661587	2004 VY_{132}	—	June 3, 2014	Haleakala	Pan-STARRS 1	·	810 m	MPC · JPL
661588	2004 VF_{133}	—	March 5, 2013	Piszkés-tető	K. Sárneczky, M. Langbroek	·	750 m	MPC · JPL
661589	2004 VV_{134}	—	October 14, 2013	Kitt Peak	Spacewatch	NEM	1.7 km	MPC · JPL
661590	2004 WV_{2}	—	November 17, 2004	Siding Spring	SSS	EUN	1.0 km	MPC · JPL
661591	2004 WL_{13}	—	October 10, 2008	Catalina	CSS	·	1.5 km	MPC · JPL
661592	2004 XR_{3}	—	December 3, 2004	Cordell-Lorenz	D. T. Durig, Riehl, R. A.	·	1.3 km	MPC · JPL
661593	2004 XZ_{18}	—	December 8, 2004	Socorro	LINEAR	·	1.3 km	MPC · JPL
661594	2004 XS_{24}	—	December 9, 2004	Catalina	CSS	·	1.7 km	MPC · JPL
661595	2004 XM_{52}	—	December 9, 2004	Kitt Peak	Spacewatch	EOS	2.1 km	MPC · JPL
661596	2004 XX_{55}	—	December 10, 2004	Kitt Peak	Spacewatch	EOS	1.9 km	MPC · JPL
661597	2004 XG_{57}	—	December 10, 2004	Kitt Peak	Spacewatch	V	800 m	MPC · JPL
661598	2004 XO_{106}	—	November 11, 2004	Kitt Peak	Spacewatch	·	1.6 km	MPC · JPL
661599	2004 XH_{113}	—	October 9, 1997	Kitt Peak	Spacewatch	·	540 m	MPC · JPL
661600	2004 XW_{113}	—	December 10, 2004	Kitt Peak	Spacewatch	·	590 m	MPC · JPL

== 661601–661700 ==
back to top

Designation			Discovery			Properties		Ref
Permanent	Provisional	Named after	Date	Site	Discoverer(s)	Category	Diam.	Ref
661601	2004 XH_{114}	—	December 10, 2004	Kitt Peak	Spacewatch	·	1.6 km	MPC · JPL
661602	2004 XS_{128}	—	December 14, 2004	Socorro	LINEAR	JUN	1.1 km	MPC · JPL
661603	2004 XB_{137}	—	December 15, 2004	Socorro	LINEAR	·	1.3 km	MPC · JPL
661604	2004 XP_{139}	—	December 13, 2004	Kitt Peak	Spacewatch	·	1.0 km	MPC · JPL
661605	2004 XS_{141}	—	December 14, 2004	Kitt Peak	Spacewatch	·	2.2 km	MPC · JPL
661606	2004 XC_{153}	—	December 15, 2004	Kitt Peak	Spacewatch	·	1.4 km	MPC · JPL
661607	2004 XH_{153}	—	December 15, 2004	Kitt Peak	Spacewatch	THM	2.1 km	MPC · JPL
661608	2004 XV_{160}	—	December 14, 2004	Kitt Peak	Spacewatch	·	1.2 km	MPC · JPL
661609	2004 XM_{164}	—	December 14, 2004	Calvin-Rehoboth	L. A. Molnar	·	1.6 km	MPC · JPL
661610	2004 XJ_{185}	—	November 4, 2004	Catalina	CSS	·	2.2 km	MPC · JPL
661611	2004 XD_{193}	—	May 21, 2011	Mount Lemmon	Mount Lemmon Survey	·	1.0 km	MPC · JPL
661612	2004 XJ_{194}	—	December 26, 2014	Haleakala	Pan-STARRS 1	BRA	1.6 km	MPC · JPL
661613	2004 XM_{194}	—	October 7, 2008	Mount Lemmon	Mount Lemmon Survey	NEM	1.8 km	MPC · JPL
661614	2004 XK_{196}	—	January 3, 2013	Mount Lemmon	Mount Lemmon Survey	·	1.3 km	MPC · JPL
661615	2004 XN_{196}	—	October 28, 2014	Haleakala	Pan-STARRS 1	·	610 m	MPC · JPL
661616	2004 XL_{197}	—	November 2, 2013	Kitt Peak	Spacewatch	·	1.3 km	MPC · JPL
661617	2004 XP_{197}	—	October 9, 2013	Mount Lemmon	Mount Lemmon Survey	·	1.4 km	MPC · JPL
661618	2004 XR_{197}	—	September 23, 2008	Mount Lemmon	Mount Lemmon Survey	·	1.3 km	MPC · JPL
661619	2004 XZ_{197}	—	August 24, 2014	Kitt Peak	Spacewatch	·	660 m	MPC · JPL
661620	2004 XQ_{198}	—	April 10, 2013	Haleakala	Pan-STARRS 1	·	920 m	MPC · JPL
661621	2004 YH_{15}	—	December 19, 2004	Mount Lemmon	Mount Lemmon Survey	MAS	690 m	MPC · JPL
661622	2004 YQ_{17}	—	December 19, 2004	Mount Lemmon	Mount Lemmon Survey	·	1.1 km	MPC · JPL
661623	2004 YX_{23}	—	January 8, 1994	Kitt Peak	Spacewatch	·	2.7 km	MPC · JPL
661624	2004 YU_{26}	—	December 19, 2004	Mount Lemmon	Mount Lemmon Survey	·	1.1 km	MPC · JPL
661625	2004 YV_{27}	—	December 16, 2004	Kitt Peak	Spacewatch	THM	2.2 km	MPC · JPL
661626	2004 YK_{32}	—	November 19, 2004	Catalina	CSS	·	2.9 km	MPC · JPL
661627	2004 YD_{35}	—	October 23, 2003	Kitt Peak	Spacewatch	·	2.8 km	MPC · JPL
661628	2005 AZ_{35}	—	January 13, 2005	Socorro	LINEAR	·	1.5 km	MPC · JPL
661629	2005 AE_{64}	—	January 13, 2005	Kitt Peak	Spacewatch	·	920 m	MPC · JPL
661630	2005 AV_{70}	—	January 15, 2005	Kitt Peak	Spacewatch	·	2.2 km	MPC · JPL
661631	2005 AT_{77}	—	January 15, 2005	Kitt Peak	Spacewatch	·	1.1 km	MPC · JPL
661632	2005 AF_{83}	—	May 24, 2006	Kitt Peak	Spacewatch	MAR	1.2 km	MPC · JPL
661633	2005 AP_{83}	—	January 13, 2005	Kitt Peak	Spacewatch	·	2.6 km	MPC · JPL
661634	2005 AT_{83}	—	February 25, 2006	Kitt Peak	Spacewatch	·	1.7 km	MPC · JPL
661635	2005 BV_{9}	—	January 16, 2005	Socorro	LINEAR	EOS	2.2 km	MPC · JPL
661636	2005 BS_{15}	—	January 16, 2005	Kitt Peak	Spacewatch	·	1.5 km	MPC · JPL
661637	2005 BJ_{32}	—	January 16, 2005	Mauna Kea	Veillet, C.	·	930 m	MPC · JPL
661638	2005 BJ_{35}	—	January 16, 2005	Mauna Kea	Veillet, C.	·	850 m	MPC · JPL
661639	2005 BT_{41}	—	January 16, 2005	Mauna Kea	Veillet, C.	·	1.0 km	MPC · JPL
661640	2005 BJ_{46}	—	January 16, 2005	Mauna Kea	Veillet, C.	·	2.3 km	MPC · JPL
661641	2005 BT_{50}	—	January 16, 2005	Kitt Peak	Spacewatch	(5)	1.3 km	MPC · JPL
661642	2005 BA_{51}	—	November 8, 2008	Mount Lemmon	Mount Lemmon Survey	·	1.5 km	MPC · JPL
661643	2005 CO_{32}	—	January 16, 2005	Kitt Peak	Spacewatch	MAS	710 m	MPC · JPL
661644	2005 CS_{46}	—	February 2, 2005	Kitt Peak	Spacewatch	THM	2.0 km	MPC · JPL
661645	2005 CK_{85}	—	March 13, 2010	Mount Lemmon	Mount Lemmon Survey	·	1.6 km	MPC · JPL
661646	2005 CM_{86}	—	January 14, 2011	Mount Lemmon	Mount Lemmon Survey	·	840 m	MPC · JPL
661647	2005 CG_{87}	—	December 18, 2015	Mount Lemmon	Mount Lemmon Survey	·	1.1 km	MPC · JPL
661648	2005 CV_{88}	—	February 4, 2005	Kitt Peak	Spacewatch	MRX	1.0 km	MPC · JPL
661649	2005 EC_{33}	—	March 1, 2005	Mauna Kea	Ryan, W. H.	·	2.0 km	MPC · JPL
661650	2005 EP_{52}	—	March 4, 2005	Kitt Peak	Spacewatch	·	2.7 km	MPC · JPL
661651	2005 EW_{54}	—	March 4, 2005	Kitt Peak	Spacewatch	·	3.2 km	MPC · JPL
661652	2005 EV_{59}	—	March 4, 2005	Mount Lemmon	Mount Lemmon Survey	·	1.9 km	MPC · JPL
661653	2005 EM_{63}	—	March 4, 2005	Mount Lemmon	Mount Lemmon Survey	·	2.0 km	MPC · JPL
661654	2005 EJ_{70}	—	March 8, 2005	Kitt Peak	Spacewatch	H	390 m	MPC · JPL
661655	2005 ET_{80}	—	October 17, 2003	Palomar	NEAT	·	1.8 km	MPC · JPL
661656	2005 EH_{82}	—	January 17, 2005	Kitt Peak	Spacewatch	MAS	720 m	MPC · JPL
661657	2005 EE_{105}	—	March 4, 2005	Mount Lemmon	Mount Lemmon Survey	·	1.3 km	MPC · JPL
661658	2005 EZ_{120}	—	March 8, 2005	Kitt Peak	Spacewatch	·	2.6 km	MPC · JPL
661659	2005 EK_{129}	—	March 3, 2005	Catalina	CSS	·	940 m	MPC · JPL
661660	2005 EV_{131}	—	March 9, 2005	Mount Lemmon	Mount Lemmon Survey	NYS	1.1 km	MPC · JPL
661661	2005 ES_{136}	—	March 9, 2005	Mount Lemmon	Mount Lemmon Survey	·	1.2 km	MPC · JPL
661662	2005 EL_{168}	—	March 9, 2005	Anderson Mesa	LONEOS	·	1.7 km	MPC · JPL
661663	2005 EH_{180}	—	March 9, 2005	Kitt Peak	Spacewatch	·	900 m	MPC · JPL
661664	2005 EY_{183}	—	March 9, 2005	Mount Lemmon	Mount Lemmon Survey	·	600 m	MPC · JPL
661665	2005 EL_{192}	—	December 20, 2004	Mount Lemmon	Mount Lemmon Survey	·	2.8 km	MPC · JPL
661666 Chenchengpo	2005 EW_{228}	Chenchengpo	August 6, 2007	Lulin	C.-S. Lin, Q. Ye	TIN	980 m	MPC · JPL
661667	2005 EH_{231}	—	March 10, 2005	Mount Lemmon	Mount Lemmon Survey	·	3.3 km	MPC · JPL
661668	2005 ED_{251}	—	March 10, 2005	Mount Lemmon	Mount Lemmon Survey	·	1.6 km	MPC · JPL
661669	2005 EU_{258}	—	March 11, 2005	Mount Lemmon	Mount Lemmon Survey	·	690 m	MPC · JPL
661670	2005 EJ_{262}	—	March 13, 2005	Mount Lemmon	Mount Lemmon Survey	·	3.0 km	MPC · JPL
661671	2005 EH_{272}	—	March 1, 2005	Kitt Peak	Spacewatch	·	3.2 km	MPC · JPL
661672	2005 ED_{274}	—	September 17, 2012	Mount Lemmon	Mount Lemmon Survey	KOR	1.1 km	MPC · JPL
661673	2005 EH_{278}	—	March 9, 2005	Mount Lemmon	Mount Lemmon Survey	·	1.6 km	MPC · JPL
661674	2005 ET_{321}	—	March 8, 2005	Mount Lemmon	Mount Lemmon Survey	·	2.6 km	MPC · JPL
661675	2005 EF_{331}	—	March 14, 2005	Catalina	CSS	PHO	830 m	MPC · JPL
661676	2005 EU_{335}	—	March 9, 2005	Mount Lemmon	Mount Lemmon Survey	·	1.6 km	MPC · JPL
661677	2005 EO_{336}	—	June 8, 2012	Haleakala	Pan-STARRS 1	·	3.2 km	MPC · JPL
661678	2005 EB_{338}	—	October 7, 2007	Mount Lemmon	Mount Lemmon Survey	AGN	1.0 km	MPC · JPL
661679	2005 EF_{338}	—	August 14, 2012	Kitt Peak	Spacewatch	·	1.8 km	MPC · JPL
661680	2005 EH_{344}	—	September 21, 2012	Mount Lemmon	Mount Lemmon Survey	·	1.8 km	MPC · JPL
661681	2005 EF_{348}	—	March 10, 2005	Mount Lemmon	Mount Lemmon Survey	·	1.4 km	MPC · JPL
661682	2005 EJ_{348}	—	March 10, 2005	Kitt Peak	Deep Ecliptic Survey	KOR	1 km	MPC · JPL
661683	2005 EO_{348}	—	March 10, 2005	Mount Lemmon	Mount Lemmon Survey	AGN	980 m	MPC · JPL
661684	2005 FW_{7}	—	March 10, 2005	Catalina	CSS	·	910 m	MPC · JPL
661685	2005 FK_{13}	—	March 8, 2005	Mount Lemmon	Mount Lemmon Survey	MAS	780 m	MPC · JPL
661686	2005 FN_{14}	—	March 18, 2005	Catalina	CSS	·	2.3 km	MPC · JPL
661687	2005 FM_{19}	—	March 16, 2005	Mount Lemmon	Mount Lemmon Survey	PHO	1.2 km	MPC · JPL
661688	2005 FO_{20}	—	March 10, 2005	Mount Lemmon	Mount Lemmon Survey	·	2.6 km	MPC · JPL
661689	2005 GE_{19}	—	April 2, 2005	Palomar	NEAT	·	2.4 km	MPC · JPL
661690	2005 GD_{61}	—	April 2, 2005	Kitt Peak	Spacewatch	·	510 m	MPC · JPL
661691	2005 GP_{66}	—	April 2, 2005	Mount Lemmon	Mount Lemmon Survey	·	1.8 km	MPC · JPL
661692	2005 GA_{75}	—	April 5, 2005	Mount Lemmon	Mount Lemmon Survey	·	570 m	MPC · JPL
661693	2005 GF_{87}	—	April 4, 2005	Mount Lemmon	Mount Lemmon Survey	·	500 m	MPC · JPL
661694	2005 GZ_{97}	—	March 9, 2005	Mount Lemmon	Mount Lemmon Survey	·	680 m	MPC · JPL
661695	2005 GV_{104}	—	April 10, 2005	Kitt Peak	Spacewatch	·	1.6 km	MPC · JPL
661696	2005 GK_{109}	—	January 19, 2004	Kitt Peak	Spacewatch	·	2.7 km	MPC · JPL
661697	2005 GC_{125}	—	April 10, 2005	Mount Lemmon	Mount Lemmon Survey	·	1.8 km	MPC · JPL
661698	2005 GG_{155}	—	April 10, 2005	Mount Lemmon	Mount Lemmon Survey	·	650 m	MPC · JPL
661699	2005 GF_{160}	—	April 2, 2005	Kitt Peak	Spacewatch	·	3.9 km	MPC · JPL
661700	2005 GP_{175}	—	April 14, 2005	Kitt Peak	Spacewatch	·	2.3 km	MPC · JPL

== 661701–661800 ==
back to top

Designation			Discovery			Properties		Ref
Permanent	Provisional	Named after	Date	Site	Discoverer(s)	Category	Diam.	Ref
661701	2005 GV_{206}	—	March 13, 2005	Anderson Mesa	LONEOS	PHO	930 m	MPC · JPL
661702	2005 GB_{216}	—	April 1, 2005	Kitt Peak	Spacewatch	MAS	750 m	MPC · JPL
661703	2005 GQ_{219}	—	February 9, 2005	Kitt Peak	Spacewatch	EOS	2.2 km	MPC · JPL
661704	2005 GF_{229}	—	March 17, 2005	Mount Lemmon	Mount Lemmon Survey	·	3.5 km	MPC · JPL
661705	2005 GG_{231}	—	June 7, 2013	Haleakala	Pan-STARRS 1	NYS	1.0 km	MPC · JPL
661706	2005 GC_{233}	—	October 23, 2017	Mount Lemmon	Mount Lemmon Survey	·	1.5 km	MPC · JPL
661707	2005 GC_{238}	—	October 24, 2011	Haleakala	Pan-STARRS 1	·	880 m	MPC · JPL
661708	2005 GH_{241}	—	April 2, 2005	Mount Lemmon	Mount Lemmon Survey	BRA	1.3 km	MPC · JPL
661709	2005 JU_{7}	—	March 10, 2005	Mount Lemmon	Mount Lemmon Survey	·	2.5 km	MPC · JPL
661710	2005 JZ_{7}	—	May 4, 2005	Mauna Kea	Veillet, C.	·	1.7 km	MPC · JPL
661711	2005 JG_{18}	—	May 4, 2005	Mount Lemmon	Mount Lemmon Survey	·	2.7 km	MPC · JPL
661712	2005 JE_{25}	—	May 3, 2005	Kitt Peak	Spacewatch	·	3.8 km	MPC · JPL
661713	2005 JO_{32}	—	May 4, 2005	Mount Lemmon	Mount Lemmon Survey	·	1.1 km	MPC · JPL
661714	2005 JH_{35}	—	May 4, 2005	Kitt Peak	Spacewatch	·	1.7 km	MPC · JPL
661715	2005 JG_{41}	—	May 7, 2005	Mount Lemmon	Mount Lemmon Survey	·	620 m	MPC · JPL
661716	2005 JK_{41}	—	May 7, 2005	Mount Lemmon	Mount Lemmon Survey	PHO	680 m	MPC · JPL
661717	2005 JR_{53}	—	May 4, 2005	Kitt Peak	Spacewatch	·	950 m	MPC · JPL
661718	2005 JN_{57}	—	May 7, 2005	Kitt Peak	Spacewatch	NYS	1.0 km	MPC · JPL
661719	2005 JS_{74}	—	May 8, 2005	Mount Lemmon	Mount Lemmon Survey	(17392)	1.3 km	MPC · JPL
661720	2005 JG_{79}	—	May 10, 2005	Mount Lemmon	Mount Lemmon Survey	·	1.3 km	MPC · JPL
661721	2005 JV_{87}	—	March 10, 2005	Catalina	CSS	·	1.4 km	MPC · JPL
661722	2005 JJ_{90}	—	May 11, 2005	Mount Lemmon	Mount Lemmon Survey	MAS	760 m	MPC · JPL
661723	2005 JQ_{102}	—	May 9, 2005	Kitt Peak	Spacewatch	·	3.3 km	MPC · JPL
661724	2005 JU_{116}	—	May 10, 2005	Mount Lemmon	Mount Lemmon Survey	·	640 m	MPC · JPL
661725	2005 JO_{132}	—	May 14, 2005	Kitt Peak	Spacewatch	·	1.7 km	MPC · JPL
661726	2005 JJ_{148}	—	May 15, 2005	Palomar	NEAT	·	1.9 km	MPC · JPL
661727	2005 JY_{149}	—	May 3, 2005	Kitt Peak	Spacewatch	·	3.4 km	MPC · JPL
661728	2005 JR_{161}	—	May 8, 2005	Mount Lemmon	Mount Lemmon Survey	·	1.2 km	MPC · JPL
661729	2005 JV_{165}	—	May 11, 2005	Kitt Peak	Spacewatch	·	1.8 km	MPC · JPL
661730	2005 JN_{172}	—	May 10, 2005	Cerro Tololo	Deep Ecliptic Survey	NYS	1.2 km	MPC · JPL
661731	2005 JY_{177}	—	March 15, 2005	Mount Lemmon	Mount Lemmon Survey	MAR	1.2 km	MPC · JPL
661732	2005 JA_{178}	—	May 10, 2005	Cerro Tololo	Deep Ecliptic Survey	·	750 m	MPC · JPL
661733	2005 JZ_{182}	—	May 10, 2005	Mount Lemmon	Mount Lemmon Survey	·	490 m	MPC · JPL
661734	2005 JO_{188}	—	September 28, 2006	Kitt Peak	Spacewatch	·	630 m	MPC · JPL
661735	2005 KH_{15}	—	May 16, 2005	Mount Lemmon	Mount Lemmon Survey	·	1.1 km	MPC · JPL
661736	2005 LT_{6}	—	May 20, 2005	Mount Lemmon	Mount Lemmon Survey	NYS	1.1 km	MPC · JPL
661737	2005 LL_{12}	—	May 19, 2005	Mount Lemmon	Mount Lemmon Survey	·	1.8 km	MPC · JPL
661738	2005 LZ_{17}	—	May 15, 2005	Mount Lemmon	Mount Lemmon Survey	·	1.0 km	MPC · JPL
661739	2005 LU_{38}	—	June 11, 2005	Kitt Peak	Spacewatch	·	2.8 km	MPC · JPL
661740	2005 LW_{46}	—	June 13, 2005	Kitt Peak	Spacewatch	·	560 m	MPC · JPL
661741	2005 LJ_{49}	—	June 10, 2005	Kitt Peak	Spacewatch	·	540 m	MPC · JPL
661742	2005 LJ_{50}	—	May 16, 2005	Kitt Peak	Spacewatch	·	2.1 km	MPC · JPL
661743	2005 LW_{55}	—	May 16, 2005	Mount Lemmon	Mount Lemmon Survey	·	500 m	MPC · JPL
661744	2005 LZ_{55}	—	February 14, 2012	Haleakala	Pan-STARRS 1	·	990 m	MPC · JPL
661745	2005 MR	—	June 17, 2005	Mount Lemmon	Mount Lemmon Survey	·	460 m	MPC · JPL
661746	2005 MF_{23}	—	June 29, 2005	Kitt Peak	Spacewatch	·	670 m	MPC · JPL
661747	2005 MM_{23}	—	May 16, 2005	Kitt Peak	Spacewatch	TIR	2.7 km	MPC · JPL
661748	2005 MJ_{39}	—	June 13, 2005	Kitt Peak	Spacewatch	·	990 m	MPC · JPL
661749	2005 MC_{40}	—	June 30, 2005	Kitt Peak	Spacewatch	RAF	710 m	MPC · JPL
661750	2005 MK_{49}	—	June 18, 2005	Mount Lemmon	Mount Lemmon Survey	·	2.1 km	MPC · JPL
661751	2005 MP_{55}	—	February 26, 2008	Mount Lemmon	Mount Lemmon Survey	·	1.1 km	MPC · JPL
661752	2005 NC_{4}	—	July 2, 2005	Kitt Peak	Spacewatch	·	930 m	MPC · JPL
661753	2005 NM_{10}	—	July 3, 2005	Mount Lemmon	Mount Lemmon Survey	·	1.1 km	MPC · JPL
661754	2005 NA_{26}	—	July 4, 2005	Kitt Peak	Spacewatch	·	2.0 km	MPC · JPL
661755	2005 NO_{38}	—	July 6, 2005	Kitt Peak	Spacewatch	·	880 m	MPC · JPL
661756	2005 NN_{48}	—	July 7, 2005	Kitt Peak	Spacewatch	·	570 m	MPC · JPL
661757	2005 NF_{49}	—	July 4, 2005	Palomar	NEAT	·	820 m	MPC · JPL
661758	2005 NM_{51}	—	June 28, 2005	Kitt Peak	Spacewatch	·	800 m	MPC · JPL
661759	2005 NX_{51}	—	July 8, 2005	Kitt Peak	Spacewatch	·	2.4 km	MPC · JPL
661760	2005 NC_{65}	—	July 1, 2005	Kitt Peak	Spacewatch	·	1.1 km	MPC · JPL
661761	2005 NT_{79}	—	July 10, 2005	Siding Spring	SSS	·	570 m	MPC · JPL
661762	2005 NP_{82}	—	July 6, 2005	Siding Spring	SSS	damocloid	10 km	MPC · JPL
661763	2005 NC_{86}	—	July 3, 2005	Mount Lemmon	Mount Lemmon Survey	·	580 m	MPC · JPL
661764	2005 NH_{123}	—	July 8, 2005	Kitt Peak	Spacewatch	·	1.4 km	MPC · JPL
661765	2005 NM_{126}	—	July 6, 2005	Kitt Peak	Spacewatch	PAD	1.8 km	MPC · JPL
661766	2005 NF_{128}	—	May 15, 2013	Haleakala	Pan-STARRS 1	BRG	1.2 km	MPC · JPL
661767	2005 NK_{128}	—	January 11, 2008	Mount Lemmon	Mount Lemmon Survey	·	1.1 km	MPC · JPL
661768	2005 NN_{128}	—	November 15, 2010	Mount Lemmon	Mount Lemmon Survey	·	1.5 km	MPC · JPL
661769	2005 NX_{130}	—	June 17, 2018	Haleakala	Pan-STARRS 1	·	1.7 km	MPC · JPL
661770	2005 NG_{131}	—	May 1, 2009	Kitt Peak	Spacewatch	MRX	830 m	MPC · JPL
661771	2005 NZ_{131}	—	September 5, 2010	Mount Lemmon	Mount Lemmon Survey	·	1.6 km	MPC · JPL
661772	2005 NT_{132}	—	July 4, 2005	Mount Lemmon	Mount Lemmon Survey	(5)	960 m	MPC · JPL
661773	2005 NW_{132}	—	July 9, 2005	Kitt Peak	Spacewatch	·	460 m	MPC · JPL
661774	2005 OT	—	June 28, 2005	Palomar	NEAT	·	800 m	MPC · JPL
661775	2005 OB_{3}	—	July 30, 2005	Socorro	LINEAR	·	1.6 km	MPC · JPL
661776	2005 OJ_{4}	—	July 27, 2005	Palomar	NEAT	·	2.5 km	MPC · JPL
661777	2005 OV_{10}	—	July 27, 2005	Palomar	NEAT	·	720 m	MPC · JPL
661778	2005 OO_{32}	—	July 30, 2005	Palomar	NEAT	GEF	1.3 km	MPC · JPL
661779	2005 OC_{33}	—	August 17, 2016	Haleakala	Pan-STARRS 1	·	2.3 km	MPC · JPL
661780	2005 OS_{33}	—	July 28, 2005	Palomar	NEAT	JUN	750 m	MPC · JPL
661781	2005 OJ_{35}	—	July 31, 2005	Palomar	NEAT	·	2.5 km	MPC · JPL
661782	2005 PP_{5}	—	July 11, 2005	Mount Lemmon	Mount Lemmon Survey	·	610 m	MPC · JPL
661783	2005 PC_{7}	—	July 4, 2005	Palomar	NEAT	·	1.0 km	MPC · JPL
661784	2005 PV_{9}	—	August 4, 2005	Palomar	NEAT	EOS	1.7 km	MPC · JPL
661785	2005 PF_{10}	—	July 29, 2005	Palomar	NEAT	·	600 m	MPC · JPL
661786 Aikman	2005 PJ_{27}	Aikman	August 10, 2005	Mauna Kea	P. A. Wiegert, D. D. Balam	·	1.4 km	MPC · JPL
661787	2005 PZ_{28}	—	August 29, 2005	Kitt Peak	Spacewatch	·	1.9 km	MPC · JPL
661788	2005 PZ_{29}	—	August 6, 2005	Palomar	NEAT	·	2.3 km	MPC · JPL
661789	2005 PU_{31}	—	May 31, 2014	Mount Lemmon	Mount Lemmon Survey	·	1.7 km	MPC · JPL
661790	2005 PW_{31}	—	August 4, 2005	Palomar	NEAT	·	1.1 km	MPC · JPL
661791	2005 PE_{32}	—	August 4, 2005	Palomar	NEAT	EUN	1.0 km	MPC · JPL
661792	2005 QR_{6}	—	July 31, 2005	Palomar	NEAT	·	660 m	MPC · JPL
661793	2005 QC_{9}	—	August 26, 2005	Anderson Mesa	LONEOS	·	910 m	MPC · JPL
661794	2005 QG_{13}	—	July 30, 2005	Palomar	NEAT	·	590 m	MPC · JPL
661795	2005 QW_{14}	—	August 25, 2005	Palomar	NEAT	·	1.6 km	MPC · JPL
661796	2005 QM_{19}	—	August 25, 2005	Campo Imperatore	CINEOS	·	740 m	MPC · JPL
661797	2005 QP_{24}	—	August 27, 2005	Kitt Peak	Spacewatch	·	1.8 km	MPC · JPL
661798	2005 QU_{27}	—	August 27, 2005	Kitt Peak	Spacewatch	TIR	2.3 km	MPC · JPL
661799	2005 QQ_{33}	—	August 6, 2005	Palomar	NEAT	H	490 m	MPC · JPL
661800	2005 QH_{34}	—	August 25, 2005	Palomar	NEAT	·	1.9 km	MPC · JPL

== 661801–661900 ==
back to top

Designation			Discovery			Properties		Ref
Permanent	Provisional	Named after	Date	Site	Discoverer(s)	Category	Diam.	Ref
661801	2005 QO_{35}	—	July 31, 2005	Palomar	NEAT	·	1.3 km	MPC · JPL
661802	2005 QQ_{35}	—	August 25, 2005	Palomar	NEAT	·	1.1 km	MPC · JPL
661803	2005 QX_{43}	—	August 28, 2005	Kitt Peak	Spacewatch	·	690 m	MPC · JPL
661804	2005 QC_{64}	—	August 26, 2005	Palomar	NEAT	·	830 m	MPC · JPL
661805	2005 QU_{70}	—	August 29, 2005	Kitt Peak	Spacewatch	·	1.4 km	MPC · JPL
661806	2005 QE_{75}	—	August 25, 2005	Piszkéstető	K. Sárneczky, Szam, D.	·	1.2 km	MPC · JPL
661807	2005 QA_{77}	—	August 30, 2005	Campo Imperatore	CINEOS	·	840 m	MPC · JPL
661808	2005 QQ_{84}	—	August 6, 2005	Palomar	NEAT	·	920 m	MPC · JPL
661809	2005 QF_{93}	—	August 26, 2005	Palomar	NEAT	·	1.0 km	MPC · JPL
661810	2005 QQ_{94}	—	August 30, 2005	Anderson Mesa	LONEOS	·	730 m	MPC · JPL
661811	2005 QE_{97}	—	August 31, 2005	Kitt Peak	Spacewatch	·	2.3 km	MPC · JPL
661812	2005 QN_{97}	—	August 31, 2005	Kitt Peak	Spacewatch	·	1.0 km	MPC · JPL
661813	2005 QQ_{98}	—	July 29, 2005	Palomar	NEAT	·	810 m	MPC · JPL
661814	2005 QL_{104}	—	August 29, 2005	Kitt Peak	Spacewatch	·	2.0 km	MPC · JPL
661815	2005 QB_{106}	—	July 30, 2005	Palomar	NEAT	·	2.5 km	MPC · JPL
661816	2005 QP_{108}	—	August 31, 2005	Kitt Peak	Spacewatch	·	1.9 km	MPC · JPL
661817	2005 QM_{110}	—	August 30, 2005	Kitt Peak	Spacewatch	·	580 m	MPC · JPL
661818	2005 QT_{113}	—	August 30, 2005	Kitt Peak	Spacewatch	·	1.1 km	MPC · JPL
661819	2005 QS_{119}	—	August 28, 2005	Kitt Peak	Spacewatch	·	1.8 km	MPC · JPL
661820	2005 QQ_{125}	—	August 28, 2005	Kitt Peak	Spacewatch	·	1.0 km	MPC · JPL
661821	2005 QD_{128}	—	August 28, 2005	Kitt Peak	Spacewatch	·	580 m	MPC · JPL
661822	2005 QZ_{131}	—	August 28, 2005	Kitt Peak	Spacewatch	·	2.0 km	MPC · JPL
661823	2005 QJ_{137}	—	August 28, 2005	Kitt Peak	Spacewatch	·	1.2 km	MPC · JPL
661824	2005 QP_{142}	—	August 30, 2005	Costitx	OAM	3:2 · SHU	5.3 km	MPC · JPL
661825	2005 QX_{149}	—	July 3, 2005	Palomar	NEAT	·	610 m	MPC · JPL
661826	2005 QD_{152}	—	August 31, 2005	Piszkéstető	K. Sárneczky, Kuli, Z.	·	2.3 km	MPC · JPL
661827	2005 QR_{152}	—	August 26, 2005	Palomar	NEAT	·	2.2 km	MPC · JPL
661828	2005 QT_{160}	—	August 28, 2005	Kitt Peak	Spacewatch	THM	2.0 km	MPC · JPL
661829	2005 QC_{162}	—	July 29, 2005	Palomar	NEAT	·	2.6 km	MPC · JPL
661830	2005 QC_{163}	—	August 30, 2005	Palomar	NEAT	·	2.4 km	MPC · JPL
661831	2005 QA_{164}	—	July 28, 2005	Palomar	NEAT	·	820 m	MPC · JPL
661832	2005 QJ_{164}	—	September 3, 2005	Palomar	NEAT	·	2.3 km	MPC · JPL
661833	2005 QY_{168}	—	August 30, 2005	Palomar	NEAT	·	2.4 km	MPC · JPL
661834	2005 QA_{169}	—	August 30, 2005	Palomar	NEAT	615	1.5 km	MPC · JPL
661835	2005 QW_{186}	—	August 26, 2005	Palomar	NEAT	·	1.3 km	MPC · JPL
661836	2005 QQ_{187}	—	August 31, 2005	Kitt Peak	Spacewatch	(5)	1 km	MPC · JPL
661837	2005 QN_{190}	—	August 26, 2005	Anderson Mesa	LONEOS	(1547)	1.2 km	MPC · JPL
661838	2005 QC_{191}	—	August 29, 2005	Piszkéstető	K. Sárneczky	·	1.4 km	MPC · JPL
661839	2005 QH_{191}	—	August 27, 2005	Anderson Mesa	LONEOS	·	540 m	MPC · JPL
661840	2005 QJ_{191}	—	May 22, 2001	Cerro Tololo	Deep Ecliptic Survey	·	830 m	MPC · JPL
661841	2005 QR_{191}	—	August 31, 2005	Kitt Peak	Spacewatch	·	660 m	MPC · JPL
661842	2005 QJ_{192}	—	August 31, 2005	Kitt Peak	Spacewatch	·	1.8 km	MPC · JPL
661843	2005 QL_{192}	—	November 25, 2011	Haleakala	Pan-STARRS 1	·	2.0 km	MPC · JPL
661844	2005 QQ_{192}	—	August 30, 2005	Kitt Peak	Spacewatch	·	2.0 km	MPC · JPL
661845	2005 QU_{192}	—	February 28, 2014	Haleakala	Pan-STARRS 1	·	760 m	MPC · JPL
661846	2005 QV_{192}	—	August 24, 2005	Palomar	NEAT	·	2.4 km	MPC · JPL
661847	2005 QN_{194}	—	August 30, 2005	Kitt Peak	Spacewatch	·	600 m	MPC · JPL
661848	2005 QQ_{194}	—	January 11, 2008	Kitt Peak	Spacewatch	·	2.0 km	MPC · JPL
661849	2005 QU_{194}	—	September 25, 2016	Mount Lemmon	Mount Lemmon Survey	·	2.1 km	MPC · JPL
661850	2005 QV_{194}	—	April 13, 2013	Haleakala	Pan-STARRS 1	·	1.1 km	MPC · JPL
661851	2005 QF_{195}	—	August 31, 2013	Haleakala	Pan-STARRS 1	·	1.0 km	MPC · JPL
661852	2005 QL_{195}	—	January 19, 2012	Haleakala	Pan-STARRS 1	H	460 m	MPC · JPL
661853	2005 QR_{196}	—	August 31, 2005	Kitt Peak	Spacewatch	·	870 m	MPC · JPL
661854	2005 QU_{198}	—	August 29, 2005	Palomar	NEAT	·	570 m	MPC · JPL
661855	2005 QZ_{198}	—	February 28, 2014	Haleakala	Pan-STARRS 1	·	540 m	MPC · JPL
661856	2005 QO_{199}	—	January 13, 2011	Mount Lemmon	Mount Lemmon Survey	·	1.1 km	MPC · JPL
661857	2005 QH_{202}	—	August 30, 2005	Kitt Peak	Spacewatch	3:2	3.8 km	MPC · JPL
661858	2005 QV_{202}	—	September 25, 2005	Kitt Peak	Spacewatch	·	1.8 km	MPC · JPL
661859	2005 QL_{204}	—	August 30, 2005	Kitt Peak	Spacewatch	·	1.9 km	MPC · JPL
661860	2005 QT_{204}	—	August 27, 2005	Kitt Peak	Spacewatch	MAR	780 m	MPC · JPL
661861	2005 QL_{207}	—	August 26, 2005	Palomar	NEAT	KON	1.9 km	MPC · JPL
661862	2005 QN_{207}	—	August 27, 2005	Kitt Peak	Spacewatch	MAR	810 m	MPC · JPL
661863	2005 QS_{208}	—	August 28, 2005	Kitt Peak	Spacewatch	·	920 m	MPC · JPL
661864	2005 QX_{209}	—	August 31, 2005	Kitt Peak	Spacewatch	·	920 m	MPC · JPL
661865	2005 QH_{210}	—	August 31, 2005	Palomar	NEAT	·	1.5 km	MPC · JPL
661866	2005 RJ_{6}	—	August 30, 2005	Palomar	NEAT	·	880 m	MPC · JPL
661867	2005 RE_{7}	—	August 26, 2005	Anderson Mesa	LONEOS	·	1.3 km	MPC · JPL
661868	2005 RS_{9}	—	September 4, 2005	Pla D'Arguines	R. Ferrando, Ferrando, M.	·	520 m	MPC · JPL
661869	2005 RJ_{19}	—	September 1, 2005	Kitt Peak	Spacewatch	·	2.0 km	MPC · JPL
661870	2005 RF_{22}	—	August 25, 2005	Palomar	NEAT	·	680 m	MPC · JPL
661871	2005 RR_{29}	—	September 3, 2005	Catalina	CSS	·	980 m	MPC · JPL
661872	2005 RH_{31}	—	July 31, 2005	Palomar	NEAT	·	610 m	MPC · JPL
661873	2005 RJ_{35}	—	September 3, 2005	Mauna Kea	Veillet, C.	·	2.6 km	MPC · JPL
661874	2005 RQ_{46}	—	September 27, 2005	Apache Point	SDSS Collaboration	EOS	1.9 km	MPC · JPL
661875	2005 RW_{52}	—	February 29, 2008	Kitt Peak	Spacewatch	EOS	1.9 km	MPC · JPL
661876	2005 RO_{54}	—	September 1, 2005	Kitt Peak	Spacewatch	·	2.0 km	MPC · JPL
661877	2005 RJ_{55}	—	February 1, 2013	Mount Lemmon	Mount Lemmon Survey	·	2.5 km	MPC · JPL
661878	2005 RA_{57}	—	January 30, 2016	Mount Lemmon	Mount Lemmon Survey	·	1.6 km	MPC · JPL
661879	2005 RR_{57}	—	May 27, 2009	Mount Lemmon	Mount Lemmon Survey	(5)	1.1 km	MPC · JPL
661880	2005 RY_{57}	—	September 14, 2005	Kitt Peak	Spacewatch	EUN	1.1 km	MPC · JPL
661881	2005 RJ_{58}	—	March 7, 2008	Mount Lemmon	Mount Lemmon Survey	EOS	1.7 km	MPC · JPL
661882	2005 RA_{59}	—	January 10, 2013	Haleakala	Pan-STARRS 1	·	1.5 km	MPC · JPL
661883	2005 RF_{59}	—	September 1, 2005	Kitt Peak	Spacewatch	·	580 m	MPC · JPL
661884	2005 RC_{60}	—	September 13, 2005	Kitt Peak	Spacewatch	·	1.0 km	MPC · JPL
661885	2005 RF_{62}	—	September 14, 2005	Kitt Peak	Spacewatch	EOS	1.4 km	MPC · JPL
661886	2005 RN_{62}	—	September 13, 2005	Kitt Peak	Spacewatch	·	1.7 km	MPC · JPL
661887	2005 SB	—	August 30, 2005	Palomar	NEAT	·	630 m	MPC · JPL
661888	2005 SN_{1}	—	August 30, 2005	Palomar	NEAT	·	2.5 km	MPC · JPL
661889	2005 SG_{18}	—	September 26, 2005	Kitt Peak	Spacewatch	·	1.0 km	MPC · JPL
661890	2005 SW_{19}	—	September 1, 2005	Campo Imperatore	CINEOS	·	1.2 km	MPC · JPL
661891	2005 SN_{20}	—	September 24, 2005	Kitt Peak	Spacewatch	·	1.2 km	MPC · JPL
661892	2005 SK_{21}	—	September 26, 2005	Kitt Peak	Spacewatch	·	2.3 km	MPC · JPL
661893	2005 SK_{27}	—	September 23, 2005	Kitt Peak	Spacewatch	·	610 m	MPC · JPL
661894	2005 SS_{37}	—	September 24, 2005	Kitt Peak	Spacewatch	·	610 m	MPC · JPL
661895	2005 SG_{38}	—	September 23, 2005	Catalina	CSS	·	700 m	MPC · JPL
661896	2005 SR_{43}	—	September 24, 2005	Kitt Peak	Spacewatch	·	1.1 km	MPC · JPL
661897	2005 SZ_{44}	—	September 24, 2005	Kitt Peak	Spacewatch	·	1.1 km	MPC · JPL
661898	2005 SG_{58}	—	September 26, 2005	Palomar	NEAT	·	3.3 km	MPC · JPL
661899	2005 SP_{65}	—	August 29, 2005	Palomar	NEAT	·	1.2 km	MPC · JPL
661900	2005 SG_{66}	—	September 26, 2005	Palomar	NEAT	·	530 m	MPC · JPL

== 661901–662000 ==
back to top

Designation			Discovery			Properties		Ref
Permanent	Provisional	Named after	Date	Site	Discoverer(s)	Category	Diam.	Ref
661901	2005 SL_{66}	—	September 10, 2005	Anderson Mesa	LONEOS	(1547)	1.2 km	MPC · JPL
661902	2005 SL_{71}	—	September 23, 2005	Kitt Peak	Spacewatch	3:2	4.2 km	MPC · JPL
661903	2005 SV_{72}	—	September 23, 2005	Kitt Peak	Spacewatch	·	690 m	MPC · JPL
661904	2005 SK_{81}	—	September 24, 2005	Kitt Peak	Spacewatch	·	2.0 km	MPC · JPL
661905	2005 SN_{100}	—	September 25, 2005	Kitt Peak	Spacewatch	·	1.2 km	MPC · JPL
661906	2005 SA_{101}	—	September 25, 2005	Kitt Peak	Spacewatch	·	680 m	MPC · JPL
661907	2005 SP_{122}	—	September 29, 2005	Goodricke-Pigott	R. A. Tucker	·	1.6 km	MPC · JPL
661908	2005 SC_{136}	—	September 24, 2005	Kitt Peak	Spacewatch	·	730 m	MPC · JPL
661909	2005 SO_{139}	—	September 25, 2005	Kitt Peak	Spacewatch	·	1.9 km	MPC · JPL
661910	2005 SD_{140}	—	September 25, 2005	Kitt Peak	Spacewatch	·	730 m	MPC · JPL
661911	2005 SV_{145}	—	September 25, 2005	Kitt Peak	Spacewatch	·	620 m	MPC · JPL
661912	2005 SN_{157}	—	September 26, 2005	Kitt Peak	Spacewatch	MAS	740 m	MPC · JPL
661913	2005 SA_{158}	—	September 26, 2005	Kitt Peak	Spacewatch	EOS	1.7 km	MPC · JPL
661914	2005 SA_{160}	—	August 28, 2005	Kitt Peak	Spacewatch	·	1.4 km	MPC · JPL
661915	2005 SS_{165}	—	August 27, 2005	Palomar	NEAT	·	610 m	MPC · JPL
661916	2005 SV_{170}	—	September 29, 2005	Kitt Peak	Spacewatch	·	660 m	MPC · JPL
661917	2005 ST_{181}	—	September 29, 2005	Kitt Peak	Spacewatch	·	2.5 km	MPC · JPL
661918	2005 SN_{183}	—	September 29, 2005	Kitt Peak	Spacewatch	·	600 m	MPC · JPL
661919	2005 SB_{185}	—	September 29, 2005	Kitt Peak	Spacewatch	EOS	1.6 km	MPC · JPL
661920	2005 SU_{197}	—	September 1, 2005	Kitt Peak	Spacewatch	·	2.0 km	MPC · JPL
661921	2005 SD_{206}	—	September 30, 2005	Anderson Mesa	LONEOS	·	1.2 km	MPC · JPL
661922	2005 SS_{206}	—	September 30, 2005	Mount Lemmon	Mount Lemmon Survey	EOS	1.4 km	MPC · JPL
661923	2005 SQ_{227}	—	September 30, 2005	Kitt Peak	Spacewatch	·	2.1 km	MPC · JPL
661924	2005 SG_{231}	—	September 30, 2005	Mount Lemmon	Mount Lemmon Survey	·	720 m	MPC · JPL
661925	2005 SQ_{233}	—	September 30, 2005	Mount Lemmon	Mount Lemmon Survey	·	1 km	MPC · JPL
661926	2005 SS_{235}	—	September 29, 2005	Kitt Peak	Spacewatch	V	410 m	MPC · JPL
661927	2005 SE_{240}	—	September 30, 2005	Kitt Peak	Spacewatch	·	710 m	MPC · JPL
661928	2005 SP_{240}	—	September 30, 2005	Kitt Peak	Spacewatch	·	2.0 km	MPC · JPL
661929	2005 SC_{241}	—	September 30, 2005	Kitt Peak	Spacewatch	·	560 m	MPC · JPL
661930	2005 SE_{242}	—	September 30, 2005	Kitt Peak	Spacewatch	·	2.0 km	MPC · JPL
661931	2005 SK_{250}	—	August 27, 2005	Palomar	NEAT	·	610 m	MPC · JPL
661932	2005 SW_{251}	—	September 26, 2005	Catalina	CSS	·	1.3 km	MPC · JPL
661933	2005 SA_{256}	—	September 23, 2005	Catalina	CSS	·	2.3 km	MPC · JPL
661934	2005 SR_{282}	—	October 9, 2005	Kitt Peak	Spacewatch	·	1.7 km	MPC · JPL
661935	2005 SM_{283}	—	September 27, 2005	Apache Point	SDSS Collaboration	·	2.6 km	MPC · JPL
661936	2005 SA_{285}	—	September 3, 2005	Apache Point	SDSS Collaboration	·	2.2 km	MPC · JPL
661937	2005 SP_{285}	—	October 1, 2005	Apache Point	SDSS Collaboration	·	1.0 km	MPC · JPL
661938	2005 SR_{287}	—	October 1, 2005	Apache Point	SDSS Collaboration	EOS	1.6 km	MPC · JPL
661939	2005 SC_{288}	—	February 22, 2007	Kitt Peak	Spacewatch	·	1.4 km	MPC · JPL
661940	2005 SE_{288}	—	October 1, 2005	Apache Point	SDSS Collaboration	·	2.2 km	MPC · JPL
661941	2005 SE_{289}	—	October 1, 2005	Catalina	CSS	·	2.7 km	MPC · JPL
661942	2005 SX_{290}	—	September 23, 2005	Kitt Peak	Spacewatch	·	2.2 km	MPC · JPL
661943	2005 SY_{291}	—	September 27, 2005	Kitt Peak	Spacewatch	·	1.4 km	MPC · JPL
661944	2005 SH_{292}	—	September 29, 2005	Mount Lemmon	Mount Lemmon Survey	THM	1.9 km	MPC · JPL
661945	2005 SJ_{294}	—	September 29, 2005	Mount Lemmon	Mount Lemmon Survey	·	450 m	MPC · JPL
661946	2005 SL_{294}	—	September 29, 2005	Catalina	CSS	·	1.3 km	MPC · JPL
661947	2005 SY_{294}	—	September 30, 2005	Mount Lemmon	Mount Lemmon Survey	·	1.3 km	MPC · JPL
661948	2005 SZ_{294}	—	September 25, 2005	Kitt Peak	Spacewatch	·	570 m	MPC · JPL
661949	2005 SM_{295}	—	September 24, 2005	Kitt Peak	Spacewatch	EUN	1.1 km	MPC · JPL
661950	2005 SS_{295}	—	July 10, 2016	Mount Lemmon	Mount Lemmon Survey	·	3.3 km	MPC · JPL
661951	2005 SA_{296}	—	September 30, 2005	Mauna Kea	A. Boattini	·	680 m	MPC · JPL
661952	2005 SD_{296}	—	August 6, 2016	Haleakala	Pan-STARRS 1	·	2.6 km	MPC · JPL
661953	2005 SK_{300}	—	September 29, 2005	Mount Lemmon	Mount Lemmon Survey	·	2.5 km	MPC · JPL
661954	2005 SN_{300}	—	September 29, 2005	Mount Lemmon	Mount Lemmon Survey	EOS	1.3 km	MPC · JPL
661955	2005 SE_{301}	—	September 23, 2005	Kitt Peak	Spacewatch	·	2.0 km	MPC · JPL
661956	2005 ST_{302}	—	January 29, 2016	Haleakala	Pan-STARRS 1	·	1.4 km	MPC · JPL
661957	2005 SO_{303}	—	September 29, 2005	Kitt Peak	Spacewatch	·	2.0 km	MPC · JPL
661958	2005 SB_{304}	—	September 29, 2005	Kitt Peak	Spacewatch	·	790 m	MPC · JPL
661959	2005 TG_{9}	—	September 23, 2005	Kitt Peak	Spacewatch	·	590 m	MPC · JPL
661960	2005 TZ_{26}	—	October 1, 2005	Mount Lemmon	Mount Lemmon Survey	·	1.0 km	MPC · JPL
661961	2005 TS_{30}	—	August 29, 2005	Kitt Peak	Spacewatch	·	530 m	MPC · JPL
661962	2005 TH_{36}	—	October 1, 2005	Mount Lemmon	Mount Lemmon Survey	·	950 m	MPC · JPL
661963	2005 TH_{37}	—	October 1, 2005	Mount Lemmon	Mount Lemmon Survey	·	1.5 km	MPC · JPL
661964	2005 TX_{43}	—	August 30, 2005	Palomar	NEAT	·	670 m	MPC · JPL
661965	2005 TY_{44}	—	September 23, 2005	Kitt Peak	Spacewatch	·	1.7 km	MPC · JPL
661966	2005 TM_{47}	—	October 5, 2005	Hereford Arizona	B. Gary	·	1.2 km	MPC · JPL
661967	2005 TU_{49}	—	October 9, 2005	Goodricke-Pigott	R. A. Tucker	·	640 m	MPC · JPL
661968	2005 TA_{50}	—	September 30, 2005	Catalina	CSS	PHO	810 m	MPC · JPL
661969	2005 TQ_{52}	—	September 30, 2005	Mount Lemmon	Mount Lemmon Survey	·	1.6 km	MPC · JPL
661970	2005 TO_{57}	—	October 1, 2005	Mount Lemmon	Mount Lemmon Survey	LIX	2.9 km	MPC · JPL
661971	2005 TA_{62}	—	October 4, 2005	Mount Lemmon	Mount Lemmon Survey	THM	1.9 km	MPC · JPL
661972	2005 TH_{71}	—	October 7, 2005	Mount Lemmon	Mount Lemmon Survey	EOS	1.5 km	MPC · JPL
661973	2005 TB_{80}	—	September 30, 2005	Mount Lemmon	Mount Lemmon Survey	·	1.3 km	MPC · JPL
661974	2005 TG_{89}	—	August 30, 2005	Kitt Peak	Spacewatch	·	1.8 km	MPC · JPL
661975	2005 TN_{95}	—	October 6, 2005	Kitt Peak	Spacewatch	·	810 m	MPC · JPL
661976	2005 TC_{96}	—	October 6, 2005	Mount Lemmon	Mount Lemmon Survey	·	1.2 km	MPC · JPL
661977	2005 TR_{98}	—	September 29, 2005	Kitt Peak	Spacewatch	·	2.2 km	MPC · JPL
661978	2005 TT_{102}	—	September 29, 2005	Kitt Peak	Spacewatch	KOR	1.3 km	MPC · JPL
661979	2005 TD_{107}	—	October 4, 2005	Mount Lemmon	Mount Lemmon Survey	·	2.4 km	MPC · JPL
661980	2005 TJ_{107}	—	October 1, 2005	Mount Lemmon	Mount Lemmon Survey	THM	1.4 km	MPC · JPL
661981	2005 TK_{109}	—	October 7, 2005	Kitt Peak	Spacewatch	EOS	1.5 km	MPC · JPL
661982	2005 TZ_{110}	—	October 7, 2005	Mount Lemmon	Mount Lemmon Survey	·	570 m	MPC · JPL
661983	2005 TK_{112}	—	September 27, 2005	Kitt Peak	Spacewatch	·	1.1 km	MPC · JPL
661984	2005 TY_{117}	—	October 7, 2005	Kitt Peak	Spacewatch	HNS	940 m	MPC · JPL
661985	2005 TK_{119}	—	October 7, 2005	Kitt Peak	Spacewatch	ADE	2.1 km	MPC · JPL
661986	2005 TK_{131}	—	October 7, 2005	Kitt Peak	Spacewatch	·	530 m	MPC · JPL
661987	2005 TV_{143}	—	October 8, 2005	Kitt Peak	Spacewatch	·	2.8 km	MPC · JPL
661988	2005 TO_{146}	—	September 29, 2005	Kitt Peak	Spacewatch	·	1.0 km	MPC · JPL
661989	2005 TP_{146}	—	October 8, 2005	Kitt Peak	Spacewatch	EOS	1.7 km	MPC · JPL
661990	2005 TB_{159}	—	October 9, 2005	Kitt Peak	Spacewatch	·	560 m	MPC · JPL
661991	2005 TO_{170}	—	September 27, 2005	Kitt Peak	Spacewatch	·	1.7 km	MPC · JPL
661992	2005 TQ_{181}	—	October 1, 2005	Mount Lemmon	Mount Lemmon Survey	·	620 m	MPC · JPL
661993	2005 TB_{187}	—	October 5, 2005	Kitt Peak	Spacewatch	·	610 m	MPC · JPL
661994	2005 TJ_{198}	—	October 7, 2005	Mauna Kea	A. Boattini	L5	7.3 km	MPC · JPL
661995	2005 TW_{199}	—	October 10, 2005	Catalina	CSS	·	790 m	MPC · JPL
661996	2005 TX_{202}	—	October 3, 2005	Catalina	CSS	·	2.5 km	MPC · JPL
661997	2005 TB_{204}	—	September 15, 2009	Kitt Peak	Spacewatch	EUN	550 m	MPC · JPL
661998	2005 TJ_{205}	—	September 23, 2012	Kitt Peak	Spacewatch	·	520 m	MPC · JPL
661999	2005 TU_{205}	—	October 12, 2005	Kitt Peak	Spacewatch	·	950 m	MPC · JPL
662000	2005 TB_{206}	—	January 3, 2017	Haleakala	Pan-STARRS 1	·	500 m	MPC · JPL

back to top

== Meaning of names ==
As minor planet discoveries are confirmed, they are given a permanent number by the IAU's Minor Planet Center (MPC), and the discoverers can then submit names for them, following the IAU's naming conventions. The list below concerns those minor planets in the specified number-range that have received names, and explains the meanings of those names.

Official naming citations of newly named small Solar System bodies are approved and published in a bulletin by IAU's Working Group for Small Bodies Nomenclature (WGSBN). Before May 2021, citations were published in MPC's Minor Planet Circulars for many decades. Recent citations can also be found on the JPL Small-Body Database (SBDB). Until his death in 2016, German astronomer Lutz D. Schmadel compiled these citations into the Dictionary of Minor Planet Names (DMP) and regularly updated the collection.

Based on Paul Herget's The Names of the Minor Planets, Schmadel also researched the unclear origin of numerous asteroids, most of which had been named prior to World War II. This article incorporates text from this source, which is in the public domain: SBDB New namings may only be added to this list below after official publication as the preannouncement of names is condemned. The WGSBN publishes a comprehensive guideline for the naming rules of non-cometary small Solar System bodies.

Named minor planet	Provisional	This minor planet was named for...	Ref · Catalog
661178 Żywiecmed	2003 WD_{205}	The Hospital in Żywiec, Żywiec County, Poland.	IAU · 661178
661666 Chenchengpo	2005 EW_{228}	Tan Teng-pho (1895–1947), one of the most iconic figures in Taiwanese art history.	IAU · 661666
661786 Aikman	2005 PJ_{27}	Christopher Aikman, Canadian astrophysicist formerly of the Dominion Astrophysical Observatory of the National Research Council of Canada.	IAU · 661786
