= Chiayi Park (painting) =

Oil painting by Tan Teng-pho

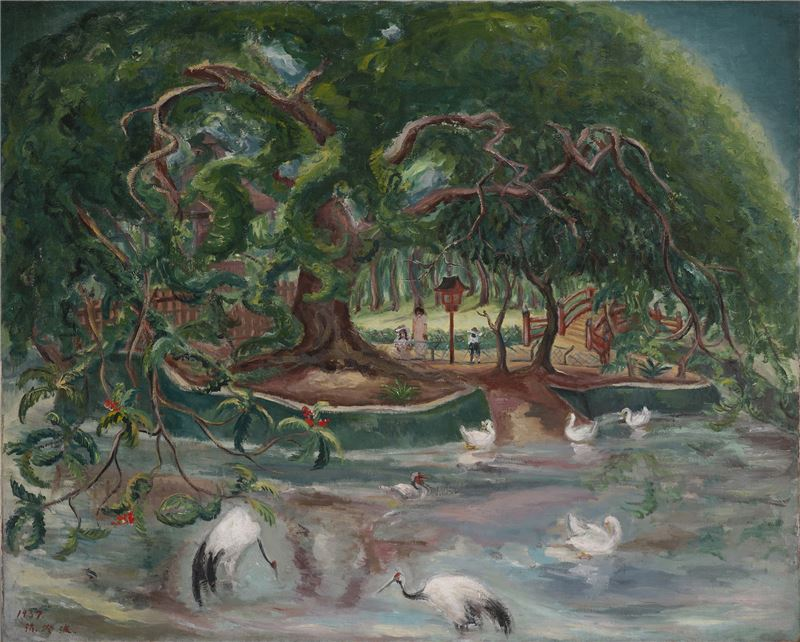

Chiayi Park is an oil painting completed by Taiwanese painter Tan Teng-pho in 1937. This piece depicts the landscape of Chiayi City Chiayi Park. The original work is now in the National Taiwan Museum of Fine Arts collection. It has been registered as an important antiquity of the Republic of China^{,} and it is a renowned modern painting in Taiwan.

== History ==
In 1933, Tan Teng-pho returned to Taiwan and formed the “Tai-Yang Art Association” with eight painters, including Yang San-lang, Lee Shih-chiao, Yen Shui-long, and Li Mei-shu. The association devoted itself to representing scenic spots on canvas; it was an important period when these artists were in a stable, mature stage of their careers. During this period, Chiayi City became one of the themes in Tan Teng-pho's work. Tan Teng-pho included Chiayi Park in many of his sketches and paintings, among which Chiayi Park is the most representative and largest in size in the series work.

In April 1938, Chiayi Park was exhibited at the 4th Taiyang Art Exhibition held at the Taiwan Education Association Building, with the title of the painting “Ben Tien Chi”. Chiayi Park became one of the pieces of the National Taiwan Museum of Fine Arts collections in 1988. Moreover, this painting was exhibited for the first time after about half a century at the “Tan Teng-pho Centennial Exhibition” held at the Chiayi Municipal Culture Center in 1994.

On May 7, 2015, Chiayi Park and Tamsui Landscape (Tamsui) were registered as important antiquities of the Republic of China by the Bureau of Cultural Heritage, MOC.

== Paintings ==
Chiayi Park is considered the representative work of Tan Teng-pho. Its composition is based on multiple viewing angles. A horizontal viewing angle reveals a distant view and the top viewing angle is used for a closer view. The painting is presented in a way that interlaces the virtual and the real. A Poinciana tree by the pool is the focus of this work. The huge tree canopy covers about two-thirds of the painting, making tourists, red-crowned cranes, muscovy ducks, and swans under the giant tree stand out as prominent features. The branches of the giant tree meander and extend outward from the center to present a vast sense of space, which reveals the symbolic meaning of life. The expressive characteristics of linear rhythm of ink and wash make this painting a significant work to the history of Taiwanese art. This painting also represents the Ben Tien Tang located inside Chiayi Park, along with the Taiko Bridge of Kagi Shrine, Japanese lanterns, and other facilities.
