= Lin Man-chiu =

Taiwanese writer

Lin Man-chiu (traditional Chinese: 林滿秋; simplified Chinese: 林满秋; pinyin: Lín Mǎnqiū) is a Taiwanese writer of children's literature.

== Awards ==
Lin has won numerous awards for her books, including:

- 2014 - her novel The Ventriloquist’s Daughter, was long-listed for the 2014 Found in Translation Award and subsequently selected for the Found in Translation Anthology
- 2010 - “Good Books Everyone Can Read” Award for the best children's book of 2010
- 2003 - Golden Tripod Award for children’s fiction - for 《尋找尼可西》[Looking for Nixi]

== Selected publications ==
[The translated titles are approximate]

- 《腹语师的女儿》 - The Ventriloquist's Daughter, translated into English by Helen Wang (Balestier Press, 2017)
- 《戴帽子的女孩》 - The Girl in the Hat (a picture book using the paintings of Tan Ting-pho 陳澄波 (1895-1947), a Taiwanese artist killed while attempting to resolve conflict during the February 28 Incident)
- 《古书里的宝藏》 - Treasures in Old Books, illustrated by Chen Weiping 陈卫平
- 《尋找尼可西》[Looking for Nixi]
- Siraya Boy, illustrated by Zhang You-Ran, translated by Michael Heckfield (Children's publications Co., 2008)
