= Chen Cheng-po =

Taiwanese artist (1895–1947)

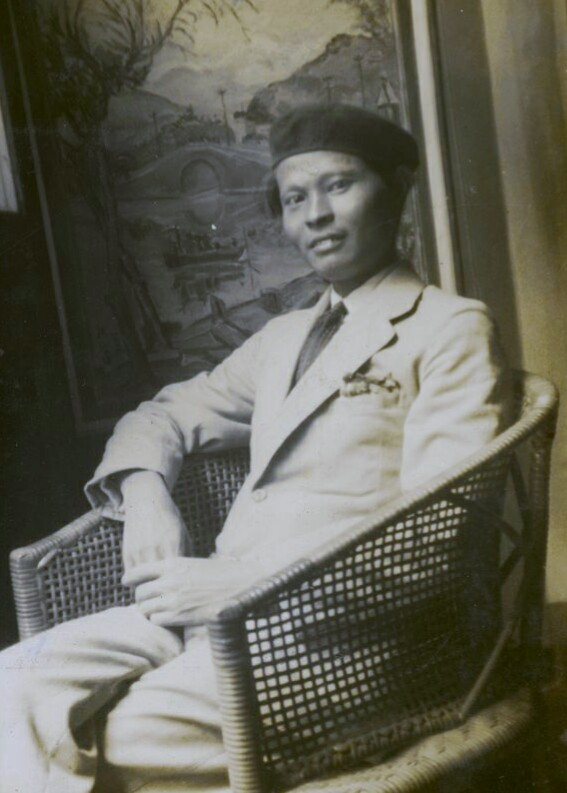
- Born: 2 February 1895; Kagi District, Tainan Prefecture, Fujian-Taiwan Province, Qing dynasty
- Died: March 25, 1947 (aged 52); Chiayi, Taiwan
- Education: Taiwan Governor-General's National Language School, Tokyo School of Fine Arts, Hongo Painting Institute
- Occupations: Painter, politician
- Known for: Founder of Chi-Hsing Painting Society, Tai-Yang Art Society, Chih-Yang Western Painting Society
- Notable work: Street of Chiayi (嘉義の町中; alt. 嘉義街外)
- Television: Is a character in La Grande Chaumiere Violette 紫色大稻埕 (2016 TV series)
- Awards: Outside Chiayi Street selected for the 7th Imperial Art Exhibition, the first time a Taiwanese artist's work could be displayed at the exhibition.

Chinese name
- Traditional Chinese: 陳澄波
Transcriptions
Standard Mandarin
- Hanyu Pinyin: Chén Chéngbō
- Wade–Giles: Chʻen^{2} Chʻeng^{2}-po^{1}
Southern Min
- Hokkien POJ: Tân Têng-pho

Chen Cheng-po (Chinese: 陳澄波; pinyin: Chén Chéngbō; Wade–Giles: Chʻen^{²} Chʻeng^{²}-po^{¹}; Pe̍h-ōe-jī: Tân Têng-pho; 2 February 1895 – 25 March 1947), was a Taiwanese painter and politician. In 1926, his oil painting Street of Chiayi was featured in the seventh Teiten (Imperial Arts Exhibition) in Japan, which was the first time a Taiwanese artist's work could be displayed at the exhibition. Chen devoted his life to education and creation, and was greatly concerned about the development of humanist culture in Taiwan. He was not only devoted to the improvement of his own painting, but also to the promotion of the aesthetic education of the Taiwanese people. He was killed as a result of the February 28 Incident, a 1947 uprising in Taiwan which was repressed by the Kuomintang (KMT).

== Early life ==
Chen was born in Kagi (now known as Chiayi), a few months before the Japanese colonial period, into a poor family that could not invest in his artist talents. After attending college in Taihoku, he returned to his hometown to work as a teacher, a job he held for seven years. Chen then earned enough money to attend the Tokyo University of the Arts, and graduated in 1929. Upon graduation, he moved to Shanghai for four years, where he taught art. Chen returned to Kagi in 1933, and joined the city's Preparatory Committee to Welcome the National Government in 1945. In 1946, Chen was elected as a member of the Chiayi City Council and joined the Kuomintang.

== Education ==
He enrolled in the Taiwan Governor-General's National Language School (臺灣總督府國語學校) in 1913, where he studied Western-style watercolor painting under Kinichiro Ishikawa. In 1924, he went to mainland Japan to receive formal academic training in art under Japanese oil painter Tanabe Itaru at the Normal Education Division in Painting of the Tokyo School of Fine Arts (today's Tokyo University of the Arts). Chen also studied privately under Japanese luminarist Okada Saburosuke at his Hongō Painting Institute.

== Work and public life ==
After completing his graduate program in 1929, he moved to Shanghai to teach at Xinhua Art College (上海新華藝專) and Changming Art School (上海昌明藝專). During his stay in Shanghai, he was influenced by the traditional Chinese painting of Ni Yunlin and Bada Shanren, and began to develop a distinctive style that fuses the lyrical essence of Chinese landscape painting with Western painting techniques. His work includes oil painting, glue color painting, and sketching while his themes center on landscapes and portraits, mostly inspired by everyday scenes around him.

In 1926, his work Street of Kagi was selected for the 7th Imperial Art Exhibition of Japan (帝展, Teiten), making him the first Taiwanese painter to have an oil painting accepted for the exhibition. His success continued after this initial breakthrough, and his works were selected several times for the Imperial Art Exhibition, Taiwan Art Exhibition (台展, Taiten), and Taiwan Viceroy Art Exhibition (府展, Futen), as well as exhibitions held by Japanese art groups outside the state-run exhibition circle like Kaijusha (槐樹社) and Kofukai (光風). After returning to Taiwan, the focus of his work shifted to the scenery of his hometown, as he showcased the charm of the Taiwanese landscape with plein-air works painted in Tamsui, Kagi and Tainan.

Painter Hsieh Li-fa has described Chen's artistic style as clumsy and awkward, which biographer Ko Tsung-min believed was intentional, comparing Chen's work to Vincent van Gogh and Pablo Picasso's Les Demoiselles d'Avignon.

Besides painting, Chen was also actively involved in Taiwanese art movements. Among other art movement activities, he co-founded the Chi-Hsing Painting Society in 1926, co-founded the Tai-Yang Art Society with Yang Sanlang and Liao Chi-chun in 1934, and helped young artists in Kagi establish the Qingchen Fine Art Association in 1940. His contributions to broadening the influence of art in Taiwan also extended to his service as a Chiayi City Councilor, and as a juror at the first Taiwan Provincial Art Exhibition after the handover of Taiwan in 1945.

Dr. Ioseba Sorlauze and Li collaborated with researchers at Chang Gung Memorial Hospital’s Kaohsiung branch and the Art Center at Cheng Shiu University to use X-ray imaging to analyze the work of Taiwanese modernist painter Chen Cheng-Po. This technique reveals the structural layers beneath a painting’s surface. Of the 74 oil paintings researched, 25 were revealed to have underlying layers. Based on the findings, Chen Cheng-Po is one of Taiwan's most nonconformist painters.

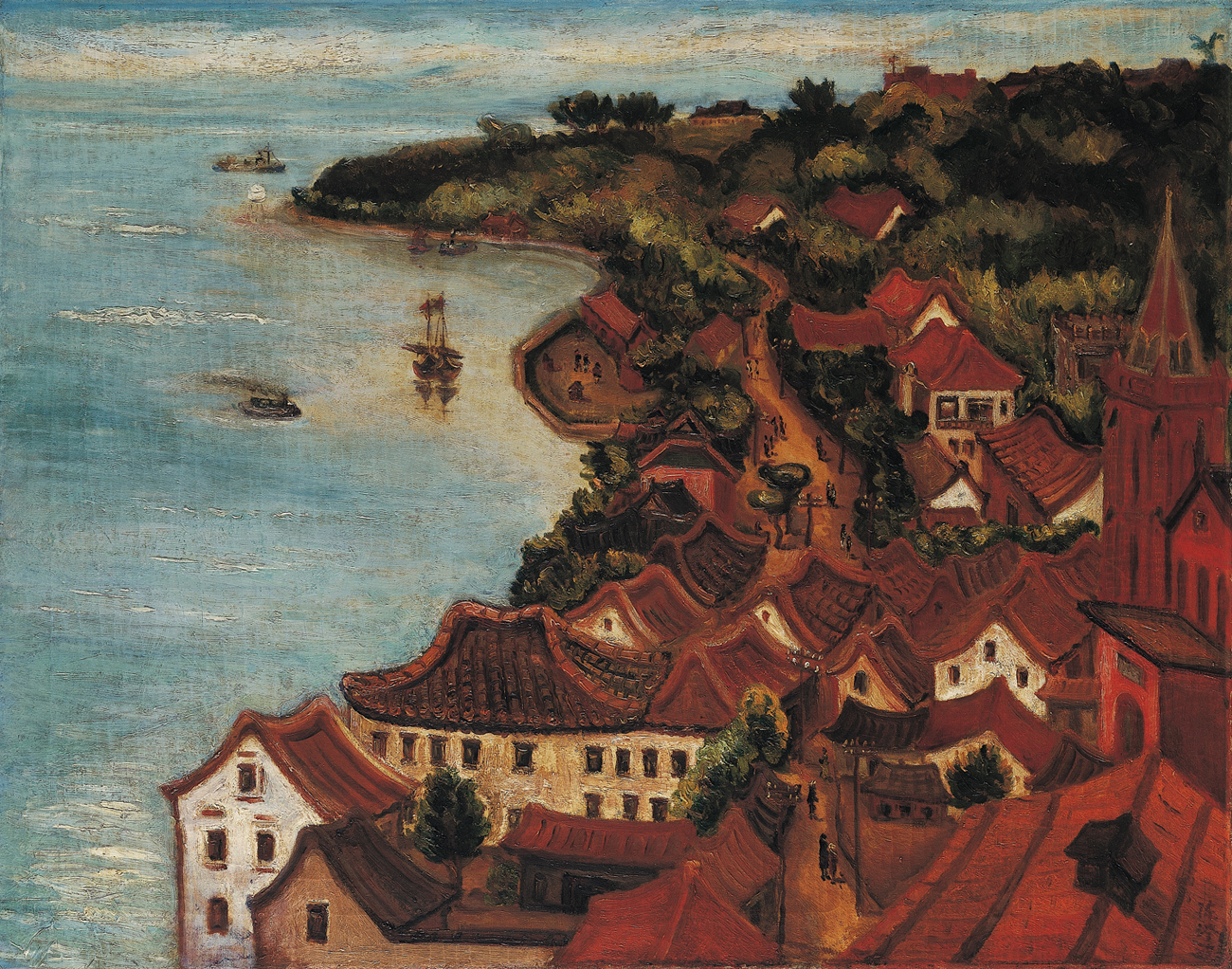
Tamsui Sunset (淡水夕照)

== Death ==
Due to the February 28 Incident, severe conflict occurred in 1947 between Chiayi citizens and the KMT, whose military was trapped inside the city's airport. The "February 28 Incident Committee" was established, composed of Chen and five others who would approach the military as representatives of peace. The military, however, captured four of them, including Chen, and released the remaining two.

On the morning of 25 March 1947, after being tied up with wire, the four were forced to march from the city's police station to the train station, where the other three were shot dead in public. His son, Shigemitsu (陳重光), recalled that as soon as hearing that his arrested father was paraded, he went onto the street and found his father on a military vehicle at Chiayi Fountain. He followed the contingent and realized what would happen when his sight suddenly met his father's.

When the vehicle stopped at Chiayi Station, the army strafed the square in front of the station, with bystanders fleeing in disorder. Chen was the last one pushed off the vehicle. Soldiers shot at him from three meters. The first shot missed but the second penetrated his chest, and Chen fell forward. The Kuomintang forbade the families from collecting the corpses immediately, so Chen's remains were left to decompose on the street for three days, until his wife and a photographer she had hired to take pictures of the aftermath collected them.

== Legacy ==
Chen's work Chiayi Park was sold for $5,794,100 HKD at a Hong Kong auction on 28 April 2002.

Tamsui, an oil painting, was purchased in 2006 for $4.5 million (NT$144 million) by Pierre Chen, setting a world record for an oil painting by an ethnically Chinese artist.

In 2015, a Google Doodle commemorated his 120th birthday.

His paintings form the artwork for Lin Man-chiu's picture book 《戴帽子的女孩》[The Girl in the Hat]

Chen's grandson Pu Hao-ming also became an artist. Pu is known for creating a statue of Tang Kao.

A minor planet was named after Chen in 2025.
