= 1947 in British radio =

This is a list of events from British radio in 1947.

== Events ==
=== January ===
- 2 January – Much-Binding-in-the-Marsh, starring Kenneth Horne and Richard Murdoch, having started out as a recurring sketch in the wartime comedy-variety show Merry-Go-Round (from 31 March 1944), debuts on the BBC Light Programme, continuing in various formats until 1954.

=== February ===
- 21 February – Two issues of Radio Times are missed due to the winter 1946–47 fuel shortage greatly exacerbated by severe weather. (BBC television is suspended 10 February–11 March.)

=== March ===
- 28 February – The UK version of Twenty Questions is launched on BBC radio, originally presented by Stewart MacPherson with a panel comprising Richard Dimbleby, Jack Train, Anona Winn and Joy Adamson and with Norman Hackforth as the mystery voice.

=== April ===
- 9 April – How Does Your Garden Grow? debuts on BBC radio; as Gardeners' Question Time it will still be running more than 65 years later.

=== May ===
- 30 May – The BBC Light Programme broadcasts a special evening of programmes in honour of the eightieth birthday of Queen Mary, including the premiere of Agatha Christie's play Three Blind Mice, later adapted as a television play, short story and the stage play The Mousetrap.

=== June to September ===
- No events.

=== October ===
- 6 October – Philip Odell, a fictional detective created by Lester Powell and played by Canadian actor Robert Beatty, is heard for the first time on BBC radio in Lady in a Fog.
- 24 October – Francis Poulenc's Sinfonietta receives its world premiere in a broadcast concert from London having been commissioned by the BBC for the first anniversary of their Third Programme.

=== November ===
- 18 November – The BBC links up with stations around the globe in the programme BBC Covers the World.
- 20 November – The Princess Elizabeth (later Elizabeth II), daughter of George VI, marries The Duke of Edinburgh at Westminster Abbey, London. The service is broadcast on BBC radio.
- Gracie Fields hosts Our Gracie's Working Party on BBC radio; in the series, she visits twelve towns (beginning with her native Rochdale), compering and performing in a live show of music and entertainment, with local talents on the bill.

=== December ===
- No events.

== Debuts ==
- 28 February – Twenty Questions on the BBC Home Service (1947–1976)
- 9 April – How Does Your Garden Grow? on the BBC Home Service (North Region) (1947–Present)
- 27 October – PC 49 on the BBC Light Programme (1947–1953)
- 2 November – Round Britain Quiz on the BBC Light Programme (1947–Present)

== Programme endings ==
- 26 December – The Happidrome (1941–1947)

== Continuing radio programmes ==
=== 1930s ===
- In Town Tonight (1933–1960)

=== 1940s ===
- Music While You Work (1940–1967)
- Sunday Half Hour (1940–2018)
- Desert Island Discs (1942–Present)
- Family Favourites (1945–1980)
- Down Your Way (1946–1992)
- Have A Go (1946–1967)
- Housewives' Choice (1946–1967)
- Letter from America (1946–2004)
- Woman's Hour (1946–Present)

== Births ==
- 1 March – Mike Read, DJ
- 28 March – Peter Hennessy, constitutional historian and broadcaster
- 29 April – Susie Mathis, pop singer and radio presenter
- 28 June – Gerry Northam, radio presenter
- 10 May – Laurie Macmillan, Scottish-born radio newsreader and continuity announcer (died 2001)
- 20 May – Greg Dyke, journalist and broadcaster, Director-General of the BBC
- 15 September – Mike Sweeney, DJ
- 20 September – Jeremy Nicholas, writer, actor and broadcast presenter
- 5 November – Steve Hodson, actor
- 20 November – Marilyn Imrie, Scottish theatre and radio drama director and producer (died 2020)
- Alistair Beaton, Scottish-born satirist, scriptwriter and radio presenter
- Natalie Wheen, arts presenter
- Peter White, blind radio presenter

== Deaths ==
- 11 March – Victor Hely-Hutchinson, composer and conductor, BBC Director of Music (born 1901)
- 24 July – Ernest Austin, composer, arranger and songwriter associated with the Proms (born 1874)

== See also ==
- 1947 in British music
- 1947 in British television
- 1947 in the United Kingdom
- List of British films of 1947
