= Operation Blackcurrant =

Royal Navy operation to supply power from submarines in the winter of 1947

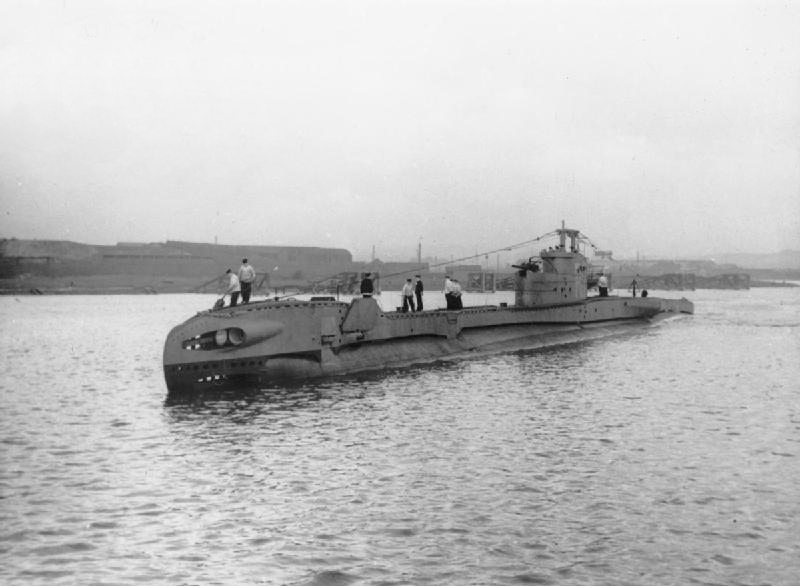
- HMS Truculent (shown in 1942)
- Objective: Generate electricity to supplement the National Grid during a power shortage
- Date: Winter of 1947
- Executed by: Royal Navy Submarine Service

Operation Blackcurrant was a Royal Navy peacetime operation carried out January to February 1947 to provide electrical power during a power shortage.

A combination of low coal stockpiles and the effects of the cold weather on the transport network led to a shortage of fuel reaching power stations, forcing many to shut down or reduce their outputs. The Royal Navy responded by authorising the Submarine Service to moor submarines at harbours and docks and use their onboard diesel generators to provide supplementary power to dockyards and coastal towns. By February conditions had improved and power stations began to receive sufficient supplies of fuel.

== Background ==
The United Kingdom was subjected to a period of cold temperatures and heavy snowfall that began in late January 1947 and would last into March. During this period the country also suffered from a shortage of coal, the principal fuel used in power stations at the time. This was partly due to low stocks of coal being kept in the aftermath of the Second World War but was also caused by the government relying on over optimistic production reports issued by the National Union of Mineworkers.

The cold weather caused a higher-than-normal demand for coal and power as the country's residents tried to keep warm. At the same time it became more difficult for coal to reach the power stations as it was frozen solid in stockpiles. Where coal was available it was hard to transport with many roads impassable, 750,000 railway waggons of coal trapped by snow and sea conditions too rough to allow transport by collier. As a result many power stations were forced to shut down or reduce their output due to a lack of fuel. In an effort to reduce electricity consumption the Minister of Fuel and Power, Emanuel Shinwell cut electricity supply to industry completely and reduced the domestic supply to 19 hours per day across the country. Television services were suspended completely, radio broadcasts were reduced, some magazines were ordered to stop being published and newspapers were cut in size to four pages.

== The operation ==
Despite Shinwell's measures the fuel supply remained insufficient and blackouts occurred across large swathes of the country with even the staff at Buckingham Palace, the Houses of Parliament and London's Central Electricity Board reduced to working by candlelight. The Royal Navy responded by launching Operation Blackcurrant. The operation saw the deployment of all available submarines to ports and docks where they were moored up and their on-board diesel-powered generators used as an electricity supply. The operation was used to supply power to the navy-owned bases of Devonport Dockyard, Plymouth and Chatham Dockyard, Kent. As part of the operation the T-class submarine HMS Truculent was deployed to Brighton to provide power to the town. The job was uncomfortable for the submarine crews involved as it required them to work in cold and draughty conditions as the submarines' diesel engines required a constant flow of air. By 27 February sea conditions had improved and more than 100 coal ships had managed to unload their cargoes at the power stations, easing the fuel crisis.

== Bibliography ==
- Burroughs, William James (1997), Does the Weather Really Matter?, Cambridge: Cambridge University Press, ISBN 0-521-56126-4
- Marr, Andrew (2007), A History of Modern Britain, Pan, ISBN 978-0-330-43983-1
- Middlemas, Keith (April 1990), "Review of The Bleak Midwinter, 1947", The English Historical Review, 105 (415), JSTOR 571001
