= 1947 in British music =

This is a summary of 1947 in music in the United Kingdom.

== Events ==
- 11–15 June – The first Llangollen International Musical Eisteddfod is held in Wales, with W. S. Gwynn Williams as its musical director.
- 19 June – Kathleen Ferrier appears at Glyndebourne in Gluck's opera Orfeo ed Euridice.
- July – Conductor Malcolm Sargent is invested with a knighthood for his services to music.
- August – Edmund Rubbra begins work on his Symphony No. 5 in B flat, Op. 63.
- 22 August – The first Edinburgh International Festival opens. Its co-founder and first director is Sir Rudolf Bing. The first Festival concentrates mainly on classical music, a highlight being concerts given by the Vienna Philharmonic, reunited with their erstwhile conductor Bruno Walter, who had left Europe after the Nazi occupation of his homeland.
- 3 November – The Royal Variety Performance, held at the London Palladium and attended by King George VI, includes performances by Bud Flanagan, Wilson, Keppel and Betty, Borrah Minnevitch's Harmonica Rascals, Valerie Tandy and Gracie Fields.
- December – Benjamin Britten and singers Joan Cross and Peter Pears combine with designer John Piper and producer Eric Crozier to found the English Opera Group.
- date unknown
  - Jack Brymer becomes principal clarinettist of the Royal Philharmonic Orchestra.
  - Gracie Fields hosts Our Gracie's Working Party on BBC radio; in the series, she visits twelve towns (beginning with Rochdale), compering and performing in a live show of music and entertainment, with local talents on the bill.

== Popular music ==
- Lizbeth Webb – "This is My Lovely Day" (by Vivian Ellis, from the musical Bless the Bride)

== Classical music: new works ==
- Lennox Berkeley – Piano Concerto in B flat
- Doreen Carwithen (Mary Alwyn) – ODTAA (One Damn Thing After Another)
- Vivian Ellis – Coronation Scot
- Ralph Vaughan Williams – Introduction and Fugue for two pianos

== Opera ==
- Benjamin Britten – Albert Herring

== Film and incidental music ==
- Brian Easdale – Black Narcissus, starring Deborah Kerr and David Farrar.

== Musical theatre ==
- 7 April – Together Again, a London revue starring The Crazy Gang, opens at the Victoria Palace Theatre and runs for 1566 performances.
- 26 April – Bless the Bride (music by Vivian Ellis, book and lyrics by A. P. Herbert), produced by Charles B. Cochran, opens at the Adelphi Theatre and runs for 886 performances. It stars Georges Guétary, Lizbeth Webb, Anona Winn and Brian Reece.
- 7 June – The London production of Annie Get Your Gun (Irving Berlin) opens at the Coliseum and runs for 1304 performances.
- 3 October – Cicely Courtneidge reprises her starring role from the London production of Under the Counter in a Broadway production at the Shubert Theatre, but the show closes after only 27 performances.
- 21 October – The London production of Finian's Rainbow (Burton Lane and E.Y. Harburg) opens at the Palace Theatre and runs for 55 performances.

== Musical films ==
- None

== Births ==
- 6 January – Sandy Denny, folk singer (Fairport Convention) (died 1978)
- 8 January
  - David Bowie, singer-songwriter (died 2016)
  - Terry Sylvester (The Hollies)
- 19 January – Rod Evans, English singer-songwriter (Deep Purple and Captain Beyond)
- 21 January – Pye Hastings, Scottish singer-songwriter and guitarist (Caravan)
- 29 January – David Byron, singer-songwriter (died 1985)
- 30 January – Steve Marriott, vocalist (Small Faces, Humble Pie) (died 1991)
- 2 February – Frank Hennessy, folk singer and radio presenter
- 3 February – Dave Davies, singer-guitarist (The Kinks)
- 26 February – Sandie Shaw, singer
- 5 March – Clodagh Rodgers, singer
- 6 March – Kiki Dee, singer
- 14 March
  - Roy Budd, jazz pianist and composer (died 1993)
  - Peter Skellern, singer-songwriter and pianist (died 2017)
- 24 March – Mike Kellie, musician (died 2017)
- 25 March – Elton John, pianist, singer and songwriter
- 1 April – Robin Scott, singer-songwriter and guitarist
- 3 April – Artie Trezise, Scottish folk guitarist and singer (The Singing Kettle)
- 16 April – Gerry Rafferty, singer-songwriter (died 2011)
- 18 April – Polly Brown, singer
- 23 April – Glenn Cornick, bass guitarist (Jethro Tull)
- 27 April – Pete Ham, singer-songwriter (Badfinger) (died 1975)
- 8 May – Felicity Lott, operatic soprano
- 31 May – Junior Campbell, singer and songwriter
- 1 June – Ronnie Wood, guitarist (The Faces, The Rolling Stones)
- 2 June – Sir Mark Elder, conductor
- 3 June – Mickey Finn (T. Rex) (died 2003)
- 5 June – Tommie Evans (Badfinger) (died 1983)
- 8 June – Julie Driscoll, singer (Brian Auger and the Trinity)
- 17 June – Paul Young, singer-songwriter (Sad Café and Mike + The Mechanics) (died 2000)
- 3 July – Top Topham, guitarist (The Yardbirds)
- 7 July – Rob Townsend, drummer (Family, The Blues Band, The Manfreds, and Axis Point)
- 12 July – Wilko Johnson, pub rock guitarist, singer-songwriter (Dr. Feelgood) and actor (d. 2022)
- 15 July – Peter Banks, guitarist and songwriter (Yes, The Syn and Flash) (d. 2013)
- 19 July – Brian May, guitarist
- 14 August – Maddy Prior, folk singer
- 17 September – Lol Creme, singer (10cc)
- 27 September – Barbara Dickson, singer
- 25 October – Glenn Tipton, rock guitarist
- 5 November – Peter Noone, singer, "Herman" of Herman's Hermits
- 10 November – Greg Lake (Emerson, Lake & Palmer) (died 2016)
- 29 December – Cozy Powell, drummer (died 1998)
- 30 December – Jeff Lynne, singer, songwriter and producer (The Move, Electric Light Orchestra)
- 31 December – Marcus Blunt, composer

== Deaths ==
- 11 March – Victor Hely-Hutchinson, South African-born British composer, 45 (pneumonia)
- 2 May – Louie Henri, singer and actress, 83
- 3 May – Katie Moss, violinist, pianist, singer, and composer of "The Floral Dance", 66
- 30 May – Sir Sydney Nicholson, choir director, organist and composer, 72
- 2 June – Herman Darewski, composer and conductor, 64
- 24 July – Ernest Austin, composer, 72
- 11 September – Walter Galpin Alcock, organist and composer, 85
- 29 October – Theodore Holland, composer, 69
- 14 December – Will Fyffe, comedian and singer, 62 (fell from hotel room window)

== See also ==
- 1947 in British television
- 1947 in the United Kingdom
- List of British films of 1947
