= 1947 in British television =

This is a list of British television related events from 1947.

== Events ==
=== February ===
- 10 February–11 March – The BBC Television Service is temporarily suspended for the first time since World War II due to the Winter 1946–47 UK fuel shortage caused by the severe winter. From 21 February, two issues of the Radio Times, the BBC's listings magazine, are missed for the same cause.

=== November ===
- 9 November – Memorial service broadcast from the Cenotaph on the BBC Television Service, using tele-recording for the first time.
- 20 November – The Princess Elizabeth (later Elizabeth II), daughter of George VI marries The Duke of Edinburgh at Westminster Abbey, London. The procession is watched by an estimated 400,000 viewers and is the oldest surviving telerecorded programme in Britain.

=== Unknown ===
- Adelaide Hall appears in Variety in Sepia, the first telecording by BBC (kinescope) showing black singer Adelaide Hall performing two songs with chorus and her guitar. Copies of this first English kinescope of live TV broadcast are preserved by the BBC.
- Café Continental premieres on the BBC Television Service.

== Debuts ==
- 19 January – Rebecca (1947)
- 4 February – The Happiest Days of Your Life (1947)
- 6 February – The Two Mrs Carrolls (1947)
- 9 February – Cry Havoc (1947)
- 23 March – The Man Who Came To Dinner (1947)
- 11 May – Larry the Lamb (1947)
- 24 June – The Bad Man (1947)
- 27 July – Boys in Brown (1947)
- 3 August – The Amazing Dr. Clitterhouse (1947)
- 16 August – New Faces (1947)
- 31 August – The Green Pack (1947)
- 2 October – Busman's Honeymoon (1947)
- Unknown – Café Continental (1947–1953)

== Continuing television shows ==
=== 1920s ===
- BBC Wimbledon (1927–1939, 1946–2019, 2021–present)

=== 1930s ===
- Picture Page (1936–1939, 1946–1952)
- For the Children (1937–1939, 1946–1952)
- Trooping the Colour (1937–1939, 1946–2019, 2023–present)
- The Boat Race (1938–1939, 1946–2019)
- BBC Cricket (1939, 1946–1999, 2020–2024)

=== 1940s ===
- Kaleidoscope (1946–1953)
- Muffin the Mule (1946–1955, 2005–2006)

== Ending this year ==
- Pinwright's Progress (1946–1947)

== Births ==
- 21 January – Jonathan Meades, journalist and presenter
- 10 February – Nicholas Owen, journalist and newsreader
- 22 February – Deborah Grant, actress
- 28 February – Stephanie Beacham, English actress
- 1 March – Mike Read, television presenter and radio disc jockey
- 11 March – Alan Yentob, television executive (died 2025)
- 26 April – Warren Clarke, actor (died 2014)
- 30 April – Leslie Grantham, actor (EastEnders) (died 2018)
- 20 May – Greg Dyke, journalist and broadcaster, Director-General of the BBC
- 22 May – G. F. Newman, screenwriter and producer
- 6 July – Richard Beckinsale, actor (Porridge, Rising Damp) (died 1979)
- 14 July – Julia Somerville, journalist and newsreader
- 23 July – David Essex, actor and singer (EastEnders)
- 7 August – Nick Ross, radio and television presenter
- 14 September – Joan Thirkettle, journalist and broadcaster (died 1996)
- 16 September – Russ Abbot, actor, comedian and singer
- 28 September – Jon Snow, journalist and news presenter
- 30 September – Rula Lenska, actress
- 1 October – Larry Lamb, actor
- 2 October – Paul Jackson, producer
- 18 October – Paul Chuckle (Elliott), half of children's entertainment comedy double act the Chuckle Brothers
- 1 November – Nick Owen, newsreader and presenter
- 6 November – Jim Rosenthal, sports presenter
- Alistair Beaton, scriptwriter

== See also ==
- 1947 in British music
- 1947 in the United Kingdom
- List of British films of 1947
