= 1947 in film =

The year 1947 in film involved some significant events.

== Events ==
- February 23 – Ealing Studios release the film Hue and Cry, regarded as the first of the UK's famous Ealing Comedies.
- April 19 – Monogram Pictures release their first film under their Allied Artists banner, It Happened on Fifth Avenue.
- May 22 – Great Expectations is premiered in New York.
- August 31 – The first Edinburgh International Film Festival opens at the Playhouse Cinema, presented by the Edinburgh Film Guild as part of the Edinburgh Festival of the Arts. Originally specialising in documentaries, it will become the world's oldest continually running film festival.
- November 24 – The United States House of Representatives of the 80th Congress votes 346 to 17 to approve citations for contempt of Congress against the "Hollywood Ten".
- November 25 – The Waldorf Statement is released by the executives of the United States motion picture industry, marking the beginning of the Hollywood blacklist.

== Awards ==
Category/Organization	5th Golden Globe Awards March 10, 1948	20th Academy Awards March 20, 1948
Best Film	Gentleman's Agreement	
Best Director	Elia Kazan; Gentleman's Agreement	
Best Actor	Ronald Colman; A Double Life	
Best Actress	Rosalind Russell; Mourning Becomes Electra	Loretta Young; The Farmer's Daughter
Best Supporting Actor	Edmund Gwenn; Miracle on 34th Street	
Best Supporting Actress	Celeste Holm; Gentleman's Agreement	
Best Screenplay, Adapted	George Seaton; Miracle on 34th Street	George Seaton; Miracle on 34th Street
Best Screenplay, Original	George Seaton; Miracle on 34th Street	Sidney Sheldon; The Bachelor and the Bobby-Soxer

== Top-grossing films (U.S.) ==
The top ten 1947 released films by box office gross in North America are as follows:

Highest-grossing films of 1947
Rank	Title	Distributor	Domestic rentals
1	Welcome Stranger	Paramount	$6,100,000
2	The Egg and I	Universal	$5,500,000
3	Life with Father	Warner Bros.	$5,057,000
4	Forever Amber	20th Century Fox	$5,000,000
5	Unconquered	Paramount	$4,633,486
6	Road to Rio	Paramount	$4,500,000
7	Green Dolphin Street	MGM	$4,384,380
8	The Bachelor and the Bobby-Soxer	RKO	$4,200,000
9	Mother Wore Tights	20th Century Fox	$4,100,000
10	Cass Timberlane	MGM	$3,983,000

== Notable films released in 1947 ==
United States unless stated

=== # ===
- 13 Rue Madeleine, starring James Cagney

=== A ===
- Admiral Nakhimov – (USSR)
- Along the Songhua River (Songhua-jiang shang) – (China)
- Angel and the Badman, starring John Wayne and Gail Russell

=== B ===
- The Bachelor and the Bobby-Soxer, starring Cary Grant, Shirley Temple, Myrna Loy
- Between Yesterday and Tomorrow, starring Hildegard Knef – (Germany)
- The Big Fix, starring Sheila Ryan
- The Bishop's Wife, starring Cary Grant, Loretta Young, David Niven
- Black Narcissus, written and directed by Michael Powell and Emeric Pressburger, starring Deborah Kerr, Sabu, Jean Simmons – (GB)
- Body and Soul, directed by Robert Rossen, starring John Garfield and Lilli Palmer
- Boomerang, starring Dana Andrews
- Born to Kill, starring Claire Trevor and Lawrence Tierney
- The Brasher Doubloon, starring George Montgomery
- Brute Force, directed by Jules Dassin, starring Burt Lancaster
- Buck Privates Come Home, starring Bud Abbott and Lou Costello
- Bury Me Dead, starring June Lockhart and Hugh Beaumont

=== C ===
- Captain Boycott, directed by Frank Launder, starring Stewart Granger – (GB)
- Captain from Castile, starring Tyrone Power
- Carnegie Hall, starring Marsha Hunt
- Cass Timberlane, starring Spencer Tracy and Lana Turner
- Cinderella (Zolushka) – (U.S.S.R.)
- Copacabana, starring Groucho Marx and Carmen Miranda
- Crossfire, starring Robert Young, Robert Mitchum, Robert Ryan, Gloria Grahame
- Cynthia (film), starring Elizabeth Taylor and George Murphy

=== D ===
- Daisy Kenyon, directed by Otto Preminger, starring Joan Crawford, Henry Fonda, Dana Andrews
- Dancing with Crime, starring Richard Attenborough and Sheila Sim – (GB)
- Dark Passage, starring Humphrey Bogart and Lauren Bacall'
- Dead Reckoning, starring Humphrey Bogart and Lizabeth Scott
- Deep Valley, directed by Jean Negulesco, starring Ida Lupino
- Desert Fury, starring John Hodiak, Burt Lancaster, Lizabeth Scott
- Desperate, directed by Anthony Mann, starring Steve Brodie and Raymond Burr
- Devil in the Flesh (Diable au corps) – (France)
- The Devil Thumbs a Ride, starring Lawrence Tierney
- Dick Tracy Meets Gruesome, starring Boris Karloff and Ralph Byrd
- Driftwood, starring Walter Brennan and Natalie Wood
- A Double Life, starring Ronald Colman and Shelley Winters
- Down to Earth, starring Rita Hayworth and Larry Parks
- Dreams That Money Can Buy, directed by Hans Richter

=== E ===
- The Egg and I, starring Claudette Colbert and Fred MacMurray
- Eight Thousand Li of Cloud and Moon (Ba qian li lu yun he yue) – (China)
- Escape Me Never, starring Ida Lupino, Eleanor Parker, Errol Flynn
- The Exile, directed by Max Ophuls, starring Douglas Fairbanks, Jr. and Maria Montez

=== F ===
- Fame is the Spur, a Boulting Brothers film, with Michael Redgrave – (GB)
- Far Away Love, directed by Chen Liting, starring Zhao Dan and Qin Yi – (China)
- The Farmer's Daughter, starring Loretta Young
- Fear in the Night, starring DeForest Kelley
- Fireworks, directed by Kenneth Anger
- The Flame, starring Vera Ralston and Broderick Crawford
- Flesh Will Surrender (Il delitto di Giovanni Episcopo), starring Aldo Fabrizi – (Italy)
- Forever Amber, starring Linda Darnell
- The Foxes of Harrow, starring Rex Harrison and Maureen O'Hara – (GB/U.S.)
- Framed, starring Glenn Ford
- Frieda, directed by Basil Dearden, starring David Farrar, Glynis Johns, Mai Zetterling – (GB)
- The Fugitive, directed by John Ford, starring Henry Fonda and Dolores del Río
- Fun and Fancy Free, an animated film from Disney and RKO

=== G ===
- The Garcias Return! (¡Vuelven los Garcia!), starring Pedro Infante – (Mexico)
- Gentleman's Agreement, directed by Elia Kazan, starring Gregory Peck, Dorothy McGuire, Celeste Holm, John Garfield
- The Ghost and Mrs. Muir, starring Gene Tierney and Rex Harrison
- Golden Earrings, starring Ray Milland and Marlene Dietrich
- Good News, starring June Allyson and Peter Lawford
- Green Dolphin Street, starring Lana Turner and Donna Reed
- The Guilt of Janet Ames, starring Rosalind Russell
- The Guilty, starring Bonita Granville

=== H ===
- Heaven Only Knows, starring Robert Cummings
- Hi-De-Ho, starring Cab Calloway
- High Barbaree, starring Van Johnson and June Allyson
- High Wall, starring Robert Taylor
- Honeymoon, starring Shirley Temple
- The Hucksters, starring Clark Gable and Deborah Kerr
- Hue and Cry, the first Ealing comedy, directed by Charles Crichton – (GB)
- The Humpbacked Horse (Konyok Gorbunok) – (U.S.S.R.)
- Hungry Hill, starring Margaret Lockwood and Dennis Price – (GB)

=== I ===
- An Ideal Husband, directed by Alexander Korda, starring Michael Wilding and Paulette Goddard – (GB)
- If Winter Comes, starring Deborah Kerr, Walter Pidgeon, Angela Lansbury
- The Imperfect Lady, starring Ray Milland and Teresa Wright
- In Those Days (In jenen Tagen) – (Germany)
- It Always Rains on Sunday, starring Googie Withers and Jack Warner – (GB)
- It Happened in Brooklyn, starring Frank Sinatra, Kathryn Grayson, Peter Lawford, and Jimmy Durante
- It Happened on Fifth Avenue, starring Victor Moore, Don DeFore, Gale Storm, Charlie Ruggles

=== J ===
- Jenny and the Soldier (Soldaten og Jenny) – (Denmark)
- Johnny O'Clock, starring Dick Powell

=== K ===
- Killer Dill, starring Stuart Erwin and Anne Gwynne
- Kiss of Death, starring Victor Mature and Richard Widmark

=== L ===
- The Lady from Shanghai, directed by and starring Orson Welles, with Rita Hayworth
- Lady in the Lake, directed by and starring Robert Montgomery
- Last of the Redskins, starring Michael O'Shea
- The Last Stage (Ostatni etap) – (Poland)
- The Late George Apley, starring Ronald Colman
- Law of the Lash, starring Lash LaRue
- Life with Father, starring William Powell and Elizabeth Taylor
- A Likely Story, starring Barbara Hale and Bill Williams
- Living in a Big Way, starring Gene Kelly and Marie McDonald
- The Long Night, starring Henry Fonda and Barbara Bel Geddes
- Lost Honeymoon, starring Franchot Tone and Ann Richards
- The Lost Moment, starring Robert Cummings and Susan Hayward
- Lost Youth (Gioventù perduta), directed by Pietro Germi – (Italy)
- Love from a Stranger, starring John Hodiak
- Lured, starring George Sanders and Lucille Ball

=== M ===
- The Macomber Affair, starring Gregory Peck and Joan Bennett
- The Man I Love, starring Ida Lupino and Robert Alda
- The Mark of Cain, directed by Brian Desmond Hurst (GB)
- Marriage in the Shadows (Ehe im Schatten) – (East Germany)
- Mine Own Executioner, starring Burgess Meredith – (GB)
- Miracle on 34th Street, starring Edmund Gwenn, John Payne, Maureen O'Hara
- Monsieur Verdoux, directed by and starring Charles Chaplin
- Monsieur Vincent, starring Pierre Fresnay – (France)
- Moss Rose, starring Peggy Cummins and Victor Mature
- Mother Wore Tights, starring Betty Grable
- Mourning Becomes Electra, starring Rosalind Russell and Michael Redgrave
- My Favourite Brunette, starring Bob Hope and Dorothy Lamour
- My Wild Irish Rose, a biopic starring Dennis Morgan (as Chauncey Olcott)

=== N ===
- Neel Kamal (Blue Lotus), first film of Madhubala and Raj Kapoor in adult roles – (India)
- Nicholas Nickleby, directed by Alberto Cavalcanti, starring Stanley Holloway – (GB)
- Nightmare Alley, starring Tyrone Power and Joan Blondell
- Nora Prentiss, starring Ann Sheridan
- The October Man, starring John Mills and Joan Greenwood – (GB)

=== O ===
- Odd Man Out, directed by Carol Reed, starring James Mason and Robert Newton – (GB)
- One Wonderful Sunday (Subarashiki Nichiyōbi), directed by Akira Kurosawa – (Japan)
- L'onorevole Angelina (Parliamentarian Angelina), directed by Luigi Zampa, starring Anna Magnani – (Italy)
- Out of the Blue, starring Virginia Mayo and George Brent
- Out of the Past, directed by Jacques Tourneur, starring Robert Mitchum, Jane Greer and Kirk Douglas

=== P ===
- The Paradine Case, directed by Alfred Hitchcock, starring Gregory Peck, Alida Valli, Ann Todd, Louis Jourdan, Charles Laughton
- The Pearl (La Perla), directed by Emilio Fernández, starring Pedro Armendáriz – (Mexico)
- The Perils of Pauline, starring Betty Hutton
- Pirates of Monterey, starring Rod Cameron and Maria Montez
- Possessed, starring Joan Crawford and Van Heflin
- Pursued, directed by Raoul Walsh, starring Robert Mitchum and Teresa Wright

=== Q ===
- Quai des Orfèvres, directed by Henri-Georges Clouzot, starring Louis Jouvet – (France)

=== R ===
- Railroaded!, directed by Anthony Mann, starring John Ireland and Hugh Beaumont
- Ramrod, starring Joel McCrea and Veronica Lake
- The Record of a Tenement Gentleman (Nagaya shinshiroku), directed by Yasujirō Ozu – (Japan)
- The Red House, starring Edward G. Robinson and Judith Anderson
- Repeat Performance, starring Louis Hayward and Joan Leslie
- Ride the Pink Horse, directed by and starring Robert Montgomery
- Riffraff, starring Pat O'Brien and Anne Jeffreys
- Road to Rio, starring Bing Crosby, Dorothy Lamour, Bob Hope
- The Romance of Rosy Ridge, starring Van Johnson, Thomas Mitchell, Janet Leigh
- The Root of All Evil, starring Phyllis Calvert and Michael Rennie – (GB)
- Roses Are Red, starring Peggy Knudsen

=== S ===
- Scared to Death, starring Bela Lugosi and George Zucco
- School for Postmen (L'École des facteurs), a comedy short directed by and starring Jacques Tati – (France)
- The Sea of Grass, directed by Elia Kazan, starring Katharine Hepburn and Spencer Tracy
- Secret Agent (Podvig razvedchika), directed by Boris Barnet – (U.S.S.R.)
- The Secret Life of Walter Mitty, starring Danny Kaye and Virginia Mayo
- The Senator Was Indiscreet, starring William Powell
- A Ship to India (Skepp till India land), directed by Ingmar Bergman – (Sweden)
- The Shocking Miss Pilgrim, starring Betty Grable
- Sinbad the Sailor, starring Douglas Fairbanks Jr. and Maureen O'Hara
- Smash-Up, the Story of a Woman, starring Susan Hayward
- Snow Trail (Ginrei no hate), starring Toshiro Mifune – (Japan)
- So Well Remembered, directed by Edward Dmytryk, starring John Mills and Martha Scott – (GB)
- Something in the Wind, starring Deanna Durbin and Donald O'Connor
- Song of Scheherazade, starring Yvonne De Carlo, Jean-Pierre Aumont, Brian Donlevy
- Song of the Thin Man, starring William Powell and Myrna Loy
- The Spring River Flows East (Yi jiang chun shui xiang dong liu) – (China)
- Story of a Bad Woman (Historia de una mala mujer), starring Dolores del Río – (Argentina)

=== T ===
- T-Men, directed by Anthony Mann, starring Dennis O'Keefe
- Temptation Harbour, starring Robert Newton and Simone Simon – (GB)
- They Made Me a Fugitive, directed by Alberto Cavalcanti, starring Trevor Howard – (GB)
- They Won't Believe Me, starring Robert Young and Susan Hayward
- This Time for Keeps, starring Esther Williams and Jimmy Durante
- The Three Garcias (Los tres García), starring Pedro Infante – (Mexico)
- To Live in Peace (Vivere in pace) – (Italy)
- The Two Mrs. Carrolls, starring Humphrey Bogart, Barbara Stanwyck, Alexis Smith
- Trail Street, starring Randolph Scott

=== U ===
- Uncle Silas, starring Jean Simmons – (GB)
- Unconquered, starring Gary Cooper and Paulette Goddard
- The Unfaithful, starring Ann Sheridan and Lew Ayres
- The Unsuspected, starring Claude Rains and Joan Caulfield

=== V ===
- The Voice of the Turtle, starring Ronald Reagan

=== W ===
- The Web, starring Ella Raines and Edmond O'Brien
- Welcome Stranger, starring Bing Crosby and Barry Fitzgerald
- Whispering City, starring Paul Lukas – (Canada)
- The Wistful Widow of Wagon Gap, starring Bud Abbott and Lou Costello
- The Woman on the Beach, starring Joan Bennett and Robert Ryan
- Wyoming, starring Wild Bill Elliott

== Serials ==
- The Black Widow, starring Bruce Edwards
- Brick Bradford, starring Kane Richmond
- Jack Armstrong
- Jesse James Rides Again, starring Clayton Moore and Linda Stirling
- The Sea Hound, starring Buster Crabbe
- Son of Zorro, starring George Turner and Peggy Stewart
- The Vigilante, starring Ralph Byrd

== Short film series ==
- Mickey Mouse (1928–1953)
- Looney Tunes (1930–1969)
- Terrytoons (1930–1964)
- Merrie Melodies (1931–1969)
- The Three Stooges (1934–1959)
- Donald Duck (1934–1956)
- Andy Panda (1939–1949)
- Color Rhapsodies (1934–1949)
- The Fox and the Crow (1941–1950)
- Bugs Bunny (1940–1964)
- Chip and Dale (1943–1956)
- Red Hot Riding Hood (1943–1949)
- Popeye (1933–1957)
- Tom and Jerry (1940–1958)
- George and Junior (1946–1948)
- Mighty Mouse (1942–1955)
- Pluto (1937–1951)
- Goofy (1939–1953)
- Woody Woodpecker (1941–1949)
- Yosemite Sam (1945–1963)

== Births ==
- January 4 – Tim Rooney, American actor (d. 2006)
- January 8 – David Bowie, English singer, songwriter and actor (d. 2016)
- January 10 – Mario Ernesto Sánchez, Cuban-American actor (d. 2025)
- January 11
  - William Caskey Swaim, American actor
  - Vinny Vella, American actor, talk show host and comedian (d. 2019)
- January 15 – Andrea Martin, Canadian-American actress
- January 17
  - Joanna David, English actress
  - Jane Elliot, American actress
  - Peter Werner, American director (d. 2023)
- January 18 – Takeshi Kitano, Japanese writer-director, actor, comedian, author and video game creator
- January 23 – Joel Douglas, American producer
- January 26 – Richard Portnow, American actor
- January 27 – Peter Burroughs, British actor
- January 29 – Ernie Lively, American actor and acting coach (d. 2021)
- January 31
  - Jonathan Banks, American actor
  - Glynn Turman, American actor, writer, director and producer
- February 2 – Farrah Fawcett, American actress (d. 2009)
- February 3
  - Paul Auster, American novelist, screenwriter and director (d. 2024)
  - Stephen McHattie, Canadian actor
  - Tonea Stewart, American actress
- February 5 – David Ladd, American producer and actor
- February 7 – Wayne Allwine, American voice actor (d. 2009)
- February 11 – Brian Capron, English actor
- February 24
  - Edward James Olmos, American actor
  - Elena Solovey, Soviet-Russian actress
- February 28 – Stephanie Beacham, English actress
- March 1 – Alan Thicke, Canadian-American actor (d. 2016)
- March 4 – Gunnar Hansen, Icelandic actor (d. 2015)
- March 6
  - Martin Kove, American actor and martial artist
  - Rob Reiner, American actor, comedian, producer and director (d. 2025)
- March 9 – Frank Grimes, Irish actor (d. 2025)
- March 10 – Colin Stinton, Canadian actor
- March 12 – Rupert Frazer, British actor
- March 18
  - Patrick Barlow, English actor, comedian and playwright
  - Aleksander Krupa, Polish actor
  - Nicholas Le Prevost, English actor
- March 19
  - Glenn Close, American actress
  - Dermot Crowley, Irish stage, film and television actor
- March 20 – Anthony Peck, American actor (d. 1996)
- March 22 – Tony Pope, American voice actor (d. 2004)
- March 23
  - Terry Alexander, American actor
  - Kim Hee-ra, South Korean movie actor
- March 25 – Elton John, English singer and songwriter
- March 26
  - Homayoun Ershadi, Iranian actor (d. 2025)
  - John Morton, American movie actor, stuntman and writer
- March 27 – Chick Vennera, American actor (d. 2021)
- April 2
  - Sam Anderson, American actor
  - Ezra Dagan, Israeli actor
- April 6 – John Ratzenberger, American actor
- April 11
  - Peter Riegert, American actor, director and screenwriter
  - Meshach Taylor, American actor (d. 2014)
- April 12 – Dan Lauria, American actor
- April 15 – Lois Chiles, American actress
- April 17 – Charles Frank, American actor
- April 18
  - Cindy Pickett, American actress
  - James Woods, American actor
- April 19 – Gillian Jones, Australian actress
- April 21 - Sam Weisman, American director and producer, previously actor
- April 25
  - Jeffrey DeMunn, American actor
  - Myra Turley, American actress
- April 26 – Ron McLarty, American actor and playwright (d. 2020)
- April 30 – Elizabeth Hawthorne, New Zealand actress
- May 2 - Nirut Sirijanya, Thai actor
- May 4 – Richard Jenkins, American actor
- May 6 – Alan Dale, New Zealand actor
- May 8
  - Jamie Donnelly, American actress
  - Katia Tchenko, French actress
- May 9 – Anthony Higgins, English actor
- May 13 – Charles Gordon, American producer (d. 2020)
- May 14 – Hans Strydom, South African actor and writer
- May 16 – Bill Smitrovich, American actor
- May 18 – Hugh Keays-Byrne, British-Australian actor and director (d. 2020)
- May 25 – Jacki Weaver, Australian actress
- May 31 – Steven Kampmann, American actor, writer and director
- June 1 – Jonathan Pryce, Welsh actor
- June 6 – Robert Englund, American actor
- June 10 – Fred Asparagus, American comedian and actor (d. 1998)
- June 11 - Ken Bones, English actor
- June 18 – Hanns Zischler, German actor
- June 19 – Youn Yuh-jung, South-Korean actress
- June 20 – Candy Clark, American actress
- June 21
  - Michael Gross, American actor
  - Lex van Delden, Dutch actor and singer (d. 2010)
- June 22 – David Lander, American character actor, comedian, musician and baseball scout (d. 2020)
- June 23
  - Bryan Brown, Australian actor
  - Kerry Rossall, American stunt coordinator, stuntman, actor and producer
- June 24 – Peter Weller, American actor
- June 25 – Jimmie Walker, American actor and comedian
- June 29 - Richard Lewis, American stand-up comedian, actor and writer (d. 2024)
- June 30 – Tõnis Rätsep, Estonian actor
- July 2
  - Larry David, American comedian, writer, actor and television producer
  - Stephen Stucker, American actor (d. 1986)
- July 6
  - Richard Beckinsale, English actor (d. 1979)
  - Shelley Hack, American actress and producer
- July 9 – O. J. Simpson, American football player and actor (d. 2024)
- July 19 - Rikiya Yasuoka, Japanese actor (d. 2012)
- July 22
  - Albert Brooks, American actor, comedian and director
  - J. Kenneth Campbell, American actor
- July 23 - Mohan Agashe, Indian actor
- July 24 – Robert Hays, American actor
- July 29 – Dennis Cleveland Stewart, American actor and dancer (d. 1994)
- July 30
  - Arnold Schwarzenegger, Austrian-born American actor, bodybuilder and 38th Governor of California
  - William Atherton, American actor
- July 31 – Richard Griffiths, English actor (d. 2013)
- August 3 – John Wesley, American actor (d. 2019)
- August 5 – Angry Anderson, Australian singer-songwriter, television personality and actor (d. 2026)
- August 6 - Oliver Tobias, English actor
- August 8 - George Costigan, English actor
- August 15 – Jenny Hanley, English actress
- August 17 - Jennifer Rhodes, American actress
- August 19 – Gerald McRaney, American actor
- August 20 – Ray Wise, American actor
- August 22 – Cindy Williams, American actress (d. 2023)
- August 23 - David Robb, Scottish actor
- August 24 – Anne Archer, American actress
- August 27 – Barbara Bach, American actress
- August 28
  - James Aubrey, English actor (d. 2010)
  - Alice Playten, American actress (d. 2011)
- August 31 – Mona Marshall, American voice actress
- September 4 - David St. James, American character actor and comedian
- September 6
  - Jane Curtin, American actress and comedian
  - Keone Young, American actor and voice actor
- September 7 – David McGillivray, British screenwriter
- September 12 – Bjørn Floberg, Norwegian actor
- September 14 – Sam Neill, New Zealand actor (d. 2026)
- September 15 – Sandra Prinsloo, South African actress
- September 21 – Stephen King, American author
- September 23
  - Caroline Lagerfelt, French-born American actress
  - Mary Kay Place, American actress
- September 24 – R. H. Thomson, Canadian actor
- September 27
  - Denis Lawson, Scottish actor and director
  - Meat Loaf, American singer and actor (d. 2022)
- September 29 – Martin Ferrero, American actor
- October 1
  - Stephen Collins, American actor
  - Richard E. Council, American actor
- October 7 - Jill Larson, American actress
- October 13 – Susan Blommaert, American actress
- October 16 – David Zucker, American director, producer and screenwriter
- October 17
  - Simi Garewal, Indian actress and talk show host
  - Rajendra Gupta, Indian actor and director
  - Michael McKean, American actor and comedian
- October 18 – Joe Morton, American actor
- October 23
  - Miles Anderson, British actor
  - Frank DiLeo, American actor (d. 2011)
- October 24 – Kevin Kline, American actor
- October 26 – Ene Järvis, Estonian actress (d. 2025)
- October 27 - Angus MacInnes, Canadian actor (d. 2024)
- October 29 – Richard Dreyfuss, American actor
- November 7 - Holmes Osborne, American character actor
- November 9 - Robert David Hall, American actor
- November 11 - Roberto Nobile, Italian actor (d. 2022)
- November 13 – Joe Mantegna, American actor
- November 17 - Steven E. de Souza, American screenwriter, producer and director
- November 21 – Tiny Ron Taylor, American actor (d. 2019)
- November 24
  - Sasson Gabai, Israeli actor
  - Dwight Schultz, American actor and voice actor
- November 25
  - Jonathan Kaplan, American producer and director (d. 2025)
  - John Larroquette, American actor
  - Tracey Walter, American character actor
- November 30
  - Stuart Baird, English editor, producer and director
  - Jude Ciccolella, American actor and singer
  - David Mamet, American filmmaker and screenwriter
- December 4 – Tõnu Kark, Estonian actor
- December 5 – JoBe Cerny, American actor
- December 8 – Bruce Kimmel, American actor, director, writer
- December 10 – Kathy Lamkin, American actress (d. 2022)
- December 12 – Wings Hauser, American actor, screenwriter, director and musician (d. 2025)
- December 13 - Darlene Cates, American actress (d. 2017)
- December 16 – Ben Cross, English actor (d. 2020)
- December 17 – Wes Studi, Cherokee American actor and film producer
- December 25
  - Twink Caplan, American actress, comedian and producer
  - Michael D. Roberts, American actor
- December 26
  - Trina Parks, American actress
  - Peter Sattmann, German actor (d. 2025)
- December 28 – Peter MacGregor-Scott, British producer (d. 2017)
- December 29 – Ted Danson, American actor
- December 31 – Tim Matheson, American actor, director and producer

== Deaths ==
- January 26 – Grace Moore, 48, American opera singer and actress, One Night of Love, The King Steps Out, When You're in Love
- February 12 – Sidney Toler, 72, American actor, Charlie Chan in the Secret Service, The Chinese Cat
- March 8 – Victor Potel, 57, American actor and comedian, Sullivan's Travels, The Miracle of Morgan's Creek, The Palm Beach Story, The Egg and I
- May 18 – Lucile Gleason, 59, American actress, I Like It That Way, A Successful Failure, Should Husbands Work?, The Clock
- May 31 – Adrienne Ames, 39, American actress, The Death Kiss, You're Telling Me!, Slander House, Gigolette
- June 1 – Anna Hofman-Uddgren, 79, Swedish director and actress
- June 5 – Nils Olaf Chrisander, 63, Swedish actor and director
- July 15 – Henry Kolker, 72, American actor and director, Baby Face, Holiday, The Great Swindle, The Parson of Panamint
- July 28 – Robert Homans, 69, American actor, Suicide Squad, The Grapes of Wrath, Night Monster, The Scarlet Clue
- August 30 – Gunnar Sommerfeldt, 56, Danish actor and director
- September 21 – Harry Carey, 69, American actor, Mr. Smith Goes to Washington, Angel and the Badman, Red River, Beyond Tomorrow
- October 1 – Olive Borden, 40, American actress, 3 Bad Men, Half Marriage, Leave It to Me
- October 13 – LeRoy Mason, 44, American actor, The Painted Stallion, Silver Stallion
- October 17 – John Halliday, 67, American actor, The Philadelphia Story, Intermezzo
- October 18 – Harry C. Bradley, 78, American actor, Beyond the Law, Sing While You're Able
- October 24 – Dudley Digges, 68, Irish actor, The Maltese Falcon, Mutiny on the Bounty, The Fight for Life
- November 10 – Jack Rockwell, 57, American actor
- November 26 – Ernie Adams, 62, American actor The Pride of the Yankees, Invisible Ghost
- December 21 – Mark Hellinger, 47, American producer, High Sierra, They Drive By Night, The Two Mrs. Carrolls
- December 26 – Urban Gad, 68, Danish director and screenwriter, The Abyss, Little Angel, The Island of the Lost

== Film debuts ==
- Georg Adelly – Private Karlsson on Leave
- Anouk Aimée – La maison sous la mer
- Lola Albright – The Unfinished Dance
- Terence Alexander – Fame Is the Spur
- Richard Anderson – The Pearl
- Richard Basehart – Repeat Performance
- Timothy Bateson – The Life and Adventures of Nicholas Nickleby
- Ed Begley – Boomerang
- Honor Blackman – Fame Is the Spur
- Wilfrid Brambell – Odd Man Out
- Dora Bryan – Odd Man Out
- Frank Cady – Violence
- George Chakiris – Song of Love
- Helen Cherry – The Courtneys of Curzon Street
- Fred Clark – The Unsuspected
- Russ Conway – Buck Privates Come Home
- Henry Corden – The Secret Life of Walter Mitty
- Wendell Corey – Desert Fury
- Rosalie Crutchley – Take My Life
- Arlene Dahl – My Wild Irish Rose
- Cesare Danova – The Captain's Daughter
- Ted de Corsia – The Lady from Shanghai
- Frank de Kova – Kiss of Death
- Maurice Denham – The Man Within
- Ivan Desny – La fleur de l'âge
- Diana Dors – Code of Scotland Yard
- Howard Duff – Brute Force
- Jack Elam – Mystery Range
- Gene Evans – Under Colorado Skies
- Mel Ferrer – The Fugitive
- Anne Francis – This Time for Keeps
- Bert Freed – Carnegie Hall
- Gloria Henry – Sport of Kings
- Jimmy Hunt – My Brother Talks to Horses
- Sid James – Black Memory
- Geoffrey Keen – Odd Man Out
- Barry Kelley – Boomerang
- DeForest Kelley – Fear in the Night
- Mickey Knox – I Walk Alone
- Henry Kulky – A Likely Story
- Joi Lansing – When a Girl's Beautiful
- Cloris Leachman – Carnegie Hall
- Janet Leigh – The Romance of Rosy Ridge
- Ken Lynch – Gentleman's Agreement
- Marion Marshall – Gentleman's Agreement
- Donna Martell – Apache Rose
- Sean McClory – Dick Tracy Meets Gruesome
- William Mervyn – The Loves of Joanna Godden
- Toshiro Mifune – Snow Trail
- Hayley Mills – So Well Remembered
- Martin Milner – Life with Father
- John Mitchum – The Prairie
- Marilyn Monroe – Dangerous Years
- Paulene Myers – Boomerang
- Dandy Nichols – Hue and Cry
- Dan O'Herlihy – Hungry Hill
- Werner Peters – Between Yesterday and Tomorrow
- William Edward Phipps – Crossfire
- Wensley Pithey – The Mark of Cain
- Sidney Poitier – Sepia Cinderella
- Denver Pyle – The Guilt of Janet Ames
- Thelma Ritter – Miracle on 34th Street
- William Schallert – The Foxes of Harrow
- Gerald Sim – Fame Is the Spur
- Constance Smith – Jassy
- Jan Sterling – Tycoon
- Kenneth Tobey – Dangerous Venture
- Leopoldo Trieste – Preludio d'amore
- Michael Ward – An Ideal Husband
- Russell Waters – The Woman in the Hall
- Jesse White – Kiss of Death
- Richard Widmark – Kiss of Death

== Bibliography ==
- Birchard, Robert S. (2004). Cecil B. DeMille's Hollywood. University Press of Kentucky. ISBN 978-0813123240.
