= List of Italian films of 1947 =

A list of films produced in Italy in 1947 (see 1947 in film):

== A–Z ==
| Title | Director | Cast | Genre | Notes |
|---|---|---|---|---|
1947
| Addio Mimí! | Carmine Gallone | Mártha Eggerth, Jan Kiepura, Janis Carter | Musical drama | |
| Angelina | Luigi Zampa | Anna Magnani, Nando Bruno, Ave Ninchi | Italian neorealism | Venice award and Nastro d'Argento for Best Actress (Magnani) |
| The Barber of Seville | Mario Costa | Ferruccio Tagliavini, Tito Gobbi, Nelly Corradi | Musical | |
| The Brothers Karamazov | Giacomo Gentilomo | Fosco Giachetti, Mariella Lotti, Elli Parvo | Drama | |
| The Courier of the King | Gennaro Righelli | Rossano Brazzi, Irasema Dilián, Valentina Cortese | Historical | |
| Eleonora Duse | Filippo Walter Ratti | Elisa Cegani, Rossano Brazzi, Andrea Checchi | Biopic | |
| Fatal Symphony | Victor Stoloff | Douglass Montgomery, Marina Berti, Sarah Churchill | Drama | |
| Fire Over the Sea | Michael Waszynski, Vittorio Cottafavi | Carlo Ninchi, Evi Maltagliati, Silvana Jachino | Drama | |
| Flesh Will Surrender | Alberto Lattuada | Aldo Fabrizi, Roldano Lupi, Yvonne Sanson | Drama | 2 Nastro d'Argento |
| Fury | Goffredo Alessandrini | Isa Pola, Rossano Brazzi, Gino Cervi | Drama | |
| The Great Dawn | Giuseppe Maria Scotese | Renée Faure, Rossano Brazzi, Yvonne Sanson | Drama | |
| Lost in the Dark | Camillo Mastrocinque | Vittorio De Sica, Enrico Glori, Fiorella Betti | Drama | |
| The Lady of the Camellias | Carmine Gallone | Nelly Corradi, Carlo Lombardi, Tito Gobbi | Musical | |
| Last Love | Luigi Chiarini | Clara Calamai, Andrea Checchi, Carlo Ninchi | Drama | |
| Lost Youth | Pietro Germi | Massimo Girotti, Carla Del Poggio, Jacques Sernas | Drama | 2 Nastro d'Argento |
| A Man About the House | Leslie Arliss | Dulcie Gray, Margaret Johnston, Kieron Moore | Drama | Co-production with UK |
| Malaspina | Armando Fizzarotti | Aldo Bufi Landi, Rino Genovese, Ugo D'Alessio | Drama | |
| The Opium Den | Raffaello Matarazzo | Mariella Lotti, Emilio Cigoli, Paolo Stoppa | Crime | |
| The Other | Carlo Ludovico Bragaglia | Fosco Giachetti, Blanchette Brunoy, Maria Michi | Drama | |
| Pagliacci | Mario Costa | Gina Lollobrigida | Opera | Pagliacci |
| To Live in Peace | Luigi Zampa | Aldo Fabrizi, John Kitzmiller, Ave Ninchi | Comedy Drama | |
| The Two Orphans | Mario Mattoli | Totò, Carlo Campanini, Isa Barzizza | Comedy | |
| When Love Calls (Il Segreto di Don Giovanni) | Camillo Mastrocinque | Silvana Pampanini, Gino Bechi | Drama | |
| When the Angels Sleep | Ricardo Gascón | Amedeo Nazzari, Clara Calamai, Maria Eugénia | Drama | Co-production with Spain |
| The White Devil | Nunzio Malasomma | Rossano Brazzi, Annette Bach, Roldano Lupi | Adventure | |
| The White Primrose | Carlo Ludovico Bragaglia | Carlo Ninchi, Andrea Checchi, Laura Gore | Comedy | |

== Documentary ==
| Title | Director | Cast | Genre | Notes |
|---|---|---|---|---|
| Anfiteatro Flavio | Mario Bava | | | |
| Bambini in città | Luigi Comencini | | Documentary | Short Documentary |
