= 1947 in the United Kingdom =

Events from the year 1947 in the United Kingdom.

== Incumbents ==
- Monarch – George VI
- Prime Minister – Clement Attlee (Labour)

== Events ==
- 1 January – The government nationalises the coal industry in the UK and Cable & Wireless.
- 2 January – British coins cease to include any silver content.
- 8 January – A Cabinet sub-committee approves High Explosive Research, a civil project to develop an independent British atomic bomb.
- 5 February – The Minister of Food, John Strachey, announces the £25,000,000 Tanganyika groundnut scheme.
- 10 February – Major cuts in power supply due to shortages of fuel under severe winter conditions are imposed in England and Wales. The BBC Television Service is temporarily suspended until 11 March.
- 20 February – Earl Mountbatten of Burma is appointed as the last Viceroy of India.
- 23 February – Ealing Studios release the film Hue and Cry, regarded as the first of the Ealing Comedies.
- February – The coldest February in the CET series with an average of −1.9 °C (28.6 °F) features the coldest Central England maximum temperature for any month since records began in 1878 at 0.1 °C (32.2 °F).
- 4 March – Treaty of Dunkirk (coming into effect 8 September) signed with France providing for mutual assistance in the event of attack.
- 14 March – Thames flood and other widespread flooding as the exceptionally harsh winter ends in a thaw.
- March – Postwar boom in births reaches peak.
- April – English country houses at Arundel, Chatsworth and Longleat reopen to the visiting public, after wartime use.
- 1 April – Raising of school leaving age to fifteen.
- 3 April – The private healthcare firm BUPA is founded.
- 9 April – How Does Your Garden Grow? first broadcast on BBC Radio. As Gardeners' Question Time, it will still be running more than seventy-five years later.
- 15 April – A large bomb planted by members of Israeli militant group Lehi at the Colonial Office building in Whitehall (London) fails to explode.
- 18 April – In the largest non-nuclear single explosive detonation in history, the Royal Navy sets off 6,800 tonnes of surplus ammunition in an attempt to destroy Heligoland, Germany.
- 23 April – Mumbles Watson-class life-boat RNLB Edward, Prince of Wales (ON 678) capsizes on service to Liberty ship SS Samtampa off South Wales: all 8 lifeboat and 39 steamship crew are lost.
- 26 April – Charlton Athletic who lost the FA Cup final last year, win this year's final 1–0 against Burnley.
- May – The Conservative Party publishes its Industrial Charter.
- 6 May – East Kilbride designated as the first New Town in Scotland under powers of the New Towns Act 1946.
- 11–15 June – First Llangollen International Musical Eisteddfod is held.
- 15 June – Restrictions on foreign travel imposed during World War II lifted.
- June – Retail Prices Index begins.
- 10 July – Princess Elizabeth (the future Elizabeth II) announces her engagement to Lt. Philip Mountbatten (the future Duke of Edinburgh).
- 15 July–20 August – "Convertibility Crisis": Pound sterling fully convertible into United States Dollars, leading to loss of currency reserves.
- 27–28 July – English endurance swimmer Tom Blower becomes the first person to swim the North Channel, from Donaghadee in Northern Ireland to Portpatrick in Scotland.
- 31 July – Fire Services Act returns fire services in the United Kingdom from the National Fire Service to control of local authorities (from 1948) and provides the legislative basis for their organisation for more than fifty years.
- First few days of August – Anti-Jewish riots, primarily in North West England, following 'the Sergeants affair' in Mandatory Palestine.
- 5 August – Release of Holiday Camp, first of the popular Huggetts Trilogy of comedy films.
- 14 & 15 August – Pakistan and India gain independence from the UK, remaining Dominions with the Commonwealth of Nations under King George VI.
- 15 August
  - A mining accident at William Pit, Whitehaven, in the Cumberland Coalfield, kills 104 people.
  - "GLEEP" (the Graphite Low Energy Experimental Pile) experimental nuclear reactor runs for the first time at the Atomic Energy Research Establishment, Harwell, near Oxford, the first reactor to operate in Western Europe.
- 24 August – First Edinburgh Festival of the Arts opens. On 31 August, the first Edinburgh International Film Festival opens as part of the overall festival; it will become the world's oldest continually running film festival.
- September – The University of Cambridge votes to allow women to become full students.
- 29 September – Harold Wilson is appointed President of the Board of Trade at thirty-one years old; he is the youngest member of the Cabinet this century.
- October – Snoek is imported as a food fish from South Africa.
- 10 November – Decision of the Court of Appeal in Associated Provincial Picture Houses Ltd v Wednesbury Corporation, a leading case in the law of judicial review, establishing a standard of unreasonableness ("Wednesbury unreasonableness") of public-body decisions that makes them liable to be quashed on review.
- 12 November – Chancellor of the Exchequer Hugh Dalton inadvertently reveals some of the contents of his Budget while on his way to the House of Commons to deliver his speech, effectively finishing his political career.
- 16 November – The British Army begins to withdraw troops from Palestine.
- 18 November – Tommy Lawton, 28-year-old centre-forward, becomes Britain's first £20,000 footballer in a move from Chelsea to Notts County.
- 19 November – Philip Mountbatten is created Duke of Edinburgh, Earl of Merioneth and Baron Greenwich with the style His Royal Highness.
- 20 November – Wedding of Princess Elizabeth and Philip Mountbatten, Duke of Edinburgh: Princess Elizabeth (later Elizabeth II), daughter of George VI, marries The Duke of Edinburgh at Westminster Abbey, London. The procession is watched by an estimated 400,000 television viewers and is the oldest surviving telerecording in Britain.
- 25 November – New Zealand ratifies the Statute of Westminster and thus becomes independent of legislative control by the United Kingdom.
- 29 November – The United Nations approves the Partition Plan for Palestine thus ending the British Mandate of Palestine.
- 6 December – Women are admitted to full membership of the University of Cambridge.
- December
  - Edward Victor Appleton wins the Nobel Prize in Physics "for his investigations of the physics of the upper atmosphere especially for the discovery of the so-called Appleton layer".
  - Robert Robinson wins the Nobel Prize in Chemistry "for his investigations on plant products of biological importance, especially the alkaloids"
  - The Friends Service Council wins the Nobel Peace Prize.
  - First permanent Oxfam charity shop begins trading, in Broad Street, Oxford.

=== Undated ===
- Discovery of the pion, a subatomic particle, by Cecil Frank Powell at the University of Bristol.
- Discovery of the kaon, a subatomic particle, by George Rochester and C. C. Butler.
- Poliomyelitis epidemic in the UK begins.
- Royal Military Academy Sandhurst established by merger of the Royal Military College, Sandhurst, and the Royal Military Academy, Woolwich.
- Robert Wiseman Dairies founded by Robert Wiseman with a horse and cart used for doorstep deliveries in East Kilbride.
- Soft toilet paper first goes on sale in the UK, at Harrods.
- The avocet resumes breeding in England, at Havergate Island and Minsmere RSPB reserve.

== Publications ==
- Malcolm Lowry's novel Under the Volcano.
- Compton Mackenzie's comic novel Whisky Galore.
- Stephen Potter's book The Theory and Practice of Gamesmanship: Or, The Art of Winning Games Without Actually Cheating.

== Births ==
- 4 January – Rick Stein, chef, author and restaurateur
- 5 January – Chris Cutler, drummer and songwriter
- 6 January – Sandy Denny, folk rock singer (died 1978)
- 8 January – David Bowie, born David Jones, rock singer (died 2016)
- 10 January
  - Patricia Hodgson, broadcaster, educationalist and academic
  - Matthew Oakeshott, Baron Oakeshott of Seagrove Bay, banker and politician
- 15 January – Pete Waterman, record producer and songwriter
- 16 January
  - Magdalen Nabb, author (died 2007)
  - Harvey Proctor, Conservative Member of Parliament
  - Jamie Reid, visual artist (died 2023)
- 23 January – Mary Arden, lawyer and judge
- 27 January – Philip Sugden, historian and author (died 2014)
- 30 January
  - Les Barker, poet
  - Steve Marriott, rock singer and guitarist (Small Faces, Humble Pie) (died 1991)
- 3 February – Dave Davies, singer-songwriter and guitarist
- 10 February – Nicholas Owen, newsreader (ITN)
- 20 February – Peter Osgood, footballer (died 2006)
- 26 February – Sandie Shaw, pop singer
- 28 February – Stephanie Beacham, actress
- 1 March – Mike Read, television presenter and radio disc jockey
- 6 March – Kiki Dee, pop singer
- 7 March – Jane Relf, singer
- 10 March – Piers Corbyn, weather forecaster and political activist
- 11 March – Alan Yentob, television executive (died 2025)
- 14 March
  - Pam Ayres, comic verse writer and performer
  - Peter Skellern, singer-songwriter (died 2017)
- 18 March – Susan Sheridan, actress (died 2015)
- 24 March
  - Mike Kellie, rock musician (died 2017)
  - Alan Sugar, entrepreneur
- 25 March – Elton John, born Reginald Dwight, rock musician
- 28 March – Peter Hennessy, historian
- 16 April – Gerry Rafferty, singer-songwriter (died 2011)
- 20 April – David Leland, actor, director, and screenwriter
- 23 April – Bernadette Devlin McAliskey, Member of Parliament for Mid Ulster
- 30 April – Leslie Grantham, actor (EastEnders) and murderer (died 2018)
- 2 May – James Dyson, inventor and entrepreneur
- 6 May – Kit Martin, architect and author
- 8 May
  - Felicity Lott, soprano (died 2026)
  - John Reid, Labour politician, Home Secretary
- 12 May – Mike Cruise, astronomer and astrophysicist (died 2026)
- 19 May – Paul Brady, singer-songwriter
- 20 May – Greg Dyke, media executive, Director-General of the BBC
- 27 May – Felix Dennis, publisher and philanthropist (died 2014)
- 1 June
  - Jonathan Pryce, Welsh actor
  - Ronnie Wood, rock guitarist
- 2 June – Mark Elder, conductor
- 3 June – Mickey Finn, percussionist (died 2003)
- 5 June
  - Tom Evans, rock singer-songwriter (died 1983)
  - David Hare, playwright
- 6 June – David Blunkett, Labour politician, Home Secretary
- 7 June – Annette Brooke, educator and politician
- 11 June – Richard Palmer-James, singer-songwriter and guitarist
- 17 June – Paul Young, pop singer-songwriter (died 2000)
- 21 June – Joey Molland, songwriter and guitarist (died 2025)
- 22 June
  - Trevor Blades, cricketer
  - David Jones, Northern Irish golfer
- 23 June – Anne Owers, chief inspector of prisons
- 24 June
  - Mick Fleetwood, rock drummer
  - Clarissa Dickson Wright, chef and television personality (died 2014)
- 25 June – John Hilton, English table tennis player
- 28 June – Stephen Whittaker, actor (died 2003)
- 2 July
  - Elizabeth Anionwu, nurse and healthcare administrator
  - Ann Taylor, Labour politician
- 3 July – Adrian Bird, geneticist and academic
- 6 July – Richard Beckinsale, actor (died 1979)
- 7 July – Rob Townsend, rock drummer (Family)
- 12 July
  - Gareth Edwards, Welsh rugby player
  - Wilko Johnson, musician (died 2022)
- 13 July
  - Colin Thurston, record producer (died 2007)
  - Edward Wilson, actor (died 2008)
- 15 July – Peter Banks, guitarist and songwriter (died 2013)
- 17 July
  - Queen Camilla of the United Kingdom, née Shand
  - Phil Cordell, musician (died 2007)
  - Mick Tucker, musician (died 2002)
- 19 July – Brian May, rock guitarist (Queen)
- 23 July – David Essex, actor and singer
- 24 July
  - Geoff McQueen, screenwriter and producer (died 1994)
  - Chris Townson, musician (died 2008)
- 31 July – Richard Griffiths, actor (Withnail and I, Harry Potter) (died 2013)
- 9 August – Roy Hodgson, football manager
- 12 August – William Hartston, journalist and chess player
- 14 August – Christopher Hughes, quizzer and television personality (died 2025)
- 16 August – Katharine Hamnett, fashion designer
- 23 August
  - Willy Russell, playwright
  - Rowena Wallace, English-born Australian actress
- 28 August – Emlyn Hughes, footballer (died 2004)
- 10 September – David Pountney, theatre and opera director
- 16 September – Roger Millward, English rugby league footballer and coach
- 17 September – Tessa Jowell, Labour politician, Secretary of State for Culture, Media and Sport (died 2018)
- 18 September – Paul Seed, television director and former actor
- 21 September – Rupert Hine, musician, songwriter, and record producer (died 2020)
- 27 September – Barbara Dickson, singer and actress
- 28 September – Jon Snow, journalist and trelevision presenter
- 30 September – Marc Bolan, musician (died 1977)
- 1 October – Larry Lamb, actor
- 4 October – Ann Widdecombe, Conservative politician (died 2026)
- 5 October – Brian Johnson, rock singer
- 7 October – Pip Williams, record producer
- 11 October – Alan Pascoe, athlete
- 16 October
  - Nicholas Day, actor
  - Terry Griffiths, snooker player (died 2024)
  - Ken Woodward, footballer
- 2 November – Dave Pegg, folk musician, bass player (Fairport Convention, Jethro Tull)
- 6 November
  - Jim Rosenthal, ITV sport presenter
  - Carolyn Seymour, actress
- 8 November – Jenny Boyd, model
- 10 November – Greg Lake progressive rock singer-songwriter (Emerson, Lake & Palmer) (died 2016)
- 21 November – Nickolas Grace, actor
- 1 December – Bob Fulton, English-Australian rugby league footballer and coach
- 2 December
  - Michael P. Green, businessman
  - Tommy Jenkins, footballer and manager
  - Andy Rouse, racing driver
- 6 December – Geoffrey Hinton, English-born cognitive psychologist and computer scientist
- 7 December – Anne Fine, writer
- 8 December – John MacDougall, politician (died 2008)
- 12 December – Will Alsop, architect
- 16 December – Ben Cross, actor (died 2020)
- 20 December – Roger Alton, journalist
- 26 December – Liz Lochhead, poet and playwright

== Deaths ==
- 17 January – Arthur Headlam, theologian and Bishop of Gloucester (born 1862)
- 30 January – Frederick Blackman, plant physiologist (born 1866)
- 6 February – Ellen Wilkinson, socialist (born 1891)
- 11 February – Ernest Terah Hooley, financial fraudster (born 1859)
- 13 February – Pauline Johnson, silent film actress (born 1899)
- 21 February – Richard Barry Parker, architect and urban planner (born 1867)
- 2 March – Stanhope Forbes, painter of the Newlyn school (born 1857)
- 6 March – Sir Halford Mackinder, geographer (born 1861)
- 13 March – Angela Brazil, school-story writer for girls (born 1868)
- May – Edgar Philip Perman, chemistry professor (born 1866)
- 16 May – Sir Frederick Hopkins, biochemist, recipient of the Nobel Prize for Physiology or Medicine (born 1861)
- 6 June – James Agate, author and critic (born 1877)
- 24 July – Ernest Austin, composer (born 1874)
- 25 July – Kathleen Scott (Lady Scott), sculptor, widow of Capt. Scott (born 1878)
- 23 August – Roy Chadwick, aircraft designer (born 1893; killed in aircraft accident)
- 13 October – Sidney Webb, political economist (born 1859)
- 28 November – James Miller, Scottish architect (born 1860)
- 1 December
  - Samuel Courtauld, art collector (born 1876)
  - Aleister Crowley, occultist (born 1875)
  - G. H. Hardy, mathematician (born 1877)
- 14 December
  - Stanley Baldwin, former Prime Minister (born 1867)
  - Will Fyffe, Scottish music hall entertainer (born 1885; fell from hotel room window)
- 15 December – Arthur Machen, Welsh journalist, novelist and short-story writer (born 1863)
- 17 December – Bernard Spilsbury, forensic pathologist (born 1877; suicide)
- 30 December – Alfred North Whitehead, mathematician and philosopher (born 1861)

== See also ==
- List of British films of 1947
- The Winter of 1946-47 in the U.K.
- 1947 English cricket season, in what was called a "glorious summer"
