= Winter of 1946–47 in the United Kingdom =

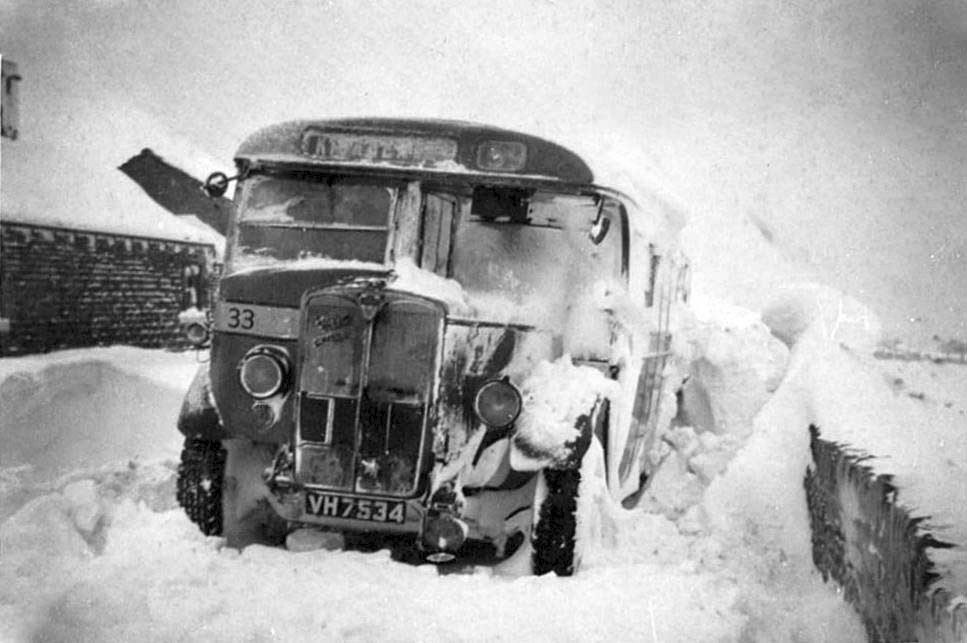
- Snowbound bus, Castle Hill, Huddersfield.

Meteorological information
- Lowest temperature: −21.3 °C (−6.3 °F) Elmstone, Kent
- Maximum snowfall or ice accretion: 83 in (210 cm) Forest-in-Teesdale, County Durham

Overall effects
- Areas affected: United Kingdom and Ireland

The winter of 1946–1947 was harsh in Europe, and noted for its adverse effects in the United Kingdom. It caused severe hardships in economic terms and living conditions in a country still recovering from the Second World War. There were massive disruptions of energy supply for homes, offices and factories. Animal herds froze or starved to death. People suffered from the persistent cold, and many businesses shut down temporarily. When warm weather returned, the ice thawed and flooding was severe in most low-lying areas.

Beginning on 23 January 1947, the UK experienced several cold spells that brought large drifts of snow to the country, blocking roads and railways, which caused problems transporting coal to the electric power stations. Many had to shut down, forcing severe restrictions to cut power consumption, including restricting domestic electricity to nineteen hours per day and cutting some industrial supplies completely. In addition, radio broadcasts were limited, television services were suspended, some magazines were ordered to stop publishing, and newspapers were reduced in size. These measures, on top of the low temperatures, badly affected public morale and the Minister of Fuel and Power, Emanuel Shinwell, became a scapegoat; he received death threats and had to be placed under police guard. Towards the end of February, there were also fears of a food shortage as supplies were cut off and vegetables were frozen into the ground.

Mid-March brought warmer air to the country which thawed the snow lying on the ground. This snowmelt rapidly ran off the frozen ground into rivers and caused widespread flooding. More than 100,000 properties were affected, and the British Army and foreign aid agencies were required to provide humanitarian aid. With the cold spell over and the ground thawing, there were no further weather problems. The winter had severe effects on British industries, causing the loss of around 10% of the year's industrial production, 10 to 20% of cereal and potato crops, and a quarter of sheep stocks. The governing Labour Party began to lose its popularity, which led to its loss of many seats to the Conservative Party in the 1950 general election; on top of other factors. That winter is also cited as a factor in the devaluation of the pound from US$4.03 to US$2.80 and the introduction of the Marshall Plan to rebuild war-torn Europe. The effects on the rest of Europe were also severe, with 150 deaths from cold and famine in Berlin, civil disorder in the Netherlands and business closures in the Republic of Ireland.

== Fuel shortage ==
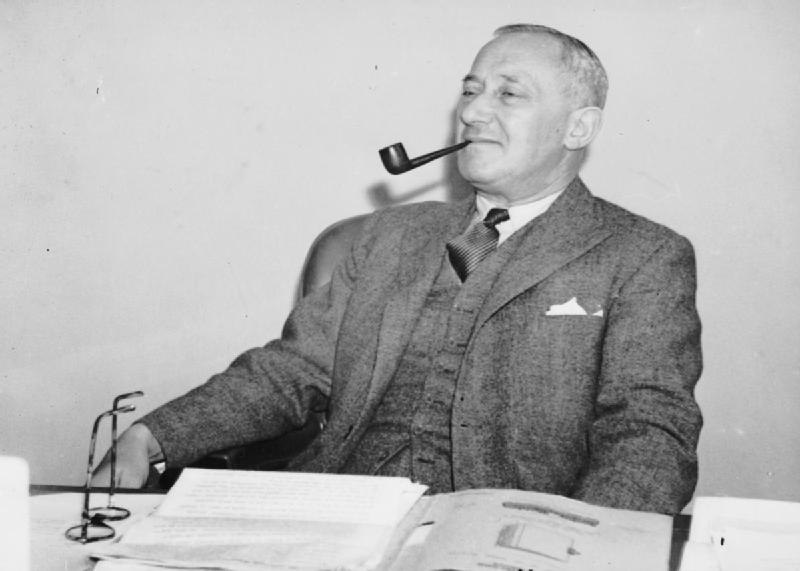
Minister of Fuel and Power, Emanuel Shinwell

The effects of the cold winter were exacerbated by problems in the energy sector which caused coal supplies to become low. The coal and electricity industries had been recently nationalised by Clement Attlee's government and placed under the control of the Minister of Fuel and Power, Manny Shinwell. Shinwell oversaw efforts to increase production, but there were concerns that the coal supply was inadequate. At the start of the winter the coal stockpiles contained enough coal to last for just four weeks, compared to the usual supplies of ten to twelve weeks which existed before the war. However, Shinwell allowed himself to be lulled into a false sense of security by over-optimistic productivity reports from the National Union of Mineworkers (NUM). These reports failed to translate into real production as the government feared to take on the NUM, whose members' absentee rates were 2.5 times those of the pre-war period. The risk of a coal shortage caused the public to buy electric fires to ensure a source of heat for their homes. This, in turn, put a greater strain on the supply of electricity – the monthly demand increase caused by electric fires in 1946 was roughly the same as the annual increase in generating capacity. Shinwell was warned in mid-October that a coal shortage was possible, but gambled on a mild winter to keep consumption low so that he would not have to risk a confrontation with the miners.

== Timeline ==
=== January ===
The winter began with two periods of cold weather in December 1946 and January 1947, but the coldest period did not begin until 21 January 1947. The main cause of the cold weather was an anticyclone which sat over Scandinavia from 20 January. This high-pressure area blocked the progression of depressions across the Atlantic Ocean and forced them to the south of the United Kingdom, resulting in strong easterly winds which brought snow to eastern and south-eastern England before progressing across the entire country. This cold spell continued and by 30 January the Isles of Scilly were under 7 inches (0.18 m) of snow and the overnight temperature at Writtle, Essex, was −20 °C (−4 °F). Throughout January the highest recorded temperature in England and Wales was 14 °C (57 °F) and the minimum was −21 °C (−6 °F).

=== February ===
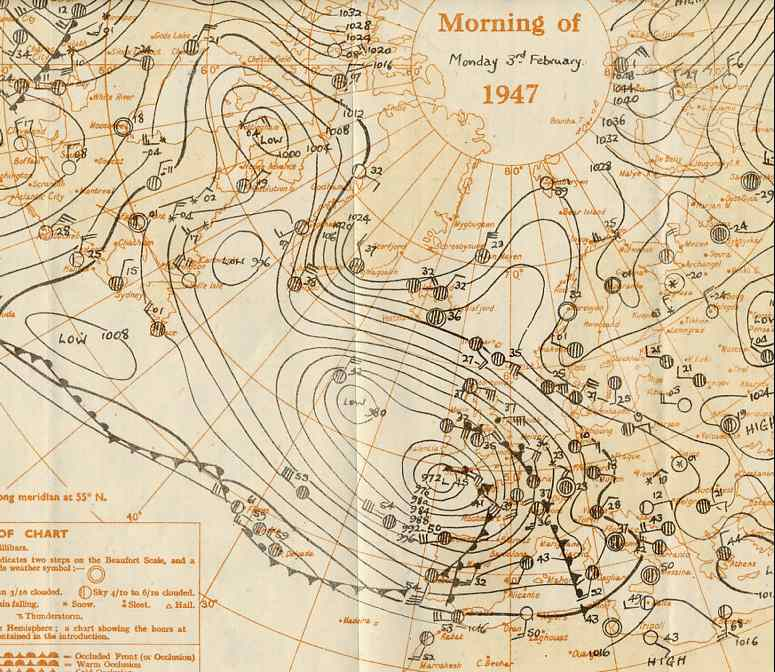
Low pressure over the UK on 3 February

The easterly winds continued into February, which developed into one of the coldest months on record. At Kew Observatory there was no recorded temperature above 5 °C (41 °F) for the month and only twice was the overnight temperature above 0 °C (32 °F). No sunshine at all was recorded at Kew for twenty days from 2 February, whilst across England and Wales the month was the second-dullest February since records began in 1929, with only 30.8 hours of sunshine or 1.1 per day. In contrast, West Scotland was near-record dry and unusually sunny, though still extremely cold. On 20 February the ferry service across the English Channel between Dover and Ostend was suspended due to pack ice off the Belgian coast. In some places snow fell on 26 days out of 28 in the month and a temperature of −21 °C (−6 °F) was recorded at Woburn, Bedfordshire, on 25 February. As a result, railways were badly affected by drifts of light powdery snow and three hundred main roads were made unusable. Several hundred villages were cut off. Ice floes were also seen off the coast of East Anglia, causing a hazard to shipping.

This cold weather exacerbated the fuel problem. Stockpiles of coal at the pits and depots froze solid and could not be moved. The snow also trapped 750,000 railway wagons of coal and made roads unusable, further hampering transport. A force of 100,000 British and Polish troops and German prisoners of war were put to work clearing snow from the railways by hand, while desperate attempts were made to get fuel to power stations by coal-carrying ships which risked storms, fog and ice to reach their destinations. Despite such expedients, lack of fuel forced many power stations to shut down or reduce their output. The Royal Navy launched Operation Blackcurrant, which used diesel generators aboard submarines to provide supplementary power to coastal towns and dockyards.

Shinwell acted to reduce consumption of coal by cutting the electricity supply to industry completely and reducing the domestic supply to 19 hours per day across the country. In consequence factories across the country were forced to shut down and up to four million people claimed unemployment benefits. Although so many people were made redundant there was little unrest and no major public disorders. Television services were suspended completely, radio broadcasts were reduced, some magazines were ordered to suspend publication, and newspapers were cut in size to four pages or one sheet. Food rations, still in use from the Second World War, were cut to levels lower than in the war years. These measures made little difference to the rate of coal consumption but served to reduce public morale.

Despite Shinwell's actions the fuel supply remained insufficient and blackouts occurred across large swathes of the country, forcing even the staff at Buckingham Palace, the Houses of Parliament and London's Central Electricity Board to work by candlelight. A trade meeting with representatives from Russia and Iceland was also held without light or heating; one of the items discussed was the purchase of coal from Britain. The public was reduced to queuing at gasworks to collect coke for use as fuel. Supplies of aspirin also ran low as it was then a product of coal-tar, thousands of chickens in poultry farms died of the cold, and public transport services were cut to save fuel. Shinwell became increasingly unpopular with the general public and received a bomb threat, after which a four-man police guard was stationed at his house in Tooting. Despite this, he remained very popular with the miners, which made the government wary of dismissing him in case it caused industrial action. By 27 February sea conditions had improved and more than 100 coal ships had managed to unload their cargoes at the power stations, easing the fuel crisis.

During this period there was a fear that, despite the rationing, food supplies could run out owing to the effects of the cold on vegetables, livestock and delivery vehicles. In response, the government started a largely unsuccessful campaign to popularise snoek, an inexpensive South African variety of fish; the public found the fish unpalatable and its stocks were eventually used as cat food. Many winter root vegetables could not be harvested as they were frozen into the ground, and in some areas pneumatic drills were used to excavate them. Frost destroyed 70,000 long tons (71,000 t) of potatoes and, as a result, potatoes were rationed for the first time.

=== March ===
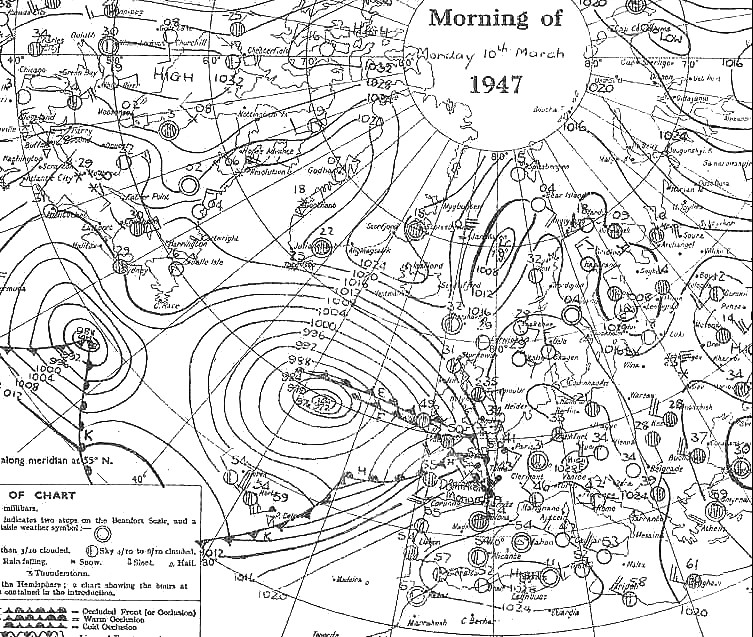
Milder air moving over the UK on 10 March

On 4–5 March came heavy snow which left drifts across much of the country with some lying 7 metres (23 ft) deep in the Scottish Highlands. On 5 March one of the worst British blizzards of the 20th century occurred. Food supplies were again affected by the snow-bound roads and in some places the police requested permission to break into delivery lorries stranded by the snow.

On 10 March milder air of 7–10 °C (45–50 °F) began to move north across the country from the south-west, rapidly thawing the snow lying on low ground. However, after such a long frost the ground stayed frozen. The frozen ground caused much surface runoff which resulted in widespread flooding. Further heavy snowfalls occurred as the milder air pushed northwards. On 14 March the deepest ever recorded depth of snow lying in an inhabited location of the UK was measured at Forest-in-Teesdale in County Durham at 83 inches (210 cm). On 15 March a deepening depression moved in from the Atlantic, bringing heavy rain and gales. It was the start of the wettest March for 300 years. By 16 March winds reached 50 knots (90 km/h) with 90-knot (170 km/h) gusts, causing breaches in dykes in East Anglia that resulted in the flooding of 100 square miles (260 km^{2}) of land, and blowing many trees down. The rivers Thames and Lea flooded in London, causing the Windsor borough engineer Geoffrey Baker to remark: "We could only cope if we had a spare Thames, or two."

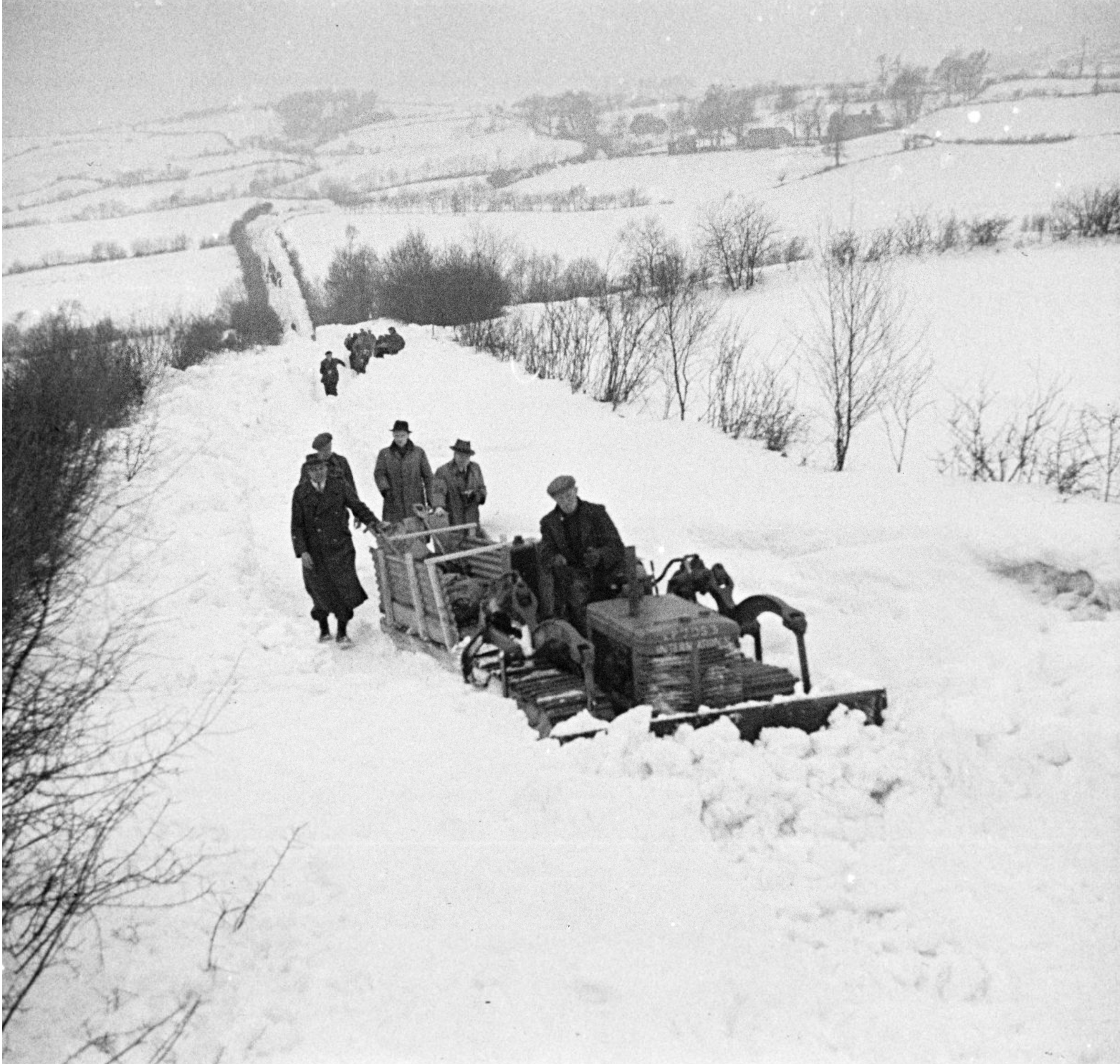
A bulldozer towing a sledge delivers bread to the snowbound village of Llanwddyn, Montgomeryshire, on 15 March 1947.

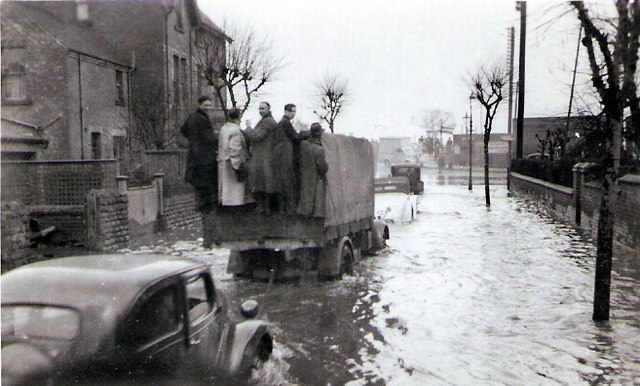
Flooding from the River Trent in West Bridgford near Nottingham

On 17–18 March the River Trent overtopped its banks in Nottingham. Large parts of the city and surrounding areas were flooded, in which 9,000 properties and nearly a hundred industrial premises were affected – some to first-floor height. The suburbs of West Bridgford and Beeston suffered particularly badly, as did nearby Long Eaton in Derbyshire, which experienced extensive flooding. Two days later, in the lower tidal reaches of the river, the peak of the flood combined with a high spring tide to flood villages and 2,000 properties in Gainsborough. River levels dropped when the floodbank at Morton breached, resulting in the flooding of some 77 square miles (200 km^{2}) of farmland in the Trent valley. The flooding subsided in the west of the country by 20 March but rivers in the east were still rising and the Wharfe, Derwent, Aire and Ouse all burst their banks in the West Riding of Yorkshire. Selby was also badly affected with 70 per cent of houses being flooded. More than 100,000 properties were affected by the flooding and the Army worked to prevent the spread of the floodwater, particularly at pumping plants and power stations. Royal Engineers on national service handed out milk to families with babies and the Australian Red Cross assisted in Gloucester. The people of Canada sent food parcels to villages in Suffolk and the Premier of Ontario, George A. Drew, offered to help distribute them personally. The flooding lasted for about a week, with some waters taking an additional ten days to subside.

== Legacy ==
The winter had a lasting effect on Britain's industry; by February 1947 it was already estimated that that year's industrial output would be down by 10 per cent. The effects of the March floods added a further £250–375 million (equivalent to £12.36–18.53 billion in 2023) in damage. Farming was particularly badly hit with cereal and potato harvests down 10 to 20 per cent on the previous two years. Sheep farmers lost one quarter of their flocks and it was six years before sheep numbers recovered.

In Wales a disaster fund of £4,575,000 was partly allocated to assist farmers who lost about 4 million sheep.

The winter had political ramifications and caused the public to lose faith in a Labour government who could not maintain food and electricity supplies. Shinwell never publicly admitted that the crisis had resulted from low coal supplies, instead blaming the climate, the railway system, or capitalism generally. But the public blamed the long-time Labour activist, and Shinwell was forced to resign in October. Shinwell's resignation did not absolve the party: Labour lost a large number of seats to the Conservative Party in the following election (but retained a slim majority). Youngs et al. conclude that, "Probably more than anything else, the fuel crisis of 1947 led to a loss of public confidence in the Labour government."

The effects of the winter came at a time of heavy government spending with 15 per cent of the GDP being spent on the armed forces and large expenditure on the new National Health Service and post-war reconstruction. This made the currency less stable and, coupled with the emergence of the dollar as the currency of choice for foreign reserves, led the government to slash the Bretton Woods official exchange rate from $4.03 to $2.80. This was a major event in Britain's decline from superpower status. With the country struggling to feed its people at home and those it was responsible for in war-torn Europe, it also caused the US to take a greater interest in Europe and push through the Marshall Plan for assistance to Britain and the continent. In addition, the winter is cited as the reason for the emigration of thousands of British people, particularly to Australia. The winter as a whole was less cold than the winter of 1963 but more snow was recorded.

== Outside the United Kingdom ==
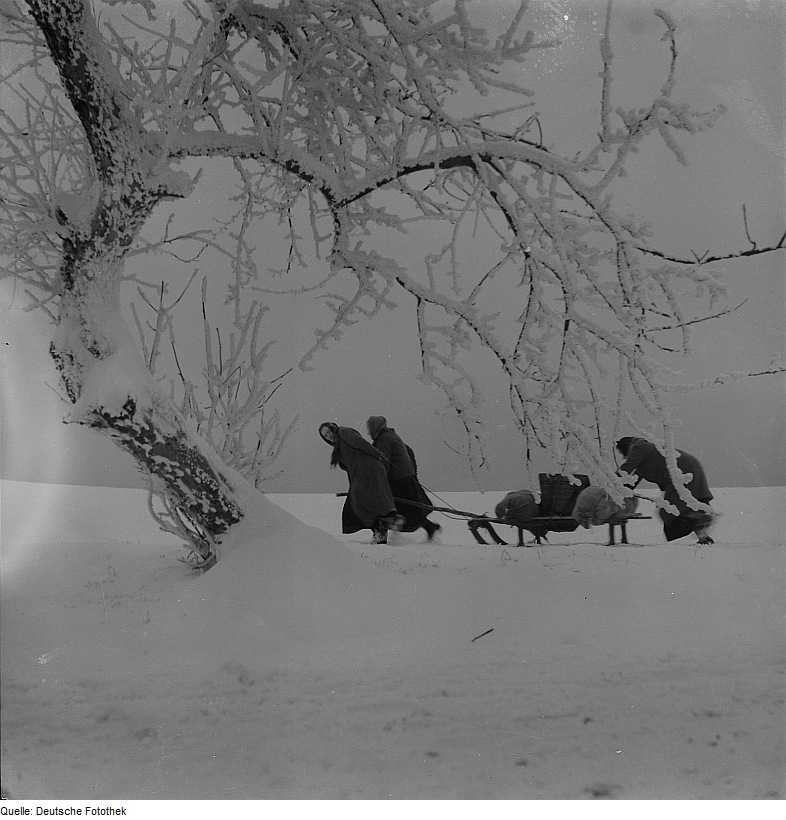
Women in Germany collecting fuel in 1946

The winter affected many other European countries. Similar cold periods and snowfalls were seen in much of Central Europe and the southern Baltic region. De Bilt, near Amsterdam in the Netherlands, experienced its worst winter since 1790. Because of the anticyclone to the north of the United Kingdom, several incoming Atlantic depressions which would otherwise have hit Britain tracked south to the Mediterranean region, resulting in Portugal, Spain, and Southern France having more rain than usual while remaining relatively warm. For example, the February rainfall at Gibraltar was 9.3 inches (240 mm), three times the average. As a result, France experienced both the extreme cold in the north and much rain in the south. The winter caused 150 deaths from the cold and lack of food in Berlin, which was still recovering from its devastation during the final stages of the Second World War. It caused schools in the Netherlands to be closed, led to a mob attack on a goods train carrying coal in Copenhagen, and caused the closure of businesses and the restriction of domestic gas supplies in Ireland.

== See also ==
- Weather of 1946
- 1947 in the United Kingdom
- 1947 Thames flood
- 1947 English cricket season, in what was called a "glorious summer"
- Winter of 1962–1963 in the United Kingdom
- Winter of Discontent, 1978–1979
- 1987 United Kingdom and Ireland cold wave
- Winter of 1990–91 in Western Europe

== Bibliography ==
- Burroughs, William James (1997), Does the Weather Really Matter?, Cambridge: Cambridge University Press, ISBN 0-521-56126-4
- Eden, Philip. Great British weather disasters (Continuum, 2009).
- Howorth, B., et al. "The spring floods of 1947." Journal of the Institution of Water Engineers 2.1 (1948): 12–35.
- Jones, C. A., S. J. Davies, and N. Macdonald. "Examining the social consequences of extreme weather: the outcomes of the 1946/1947 winter in upland Wales, UK." Climatic change 113.1 (2012): 35–53. online
- Kaiser, Robert G. Cold Winter, Cold War (Scarborough House, 1974).
- Kynaston, David. Austerity Britain, 1945–1951 (2008) pp 185–205.
- Marr, Andrew (2007), A History of Modern Britain, Pan, ISBN 978-0-330-43983-1
- Middlemas, Keith (April 1990), "Review of The Bleak Midwinter, 1947", The English Historical Review, 105 (415): 548–549, doi:10.1093/ehr/CV.CCCCXV.548, JSTOR 571001
- Robertson, Alex J. The Bleak Midwinter, 1947 (Manchester University Press, 1989), The standard scholarly history.
