= 1947 Thames flood =

1947 natural disaster in England

Coordinates: 51.5°N 1.0°W

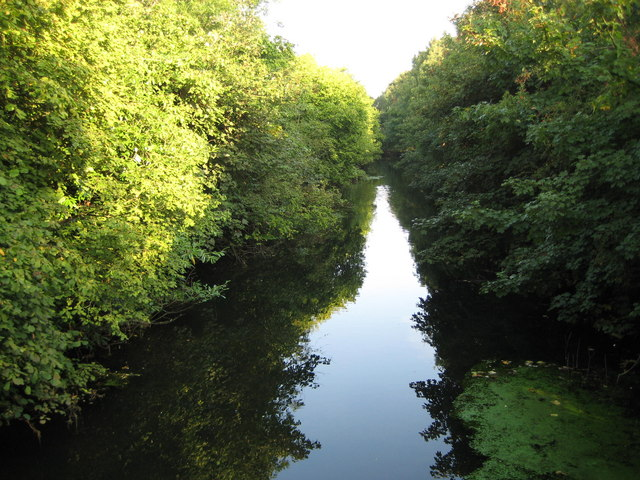
Maidenhead Flood Relief Channel was built after Maidenhead was flooded in 1947 and again in 1954.

The 1947 Thames flood was the most severe flood of the River Thames in the 20th century, affecting much of the Thames Valley as well as elsewhere in England during the middle of March 1947 after a severe winter. The worst in over 100 years, it was exacerbated by an extremely high tide.

== Background ==
Without the military to carry out rescue work, emergency flood-control measures, and other tasks occasioned by floods, the toll of destruction to lives and property would undoubtedly have been much higher than it was.

— Alex J. Robertson

The source of the Thames is in Gloucestershire, and it flows east through Oxfordshire. Records have been kept of its water levels since 1893.

In January 1947, the country—particularly the southeast—had been hit by blizzards, which were severe enough to freeze the upper reaches of the River Thames. Winter storms continued into February. Before the flooding, 117 mm (4.6 inches) of precipitation and snow had fallen; the peak flow was 61.7 billion litres of water per day and the damage cost a total of £12 million to repair. The heavy snow had been followed by a period of relatively warm weather, which caused the snow to quickly melt on top of the still-frozen ground, which meant it had nowhere to drain. War damage to some locks made matters worse. Maidenhead was particularly badly damaged, with over 2,000 dwellings flooded.

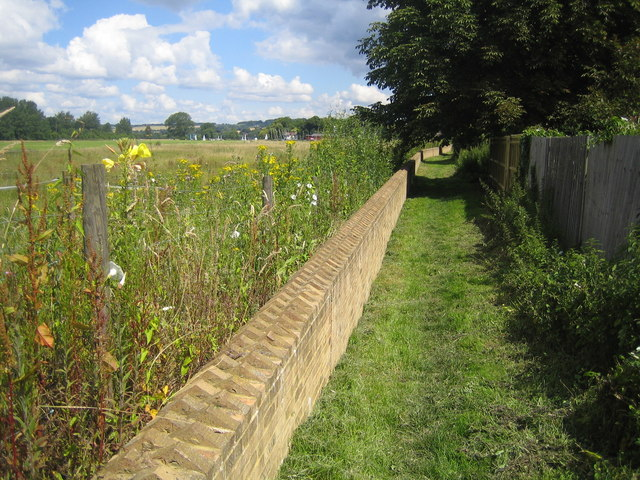
Cookham was flooded in 1947. This flood defence wall was constructed in 2002 to defend the town from the river on the left.

The same weather conditions caused widespread flooding to many river basins in the country during March 1947. Although there were no deaths as a consequence of the flooding, the shock value was sufficient to put flooding on the political agenda.

== Aftermath ==
Other significant Thames floods since 1947 have occurred in 1968, 1993, 1998, 2000, 2003, 2007 and 2014.

Following the 1947 flood, a recent commentator has suggested, the Borough of Windsor and Maidenhead—having been particularly heavily hit—"judged that the zoning regulation after 1947 would cause the area to become derelict and destroy its amenities".

It is considered a 1/60 year-occurrence event.

The flood of 1947 is considered as being instrumental in formulating major government policy developments regarding flood control.

== See also ==
- 1928 Thames flood
- Winter of 1946–1947 in the United Kingdom
- Great Flood of 1968
- The Cut-off Channel
