= So Well Remembered =

- Theatrical poster
- Directed by: Edward Dmytryk
- Screenplay by: John Paxton
- Based on: So Well Remembered; 1945 novel by James Hilton
- Produced by: Adrian Scott; J. Arthur Rank
- Starring: John Mills; Martha Scott; Trevor Howard
- Cinematography: Freddie Young
- Edited by: Harry W. Gerstad
- Music by: Hanns Eisler
- Production companies: Alliance Productions; RKO Radio British Productions
- Distributed by: RKO Radio Pictures
- Release dates: 8 July 1947 (UK); 4 November 1947 (US)
- Running time: 114 minutes
- Country: United Kingdom
- Language: English
- Budget: $1.5 million

So Well Remembered is a 1947 British drama film directed by Edward Dmytryk and starring John Mills, Martha Scott, and Trevor Howard. The film was based on James Hilton's 1945 novel of the same title and tells the story of a reformer and the woman he marries in a fictional mill town in Lancashire. Hilton also narrates the film. It was shot on location in England. It is faithful to the novel in many particulars, but the motives of the main female character and the tone of the ending are considerably altered.

The first screening was in the Majestic Theatre in Macclesfield on 9 August 1947. At some stage the film disappeared before being rediscovered in 2013 in Tennessee by Muttley McLad of the band The Macc Lads.

== Plot ==
At the end of the Second World War, George Boswell (John Mills), a town councillor, newspaper editor and zealous reformer in the mill town of Browdley in Lancashire, recalls the past 26 years of his life.

In 1919 he defends Olivia Channing (Martha Scott) when she applies for a library job. Her father, the mill owner John Channing (Frederick Leister), went to prison for almost 20 years for speculating with, and losing, many townspeople's money. George falls in love with Olivia, though it scandalises the town, and he eventually proposes to her. That night she has an argument with her father. He has Dr Richard Whiteside (Trevor Howard) drive him into town to speak to George, but they crash on a washed-out road and John is killed. Olivia then agrees to marry George.

Trevor Mangin (Reginald Tate), Browdley's most influential businessman, asks George to run for Parliament. Seeing an opportunity to further his reforming efforts, George agrees, much to Olivia's delight.

Whiteside brings George an alarming report about the danger of an epidemic in the town's filthy slums. Mangin, who owns many of them, produces a more optimistic report. Given that Whiteside has taken to drinking heavily since the accident, George accepts Mangin's report, causing the council to vote to do nothing. However, a diphtheria epidemic breaks out, just as Whiteside feared. A free clinic is opened to inoculate the healthy children and treat the sick. George tells Olivia to take their son there, but she cannot bear to do so among the town's poor, and the boy dies.

After George drops out of the election because of Mangin's lies Olivia tells him that she is leaving him. George realises that she married him solely for his prospects. They go their separate ways. He eventually rises to the mayoralty of the town, while she remarries a rich man and has another son, Charles Winslow (Richard Carlson). Meanwhile, Whiteside takes in a baby girl, Julie Morgan (Patricia Roc), orphaned at birth, and George helps to raise her.

Many years pass. Early in the Second World War a widowed Olivia returns, takes up residence in her father's mansion and reopens the Channing mill. Her son becomes a flier in the Royal Air Force. On leave he meets Julie and they fall in love, but Olivia does not want to relinquish her control over her son. Charles is seriously injured in combat and his face is disfigured. This enables Olivia to isolate him until George manages to convince him to break free and marry Julie. When Olivia arrives, looking for her son, George reveals that he has worked out that Olivia did nothing to prevent her father from driving to his death, though she must have known that the road was washed out. Whiteside had overheard the Channings arguing and knew that John Channing intended to warn George against her.

== Cast ==
- John Mills as George Boswell
- Martha Scott as Olivia Channing Boswell
- Patricia Roc as Julie Morgan
- Trevor Howard as Dr Richard Whiteside
- Richard Carlson as Charles Winslow
- Reginald Tate as Trevor Mangin
- Beatrice Varley as Annie, George's loyal servant
- Frederick Leister as John Channing
- Ivor Barnard as Spivey
- Julian D'Albie as Wetherall, outgoing Member of Parliament
- Arthur Howard as Politician
- Juliet Mills as Young Julie
- Roddy Hughes as Chief Librarian
- John Turnbull as Morris
- Wylie Watson as Councillor Alstock
- Hayley Mills as Infant
- Fred Griffiths as Mill Worker
- Lyonel Watts as Mayor
- Kathleen Boutall as Woman
- Joan Hickson as Mother
- Stanley Van Beers as Butler
- John Salew as Man Addressing Council Meeting
- Johnnie Schofield as 1st Publican
- Cyril Smith as 2nd Publican

== Production ==
The film was mainly shot at Denham Film Studios in Denham, Buckinghamshire. Exteriors were filmed in Macclesfield, Cheshire, forming the backdrop of a Lancashire mill town. Mills's daughters Juliet and Hayley played Julie as a young girl and a baby respectively. The music for the film was composed by Hanns Eisler. The film's sets were designed by the art director Lawrence P. Williams.

== Reception ==
=== Critical ===
Bosley Crowther lavished praise on the film in his November 5, 1947 review for The New York Times: "A story which the book reviewers warned us was disappointing and dull, … has been miraculously transmuted into an affecting and fascinating tale in the motion picture….It has also been turned into a drama of inspiration and significance to those of us troubled mortals who live in this uncertain world…. As now told, it is the story of the struggles of a small humanitarian—a newspaper editor and town councilor in a drab Lancashire mill town—not only against the forces of inhuman commercial greed but mainly against the persuasions and obstructions of his selfish and ambitious wife...he first grasps the nature of her voracity when she takes the reactionary side against his tireless efforts to obtain better housing and sanitation for the town. And then, years later… he patiently triumphs over her selfish maneuvers to smother and possess (her own) war-maimed son. …it conspicuously lacks identification with the large issues and personalities in Britain between two wars. But certainly the fundamental conflict between the ideal of human welfare and the rot of greed has been vividly kept in the foreground by John Paxton… And the natures and credibility of the characters have been consistently proportioned throughout …. Mr. Dmytryk, working in conjunction with Adrian Scott, … has accomplished a superior creation in the realistic style.” Crowther praised the actors, including the “smaller parts (which) are, as usual, sharply played. In pictorial nature and, especially, in the social sincerity of its theme, So Well Remembered makes a strong bid for a memorable place beside The Stars Look Down and The Citadel, two previous British-made films we won't forget."

Virginia Graham's July 17, 1947 review in The Spectator took the opposite tack: "this film is quite astonishingly boring. Taken from James Hilton's novel, it seems to have lost all the drama it should have retained and to have retained all the verbiage it should have lost.. ..people do not talk as they do in books, not even Mr. Hilton's books,… it is very unusual for a man to say more than four sentences at a time without interruption; but (this film) is liberally dosed …with phrases so lengthily and beautifully formulated as to be altogether out of this world.“ As to the performances: “….Everybody knows John Mills has enough charm to knock the birds off the trees, and so has Trevor Howard, but… they are only allowed a very few feet of charm. The years change them almost unrecognisably, Mr. Mills looking more and more like Charles Ruggles and Mr. Trevor more and more like Sir Aubrey Smith as the minutes tortoise by. And they are infinitely duller. Martha Scott has an unpleasant part which she plays with spirit….Although I may be the last critic to pen it, I would like to record that I, too, thought of saying that So Well Remembered will be So Easily Forgotten, that I, too, have my moments of lightning wit in the bath."

=== Box office ===
According to trade papers, the film was a "notable box office attraction" at British cinemas in 1947. Nevertheless, it recorded a loss of $378,000.

Dore Schary, then head of RKO, said that he did not release the film when he was in charge of the studio "because I thought it was a stinker".

== See also ==
- List of British films of 1947
