= Trevor Blades =

English cricketer

Personal information
- Full name: Trevor George Blades
- Born: 22 June 1947 (age 79); Peterborough, Cambridgeshire, England
- Batting: Right-handed
- Role: Wicket-keeper

Domestic team information
- Years: Team
- 1969–1977: Lincolnshire

Career statistics
Competition	List A
Matches	2
Runs scored	52
Batting average	52.00
100s/50s	–/–
Top score	50*
Balls bowled	–
Wickets	–
Bowling average	–
5 wickets in innings	–
10 wickets in match	–
Best bowling	–
Catches/stumpings	2/1
- Source: Cricinfo, 25 June 2011

Trevor George Blades (born 22 June 1947) is a former English cricketer. Blades was a right-handed batsman who fielded as a wicket-keeper. He was born in Peterborough, Cambridgeshire.

Blades made his debut for Lincolnshire in the 1969 Minor Counties Championship against Staffordshire. Blades played Minor counties cricket for Lincolnshire from 1969 to 1977, which included 26 Minor Counties Championship matches. He made his List A debut against Glamorgan in the 1st round of the 1974 Gillette Cup.

He took a single catch and made a single stumping in the Glamorgans innings, while in the Lincolnshire innings he scored 50 not out to help guide Lincolnshire to a famous 6 wicket victory against their first-class opponents. He played a further List A match for Lincolnshire against Surrey in the following round. In this match, he took a single catch, while with the bat he scored 2 runs before being dismissed by Geoff Arnold, with Surrey winning by 123 runs.
