= List of British films of 1947 =

A list of films produced in the United Kingdom in 1947:

Title	Director	Cast	Genre	Notes
1947
Black Memory	Oswald Mitchell	Michael Medwin, Sid James, Gerald Pring	Crime	
Black Narcissus	Michael Powell, Emeric Pressburger	Deborah Kerr, David Farrar, Kathleen Byron	Thriller	Number 44 in the list of BFI Top 100 British films
Brighton Rock	John Boulting	Richard Attenborough, Carol Marsh, Hermione Baddeley	Crime drama	Number 15 in the list of BFI Top 100 British films
The Brothers	David MacDonald	Patricia Roc, Will Fyffe, Finlay Currie	Drama	
Bush Christmas	Ralph Smart	Chris Rafferty	Comedy	
Captain Boycott	Frank Launder	Stewart Granger, Kathleen Ryan, Cecil Parker	Historical	
Code of Scotland Yard	George King	Oskar Homolka, Muriel Pavlow, Derek Farr	Crime	
The Courtneys of Curzon Street	Herbert Wilcox	Anna Neagle, Michael Wilding, Michael Medwin	Drama	
Dancing with Crime	John Paddy Carstairs	Richard Attenborough, Barry K. Barnes, Sheila Sim	Mystery	
Dear Murderer	Arthur Crabtree	Eric Portman, Greta Gynt, Dennis Price	Thriller	
Death in High Heels	Lionel Tomlinson	Don Stannard, Veronica Rose, Patricia Laffan	Crime	
Dual Alibi	Alfred Travers	Herbert Lom, Phyllis Dixey, Terence De Marney	Crime	
The End of the River	Derek Twist	Sabu, Bibi Ferreira, Esmond Knight	Drama	
Eyes That Kill	Richard M. Grey	Robert Berkeley, Sandra Dorne	Crime	
Fame Is the Spur	Roy Boulting	Michael Redgrave, Rosamund John	Political drama	
The Foxes of Harrow	John M. Stahl	Rex Harrison, Maureen O'Hara, Richard Haydn	Adventure	Co-production with the U.S.
Frieda	Basil Dearden	David Farrar, Glynis Johns, Mai Zetterling	Drama	
The Ghosts of Berkeley Square	Vernon Sewell	Robert Morley, Felix Aylmer	Comedy	
Green Fingers	John Harlow	Robert Beatty, Carol Raye	Drama	
The Hangman Waits	A. Barr-Smith	John Turnbull, Beatrice Campbell	Drama	
The Hills of Donegal	John Argyle	Dinah Sheridan, Moore Marriott	Drama	
Holiday Camp	Ken Annakin	Dennis Price, Jack Warner	Comedy/drama	
Hue and Cry	Charles Crichton	Alastair Sim, Harry Fowler	Comedy	
Hungry Hill	Brian Desmond Hurst	Margaret Lockwood, Dennis Price	Drama	
An Ideal Husband	Alexander Korda	Paulette Goddard, Michael Wilding	Comedy	Based on the play by Oscar Wilde
It Always Rains on Sunday	Robert Hamer	Googie Withers, Edward Chapman	Drama	
Jassy	Bernard Knowles	Margaret Lockwood, Patricia Roc, Dennis Price	Drama romance	Shot in Technicolor
Just William's Luck	Val Guest	William Graham, Garry Marsh, Jane Welsh	Comedy	
The Life and Adventures of Nicholas Nickleby	Alberto Cavalcanti	Stanley Holloway, Cedric Hardwicke	Drama	
The Loves of Joanna Godden	Charles Frend	Googie Withers, Jean Kent	Historical/drama	
A Man About the House	Leslie Arliss	Dulcie Gray, Margaret Johnston, Kieron Moore	Drama	
The Man Within	Bernard Knowles	Michael Redgrave, Jean Kent	Historical drama	
The Mark of Cain	Brian Desmond Hurst	Eric Portman, Sally Gray	Crime	
Master of Bankdam	Walter Forde	Anne Crawford, Dennis Price	Drama	
Meet Me at Dawn	Peter Creswell, Thornton Freeland	William Eythe, Stanley Holloway	Comedy/adventure	
Mine Own Executioner	Anthony Kimmins	Burgess Meredith, Dulcie Gray	Drama	
Mrs. Fitzherbert	Montgomery Tully	Peter Graves, Joyce Howard	Historical	
The Mysterious Mr. Nicholson	Oswald Mitchell	Anthony Hulme, Lesley Osmond	Crime	
Night Beat	Harold Huth	Anne Crawford, Maxwell Reed	Crime/drama	
The October Man	Roy Ward Baker	John Mills, Joan Greenwood	Mystery	
Odd Man Out	Carol Reed	James Mason, Robert Newton, Cyril Cusack	Drama	
The Phantom Shot	Mario Zampi	John Stuart, Olga Lindo	Mystery	
The Root of All Evil	Brock Williams	Phyllis Calvert, Michael Rennie	Drama	
The Shop at Sly Corner	George King	Oskar Homolka, Kenneth Griffith	Crime Drama	
The Silver Darlings	Clarence Elder	Clifford Evans, Helen Shingler	Drama	
So Well Remembered	Edward Dmytryk	John Mills, Martha Scott	Drama	
Take My Life	Ronald Neame	Hugh Williams, Greta Gynt	Thriller	
Temptation Harbour	Lance Comfort	Robert Newton, Simone Simon	Crime	
They Made Me a Fugitive	Alberto Cavalcanti	Trevor Howard, Sally Gray	Film noir	
Things Happen at Night	Francis Searle	Gordon Harker, Alfred Drayton	Comedy	
The Turners of Prospect Road	Maurice J. Wilson	Wilfrid Lawson, Helena Pickard	Comedy/drama	
Uncle Silas	Charles Frank	Jean Simmons, Katina Paxinou	Drama	
The Upturned Glass	Lawrence Huntington	James Mason, Rosamund John	Drama	
When the Bough Breaks	Lawrence Huntington	Patricia Roc, Rosamund John	Drama	
While I Live	John Harlow	Tom Walls, Sonia Dresdel, Carol Raye	Drama	
While the Sun Shines	Anthony Asquith	Barbara White, Ronald Squire	Comedy	
White Cradle Inn	Harold French	Madeleine Carroll, Ian Hunter	Drama	
The White Unicorn	Bernard Knowles	Margaret Lockwood, Joan Greenwood	Drama	
The Woman in the Hall	Jack Lee	Ursula Jeans, Jean Simmons	Drama	
Woman to Woman	Maclean Rogers	Douglass Montgomery, Joyce Howard	Drama	

== See also ==
- 1947 in British music
- 1947 in British television
- 1947 in the United Kingdom
