= Keith Middlemas =

Robert Middlemas
- Born: Robert Keith Middlemas; 26 May 1935; Alnwick, Northumberland
- Died: 10 July 2013 (aged 78); West Burton, Sussex
- Education: Stowe School
- Writing career
- Years active: 1969–2013
- Genre: Modern European political history

Robert Keith Middlemas (26 May 1935 – 10 July 2013) was an English historian, known for works on modern European political history.

== Life ==
Middlemas was born in Alnwick, Northumberland on 26 May 1935. He was educated at Stowe School and then joined the Northumberland Fusiliers, before entering Pembroke College, Cambridge, graduating with a first class degree in history.

Entering the Civil Service, Middlemas worked as a House of Commons clerk for nine years. From 1967 he was a lecturer at the University of Sussex. He became a reader there in 1976, and Professor in 1986.

Middlemas published 21 books.

He died at West Burton, Sussex on 10 July 2013.

== Bibliography ==
Middlemas published 21 books:

=== Political biographies ===
- The Life and Times of Edward VII (1972)
- Baldwin: A Biography (1969), co-written with John Barnes
- The Life And Times Of George VI (1974)

=== European politics ===
- Orchestrating Europe: The Informal Politics Of The European Union, 1973 95
- Diplomacy of Illusion: The British Government and Germany, 1937-1939 (1972)
- Politics in Industrial Society: The Experience of the British System Since 1911 (1979)
- Power and the Party: Changing Faces of Communism in Western Europe (1980)

=== Other ===
- Continental Coloured Glass (1971)
- Antique Colored Glass
- Power, Competition And The State (1971)
- Cabora Bassa: Engineering And Politics In Southern Africa (1975)
- The Double Market: Art Theft And Art Thieves (1975)
- Pursuit of Pleasure: High Society in the 1900s (1977)
- As They Really Were: The Citizens of Alnwick 1831 (2012)
- Industry, Unions and Government: Twenty-One Years of Nedc (1983)
- Kinship and Survival: The Middlemas Name Through 600 Years (1990)
