= Ernest Austin =

English composer, music arranger and editor

Ernest John Austin (31 December 1874 – 24 July 1947) was an English composer, music arranger and editor. Although little-remembered today (he does not even have an entry in the comprehensive New Grove dictionary), Austin's orchestral music enjoyed some success in its own time, including performances at the Henry Wood Promenade Concerts and on BBC Radio during the 1920s. He was a prolific composer of songs, covering a wide spectrum of mood, from serious Shakespearean settings to ballads of both sentimental and robust natures. He found some success writing piano pieces and unison songs for children. He also made piano transcriptions of the work of other composers, a particularly common practice of the time.

== Life and works ==
He was born Ernest John Austin in Poplar, London (now in the borough of Tower Hamlets), the son of Elizabeth and William Austin, a shirt tailor. Ernest Austin was the younger brother of baritone and composer Frederic Austin (1872–1951).

He first worked for the Board of Trade and then pursued a career in business. Largely self-taught, by 1902 he had composed a piano sextet (first performed in 1910) and by the age of about 30 he had turned to music as a career. He worked as a copy-editor and reviser for the London music publisher Robert Elkin (Elkin & Co.), where he edited some of Cyril Scott's piano works for publication. According to Austin, Scott's manuscripts were not always legible, and "the published result was occasionally his personal 'best guess' as to the intentions of the composer."

He gave a concert of his own works in November 1908 in Wallington, London, including two Piano Trios (No. 2, Op.15, and No. 4), his brother Frederic Austin singing some songs along with Miss Grainger-Kerr (also a proponent of Cyril Scott's vocal works); a Piano Trio was also performed in November 1909. Austin was described as being "well known as an apostle of modernism" (Note: The term was used in the same sense as a description of Vaughan Williams's first string quartet (also published in 1909) as "the extreme development of modernism". Source:Ling, John (November 2014). The debate in England on the progress and regress of music, 1888–1907 (Ph.D. thesis). p. 193n.) in a review of his Songs From The Highway, also published in 1909: "In his case the tendency manifests itself in the form of indefinite tonality and rhythm. 'Love's Tragedy', for instance, [...] is practically unbarred, and the accentuation is left to the discrimination of the singer, with whom it is to be hoped the accompanist will be in sympathy."

He had a passable baritone voice, and performed Norman O'Neill's setting of Keats's La Belle Sans Merci for baritone and orchestra at the Queen's Hall on 27 January 1910.

Another concert devoted to his own piano works and songs was given at St. James's Hall, London in November 1910; the solo pianist was Ernest Lees, the singers were Cecily Gleeson-White, Miss Grainger-Kerr, William Higley (who sang the title role in The Flying Dutchman at the Proms in 1905) and Frederic Austin, accompanied by Harold Brooke (professional pianist and editor at Novello & Co. who worked with Elgar on the publication of his Piano Quintet).

A considerable proportion of his output consisted of short piano pieces and unison songs suitable for children, and in an advertisement for his music in 1916 it was thought that "more than doubtful whether he has a rival among modern British composers who specialise in educational music."

The orchestral suite Stella-Mary Dances was written in memory of his oldest daughter who died in 1917, aged 12. They were played (along with his Vicar of Bray variations) on BBC Radio on 15 November 1929; the broadcast was followed by a concert of music from The Beggar's Opera by his brother Frederic, who also conducted.

The Pilgrim's Progress by Ernest Austin
Part of 12th movement: trumpet fanfares on the organ and choir singing. Played by Kevin Bowyer

One of his best-known works is The Pilgrim's Progress, a 12-section narrative tone poem setting for a solo organ of the work by John Bunyan; it takes about 2¾ hours to perform. There is a text which explains what is happening at each stage of the music which can be read by a narrator, and in the 12th movement, there are optional parts for choir (SSATTB), bells, and a solo violin. It was revived in November 1988 at St. Michael's, Cornhill, London, by organist Kevin Bowyer, who continues to perform it on occasion.

The song Farewell by Havergal Brian from his Op. 6 (Three Songs for contralto or baritone) - his first surviving work, from 1902 - was dedicated to Austin, as was Battle Song, from 6 Characteristic Songs, Op. 22, by Joseph Holbrooke.

== Thoughts on music for children ==
From a letter by Austin to The Musical Times in 1918 about the piano music for the Associated Board exams:

"I close with an appeal to teachers. The future of English music rests with your pupils. These children are being trained for the ultimate purposes of deriving personal delight from the art and giving it to others. If the music they study gives them no pleasure, if they miss intimacy with the composer's idea—then it is so much wasted time. If you demand, as you have a right to demand, the right kind of music for them, you will get it. Publishers are in business to supply what you most need, but your needs must be known to them. Children have a good deal of latent romance and poetic insight, and music can bring this out and develop it with magical swiftness. By feeding every poetic tendency, often very personal and original, you will be building up, in each of them, a love for beauty which will never leave them. That would be great work, for what else is this life-quest in which we are all engaged? Do we get a fraction of the delight in living that we feel we are justly entitled to? Those of us who live on, bearing the inevitable blows of sorrow, (Note: His 12 year-old daughter Stella Mary had died the previous year.) can turn to music and other forms of Beauty and find in them the secret compensations of the Creator. Our children have the same road to travel, and they also must be prepared."

== Family ==
He was married twice, firstly to Stella Reeve Muskett (b. 1874—d. Wallington, April or May 1925), with whom he had two daughters, Stella Mary (died 30 May 1917, aged 12; his orchestral suite Stella-Mary Dances, Op.58, was composed in her memory): and Margaret (1912-?). He married secondly Nell (maiden name unknown), died 12 April 1934.

== Selected works ==
=== Orchestra ===
- March for a Pageant (1910)
- Variations on The Vicar of Bray, Op.35, for string orchestra (FP the Proms 1910, also conducted by Austin at a Prom on 9 October 1913) Also arraranged for solo piano
- Stella-Mary Dances, Op.58, orchestral suite (1918, played at the Proms)
- Sweet Night, for flute, clarinet, cornet, and string orchestra
- Symphony (Note: Although Ernest Austin is mentioned in passing (in various books and internet sites) as having written a symphony, there seem to be few (if any) contemporary reviews or reports of a performance of such a work. There may be some confusion with the Symphony in E Minor by his brother Frederic Austin; or with The Pilgrim's Progress, sometimes described as a symphonic poem for organ; or with an arrangement for piano of another work such as Schubert's 8th Symphony, arr. Landon Ronald and Ernest Austin.)

=== Chamber ===
- Sextet for two violins, cello, clarinet, horn and piano (1902)
- 5 Piano Trios for violin, cello and piano (with optional parts for flute and French horn)
  - Trio No. 2 In Field and Forest, Op.15, (c1908)
  - Trio No. 4, Op.26, (1909)
  - Trio No. 5, Folk Tune Fantasy, Op.65
- Music-poem for violin and piano, Op.29
- Lyric Sonata, Op.70, for violin and piano (1925)

=== Organ ===
- The Pilgrim's Progress, Op.41; 12-movement narrative tone poem in 4 parts, with optional choir (SSATTB), bells, solo violin and narrator (1912–1920).

=== Piano ===
- Sonata No.1, Op.1 (privately printed)
- Sonata No.2, Op.31
- 12 Simple Sonatinas on national themes, 2 Books, Op.38 (c1911)
- Folk Tune Studies in variation form (First Book), Op.42 - Primary Grade (English Fingering) (Note: There was a movement against the German system of fingering (and all things German) during the First World War. Levi, Erik (2016). "Those damn foreigners: Xenophobia and British musical life during the first half of the twentieth century". In Fairclough, Pauline (ed.). Twentieth-Century Music and Politics: Essays in Memory of Neil Edmunds. Routledge. p. 82. ISBN 9781317005803.)
- Suites: 4 English Pastorals, Op.43 (1915); To Music (7 movements); Under Blue Skies; 6 Dream Themes (Op. 74); around 25 Tone Stanzas (1908–1924)
- 2 books of Preludes, Op.56
- Indian Pipe Dance (1921)
- 14 Sonatinas for children, on English folk-songs
- Through the Eyes of Youth
- Diversions: eight pieces for piano (1928)
- Four Pastorals, Op. 71
- Moods and Melodies: Seven easy pieces, Op.72
- Dream Themes, Book 1, Op.74
- Piano Pieces, Op.81
- The Garden of Music, (editor), a series of grade pieces by various composers
- Transcriptions of songs by Edward Elgar for solo piano, Sevillana, Mot d'Amour, Like to the damask rose, Queen Mary's song, A song of Autumn (1926)
- Transcription for piano of the Minuet from Elgar's incidental music to a play about Beau Brummell, by Bertram P. Matthews (1928)

=== Songs ===
Collections and song-cycles

- Songs of Love and Nature, Op.2. 1. Shepherd's Love Song (words by Austin); 2. Sweet Night (H. E. Hunt); 3. A Morning Song (G. Lees)
- A Sheaf of Songs, Op.6 (1907) (5) (inc. Two Songs of Rest, words by Austin)
- Songs from the Highway, Op.16 (1909) 1. Love's Uncertainty (words by Austin); 2. Love's Tragedy (Austin); 3. Chloris Walking in the Snow (words by William Strode); 4. Hospital Song; 5. In April; 6. O Sad Day (Austin)
- Songs from the Ravel, Op.30 (1907) (Words for Musical Setting.) A Book of Prose-Lyrics from Life and Nature.
- Six Silly Songs for Sensible Children (1924) ("Words and music by Ernest Austin's friend Ernest Bryson, and by Ernest Bryson's friend Ernest Austin")

Individual songs

Aspiration; Fountain Song; I Made Thee Mine; The Infinite Voice; Life; Sigh No More Ladies (also arr. violin or cello, and piano); April Wears a Smiling Face; Tony the Turtle; Cradle Song; Sea Dogs; Sleep Little Rose; Sweet Night; The Woodland Tailor; A Song of Folly; Thoughts (vocal setting of Brahms's waltz, op.39 no.15)

=== Choral ===
- With organ: Communion service in G (1912)
- With orchestra:
  - Gelert, Op.11, dramatic legend (1908);
  - Hymn of Apollo (words by Percy Shelley) (fp 1917, by the Leeds Choral Union cond. by Dr. Henry Coward), repeated the next year Also given by the Glasgow Choral and Orchestral Union in the autumn of 1919 under Landon Ronald, and again in 1922
  - Ode to a Grecian Urn (Shelley)
- 8-part chorus: Hymn to the night (words by Henry Longfellow) (performed in Leeds, 12 March 1919)
- Female voices: The Dream Maker; Shed No Tear (SSAA)
- Male voices: Home on the Range (cowboy song)
- Unison songs for children, inc. Op.3 and Op. 69

=== Books ===
- The Story of Music Printing (1913)
- The Fairyland of Music (1922); subtitled 'A fairy story with music'.
