= Pop music in Taiwan =

Popular music produced in Taiwan

Taiwanese pop music
- Other names: T-pop
- Stylistic origins: Pop; rock; Indorock
- Cultural origins: Early 20th century, Taiwan

Taiwanese pop music, also known as T-pop, refers to commercially produced pop music originating in Taiwan or performed by Taiwanese artists and groups.

== Terminology ==
Taiwanese pop is an umbrella term that includes several genres and musical traditions associated with Taiwan’s popular music industry. These include Mandopop, Taigipop, Campus folk song, Taiwanese hip hop, Taiwanese Indigenous pop music, and Taiwanese rock.

The term is not limited to songs performed in a single language. Taiwanese pop music may be sung in Taiwanese Mandarin, Taiwanese Hokkien, Hakka, Indigenous Taiwanese languages, Japanese, or other languages used by Taiwanese artists. It generally refers to pop music produced in Taiwan or associated with Taiwan's music industry.

== History ==
=== Origins under Japanese rule ===
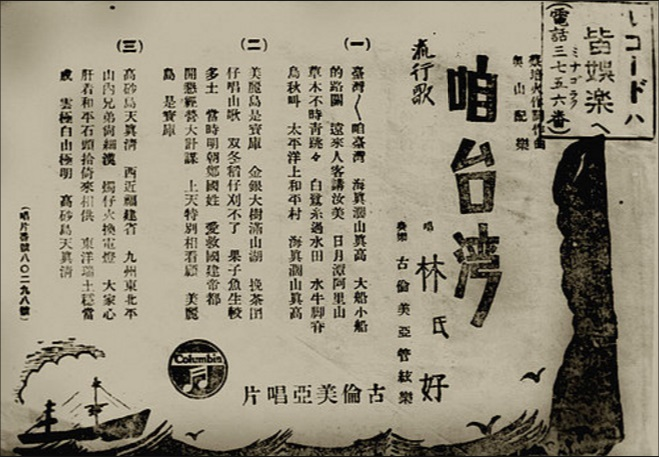
Original lyrics sheet of Taiwan—Our Beautiful Island.

Commercial popular music first developed in Taiwan during the period of Japanese rule (1895–1945). Taiwanese popular music developed largely as a result of the interactions between existing Taiwanese performance traditions and the commercial recording industry, specifically within the context of 78-rpm records, which were one of the main vessels of music distribution at the time. Early recordings drew on genres such as Taiwanese opera, Hakka instrumental music, tea-picking opera, beiguan, and nanguan. From the late 1920s, record companies began adapting these traditions by adding Western instruments and jazz-style accompaniments. The 78-rpm record allowed music as a whole to become more widely distributed, and as a result, Taiwanese music had the opportunity to redefine itself. The gramophone mainly contributed to the development of Taiwan's popular-music industry by transforming musical performances in reproducible commercial products. Japanese record companies initially sold imported Japanese and Chinese recordings in Taiwan, but they soon began recording local repertoire in order to reach Taiwanese consumers. Around the 1930s, major Japanese and international labels (such as Columbia Records (Taiwan) and Nipponophone) established local operations or active distribution in Taipei. This opened the gates for new music productions and ways of listening. The records also led to the introductions of foreign influences in Taiwanese music, for example foxtrot, jazz or Japanese ryūkōka.

Many early recordings were also performed in Taiwanese Hokkien. Between 1931 and 1932, musicians also wrote new Taiwanese lyrics for existing Hokkien, Japanese, Chinese, and other popular melodies. Nipponophone's decision to record Taiwanese music was partly motivated by growing demand for records, as well as the difficulty many Taiwanese listeners had understanding and relating to other languages' lyrics. Taiwan's Hokkien- and Hakka- speaking communities also connected the island to markets in Southeast Asia, giving Taiwanese recordings potential value beyond the domestic market. As companies competed for these audiences, they increasingly produced Taiwanese-language songs and adapted local theatrical and folk traditions for commercial release. By late 1932, composers were increasingly writing new melodies and lyrics, specifically for recording and designing songs to fit one side of a 78-rpm disc. Western influence also entered through recording technology, electrical recording, jazz orchestras, Western instruments, and commercial production practices, but were combined with Taiwanese melodies, languages, and performance, traditions. By the 1930s, Columbia's Literature and Art Department actively recruited composers, lyricists, and singers to develop new Taiwanese popular music.

One of the earliest commercially released Taiwanese popular songs was March of the Black Cats, issued in 1929. Sung by Chiu-chan, the recording combined elements of Taiwanese opera with Western orchestral accompaniment. In 1932, singer Sun-sun recorded a promotional song connected to the film The Peach Girl, which became widely known in Taiwan.

In 1933, Taiwan—Our Beautiful Island was released by Columbia Records. The song was written by activist Tshuà Pôe-hué and arranged by Okuyama Teikichi. This song, along with "Call for Taiwan's Autonomy" is one of Tshuà Pôe-hué's well-known works.

During this period, record companies such as Nippon Columbia and Victor Records expanded Taiwan’s music market. Producers promoted songs through films and live performances, while composers and singers including Teng Yu-hsien, Lee Lim-chhiu, Sun-sun, and Su Tung became prominent figures in the industry.

Songs such as Bāng Chhun-hong and The Torment of a Flower became widely known across Taiwan.

Many musicians active during this era had received Japanese-language education and were influenced by both Japanese and Western musical styles. Some writers and composers also used music to express local Taiwanese identity.

Following the outbreak of the Second Sino-Japanese War in 1937, restrictions on non-Japanese-language music increased. Rather than throwing away existing songs, the colonial government and major Japanese music companies aggressively weaponized popular melodies for war mobilization. The most explicit evidence of this strategy lies in the rewriting of Taiwanese pop classics into Japanese military songs (Gunka). Songs that originally carried native Taiwanese identity and cultural implications got stripped of their meanings to become hollow propaganda songs to promote Japanization. Furthermore, melodies that audiences had come to associate with (urban) Taiwanese life and culture were repurposed to carry state messages. The same reproducibility that allowed a Taiwanese-language song to circulate widely also made it possible for the Japanese colonial state to redirect its meaning at scale. The music industry was further disrupted during the Pacific War by shortages, economic difficulties, and bombing campaigns. This period ended after the transfer of Taiwan to the Republic of China in 1945.

=== 1950s–1960s: Martial law and censorship ===
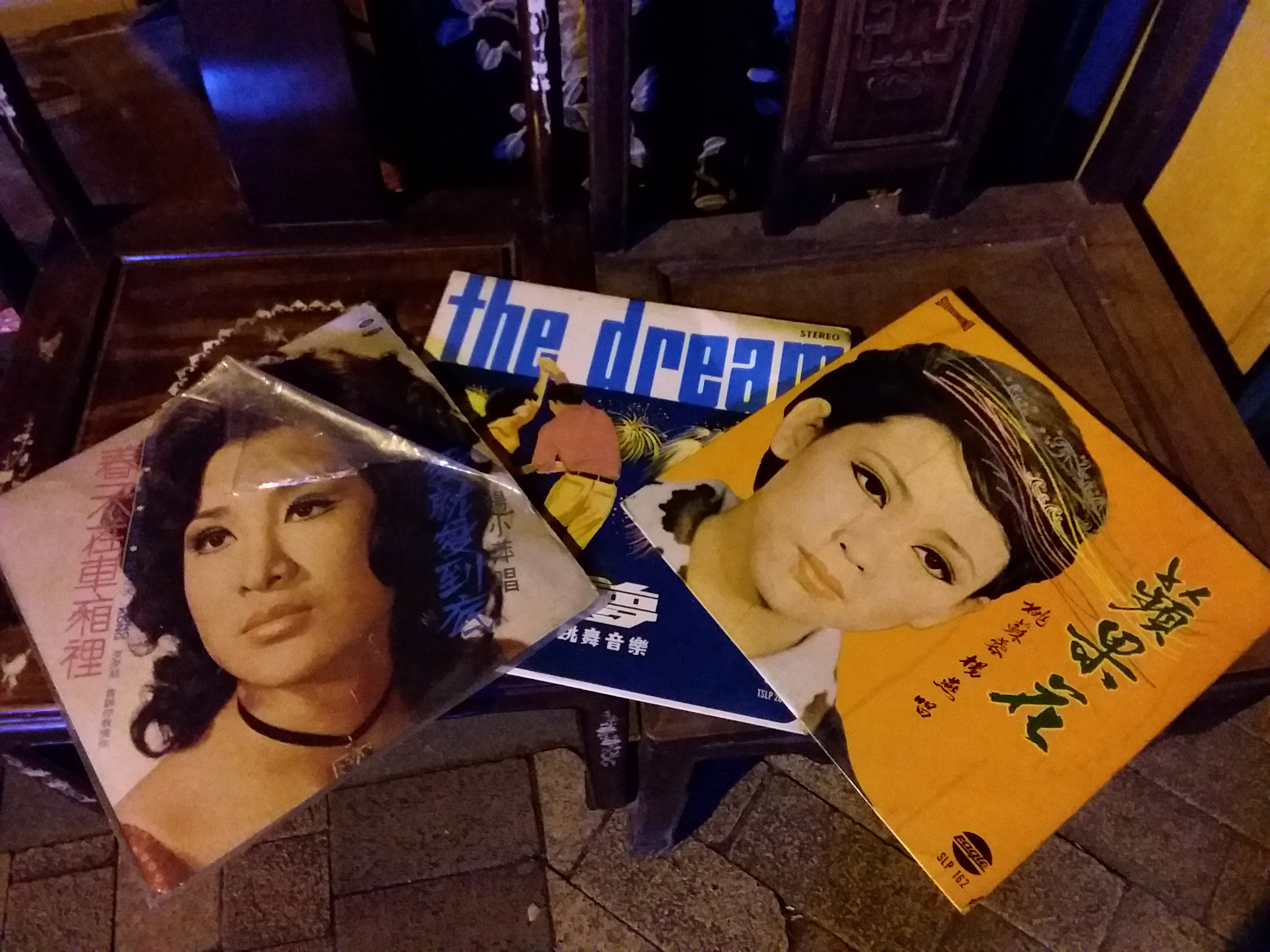
Vinyl record of Yao Su-jung in the 1960s.

After the February 28 incident and the beginning of martial law, the Kuomintang government promoted Mandarin Chinese and restricted the public use of Japanese and many local Taiwanese languages.

During this period, Mandarin-language popular music became dominant in Taiwan. Many songs were influenced by Japanese enka, reflecting the country's earlier cultural connections with Japan. Popular songs of the era included Mandarin adaptations of Japanese melodies.

Taiwanese Hokkien-language songs continued to exist but faced broadcasting restrictions. In the 1960s, television stations were reportedly limited in the number of Taiwanese-language songs they could air each day.

Singers including Tzu Wei, Yao Su-jung, and Mei Tai gained popularity in Taiwan and other Chinese-speaking communities. Songs such as Green Island Serenade became associated with the era.

Political censorship also affected the music industry. Some songs were banned because authorities considered their themes politically sensitive.

=== 1970s–1980s: Campus folk movement ===
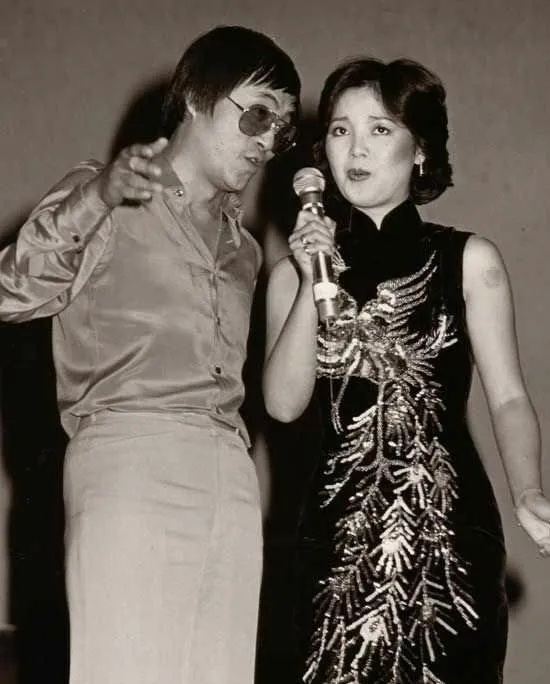
Teresa Teng performing with Liu Chia-chang at a party in Los Angeles in 1980.

During the 1970s, Taiwan saw the rise of the Campus folk song movement. The genre emerged among university students and was influenced by the American folk music revival.

Campus folk songs typically featured acoustic instruments such as guitar and piano, with lyrics focusing on youth, daily life, literature, and cultural identity. The movement reflected broader social changes in Taiwan following its withdrawal from the United Nations in 1971.

Artists associated with the movement included Lo Ta-yu, Chyi Yu, and Hou Dejian.

At the same time, singers such as Teresa Teng and Fong Fei-fei became major figures in Taiwanese popular music. Teng’s 1977 recording of The Moon Represents My Heart became one of the best-known Chinese-language songs of the period. Many of Teng's songs were influenced by the Japanese Enka style.

Many Taiwanese performers during the 1970s and 1980s recorded music in both Mandarin and Taigi.

During this period, Taiwan's first Hakkapop song was released in 1981 by Tu Minheng 涂敏恆. Following this, a number of prominent Hakka music labels began to emerge in Taiwan, including Hanxing Communications (漢興傳播), Lung Ko Culture (龍閣文化), and Jisheng Film and Television. However, despite the growth of the genre, limited experimentation in musical style meant that much of the audience remained older, and the genre's popularity continued to be concentrated mainly in Hakka-speaking communities within Taiwan.

=== 1980s: Post-martial law changes ===
Following the lifting of martial law in 1987, restrictions on Taiwanese-language media and cultural expression were eased.

The music industry diversified during the late 1980s and early 1990s. Musicians increasingly addressed social issues and incorporated a wider range of styles, including rock, hip hop, and folk influences.

In 1989, Blacklist Studio released Song of Madness, often regarded as one of the first albums to combine Taiwanese-language lyrics with contemporary rock and hip hop influences. In 1990, Lim Giong released Marching Forward, which became associated with the New Taiwanese Song movement, wherein the songs reflected the social situation of the time as well as opening new possibilities for Taiwanese language music.

At the same time, Hakka-language popular music also gained greater visibility through performers including Sheng-Chih Wu and Min-Heng Tu.

Artists such as Jody Chiang, Chris Hung, Chen Lei (singer), Stella Chang, and Fei Yu-ching remained prominent in Taiwanese-language popular music during this period.

=== 1990s: Expansion and diversification ===
In the 1990s, Taiwan became one of the largest centers of the music industry in Asia. The country was the second largest music industry in Asia, in 1998 and 1999, after Japan, before falling to fourth in 2002 due to piracy. Piracy has caused domestic repertoire as a proportion of the market to fall to 50%, in 2001, from an all-time high of around 70%, in the 1990s.

In 1993, the Taiwanese government formally allowed broader broadcasting in languages other than Mandarin, contributing to greater linguistic diversity in popular music.

Taiwanese hip hop also emerged during this period. One of the earliest commercially successful acts was L.A. Boyz, whose music mixed rap with dance-pop and Taiwanese cultural references.

Independent music scenes expanded during the 1990s, alongside the mainstream pop industry. In the mid-1990s, Taiwan became the center of one of the largest music industries in Asia. Sales of recorded music in Taiwan peaked in 1997, when sales reached US$442.3 million, but by 2008, revenue declined sharply to US$51 million, due to piracy and illegal downloads. Foreign songs began to dominate local repertoire for the first time in the mid-2000s.

=== 2000s–2010s: Expansion ===
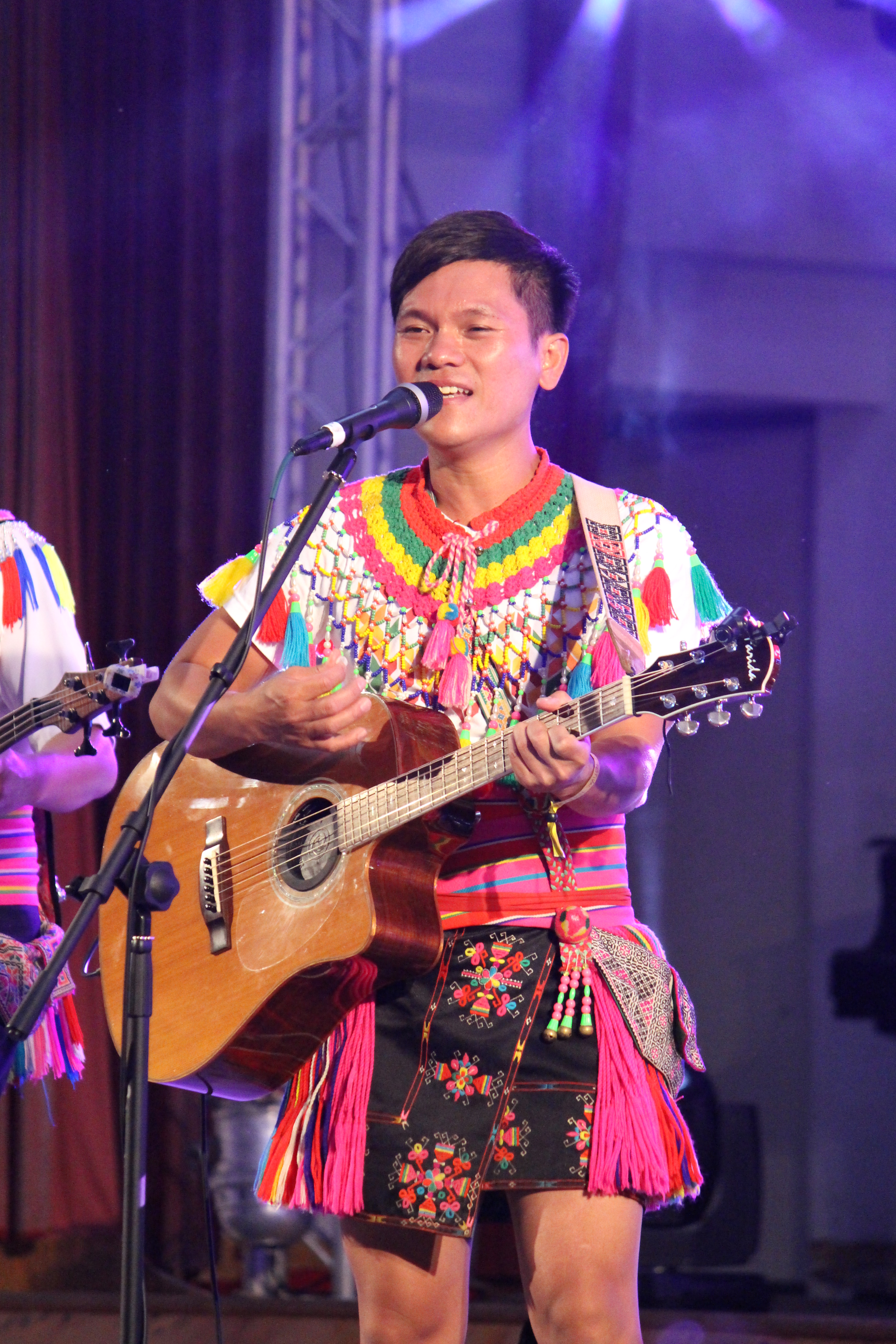
Suming Rupi at the 2016 Amis Music Festival.

During the 2000s, Taiwan continued to produce commercially successful Mandarin-language artists with audiences across East Asia and Southeast Asia.

Pop groups and singers including S.H.E, Fahrenheit, Lala Hsu, Yoga Lin, and Aska Yang emerged through television talent competitions and entertainment programs.

Taiwan's indie music scene also expanded significantly during this period. Bands such as Mayday and Sodagreen became widely known.

During the 2000s, under Chen Shui-bian's presidency, Hakkapop reflourished alongside the rise of the Hakka movement in Taiwan. The Democratic Progressive Party government expanded official support for Hakka culture through the establishment of the Hakka Affairs Council and related local government agencies. The council promoted Hakka-language pop music through concerts, competitions, and media initiatives, including the launch of a Hakka television channel. The Golden Melody Awards later introduced Hakka music categories, helping increase the visibility of the genre. As Taiwanese internet users grew, Hakka pop music were able to reach wider and younger audiences across the nation.

Starting from the 2000s, Taiwanese society began to place more emphasis on ethnic culture and local characteristics, resulting in Indigenous Taiwanese musicians gaining greater visibility in mainstream music. Artists including Suming, Abao, and Sangpuy incorporated Indigenous languages and musical traditions into pop, folk, electronic, and R&B styles.

The Taiwanese music industry experienced major financial changes during the digital era. Revenue from physical album sales declined from NT$12.33 billion (US$409 million) in 1997 to NT$1.64 billion in 2012. This led record companies to place greater emphasis on concerts, endorsements, and digital platforms.

=== 2020s ===
In the 2020s, artists including Jay Chou, Jolin Tsai, and JJ Lin remained among the most-streamed Taiwanese performers internationally.

In 2020, Abao won Album of the Year and Song of the Year at the Golden Melody Awards for her Paiwan-language album Kinakaian. It marked the first time an Indigenous-language release received the ceremony's top honors.

Streaming services and social media platforms have continued to influence how Taiwanese music is distributed and promoted domestically and internationally.

== Characteristics ==
Taiwanese pop music has incorporated influences from Chinese, Japanese, Taiwanese, Indigenous Taiwanese, and Western musical traditions throughout its development.

Early Taiwanese popular songs were strongly influenced by Japanese enka during the Japanese colonial period. From the 1960s onward, electric guitars and Western-style arrangements became increasingly common. During the campus folk era of the 1970s and 1980s, acoustic instrumentation and singer-songwriter styles became prominent.

Contemporary Taiwanese pop music includes a wide range of styles, including R&B, hip hop, electronic music, ballads, rock, and dance-pop.

Taiwanese pop is also notable for its multilingual character. Songs may be performed in Mandarin, Taiwanese Hokkien, Hakka, Indigenous languages, Japanese, or English.

== Industry ==
=== Record labels ===
Major Taiwanese record labels and music companies have included Rock Records, HIM International Music, Avex Taiwan, B'in Music, and Linfair Records.

=== International distribution ===
Taiwanese pop music is distributed internationally through digital platforms, physical releases, concerts, and overseas Chinese-speaking communities.

Taiwanese music has maintained audiences in regions including China, Hong Kong, Singapore, Malaysia, North America, and Australia.

=== Charts ===
The G-Music Chart is one of Taiwan's best-known music charts. It began publication in 2005 and tracks physical music sales in Taiwan.

=== Awards ===
Major Taiwanese music awards include:

- Golden Melody Awards
- Hito Music Awards

The Recording Industry Foundation in Taiwan previously issued gold and platinum certifications for music recordings.

=== Festivals ===
Taiwan hosts numerous music festivals featuring pop, indie, rock, jazz, and Indigenous music. These include:

Festival name	Type	City/venue	Years	Notes
Amis Music Festival	Indigenous music	Dulan Village, Taitung County	2013–present	Organized by Suming Rupi
Beigang International Music Festival	Light music	Beigang, Yunlin	2006–present	The festival has a series of concerts, mostly wind music, and an educational program within the Chia-Hu Conservatory
Fireball Fest.	Indie Music, Rock Music	Rakuten Taoyuan Baseball Stadium, Taoyuan	2017–present	The festival is initiated and produced by the band Fire EX..
Formoz Festival	Indie Music	Taipei	1995–present	Formoz Festival plays an important role in the development of Taiwanese indie music.
Hohaiyan Rock Festival	Rock Music	Fulong Beach, Gongliao District, New Taipei	2000–present	
Megaport Music Festival	Rock festival and Indie Music	Kaohsiung	2006–present	
Spring Scream	Music festival	Kenting, Pingtung County	1995–present	The festival showcases a variety of music styles from bands both from Taiwan and overseas.
Taichung Jazz Festival	Jazz festival	Taichung	2003–present	
Taroko Music Festival	Music festival	Taroko National Park, Xiulin Township, Hualien County	2002–present	

== See also ==
- Music of Taiwan
- Mandopop
- Hakka popular music
- Hokkien pop
- Campus folk song
- Taiwanese rock
- Taiwanese hip hop
- Taiwanese Indigenous pop music
