= Hokkien pop =

Taiwanese pop music

Hokkien pop / Taiwanese Hokkien pop / Taiwanese pop
- Cultural origins: 1930s Taiwan
- Typical instruments: Chinese musical instruments, western musical instruments

Regional scenes
- Music of Taiwan

Other topics
- Cantopop • J-pop • K-pop • Chinese rock

- Taiwanese pop
- Hàn-jī: 臺灣歌
- Pe̍h-ōe-jī: Tâi-oân-koa
- Tâi-lô: Tâi-uân-kua

Common name
- Hàn-jī: 臺語流行音樂
- Pe̍h-ōe-jī: Tâi-gí liû-hêng im-ga̍k
- Tâi-lô: Tâi-gí liû-hîng im-ga̍k

Hokkien pop, also known as Taiwanese Hokkien popular music, Taiwanese pop (臺灣歌; Tâi-oân-koa), T-pop (臺語流行音樂; Tâi-gí liû-hêng im-ga̍k), Tai-pop, Minnan Pop and Taiwanese folk (臺語歌; Tâi-gí-koa), is a popular music genre sung in Hokkien, especially Taiwanese Hokkien and produced mainly in Taiwan and sometimes in Fujian in Mainland China or Hong Kong or even Singapore in Southeast Asia. Hokkien pop is most popular amongst Hoklo people in Taiwan, mainland China, Hong Kong, and the Overseas Chinese and Overseas Taiwanese in Southeast Asia, such as Chinese Singaporeans, Chinese Malaysians, Chinese Filipinos, Chinese Indonesians, etc.

== Terminology ==
The historical origin of Hokkien pop comes from a Japanese enka base instead of a Chinese shidaiqu base. Because it developed from traditional Japanese enka, it has become diverse in its varieties.

== History ==
=== Origin ===
Under Japanese rule (1895–1945), Taiwanese music continued and developed its new form from the previous period. By the 1930s, vinyl records of traditional music, such as Taiwanese opera, Peking opera, Nanguan, and Beiguan were popular. Taiwanese records also reached Hokkien-speaking communities abroad. In 1930s British Malaya, gezaixi (Taiwanese opera) records released by Taiwan Columbia, were sold alongside other Japanese goods and became the main source of Hokkien records for radio programming. The first Hokkien record to have "pop song" printed on its label was March of the Black Cats. Sung by Chiu-chan and released in March 1929, the song featured Taiwanese opera-style seven-character lines with a Western orchestral instrumentation. In March 1932, a Hokkien-language promotional jingle recorded by Sun-sun to advertise the film The Peach Girl was released, and achieved wider popularity.

A new business model of the popular music industry emerged when Kashiwano Seijiro, who led the Taiwan branch of Columbia Record Company, started to market their records in new ways, such as marketing songs with silent movies. Kashiwano also recruited and made popular musical talents such as Teng Yu-hsien, Yao Tsan-fu, Su Tung, Lee Lim-chhiu and Sun-sun. They produced important titles such as Bāng Chhun-hong (Longing for the Spring Breeze) and The Torment of a Flower (Flower of a Rainy Night). The Taiwan branch of Victor Records was an equally competitive company, delegated by the influential Lin Ben Yuan Family and headed by Chang Fu-hsing. With talents such as Chen Ta-ju, Victor produced important titles such as White Peony.

This new business was led by a new generation born under Japanese rule. This generation received modern Japanese education at that time and was exposed to western musical styles and ideas. Some were active in the new music industry because of their interest in politics. Music helped them demonstrate their disapproval against the Japanese ruling and support of native culture.

However, Hokkien pop was soon set back. As Second Sino-Japanese War broke out in 1937, non-Japanese songs were banned, and talents were required to write songs (and change previous songs) for military propaganda. The situation worsened in 1941 when the Pacific War broke out. The bombings of Taiwan (called Formosa at the time) by the United States, poverty, and the shortage of raw materials hit the music industry hard, a situation which drove many talents away. This period ends with the end of World War II and the handover of Taiwan to the Republic of China in 1945.

After 1945, much of this repertoire disappeared. In 1947, the provincial administration ordered Japanese language records to be collected and destroyed, and advert vinyl replaced shellac from 1957, most surviving 78s were thrown away. Interest revived in the 1990s, when collectors such as Lin Liang-che began recovering discs from the old houses. The 2003 documentary Viva Tonal brought the recordings to a wider public.

=== 1950s–1960s: Political interference and censorship ===
Taiwan's period of White Terror began after the February 28 Incident of 1947 and declaration of martial law in 1949. The Kuomintang had lost the Chinese Civil War and proclaimed Taipei as the temporary capital of the Republic of China. All facets of Taiwanese culture that were not of Han Chinese origin were under scrutiny. In particular, the government discouraged use of Taiwanese languages (see also Taiwanese Hokkien§Politics). As a result, native Taiwanese pop music was no longer in development.

In the 1960s, Taiwan Television was barred from airing more than two Taiwanese pop songs a day.

=== 1980s: Lifting of martial law ===
By the early 1980s, Hokkien pop remained popular only among the older generations and working class; Mandopop had benefited from government promotion of Standard Chinese in gaining appeal with the younger generation. After the lifting of martial law in 1987, local Taiwanese culture was allowed to flourish, and major changes came to the content and social status of Tai-pop songs.

Blacklist Studio ventured release the first native Taiwanese album, entitled Song of Madness, in the Mandopop-dominated market of 1989.

One famous male singer from the 1980s is Chris Hung who is famous for One Little Umbrella (一支小雨傘); Hung also produces Taiwanese Christian song albums. Another famous male singer from the 1990s is Chen Lei, who made a number of famous songs such as Hoa-Hi Tioh Ho (歡喜就好).

Fong Fei-fei is a famous Taiwanese singer from the 1970s who is a Mandarin pop singer, but also has albums in Taiwanese too.

Jody Chiang is Taiwan's most famous singer and is often referred to as the Queen of Taiwanese pop music. She has many albums and compilations that date from the 1980s to the present. She can be referred to as the Taiwanese equivalent of Teresa Teng (below).

Stella Chang has produced albums entirely in Mandarin and entirely Taiwanese. She made her debut singing Taiwan's School campus songs and is a Mandarin pop singer, but branched out into contemporary Mandarin and Taiwanese songs to reflect her heritage.

Teresa Teng although of mainland Chinese heritage, is also known to have songs in Taiwanese. Unfortunately, these songs have not made it to CDs like her Japanese, Mandarin, and Cantonese songs have. Although Teng is better known for her Mandarin albums, her songs were also influenced by Japanese Enka style and by older Taiwan min-ge songs.

Fei Yu-Ching also of mainland Chinese heritage, published at the end of the 1980s two albums in Hokkien. The first album published in 1987 is called 甲人做伙 (A man as a partner) and the second one published in 1988 is called 古早 (Once Upon a Time). He also sung many Hokkien songs on famous Taiwanese television shows in the 1990s and 2000s.

Chen Ying-Git is a famous female singer of Taiwanese Hakka heritage, who has also produced albums from the 1980s through the 1990s like Jody Chiang. One of her famous songs is 海海人生. She sings a famous duet called 酒醉黑白話 with Taiwanese male singer Yu Tian, who also sings in Mandarin.

Other famous Taiwanese singers include Chang Hsiu-ching from Pingtung, who is famous for her song "Chhia-chām" (車站; Train Station) from the early 1990s.

=== 1990s: Reintegration ===
In 1990, Lim Giong launched the first successful Taiwanese album under Rock Records. It also broke away the tradition by having a new-ballad style instead of the old-enka style.

In 1993, Taiwan's government opened up the broadcasting of TV or radio programs to languages other than Mandarin.

In the mid-1990s, Taiwan became the centre of one of the largest music industries in Asia. The country was the second largest music industry in Asia, in 1998 and 1999, after Japan, before falling to fourth in 2002 due to piracy. Piracy has caused domestic repertoire as a proportion of the market to fall to 50%, in 2001, from an all-time high of around 70%, in the 1990s. Sales of recorded music in Taiwan peaked in 1997, when sales reached US$442.3 million, but by 2008, revenue declined sharply to US$51 million, with piracy and illegal downloads to blame. Foreign songs began to dominate local repertoire for the first time in the mid-2000s, as they did in Hong Kong and mainland China.

== Present ==
The most popular Taiwanese female singer to date is Jody Chiang, who has numerous Taiwanese albums dating from the early 1980s. Another famous singer in Taiwan also known for her ballads is Chen Ying-git.

Current Hokkien pop music is becoming more influenced by Mandarin pop and include a wide variety of styles including rock, hip-hop, rap etc. Artists such as Wu Bai, Phil Chang, Jolin Tsai, Eric Moo, Show Lo, Mayday and Jay Chou are known to have Taiwanese songs in their albums. Recently, the rising popularity of the Hokkien pop diva Jeannie Hsieh has put Hokkien pop to a new level with her dance songs which are very different from the traditional Hokkien pop ballad sad songs. Also, Taiwanese black metal band Chthonic has risen to international prominence due to their nationalistic, anti-Chinese themes, as well as lead singer Freddy Lim's ascension into politics.

== Certification ==
In August 1996, IFPI Taiwan (now Recording Industry Foundation in Taiwan) introduced gold and platinum awards for music recordings in Taiwan, along with the IFPI Taiwan Chart, which was suspended in September 1999.

== Artists ==
- Ada Zhuang
- A-go-go
- AKB48 Team TP
- A-mei
- Ann
- Blacklist Studio
- Chang Hsiu-ching
- Cheer Chen
- Chen Lei
- Chen Meifeng
- Chen Xiao-yun
- Chen Ya-lan
- Chen Yi-lang
- Chen Ying-git
- Chris Hung
- Christine Fan
- Chthonic (band), Freddy Lim
- Cindy Yen
- Cyndi Wang
- Eason Chan
- EggPlantEgg, Ng Ki-pin
- Elva Hsiao
- Eric Moo
- Fei Yu-Ching
- Fire EX.
- F.I.R.
- F4
- Fish Leong
- Fong Fei-fei
- Hsie He-hsian (R.Chord)
- Huang Fei
- Huang Yee-ling
- Henry Hsu
- Jacky Wu
- Jam Hsiao
- Jay Chou
- Jeannie Hsieh
- Jia Jia
- JJ Lin
- Jody Chiang
- Jolin Tsai
- Julia Peng
- Julie Sue
- Kerris Tsai
- Kuo Chin-fa
- Ma Chia-ling of AKB48
- Machi
- Mayday
- Michael Shih
- Namewee
- Nana Lee
- Nine One One (band)
- Phil Chang
- S.H.E
- Show Lo
- Sodagreen
- SpeXial
- Stefanie Sun
- Teresa Teng
- Timi Zhuo
- Tsai Chin
- Tsai Lan-chin
- Vivian Hsu
- Wang Leehom
- Weng Li-you
- Where Chou
- William Wei
- Wu Bai
- Hsiao Huang-chi
- Yeh Hsien-hsiu
- Yen-j
- Yoga Lin
- Yuming Lai

== See also ==
- Music of Taiwan
- Taiwanese hip hop
- Taiwanese Indigenous pop music

== Bibliography ==
- Wang, Ying-fen (2000). "Taiwan: From Innocence to Funny Rap". In Broughton, Simon; Ellingham, Mark (eds.). World Music. Volume 2, Latin and North America, Caribbean, India, Asia and Pacific. London: Rough Guides. pp. 235–40. ISBN 978-1-85828-636-5.
