= Lán Tâi-oân =

Taiwanese ballad

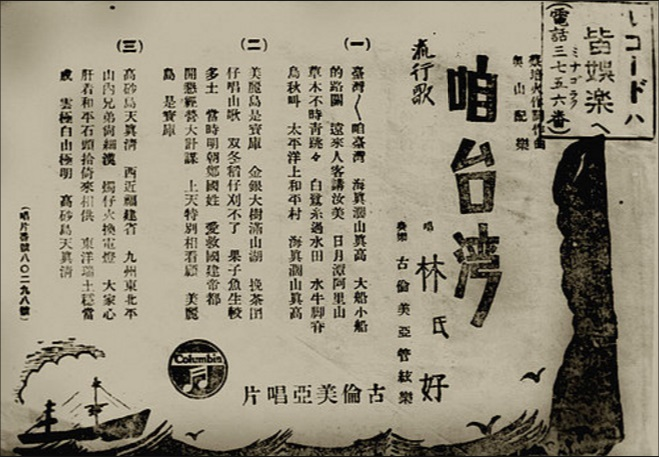
- Original lyric sheet
- Hàn-jī: 咱台灣
- Pe̍h-ōe-jī: Lán Tâi-oân
- Tâi-lô: Lán Tâi-uân

“Lán Tâi-oân” (“Our Taiwan”; Taiwanese: 咱台灣; Pe̍h-ōe-jī: Lán Tâi-oân) is a popular song from Taiwan during the Japanese rule. The lyrics and music were written by political activist Tsai Pei-huo and completed in 1929. The song was later recorded and released by Columbia Records in 1933–1934, with arrangement by Okuyama Teikichi and sung by Lin Hau. This song, along with “Call for Taiwan’s Autonomy” is one of Tsai Pei-huo's well-known works.

== Lyric description ==
In its first verse stanza, “Lán Tâi-oân” describes the scenery of Taiwan, including its mountain and sea features, Sun Moon Lake, Alishan, as well as its flora and fauna, such as the white egret by the rice paddies and the buffalo resting under the autumn sun. The first half of the second verse stanza highlights the abundance of natural resources in Taiwan, with luxuriant foliage compared to gold and silver, and the beautiful voices of young tea-pickers. The latter half of the same verse stanza pays tribute to the diligent toil of ancestors cultivating this land while also thanking heavens for the blessings bestowed upon us. The third verse stanza paints a picture of Taiwan's location, nestled between Fujian Province of China to the west and Kyushu Island of Japan to the northeast. Amid the island's natural splendor, it is the people who hold the key to peace. With indigenous tribes and diverse ethnic groups living together peacefully, the shared dream that Taiwan becomes Oriental Switzerland, a beacon of harmony and tranquility in the East, would come true.

== Arrangements ==
After the end of World War II, renowned dancer Tsai Jui-yueh returned from Japan to Taiwan, where she choreographed a modern dance piece “We Love Our Taiwan” on the ship while listening to “Lán Tâi-oân.” Later, musician Tyzen Hsiao arranged the song for the flute, oboe, clarinet, vocals, and piano while also modifying the lyrics of the second and third verse stanzas.
