= Taiwan Indigenous pop music =

Taiwan Indigenous pop music is a category of fusion popular music performed in Austronesian languages native to Taiwan that blends modern pop music with Indigenous linguistic and cultural elements.

== Development ==
Prior to the late 1990s, songs performed in Taiwanese Indigenous languages were primarily traditional folk songs categorized under the "World Music" genre. In 2000, the Bunun artist Biung released the album titled "The Hunter" which contains the song "Ana tupa tu". This is one of the first attempts to blend Indigenous languages and cultures with pop music in Taiwan. In 2003, the Golden Melody Awards introduced the "Best Indigenous Language Album" category.

Over the past two decades, as the process of cultural revitalization has advanced in the country and a sense of pride has been rekindled amongst Taiwan's indigenous communities, this genre of music has gradually gained recognition within mainstream Taiwanese society. For example, in 2020, Abao won both Album of the Year and Song of the Year at the 31st Golden Melody Awards for her Paiwan language album "Kinakaian" ("Mother Tongue") and the single "Thank You". This was the first time an Indigenous-language artist had taken these top honors in Mandopop-dominated categories. Subsequently, in 2021, Sangpuy was awarded the Album of the Year and Best Indigenous Singer for his album "Pulu'em" ("Gain Strength") at the 32nd Golden Melody Awards. In 2025, Sauljaljui's album VAIVAIK was awarded the Best Indigenous Language Album and Best Arranger awards at the 36th Golden Melody Awards.

Taiwan Indigenous pop music is also increasingly connecting with international audiences and artists across the broader Austronesian world fueled by ancestral ties and cross-cultural collaborations. For example, annual events like the Amis Music Festival and the Taiwan PASIWALI Festival in Taitung County attract musicians and audiences from Taiwan's Pacific and Southeast Asian neighbors—such as Australia, Indonesia, Malaysia, Mauritius, New Caledonia, New Zealand, the Philippines, the Solomon Islands and Tahiti—to celebrate shared cultures between Taiwan's indigenous people and the Austronesian heritage.

Taiwanese Indigenous artists like Sauljaljui has actively collaborated with musicians and artists—such as Alena Murang from Malaysia and artists from Mauritius and Madagascar, through musical projects like "Small Island Big Song". This project brings together music, film and live performance with over 100 indigenous musicians participating across eight island nations of the Pacific and Indian Oceans.

== Notable artists ==
Notable Taiwan indigenous pop music artists include:

- Abao
- A-Lin
- A-Mei
- Biung
- Ilid Kaolo
- Kasiwa
- Makav
- Matzka
- Putad Pihay
- Sauljaljui
- Sangpuy Katatepan Mavaliyw
- Suming

== See also ==
- Music of Taiwan
- Pop music in Taiwan
- Amis Music Festival
