= Lee Shuang-tse =

Lee Shuang-tse 李雙澤
- Born: July 14, 1949
- Died: September 10, 1977 (aged 28)

Lee Shuang-tse (Chinese: 李雙澤; pinyin: Lǐ Shuāng-zé, also romanized as Lee Shuang-tze, Lee Shuan-che, Lee Shuan-ze; July 14, 1949 – September 10, 1977) graduated from National Taiwan Normal University High School and Tamkang University. He was a painter, composer, and folk singer, and is respected as the catalyst of the campus folk song movement in Taiwan, together with Parangalan (胡德夫) and Yang Hsien.

== Biography ==
Lee Shuang-tse was a young composer and artist known as the "Chinese Bobby Dylan." His father was of Filipino-Chinese descent, and he came to Taiwan via Hong Kong with his mother when he was in elementary school. He enrolled in the mathematics department at Tamkang College of Arts and Sciences (now Tamkang University) in 1968 but eventually found his calling in the architecture department and even considered abandoning his math studies and switching his major to architecture. Art critic Koo Hsien-liang (顧獻樑) became head of the architecture department, which inspired Lee to develop his skills in the arts. He took almost all of the art-related courses offered by the department, and was particularly inspired by the watercolor classes taught by Shiy De-jinn. Although he was unable to switch departments due to a lack of credits in his undergraduate degree in mathematics, this experience laid the groundwork for his future work in art and literature.

In 1972, Lee began working in Taipei to make a living and frequented the Embassy of Colombia's café, where young people like him, including Parangalan, Yang Hsien, Han Cheng-hao, Wu Chu-chu, and others, would gather. About the café, Lee said, “I had never had the chance to enter such a glamorous place when I was abroad: it had mahogany carved tables and chairs, floor-to-ceiling windows with bright red carpets; elegant ladies and dapper gentlemen, jeweled and glamorous; the sizzling steaks, interlaced with the sound of forks and knives against plates, and Parangalan was behind the piano, which spun on a revolving base.”

It was a time of gradual international decline in Taiwan's international standing, since the Republic of China had just broken off diplomatic relations with Japan and withdrawn from the United Nations. Still, young people in Taiwan were mainly interested in Western music and had little interest in songs in their own language. Because of this, Lee felt the urge to "sing [his] own songs."

At the time, Parangalan was working as a singer in the restaurant to earn money to pay for his father's surgery. Lee asked him, "You're Puyuma, don't your people have their own songs? Sing one of your own songs!" Parangalan's mind went blank and he couldn't think of a song that was "his own" to sing. After a while, he remembered a song his father had sung to him as a child, "Beautiful Ears of Rice." He sang it and taught everybody to sing it with him. This experience was the inspiration for Lee to later travel to different colleges and encourage people to "sing their own songs."

In 1973, Lee and Parangalan arranged a folk song concert at the International House of Tamkang College of Arts and Sciences, and the following year, Lee held his first solo exhibition at the United States Information Agency in Taiwan. He also worked in the publication department of Tamkang College as an editor for the campus magazine, The World of Tomorrow. In 1975, Lee dropped out of the math department and traveled abroad to study painting. During his travels to Spain, the UK, France, Germany, and the United States, Lee witnessed social inequality and racial discrimination, which he likened to "the dark shadows of a bright world." As a result of his travels, he began to write extensively about his observations and views.

== Tamkang incident ==
On December 3, 1976, Tamkang College of Arts and Sciences held a "Western Folk Music Concert" on campus, hosted by Tao Hsiao-ching. After the first singer, Huang Hua-chin (黃華勤) finished performing, Lee went on stage with a bottle of Coca-Cola in his hand and a guitar on his back. He sang four Taiwanese folk songs, Póo Phuà-bāng (補破網), Hîng-tshun Tsi-ko (恆春之歌), "The Torment of a Flower" (雨夜花), and Bāng Chhun-hong (望春風). After the first verse of the fifth song, "Ode to Sun Yat-sen" (國父紀念歌), he stopped and asked why the audience wasn't singing along. Then, he sang Bob Dylan’s song "Blowin' in the Wind" and left the stage, asking "Why did you spend twenty dollars to come hear Chinese people sing Western songs?"

Tao Hsiao-ching (陶曉清) attempted to calm the setting by saying, "Thank you, Mr. Lee, for giving us the first highlight of the concert so far. He also raised a very serious question that's important for us to consider, but this is not the appropriate time or place for such a discussion. When we leave here tonight, it wouldn't hurt to think hard about this question, write down your thoughts, and discuss them in the school newspaper. We came here tonight to hear a concert, though, so let's keep the mood light and continue with the performance." This ignited a debate over "modern Chinese folk songs," which was published in the next article of Tamkang Weekly. This event came to be known as the "Tamkang Incident."

== Death and posthumous legacy ==
On September 10, 1977, Lee Shuang-tse drowned at the age of 28 while saving a foreign tourist from drowning at Xinghuadian Beach in Danshui Township, Taipei County (now Danshui District, New Taipei City).

After the Tamkang Incident and before his death, Lee composed prolifically in his own language to realize his goal of singing "[his] own songs." This led to the explosion of folk songs on campuses throughout Taiwan in the 1970s and 1980s.

In 1994, Paiwan poet Maljaljaves Mulaneng recalled that when he saw Lee's swollen corpse in the morgue, he remembered the days when "I used to watch him paint, he would sing his folk songs, and I would Paiwan folk songs." “I was overcome with grief and I started to loudly sing an aboriginal mourning song for deceased spirits to his body. The administrator froze in shock when did this, but stopped me when I was about to sing a second song."

== Works ==
Lee Shuang-tse completed a total of nine pieces with his contemporaries, listed below:

Song name	Lyricist or Arranger	Composer	Notes
I Know (我知道)	Liang Ching-feng (梁景峰)	Lee Shuang-tse	
Old Drummer (老鼓手)	Liang Ching-feng	Lee Shuang-tse	
Our Morning (我們的早晨)	Liang Ching-feng	Lee Shuang-tse, Hsu Li-chung (徐力中)	
The Beautiful Island (美麗島)	Liang Ching-feng	Lee Shuang-tse	Original lyrics: Chen Hsiu-si (陳秀喜)
Young China (少年中國)	Lee Shuang-tse	Lee Shuang-tse	Original lyrics: Chiang Hsun (蔣勳)
Farewell Song (送別歌)	Lee Shuang-tse	Lee Shuang-tse	
Fort Santo Domingo (紅毛城)	Lee Shuang-tse	Hsu Li-chung (徐力中)	Original lyrics: Lee Li-kuo (李利國)
The Old Man Moves Mountains (愚公移山)	Yang Kui (楊逵)	Lee Shuang-tse	
Music of the Heart (心曲)	Hsu Hsu (徐訏)	Lee Shuang-tse	Original poems published in The Lantern Collection (燈籠集)

Lee Shuang-tse never released the song "The Beautiful Island" before his death, and it was only first performed at his memorial ceremony. The night before, Yang Tsu-chun (楊祖珺) and Parangalan stayed up all night organizing his handwritten notes and recording the song. "The Beautiful Island" and "Young China" had both been submitted to the Government Information Office for approval but had been denied; "The Beautiful Island" was denied on the grounds that it was sung by members of the tangwai movement, and was declared to have pro-Taiwan independence ideology; "Young China" was declared to be a pro-communist song because it was sung by those who favored unification with the CCP. For two of his songs to be used by both pro-unification and pro-independence activists was ironic for Lee, who had no specific political stance of his own.

In 1978, Lee's novella Post-war Compensation (終戰的賠償) won the Wu Zhuoliu Literature Prize. His collection of writings, Zaijian, Shangguo (再見，上國) was published by Chang Qiao Publishing. In 1979, tangwai activists wanted to establish their own political party and chose the name "The Beautiful Island" as the name of their official publication. On September 8, 1979, a gala for The Beautiful Island was interrupted by people from Ji Feng Magazine (疾風雜誌) and others who described themselves as "patriots". Amidst the pushing and shoving, Yang Tsu-chun started singing Lee Shuang-tse's apolitical, nonviolent song "The Beautiful Island". On December 10, 1979, the government began a crackdown on those present, an event which would later be known as the "Kaohsiung Incident" or the "Meilidao Incident."

In 1987, The Beautiful Island and Young China, a collection of writings on the tenth anniversary of Lee Shuang-tse's death was published. On October 1, 2007, Tamkang University dedicated a memorial plaque to Lee Shuang-tse, donated by his friend Chiang Hsun, on the campus's Shepherd's Meadow. On October 4, 2007, Tamkang University organized "Sing Our Songs," a Lee Shuang-tse memorial concert, sponsored by Wild Fire Music, hosted by Tao Hsiao-ching, the host of the original concert. Parangalan and Yang Tsu-chun collaborated once more to sing "The Beautiful Island" in Lee's memory.

On June 27, 2009, the Lee Shuang-tse memorial album, "Salute! Sing Our Own Songs" produced by Thirty-seven Degrees Productions won the 20th Golden Melody Award in the pop music category.
