= Wu Chu-chu =

Taiwanese folk singer

Wu Chu-chu 吳楚楚
- Born: March 1, 1947 (age 79); Republic of China
- Genre: Folk
- Occupations: Singer, songwriter, lyricist
- Labels: UFO Group Skyhigh Entertainment Co., Ltd.

Wu Chu-chu (Chinese: 吳楚楚; pinyin: Wú Chǔchǔ; born March 1, 1947) is a Taiwanese musician. He is known as one of the “First Generation Folk Singers” together with Parangalan (胡德夫) Yang Tsu-chun (楊祖珺), Yang Hsien and others. After fading from fame, he established the UFO Group and entered the pop music business, fighting hard against music piracy.

== Life ==
=== First-generation folk singer ===
Wu Chu-chu was born on March 1, 1947, in Hankou, Republic of China, (now Wuhan, PRC). When he was two years old, he accompanied his father, an ROC Army Intelligence officer, to Taiwan, and later took up residence in Xindian Township, Taipei County (Now Xindian District, New Taipei City). In high school, Wu began to learn the guitar, and later tested into National Chung Hsing University of Law and Business's (now National Taipei University) Department of Land Economics. In his second year of college, he was elected guitar club president. After serving his mandatory military service, he began working as a guitar teacher, and singing in a restaurant.

In 1947, Wu Chu-chu met other singers who were working at the Colombia Café on Zhongshan North Road in Taipei, including Parangalan, Yang Hsien, Lee Shuang-tse, and Han Zheng-hao. These people, who would later go on to become the leaders of Taiwan's folk music movement, were at this point simply singers with a background in Western folk music. In the 1970s, the Republic of China was removed from the United Nations, and later severed ties with the United States. In this era, an atmosphere of confusion was all around, and young people didn't know where they fit in. Western and Japanese culture were popular at the time, including in the field of music; while Taiwanese youth lacked an awareness and appreciation for their own culture. In 1977, after Yang Xuan and Li Shuangze led the call to "sing your own songs," a sense of affection towards one's homeland began to permeate songwriting, gradually spreading. Wu Chu-chu's song "Come Back," set to the poem of the same name by Yang Mu (楊牧), deeply moved the artistic director of Cloud Gate Dance Company, Lin Hwai-min (林懷民). Lin decided to organize a concert for Wu, to be held at the Shih Chien Hall in Taipei. The concert saw Wu, 30 years old at the time, perform his original piece, "Your Song," which would become one of his most well-known works.

Also in 1977, Tao Xiaoqing (陶曉清) invited Parangalan, Yang Xuan, Wu Chu-chu, and other singers to create three albums called, "Our Songs," with the support of the Hong Foundation (洪建全教育文化基金會). One of Wu Chu-chu's pieces recorded for the album, "Ready Song" (好了歌) was considered "grey" and "gloomy", and did not pass the Government Information Office’s censorship screening. However, "Ready Song" won first place in China Broadcasting Corporation's "Song of the Year" for that year, and Wu Chu-chu also won first place in male singers. In 1981, the newly-established Rock Records & Tapes (滾石唱片) released its first album, which was a collaboration between Wu Chu-chu, Michelle Pan, and Lily Lee called "Trio" (三人展). After this album, Wu Chu-chu began to reduce his on-stage appearances, and moved on to backstage production and music administration.
