= Sun sun =

Sun Sun may refer to:

- Tia Harribel, a character in the Bleach series
- Sun Sun (Casiopea album), a 1986 album
- Sun-sun (singer) (1914–1943), a Taiwanese singer in the 1930s and 1940s
