= Moon Night Sorrow =

1933 song by Lin Hau

- 月夜愁
- Hàn-jī: 月夜愁
- Pe̍h-ōe-jī: Goa̍t-iā Chhiû
- Tâi-lô: Gua̍t-iā Tshiû
- Bbánpìng: Gguátyiâ Ciú

Moon Night Sorrow (Chinese: 月夜愁; Pe̍h-ōe-jī: Goa̍t-iā Chhiû; also known in English as Moon Night Blues, Moonlight Sorrow, and Moonlight Melancholy) is a popular Taiwanese Hokkien song, which takes its tune from the music of the Plains indigenous peoples of Taiwan. It was composed during the period of Japanese rule in Taiwan by Teng Yu-hsien, with lyrics by Chiu Thiam-ōng. It was first performed in public by Lin Hau, and recorded by Columbia Records on a record, which was released in 1933.

== History ==
Moon Night Sorrow takes its melody from a song of the Plains indigenous people of Taiwan, originally recorded by George Leslie Mackay at the beginning of the 20th century as a hymn called Naomi (拿阿美). In 1933, compuser Teng Yu-hsien rearranged it and asked Chiu Thiam-ōng to write lyrics for it. It was then performed and recorded by Lin Hau.

In 1904, the Taipei City Wall was fully demolished, and in 1909, the 40-meter-wide Taipei Ring Road was completed, built in place of the old city walls and on its foundations. It was also known as the three line road, because it was modeled after urban roads in European city planning, with a middle barrier set up with green space in the center of the road, this splitting the space into “three lines”.

In the 1930s, as open displays of courtship became common in Taiwan, couples would meet and stroll along the Taipei Ring Road. At the time, the Eastern section (now Zhongshan South Road) was the only section with street lights, leading couples to flock there to enjoy the lights. Chiu Thiam-ōng was inspired by these scenes to write lyrics about heartbreak, and set them to a sad melody. Thus, the song was born, and it was considerably popular at the time.

During the period of Japanization, Lee Yuan-pei (栗原白) was asked by the government to adapt the lyrics into a Japanese-language patriotic song. The result was “Benpu no Tsuma” (軍夫の妻), the lyrics of which encourage Taiwanese people to enlist in the Japanese Imperial Army and serve their country.

In the 1970s, the song was adapted into Mandarin by Zhuang Nu as “Farewell My Lover” (情人再見), which was made famous by Teresa Teng. It has also been performed by Fong Fei-fei. and Sarah Chen.

A version of the song arranged by Taiwanese composer Chang Wei-fan (張衞帆) was also featured in the computer game “Detention”.
