= Chen Junyu =

The name Chen Junyu may refer to:

- Chen Chun-yu (陳俊宇; born 1975), Taiwanese politician
- Tan Kun-giok (陳君玉; 1905–1963), Taiwanese songwriter
