= 純純 =

純純 and 纯纯, or ジュン ジュン in kana, may refer to:

- Junjun (singer) (born Li Chun, 1988), member of Japanese girl group Morning Musume
- Sun-sun (Taiwanese singer) (1914–1943), Taiwanese singer active in the 1930s
