= 美麗島 =

美麗島 (pinyin: měilìdaǒ), meaning "beautiful island", is another name for Formosa, also known as the island of Taiwan. It may also refer to:

- "The Beautiful Island", a Taiwanese folk song
- Formosa Boulevard metro station in Kaohsiung
- Formosa Magazine, a pro-democracy magazine published in Taiwan in 1979
