= Chang Hsiu-ching =

Chang Hsiu-ching 張秀卿
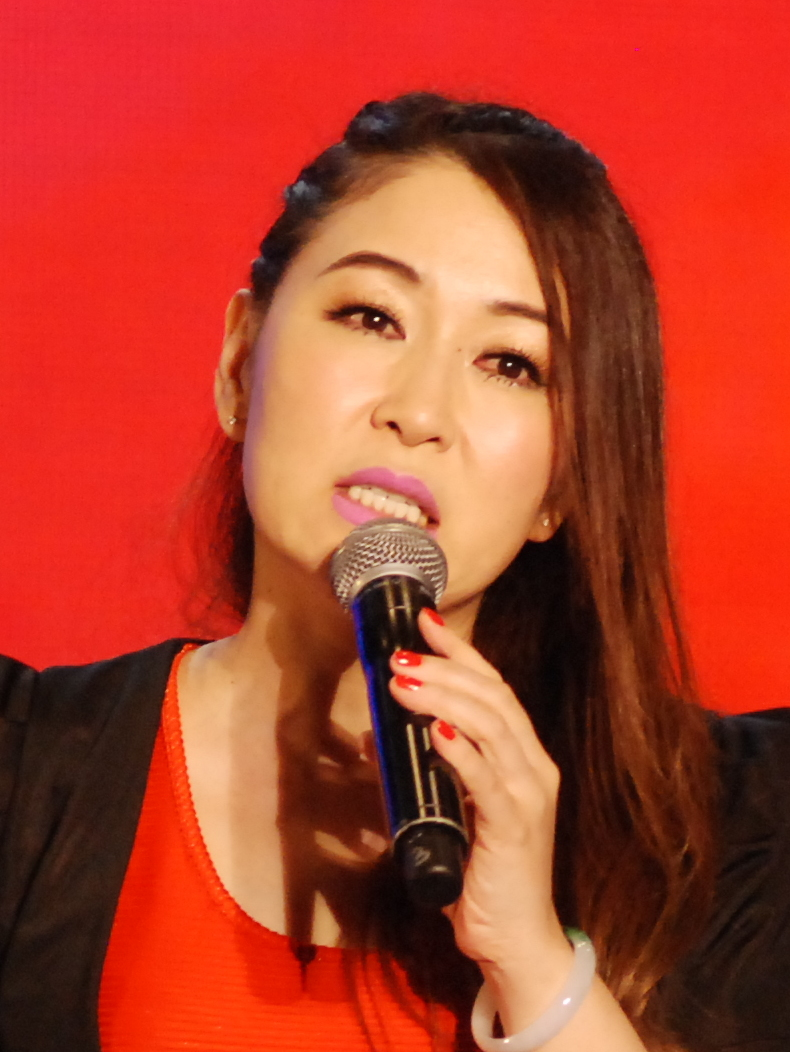
- Born: 28 May 1970 (age 55); Hengchun, Pingtung County, Taiwan
- Occupations: Singer, songwriter
- Awards: Golden Melody Awards – Best Dialect Female Artist; 1994
- Musical career
- Origin: Taiwan
- Genres: Hokkien pop

Chang Hsiu-ching (Chinese: 張秀卿; pinyin: Zhāng Xiùqīng; Pe̍h-ōe-jī: Tiuⁿ Siù-kheng; Tâi-lô: Tiunn Siù-khing born 28 May 1970) is a Taiwanese Hokkien pop singer known for her love songs. She won the 1994 Golden Melody Award for Best Dialect Female Artist.
