= Chong Sau Lin =

Malaysian musical performer

Chong Sau Lin (simplified Chinese: 张少林; traditional Chinese: 張少林; pinyin: Zhāng Shàolín, born 1946) is a Malaysian singer known for his extensive career singing mainly Hakka language songs, gaining the monikers "King of Hakka Songs" (客家歌王) and "God of Hakka Songs" (客家歌神).

== Life ==
Chong Sau Lin was born in Sungai Pelek, Selangor, Malaysia to a Malaysian Chinese Hakka family with roots in Huizhou, Guangdong. His father ran a Traditional Chinese medicine shop, but it went under and he had to work as a mason and a house painter at the age of 15 to support his family. he began getting involved in music when he was 18, and in 1968 he joined and eventually led a band named "The Red Stars" (紅星樂隊), which was later disbanded. In 1978, he wrote "Granny Buys Salted Vegetables" (Chinese: 阿婆买咸菜, A Poh Mai Ham Choy), a Hakka version of Sam Hui's "Genius and Idiot" (天才与白痴, from the film The Last Message) with new lyrics about buying Malaysian fruits and vegetables at a market, for singer Chew Chin Yuin (邱清雲), and went on to sing his own version as well. This song became his breakout hit, with a grateful Chew getting him a position at Life Records and has been cited as a major boost for Hakka pop in Malaysia. Throughout the 1980s and 1990s, Chong continued staying popular with Hakka songs about Malaysian topics.

Chong has acted in the Namewee-directed films Nasi Lemak 2.0, Nasi Lemak 1.0 and Kara King. He later collaborated with Namewee to create a Hakka version of his song "Stranger in the North".

Chong held a farewell concert in June 2024, but later clarified that he would continue making music and was merely stopping his performances on stage in the Genting Highlands.
