= Michael Shih =

Michael Shih 施文彬
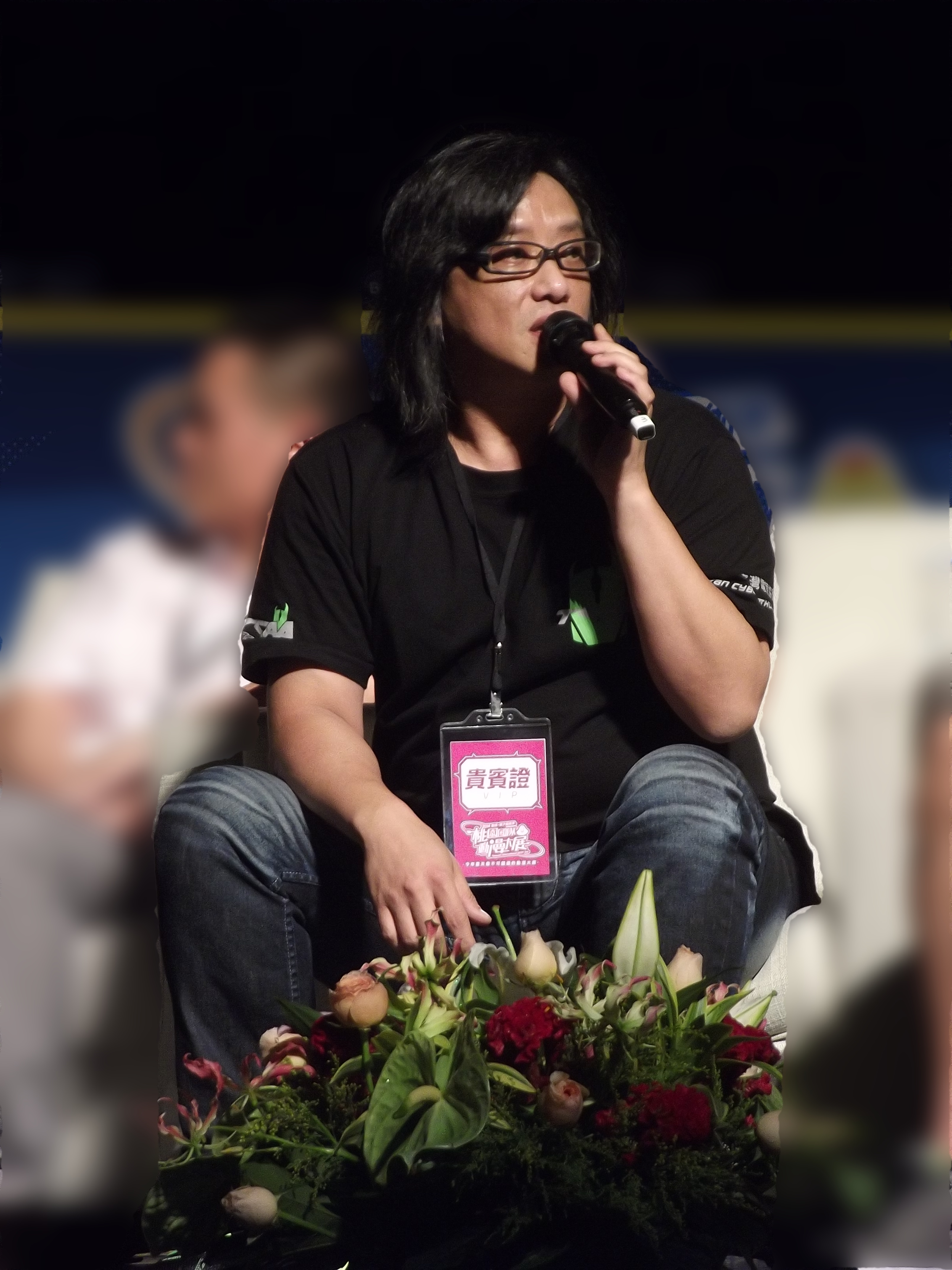
- Shih in 2014
- Born: Shih Wen-bin; 10 December 1964 (age 61); Taipei, Taiwan
- Occupations: Singer, songwriter, actor
- Awards: Golden Melody Awards – Best Taiwanese Male Singer; 2007
- Musical career
- Origin: Taiwan
- Genres: Hokkien pop
- Instruments: Vocals, guitar, keyboards
- Labels: EMI; Alfa Records; Water Tower; Warner Music; Gold Typhoon

Michael Shih (Chinese: 施文彬; pinyin: Shī Wénbīn; Pe̍h-ōe-jī: Si Bûn-pin; born 10 December 1964) is a Taiwanese Hokkien pop singer who won the 2007 Golden Melody Award for best Taiwanese male singer.

He is a fan of the Warcraft video games.
