= Sun-sun (singer) =

Taiwanese singer

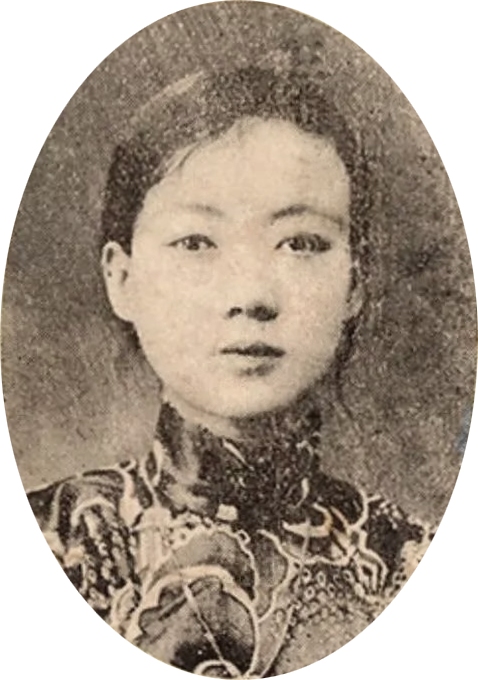
- Born: Lâu Chheng-hiong; 1914; Taiwan under Japanese rule
- Died: 8 January 1943 (aged 28–29)
- Occupation: Singer

Chinese name
- Traditional Chinese: 純純
Transcriptions
- Musical career
- Origin: Taihoku
- Genres: Taiwanese pop
- Instrument: Vocals
- Years active: 1927–1940
- Labels: Columbia; Nitto

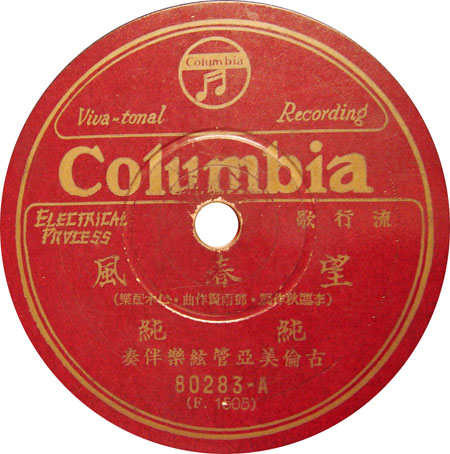
An original disc of Bang Chhun Hong labeled with "Sun-sun" (純純).

Sun-sun (Chinese: 純純; Pe̍h-ōe-jī: Sûn-sûn; kana: ジュン ジュン; romaji: junjun; 1914 – January 8, 1943), born Lâu Chheng-hiong (劉清香), was a Taiwanese pop singer.

== Biography ==
Lâu was born in 1914, in Japanese Taiwan. Inspired by Taiwanese opera performers near her parents' noodle stall in Taihoku, she quit school and joined a troupe at the age of 13. Her troupe began recording with Columbia Records in 1929, before Columbia decided to sign Lâu as a solo artist in 1931, under her given name. She adopted the stage name Sun-sun the following year.

Active throughout the 1930s and into 1940, she sang many Taiwanese or Japanese popular songs which had just been published at her time, such as "Bang Chhun Hong," "The Torment of a Flower," "Moon Night Sorrow", and "Tho Hoe Khi Hiat Ki" (桃花泣血記), a song used for advertising in Taiwan a Shanghai film of the same name, whose English title was The Peach Girl. Sun-sun also recorded advertising and theme songs for the films Repentance and A Wise Mother. She moved to Nitto Records in the late 1930s to continue working with Teng Yu-hsien and Yao Tsan-fu, whom she had met at Columbia. During this period, she released songs such as "Song of Four Seasons" and the patriotic war songs "Sending You Off" (送君曲) and "Comfort Bag" (慰問袋) for the Second Sino-Japanese War effort. As the war continued, Japanese authorities began heavily censoring the Taiwanese entertainment industry, bringing Sun-sun's career to a sudden end.

In 1935, Sun-sun opened a cafe behind Taihoku Main Station. She planned to marry a frequent customer who was a student at Taihoku Imperial University, but his family disapproved of her entertainment career. She instead married another regular at her cafe, a Japanese man surnamed Shiraishi. He contracted tuberculosis, and died in 1937. Sun-sun fell ill with the same disease while caring for him, and she died at the age of 28 in 1943.

== In popular culture ==
Her biography has been dramatized, as a main character, in the 2003 film Viva Tonal - The Dance Age (跳舞時代), and a musical named April Rain (四月望雨).

== See also ==
- Cinema of Taiwan
