= Chen Ying-git =

Taiwanese singer (1953–2026)

- 陳盈潔
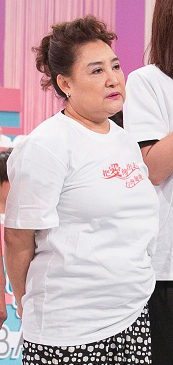
- Chen in 2014
- Born: Chen Jin-zhu; October 15, 1953; Guanxi, Hsinchu, Taiwan
- Died: August 12, 2026 (aged 72)
- Citizenship: Taiwan
- Years active: 1980-2026

Chinese name
- Traditional Chinese: 陳盈潔
Transcriptions
Standard Mandarin
- Hanyu Pinyin: Chén Yíngjié

Chen Ying-git (Chinese: 陳盈潔; October 15, 1953 – August 12, 2026) was a singer of Taiwanese Hakka heritage. She produced albums from the 1980s through the 1990s like another singer, Jody Chiang. One of her famous songs was 海海人生. She also sang a famous duet called 酒醉黑白話 with Taiwanese male singer Yu Tian.

Chen died on August 12, 2026, at the age of 72.
