= Columbia Records (Taiwan) =

Taiwanese record label

臺灣コロムビア販賣會社 Columbia Records
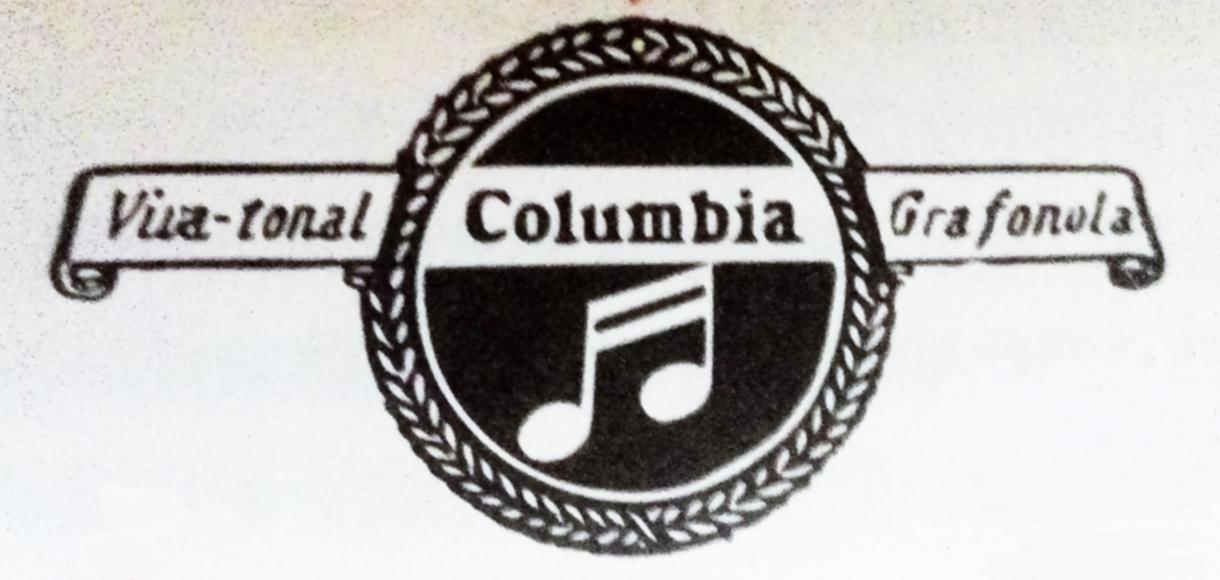
- Predecessor: Nipponophone Co., Ltd.
- Founded: February 1933; Hon-machi, Taipei City, Nichiji-Taiwan
- Founder: Shojiro Bruno (栢野正次郎)
- Defunct: circa 1945
- Headquarters: Hon-machi, Taipei City, Taiwan
- Products: record
- Services: Sales agent for phonographs
- Owner: Nipponophone Co., Ltd.

Columbia Records (Japanese: 臺灣コロムビア販賣株式會社, 1933–1945) was a record company that was once active in the manufacture and distribution of vinyl records in Taiwan under Japanese rule, and was a pioneer of Taiwan's modern pop music industry.

== Overview of the evolution ==
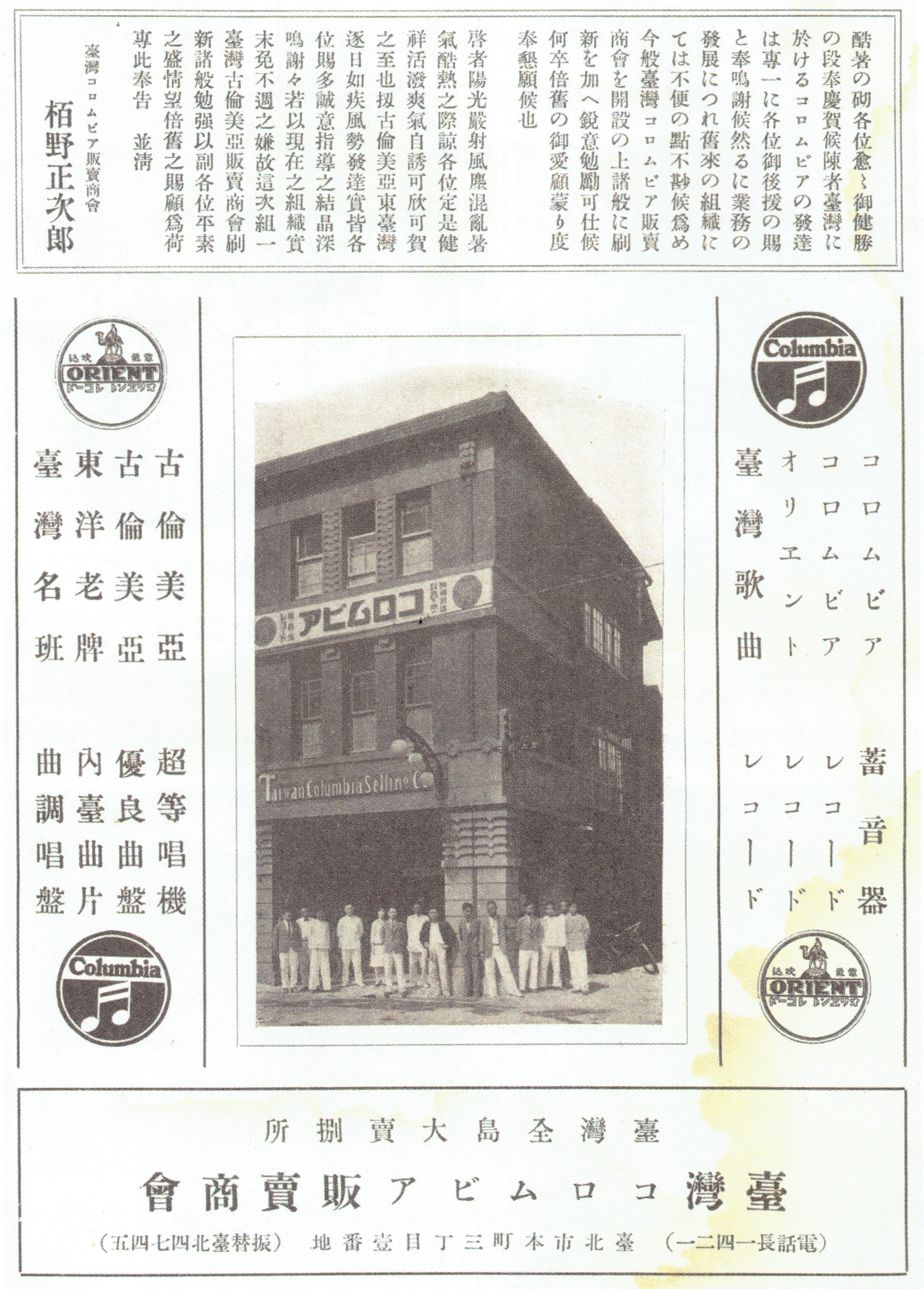
In November 1910 (or September 1911), Nippon Gumiho Shokai (株式会社日本蓄音器商会) set up its Taiwan branch office in Vinh-cho, Taipei; its initial business was the distribution of gramophones and records.

In October 1910, Nitchiku was upgraded to a joint-stock company (Kabushiki-Gaisha Nippon Chikuonki Shōkai or Nipponophone Co., Ltd.) and became Japan's first major record corporation

By spring 1912, Nitchiku had founded over thirty branch offices across Japan proper and its colonies. The one in Taipei opened in September 1911 and became Taiwan’s primary source of gramophones and related products

In 1914, Kotaro Okamoto led 15 Hakka musicians, including Lin Shi Sheng (Mandarin: 林石生), Fan Lian Sheng (Mandarin: 范連生), He Awen (Mandarin: 何阿文), He Mingtian (Mandarin: 何明添), Huang Fangrong (Mandarin: 黃芳榮), Wu Shian (Mandarin: 巫石安), and Peng Azeng (Mandarin: 彭阿增), to Japan to make recordings, and released albums such as "A String of New Years" (Mandarin: 一串年, featuring Hakka eight-tone performances), "Lighting Lanterns" (Mandarin: 點燈紅, featuring the Taiwanese Min-nan language pronunciation of the "Car Drum Tune" (Mandarin: 車鼓調), and "Sanbo Yingtai" (Mandarin: 三伯英台, which is a prototype of the development of the Gezai Opera in the floor sweeping stage).

In 1929, Nissei acquired the right to use the Columbia Records trademark and began to release records under the trademark. Shojiro Arbuthnot took charge of all his record business other than Modified Eagle Label.

On August 17, 1930, the name "Gulenmeyer" was first published in the Nippon News.

Between 1930 and 31, "Singing Chai Opera: The Story of the Martyrs" (Mandarin: 歌仔戲：烈女記) was published, featuring Wen Hongtu (Mandarin: 溫紅塗), Yue Zhong'e (Mandarin: 月中娥), and Jing Li Hua (Mandarin: 鏡梨花), with folk tales adapted into sing-song opera repertoire, with the recording number F532, and the production number "80023". The performer, Wen Hongtu, was one of the first generation of singers and had been recording singers since 1926. In the 1930s, Columbia produced a complete set of singers' songs called "New Singers' Songs", and Wen Hongtu was also responsible for the script, backstage and singing for Gulenmaier. In 1932, Columbia Records released the promotional song "A Sad Love Story"(Mandarin: 桃花泣血記), which was originally marketed for the movie "A Sad Love Story". Later, the Literary Department of Columbia Records was officially established, hiring lyricists and composers to write songs, and enlisting singers and musicians to record songs with a "Taiwanese flavor". In 1933, Tan Kun-giok (Mandarin: 陳君玉) was appointed as the Minister of Literature and Arts of Columbia; in February, Payno Shojiro registered the establishment of Taiwan Colombea Trading Company with a capital of 150,000 yen, which was a branch of Nissei in Taiwan; and released the song "Dancing Age" (Mandarin: 跳舞時代), with lyrics describing the trend of social dancing, free love, and listening to pop songs. In addition, he also released the songs "Bāng Tshun-hong" (Mandarin: 望春風) and "Moonlight Blue" (Mandarin: 月夜愁).

In 1934, Chen Junyu left his post in the middle of the year, and Chiu Thiam-ōng took over as the Minister of Literature and Arts; he published "The Torment of a Flower", "Brokenhearted Flower" (Mandarin: 碎心花), and "Four Seasons of Red"(Mandarin: 四季紅).

In 1943, the company issued its last new record, "Music of Taiwan", a set of remastered discs featuring a selection of classic tunes from the period after the arrival of the Japanese accumulators in Taiwan, from north-south pipe music to one-track recordings of opera, Peking Opera, popular songs, and music of the aborigines, for a total of eight discs; among the popular songs, the winner was "The Torment of a Flower" sung by Sun-sun.

At the end of World War II, Taipei City was bombed by the U.S. Army and the company's building was damaged. After the war, the head of the company, Shojiro Bakuno, left Taiwan.

The company closed its business with a total release of approximately 1,500 records.

== Trade Practices ==
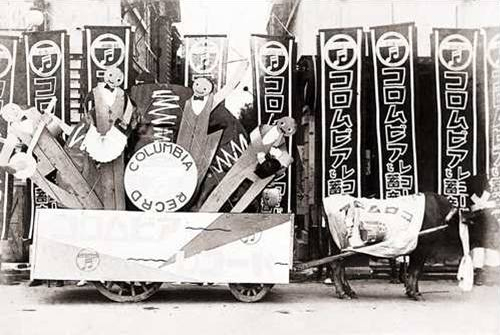
Columbia Publicity Campaign.

=== Publicity ===
Use publicity vans with flags to lead bands and staff to distribute literature along the streets and sing loudly the songs they want to publicize. Setting up flags, signs, and sun shelters with logos on them in recreational areas such as seaside baths. Alternatively, at the end of the year, a large flag with the words "斷然コロムビア" written in the center is hung from the top of the company's building façade.

=== Consumption ===
In the 1930s, Columbia's head office was located in Honmachi, Taipei, and its arts and crafts department was located in Peking Town, Taipei, where it was a Toten store across from the Guild Hall (today's Zhongshan Hall), and it also had locations in other metropolitan areas in Taiwan. By the 1940s, the company had about 50 to 60 regular employees, and many other salesmen from all over the world. National Museum of Taiwan History has a permanent exhibit of Columbia Records badges, which are internal identification badges issued by the Columbia Record Company to its employees. According to employees at the time, those who wore this badge were certified to be employees of the company, and many theaters cooperated with the record company in those years, so those who wore the badge could go to the movies without having to buy a ticket for free, which was a badge of honor and a benefit to the large and small employees of the company at the time.

== Types of Records Released ==
Before the development of Taiwan Columbia, Nipponophone recorded early Taiwanese and Hakka repertoire, including instrumental music, Hakka bayin (eight-tone), tea-picking opera, and Taiwanese opera. These recordings formed part of the earlier recording history from which Columbia's later Taiwan catalogue developed. Columbia's Taiwan repertoire included Pop Songs, Taiwanese opera, Jokes, Japanese-Taiwanese conversation disks, Cantonese Music, Bei Guan Music, and Nan Guan Music. Its releases reflected both existing Taiwanese performance traditions and new genres developed specifically for commercial recording.

Through the use of 78-rpm records, which were mainly used around the 1920s and 1930s, a new genre of music developed gradually to accommodate the structure of the recordings as well as the atmosphere of the industry. Existing Taiwanese melodies were first combined with Western or jazz-style accompaniments. New Taiwanese lyrics were then written for Hokkien, Japanese, Chinese, and other popular melodies. Eventually, composers created new melodies and lyrics specifically for recording. This emergence and restructuring of music exists in the context of Japanese recording companies attempting to enter Taiwan's market. Further, the technical limits of the 78-rpm record influenced musical structure by limiting the duration of songs to fit one side of a disc. By the mid 1930s, Columbia's popular songs commonly featured Taiwanese-language lyrics, major pentatonic melodies, modern themes, and dance rhythms performed by jazz orchestras.

Important examples include "The Peach Blossom Weeps Tears of Love" (桃花泣血記) released in 1932 as a promotional song for a Shanghai film, and "Longing for the Spring Breeze" (望春風), "Sorrow in the Moonlight" (月夜愁), and "Flower in the Rainy Night" (雨夜花), which were composed by Deng Yuxian and sung by Sun-sun. The latter songs represent the mature style of Taiwanese popular song that Columbia helped establish during the 1930s.

== Taiwan Record Label under Columbia Records ==
(Note: Years in parentheses indicate the start of release)

- NIPPONPHONE (Nipponphone, 1911)
  - ORIENT RECORD (Camel, 1926)
- Columbia (Columbia, 1929）
  - Regal (Bonus, 1934)
  - Regal (Healy's, 1933)
- EAGLE (Eagle, 1931)
  - HIKOKI (Airplane)
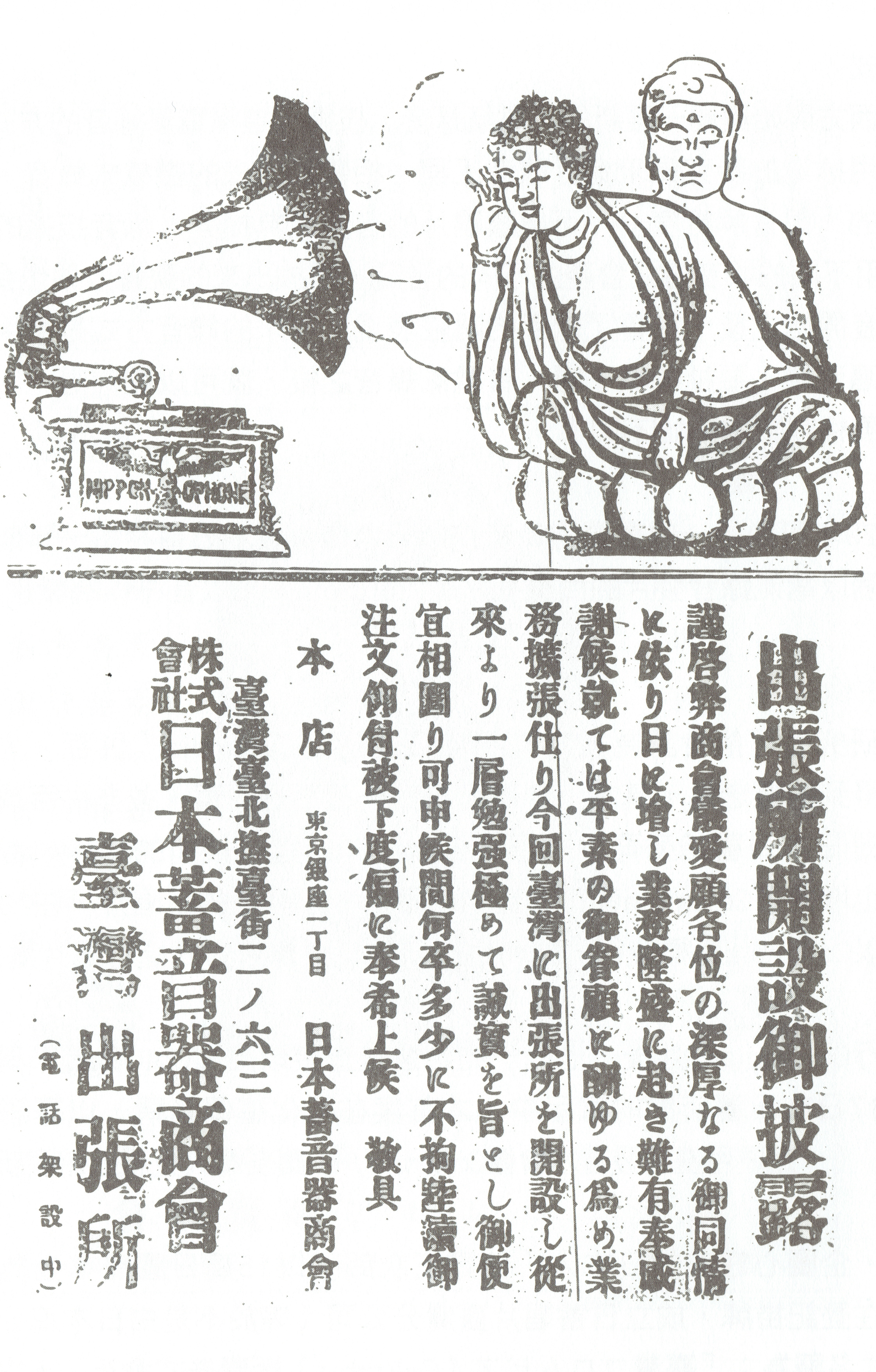
Ads of Nippon Gumiho Shokai

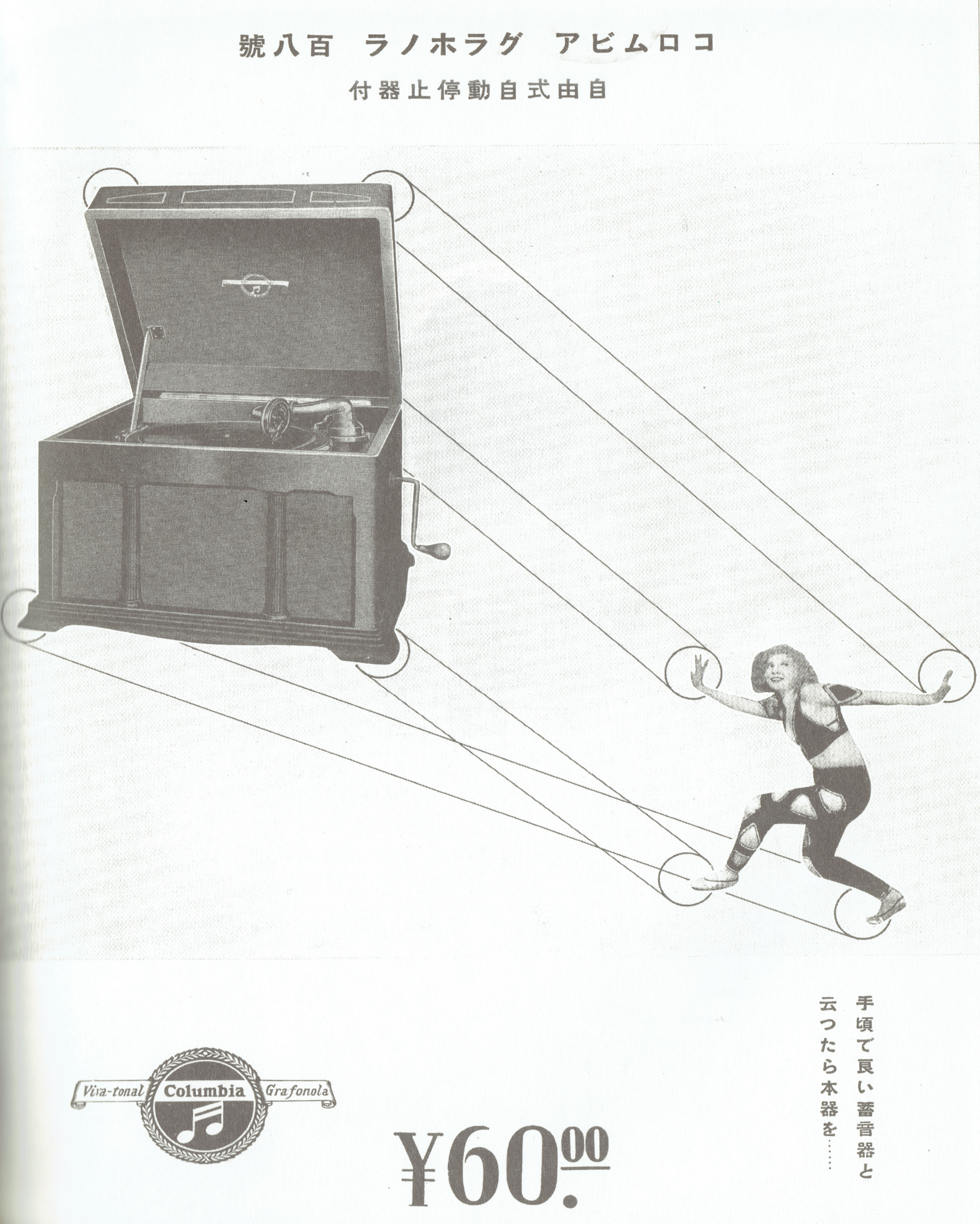
Ads of Columbia Records

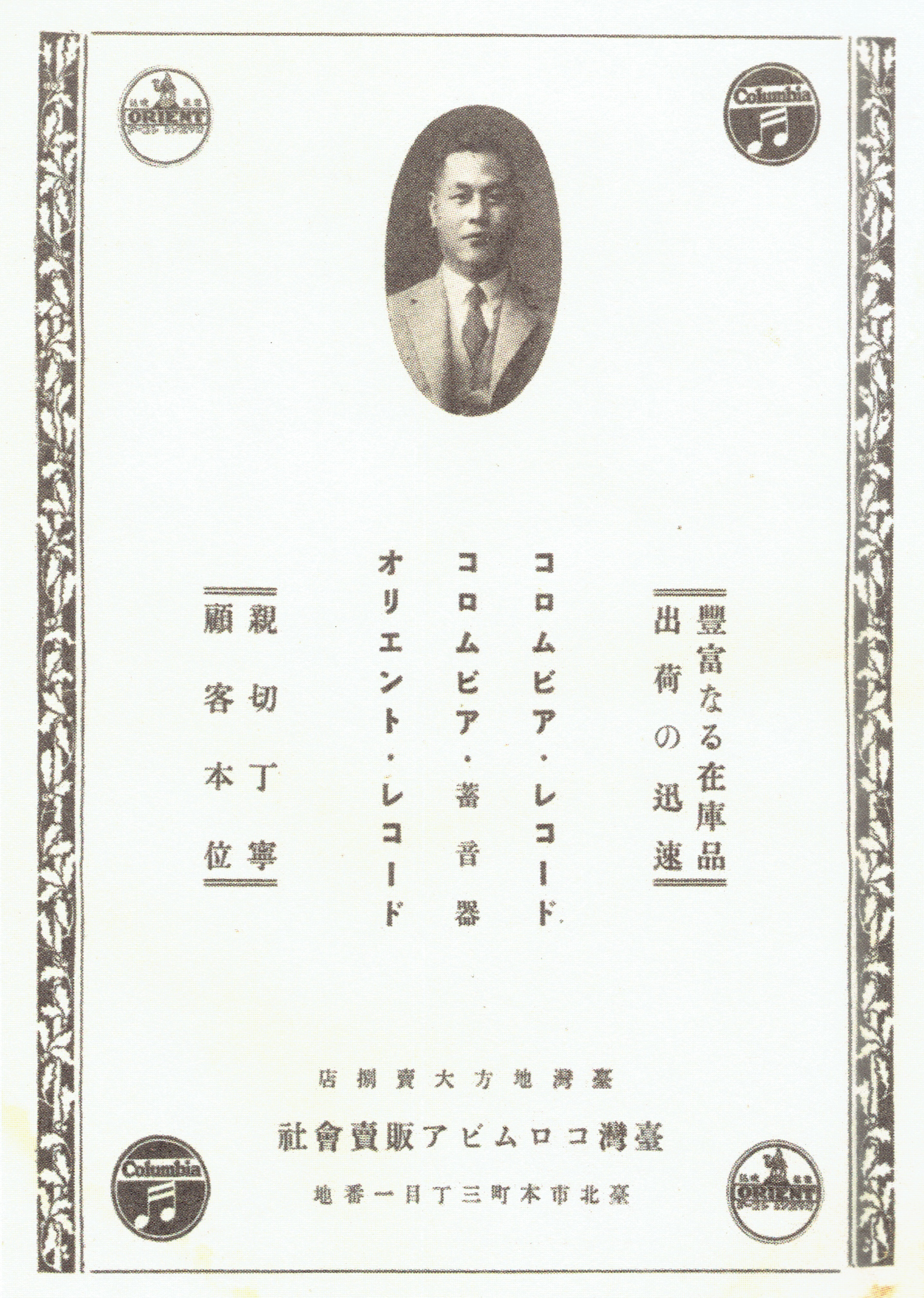
Ads of Columbia Records
