= Yao Su-jung =

Yao Su-jung 姚蘇蓉
- Born: December 5, 1945 (age 80); Republic of China Chengdu, Sichuan Province
- Origin: Republic of China
- Occupation: Singer
- Years active: 1966–present

'Yao Su-jung (Chinese name: 姚蘇蓉, P'inyin: Yáo Sūróng; born December 5, 1945) is a Taiwanese singer who rose to prominence in the 1960s. She is known as the Queen of Tears, the Queen of Forbidden Songs and the Queen of Southeast Asian Songs. In 1966, she won first prize in a singing competition organised by Cheng Sheng Radio, capturing the attention of the judges. With the assistance of her teacher, Wong Cing-si, she signed with the Haishan Record Company and entered the entertainment industry. Her hit song "Faithless Person" propelled her to stardom, and her theme song for the film "Not Coming Home Tonight" became a hit throughout Southeast Asia. With her distinctive and powerful singing style, she quickly rose to superstar status in the Chinese music industry. She currently lives in Kuala Lumpur, Malaysia.

== History ==
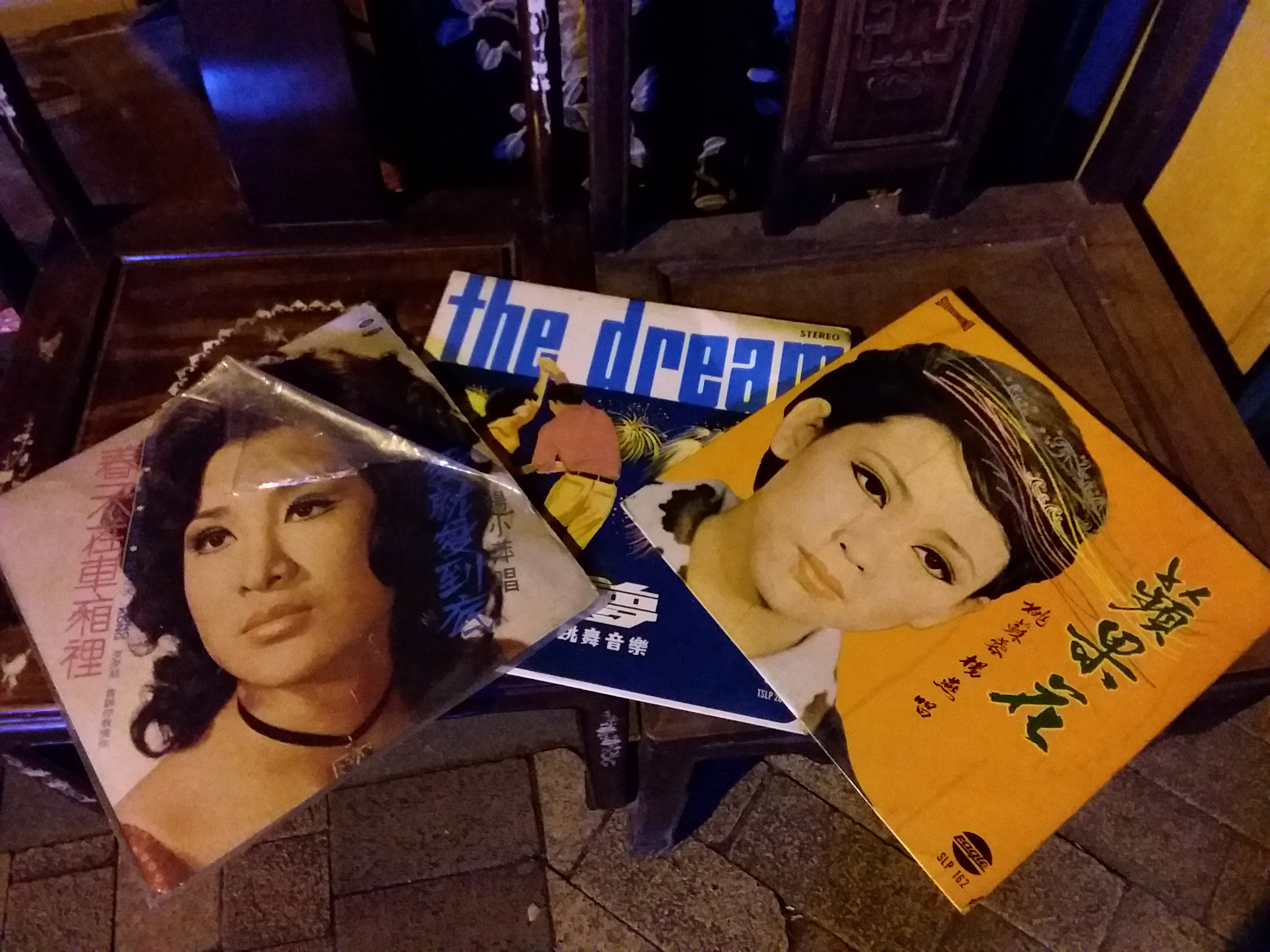

In 1967, she earned the title of "Queen of Tears" with her song "The One I Miss". But her real success came with the theme song for the movie "Not Coming Home Tonight". This song combined both modern and traditional elements, thereby paving a new path of popularity for her. The success of "Not Coming Home Tonight" was a positive and innovative recognition for both the composer, Charles Tso, and Yao Su-jung. They later collaborated on many songs that became known as the "Yao School" including "Faithless Person" (Chinese: 負心的人) and "Like Mist and Flowers" (Chinese: 像霧又像花).

Formerly a singer who had performed theme songs for numerous films, Yao Su-jung had retreated from the limelight and had been living in seclusion in Kuala Lumpur after her public performance at the 30th Golden Horse Awards. However, she made a comeback in the "Wei Wei Dao Lai (偉韋道來)" live broadcast programme created by Singaporean entertainment industry veterans Ou Wei-yi and versatile host Chen Wei-lin at the end of 2020. On the fourth day of the Lunar New Year in 2021, she made another appearance on the show and engaged in a video chat with iconic stars such as Chang Chia-chen, Hu Chin, and Debbie Chou.
