= Hakka popular music =

History of Chinese dialect music

Hakka popular music (abbreviated as Hakkapop) is a genre of popular music composed and performed in the Hakka language, also known as modern Hakka music. It is mainly prevalent in Malaysia, Taiwan, Indonesia, and Guangdong. Taiwanese Hakka popular music being the most vibrant and developed.

== Origin of Hakka popular music ==
Before the 1970s, the Hakka music scene featured commercialized Hakka traditional music records, including traditional Hakka narrative singing, mountain songs, and Hakka ballads. Inspired by the creation of Cantonese songs in a Western style in the Hong Kong music scene, Malaysia and Taiwan simultaneously embarked on the development of Hakka popular music starting from the 1970s.

=== Malaysia ===
In 1978, Malaysian musician Chong Sau Lin met Chinese singer Chew Chin Yuin (邱清雲). Chong adapted Sam Hui's Cantonese song "Genius and Idiot" into a Hakka version called "Ah Po Selling Salted Vegetables" for Chew to perform. The song became a sensation in Malaysia, selling over 100,000 copies. This marked the beginning of the development of Hakka music in Malaysia for more than two decades.

=== Taiwan ===
At the same time, Taiwanese composer Wu Shengzhi (吳盛智) was also influenced by Sam Hui's Cantonese pop songs from Hong Kong. This inspired him to create music in the Hakka language. Wu then collaborated with Tu Minheng (涂敏恆) to produce Hakka pop music, releasing Taiwan's first Hakka pop song record in 1981.

== Development of Hakka popular music ==
=== Malaysia ===
Malaysian music producer Zhang Shaolin adapted popular Cantonese songs from Hong Kong into Hakka songs and released them locally. These songs became popular in Malaysia, Singapore, and even Hakka-speaking areas in Indonesia. This period saw the rise of artists like Tsinyun Hiu and Xie Lingling (謝玲玲). Tsinyun Hiu, known as the "King of Hakka Songs" in Malaysia, was a popular Chinese singer in the 1980s. The songs of this era were characterized by reflecting the voices of the lower social classes and common people. Zhang Shaolin composed thousands of songs, but by the 1990s, his music style had diverged from the tastes of younger audiences. With no successors, the Hakka pop music market in Malaysia gradually declined.

=== Taiwan ===
In the 1980s, several well-known Hakka record companies were established in Taiwan, including Hanxing Communications (漢興傳播), LUNG KO CULTURE (龍閣文化) and Jisheng Film and Television. In 1989, Tu Minheng's "Hakka Essence" reminded Hakka people not to forget their roots and urged them not to forget the hardships their ancestors faced when developing the land. This song became one of the most representative songs for Taiwan's Hakka people.

During this period, Taiwanese Hakka music was influenced by Minnan-language Nakashi songs. Although there was significant progress, the lack of innovation in the tunes meant that the age of the audience tended to be older, and the popularity of the music was still mostly limited to Hakka-speaking areas. After the deaths of Wu Shengzhi, Lin Ziyuan (林子淵), and Tu Minheng, the development of Taiwan's Hakka music scene experienced a period of silence. The visibility of Hakka popular music gradually increased after the rise of the Hakka movement in Taiwan in the 1990s.

== Hakka new music ==
Starting from the 1990s, Taiwanese society began to place more emphasis on ethnic culture and local characteristics, prompting many Hakka musicians to engage in Hakka music creation. From 2003 onwards, the number of Hakka music records released in Taiwan increased significantly, and with the help of various media platforms, Hakka music gradually entered the youth-oriented popular music market. Additionally, the popularity of the internet broke the geographical limitations traditionally associated with Hakka media.

=== Diversified development ===
During this period, record companies maintained the existing Hakka music market for middle-aged and older audiences. Veteran music producers Alex Tang (Dong Dong), Liu Shau Hi, Fu Yeming (傅也鳴), Yan Zhiwen (顏志文), Hsieh Yu-Wei (謝宇威), Ayugo Huang (黃連煜), Huang Zixuan (黃子軒), and Liu Rongchang (劉榮昌) also successively entered the Hakka pop music scene from the Chinese pop music industry.

Starting from 2004, the Taiwan Music Composition and Songwriting Contest have been held annually, discovering many emerging musical talents in the process. The new generation of musicians during this period gradually broke free from traditional Hakka constraints, creating music based on contemporary life experiences and popular styles, injecting vitality into Hakka pop music.

=== Promotion of Hakka pop music by the Hakka Affairs Council of the Republic of China ===
As Taiwan's society increasingly focused on ethnic culture, the Chang Chun-Hsiung (張俊雄) Cabinet established the Hakka Affairs Council under the Executive Yuan in 2001, elevating Hakka policies to the level of the central government. Various county and city governments also established dedicated Hakka affairs units. Since 2002, the Hakka Affairs Council has promoted the development of Hakka language popular music, organizing the Hakka Wind Summer Concerts (夏客風演唱會), which tour various locations in Taiwan. They also held Hakka MV creation competitions, rewarding the efforts of many singer-songwriters, such as Xu Qianshun (徐千舜). In addition, a Hakka television station was established, providing a media platform with greater exposure for the Hakka language. Moreover, the Golden Melody Awards established the Best Hakka Singer Award and Best Hakka Pop Music Album Award in 2003 and 2005, respectively.

=== Internet broadcasting ===
Due to the widespread use of the internet, Hakka music during this period was no longer limited to local radio stations in Hakka-speaking areas. Hakka pop songs from various regions were transmitted to more distant locations through the internet. In Indonesia's West Java province, many artists created reworkings of Chinese pop songs in Hakka. Inspired by Hokkien and Cantonese pop music, Chinese Hakka music creators also began to experiment with composing Hakka pop music.
