= Xinjian Township, Ningnan County =

Xinjian Township 新建乡
- Township
- Location in Sichuan
- Coordinates (Xinjian Township government): 27°13′46″N 102°34′42″E
- Country: People's Republic of China
- Province: Sichuan
- Autonomous prefecture: Liangshan
- County: Ningnan
- Time zone: UTC+8 (China Standard)

Xinjian Township (simplified Chinese: 新建乡; traditional Chinese: 新建鄉; pinyin: Xīnjiàn Xiāng) is a township under the administration of Ningnan County, in southern Sichuan, China. As of 2018, it has four villages under its administration.
