= Lin Hau =

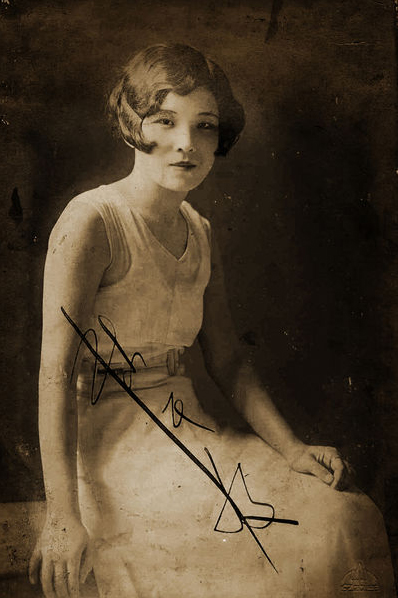
Autographed photo of Lin Hau (provided by Lin Zhang-Feng).

Lin Hau (Chinese: 林氏好; Pe̍h-ōe-jī: Lîm Sī-hòⁿ) (1907-1991), birth name Lin Shi-Hao (林是好, Pe̍h-ōe-jī: Lîm Sī-hòⁿ), also known by her stage name Lin Li-mei (林麗美, Pe̍h-ōe-jī: Lîm Lē-bí), was a female musician and vocalist during the Japanese rule period in Taiwan. She was active in the Taiwanese music scene of the 1930s, specializing in reinterpreting Taiwanese folk songs using the techniques of artistic vocal performance.

Lin actively engaged in public affairs and was elected as a city council member in Tainan City in the simulated Taiwan State and Municipal Council Elections organized by the Taiwan New People Newspaper in 1931. She also participated in women's movements, such as the Tainan Young Women's Association and the organization Yun Xiang Yin Society. Her husband, Lu Ping-ting, was one of the leaders of the Taiwanese cultural movement and was involved in organizations like the Taiwanese Cultural Association and the Taiwanese People's Party.

== Life ==
Lin was born on 15 October 1907. After her father's death, she was raised in Tainan by her mother, who sold pastries. Lin's early experience in music came while attending the Taipingjing Presbyterian Church. She also considered Tamaki Miura to be influential. Aged 16, Lin started teaching music at Tainan Third Public School. A colleague introduced her to his brother Lu Ping-ting, and the couple dated for a few months before marrying during the Qixi Festival later that year. In March 1924, Lin transferred to the Tainan Second Preschool, and taught there until her dismissal in June 1928, due to her husband's activism against Japanese authorities.

In 1932, Lin Hau was selected in a singer recruitment competition and became a Taiwanese popular music singer under the Geronimo Records label. She recorded songs such as A Red Egg and Moon Night Sorrow, which was adapted from Taiwanese indigenous music. She learned piano and vocal techniques from Margaret Mellis Gauld and an Italian musician of Tainan Theological College and Seminary. She later went to Japan to study music performance techniques under Japanese vocal artist Toshiko Sekiya.

Lin collaborated extensively with the Yu-tsung Symphony Orchestra in Pingtung, Taiwan. She was involved in the preparation and promotion of the Nanxing (Southern Stars) Song and Dance Troupe and conducted field research on indigenous music in Taiwan's mountainous areas. She continued to contribute to social welfare services and educational work. After 1960, Lin focused on talent cultivation and assisted her daughter-in-law, Lin Xiang-yun, in developing careers in singing and dancing such as establishing the Lin Hau Song and Dance Institute and the Lin Xiang-yun Dance Troupe.
