= The Beautiful Island =

"美麗島"

Song
- Language: Chinese Mandarin
- English title: Formosa (The Beautiful Island)
- Published: 1978
- Composer: Lee Shuang-tse (李雙澤)
- Lyricist: Liang Ching-fong (梁景峰)

Formosa (The Beautiful Island) (Chinese: 美麗島; pinyin: Měilì dǎo; Zhuyin Fuhao: ㄇㄟˇ ㄌㄧˋ ㄉㄠˇ) is a Taiwanese folk song by Lee Shuang-tse (李雙澤). The song was adapted from Chen Hsiu-hsi (陳秀喜)'s poem Taiwan by Liang Ching-fong (梁景峰) and is among the most famous of Lee's works. After the song was first performed by Yang Tzu-chun (楊祖珺)and Kimbo Hu (胡德夫) in 1977, Yang Tzu-chun included it in her 1978 album.

== History ==
In 1980, the Government Information Office officially banned the song "Formosa". However, in 1990 (three years after martial law was lifted in Taiwan), the general leader of the Wild Lily student movement melodiously sang it.

In 2006, Million Voices against Corruption, President Chen Must Go (百萬人民倒扁運動) and Kimbo Hu led supporters in a rendition of "Formosa".

On 20 May 2016, at the inauguration ceremony of Tsai Ing-wen as president, people sang the song along with her and Vice President Chen. There was a protest on this event on Facebook by the indigenous people of Taiwan, who felt that the ceremony was full of Chinese chauvinism.

== Lyrics controversy ==
篳路藍縷，以啟山林。

— "Formosa (The Beautiful Island)"

Taiwanese aboriginal poet Monaneng (莫那能) is Lee Shuang-tse's friend. After a long night of drinking, the poets began to sing. Lee said to him, "Brother, I just wrote a song. Let me sing it to you," at which point Lee then sang "The Beautiful Island." Monaneng then asked some questions about the song after he had heard it: "Why does the song mention Water buffalo (水牛), rather than the Formosan black bear?"; "Why say 'cut the tree' (以啟山林)? Our ancestors say one can't cut trees of nature." But Lee did not answer.
