= Matzka =

Matzka is a surname. Notable people with the surname include:

- Ralf Matzka (born 1989), German cyclist
- Scott Matzka (1978–2018), American ice hockey player
