= Yang Hsien (singer) =

Taiwanese folk singer (1950–2025)

Yang Hsien 楊弦
- Born: 2 September 1950; Hualien, Taiwan
- Died: 14 December 2025 (aged 75)
- Occupation: Singer

Yang Hsien (Chinese: 楊弦; pinyin: Yáng Xián; 2 September 1950 – 14 December 2025) was a Taiwanese folk singer.

== Early life, education, and music experience ==
Born in Hualien, Taiwan, his mother was an accountant and his father served as the chairman of the Hualien County Party Committee of the Kuomintang. When Yang Hsien was four years old, his father died, and he and his mother moved to Taipei.

Yang Hsien attended college at National Taiwan University where he studied agricultural chemistry, during which time he joined the choir, which began his interest in music. Later, Yang Hsien bought himself a guitar, sheet music, and taught himself how to sing. He attended NTU's Institute of Oceanography for graduate school, and in his free time he would go to the Columbia Café on Zhongshan North Road to listen to singers such as Parangalan. In addition, Yang Hsien would also occasionally sing English songs on stage.

== Folk music movement ==
The 1970s saw the decline of Taiwan's status on the international stage: the ROC was kicked out of the UN, and the United States severed official ties. Meanwhile, the youth of the island were still enamored with Western culture. In this environment, a self-awareness and appreciation of one's own culture began to slowly spring up. Tired of the superficial Mandarin pop songs, and the Western songs that had no connection to his own culture, Yang Hsien began to try to create songs that were different from the past. He set Yu Kwang-chung's poem "Four Rhymes of Nostalgia" (鄉愁四韻) to music, and performed it at Parangalan's personal concert in the summer of 1974. He played guitar with piano and violin accompaniment, and even invited Yu to attend the concert in person. Yu Kwang-chung was pleased with Yang Hsien's ambitious creativity. Encouraged by this, and with the author's permission, Yang Hsien continued to create more songs from Yu Kwang-chung's collection of poems, "White Jade Bitter Melon" (白玉苦瓜), which were first performed on 6 June 1979 at Zhongshan Hall in Taipei, under the name "Modern Folk Song Concert". The first half of the concert consisted of English songs, while the second half featured the songs featuring Yu's poetry. In total, there were nine pieces set to Yu's work, all of which were featured on Yang Hsien's first album, "Modern Chinese Folk Song Collection". This album is considered to be the first album worthy of being called a "Folk Song" album. The first printing of 30,000 copies sold out within a month, and the next four months saw three subsequent reprintings, which serves as a testament to how popular Yang Hsien's concerts were.

The style of Yang Hsien's pieces have the breath of the traditional Chinese arts, while also having absorbed American folk and country music elements. This had never been seen before in Taiwan in the 1970s. By breaking free of the existing folk music styles, Yang Hsien and Yu Kwang-chung's methods drew the ire of the traditional music school, opening another public debate about "Modern Chinese Folk Songs," in addition to the already existing Taiwan Native Literature debate. Following this, in 1976, Yang Hsien's middle school classmate and fellow Columbia Café regular Lee Shuang-tse began the "Sing Your Own Songs" movement, officially starting the campus folk music era. Just as the folk song movement was in full swing, Yang, known now as the "Father of Modern Folk Songs", released his second solo album "West Out of Yangguan" (西出陽關) in 1977, and held two "Farewell" concerts. Thus, he left the pop music scene and went to the United States to study Chinese medicine.

== Later developments ==
In 1982, Yang Hsien's mother died, and he moved to the United States. In San Francisco, he received a doctorate in Oriental Medicine from the San Francisco College of Acupuncture, and started his own health food company called Bao Sheng (寶生), where he served as the president.

After releasing "West Out of Yangguan," Yang Hsien no longer made musical production his life's most important goal, but instead as a way to relax. For example, Yang wrote a series of songs expressing his thoughts on the Tiananmen Square massacre, including, "Mom, We Did It All For You" (媽媽我們都是為了您), "Mom, I’m Hungry" (媽媽我餓了), and "Protest Song" (抗暴謠). He performed on stage in folk concerts in Taipei in 2002, 2004, and 2005. 26 September 2008 saw the "Rondo of Poetry and Song" folk music concert in celebration of Yu Kwang-chung's 80th birthday, where Yang and other greats including Li Jianfu, Bao Meishing, and Su Lai sang on stage in a stirring tribute to the inspirations and creators of the folk song movement.

Yang returned to Taiwan in 2021, and had a stroke in November of that year. He died from complications of the stroke on 14 December 2025, at the age of 75.
