= Where Chou =

Taiwanese singer and actress

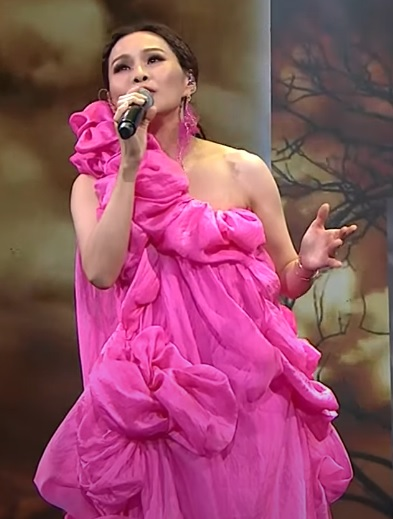
- Chou performing at the 57th Golden Bell Awards, October 2022
- Born: Chou Huei; 26 March 1977 (age 49); Kaohsiung, Taiwan
- Other name: Where Chou (蕙兒)
- Education: Chung-Hwa School of Arts
- Occupations: Singer; songwriter; actress
- Years active: 1999–present
- Musical career
- Genres: Mandopop
- Instrument: Vocals
- Labels: Linfair Records (1999-2003); Sony BMG Taiwan (2004-2007); M'stones International (2009-2012; 2025-); HIM International Music (2013–2024)

Chinese name
- Chinese: 周蕙
- Hanyu Pinyin: Zhōu Huì

Where Chou (Chinese: 周蕙; born 26 March 1977) is a Taiwanese singer, songwriter and actress. Chou released her debut album Where Chou Collection in 1999, which sold more than a million copies in Asia. Along with Stefanie Sun, Elva Hsiao and Jolin Tsai, Chou was regarded as one of the Four Upcoming Divas of Mandopop music in the late 1990s and early 2000s.

== Discography ==
=== Studio albums ===
Title	Album details
Where Chou Collection 周蕙精選	Released: 10 September 1999; Label: Linfair Records [福茂唱片 (Chinese Only)]; Formats: CD, digital download
Where Chou Collection 2 – Want to Love You Well 周蕙精選2 – 好想好好愛你	Released: 18 September 2000; Label: Linfair Records; Formats: CD, digital download
Where Chou Collection 3 – Lonely City 周蕙精選3 – 寂寞城市	Released: 28 August 2002; Label: Linfair Records; Formats: CD, digital download
Blossomy 綻放	Released: 8 June 2007; Label: Sony BMG Taiwan; Formats: CD, digital download
Where Chou 周蕙	Released: 19 June 2009; Label: M’stones International; Formats: CD, digital download
Own Room 自己的房間	Released: 18 October 2011; Label: M’stones International; Formats: CD, digital download
Beautiful World 我看見的世界	Released: 11 October 2013; Label: HIM International Music; Formats: CD, digital download
Dawned On Me 豁然律	Released: 11 December 2020; Label: HIM International Music; Formats: CD, digital download

=== Cover albums ===
Title	Album details
This Precious Night 今宵多珍重	Released: 31 December 2001; Label: Linfair Records; Formats: CD, digital download
I Want Your Love 我要你的愛	Released: 31 December 2001; Label: Linfair Records; Formats: CD, digital download
A Beautiful Lost Time 不被遺忘的時光	Released: 20 July 2018; Label: HIM International Music; Formats: CD, digital download
Back 2 the Beautiful Lost Time 不被遺忘的時光2	Released: 16 September 2022; Label: HIM International Music; Formats: CD, digital download

=== Compilation albums ===
Title	Album details
Where Chou Final Edition 蕙兒絕版	Released: 14 February 2003; Label: Linfair Records; Formats: CD, digital download
25	Released: 10 May 2024; Label: HIM International Music; Formats: CD, digital download

=== Singles ===
Title	Single details
Dear Passerby 過客	Released: 25 April 2025; Label: M'stones International; Formats: Digital download

== Filmography ==
=== Television series ===
Year	English title	Original title	Role	Notes
2020	Workers	[做工的人]	Pei-pei	

=== Film ===
Year	English title	Original title	Role	Notes
2022	The Biggest Misunderstanding Ever	[世界上最大的誤會]	Customer	Short film
