= Lee Lim-chhiu =

Taiwanese songwriter

- Born: April 22, 1909; Taiwan
- Died: February 12, 1979 (aged 69); Taiwan
- Occupation: Musician
Lee Lim-chhiu
- Traditional Chinese: 李臨秋
Transcriptions
Standard Mandarin
- Hanyu Pinyin: Lǐ Línqiū
Southern Min
- Hokkien POJ: Lí Lím-chhiu

Lee Lim-chhiu (Chinese: 李臨秋; 22 April 1909 – 12 February 1979), or Lee Lin-chiu in Mandarin, was a Taiwanese songwriter. He was born in Taipei, graduated from the public school in 1922 and did not receive any further education. Lee was the writer of Bang Chhun Hong, a well-known popular Hokkien song which was composed by Teng U-hian. Additionally, he also wrote some other songs such as Su Kui Hong (四季紅) and Po Phoa Bang (補破網)
