= Tan Kun-giok =

- Born: 1905; Daitōtei, Taihoku, Japanese Taiwan
- Died: 4 March 1963 (aged 56–57); Taiwan
- Occupations: Songwriter and author

Chinese name
- Traditional Chinese: 陳君玉
Transcriptions
- Musical career
- Labels: Columbia Records

Tan Kun-giok (Chinese: 陳君玉; 1906 – 4 March 1963), also known as Chen Chun-yu in Mandarin, was a Taiwanese songwriter and author born in Daitōtei. He wrote many Taiwanese Hokkien songs such as Thiau Bu Si Tai (跳舞時代) and Siu Be Toa Kang Tiau (想要彈像調), and had served as an officer of Columbia Records, a Japanese-owned disc company. Tan could speak Mandarin Chinese fluently, he was an introducer of Mandarin to postwar Taiwan. Tan died from hepatic cancer in 1963.
