= Chiu Thiam-ōng =

Taiwanese lyricist

- 周添旺
- Born: January 25, 1911; Taipei City Menga Bopiliao
- Died: 1988 (aged 76–77); Taiwan
- Occupation: lyricist
- Notable work: Rainy Night Flower, White Magnolia
- Partner: Ai-Ai (愛愛)

Chiu Thiam-ōng (Mandarin: 周添旺, January 25, 1911 – 1988) was a Taiwanese pop music lyricist during the Japanese rule period, born in Monga Bopiliao (present-day Wanhua), Taipei City, and registered on December 25, 1910 on the lunar calendar. He is one of the longest-standing lyricists in Taiwan, with representative works such as 'Rainy Night Flower' (Mandarin: 雨夜花), 'Spring Dream Beside the River' (Mandarin: 河邊春夢) and 'White Magnolia' (Mandarin: 孤戀花).

In 1977, his song 'Northwest Rain' won the CTV Golden Melody Award.

== Life and career ==
Born in Monga, Taipei City, Chiu Thiam-ōng studied Chinese at the age of six and graduated from Dadaocheng Rih-Shin Public School and Cheng-Yuan Middle School. In 1933, he joined Columbia Records and won the public's attention with the lyrics of 'Moonlight Sorrow' (Mandarin: 月夜愁). In the following year, he took over Chen Junyu's position as the director of the literary department of the record company. During this period, he collaborated with Teng Yu-hsien on the Taiwanese-language song 'Rainy Night Flower' (Mandarin: 雨夜花), featuring the singer Pure, and released 'Heart Brocken Flower' (Mandarin: 碎心花), and 'Spring Dream Beside River' (Mandarin: 河邊春夢), which established him as a Taiwanese pop singer. In 1948, he met Yang San Lang (Mandarin: 楊三郎), and the two collaborated on 'White Magnolia' (Mandarin: 孤戀花), 'Autumn Wind Midnight Rain' (Mandarin: 秋風夜雨) and 'Faraway On A Moonlit Night' (Mandarin: 異鄉夜月).

== Writing and production ==
'Moonlight Sorrow' was published in 1933, with lyrics by Chiu Thiam-ōng and music by Teng Yu-hsien, who was 24 years old at the time. The song was the first of his life's compositions, but it established him as one of Taiwan's most popular singers. Moonlight Sorrow' is a 17-bar song that uses three Fa's that are not in the pentatonic scale, and the lyrics talk about the emotions of missing one's lover.

The lyrics of 'Rainy Night Flower' describe a girl from the countryside who came to Taipei to work and fell in love with a boy, and then the girl was abandoned by the boy and fell into the wind and dust of the world. It is heartbreaking and regrettable. The words "rain," "night," and "flower" described in the lyrics later became important thematic images in Taiwanese ballads. The song was later adapted into a Japanese song and popularized by the Japanese.

During the Japanese rule era, in order to carry out the imperialization campaign, Japan changed 'Rainy Night Flower' into a song to inspire Taiwanese soldiers to fight for the Japanese Emperor, and 'Moonlight Sorrow' into a song about a soldier's wife.

'Spring Dream Beside River' was written in 1935 in Japanese-era Taiwan by Japanese singer Matsubara Jingyun. Chiu Thiam-ōng and Ai Ai (Mandarin: 愛愛) entered Columbia on May 1, 1933, at the same time. Ai Ai was 16 years old at the time, and lived in Xinzhuang, near the Danshuei River. Chiu Thiam-ōng often invited Ai Ai to take a walk along the Danshui River. At that time, the people were conservative and Ai Ai was a popular singer, so Chiu Thiam-ōng did not dare to tell Ai Ai about the love in his heart, so he put his sadness and love in the lyrics of ‘Spring Dream Beside River’.

== Life and career ==
TV drama
| Year | Works | Performer |
|---|---|---|
| 2012 | The First Sound of Songs (歌謠風華-初聲) | Kelvin Chow (周凱文) |
