= Bāng Chhun-hong =

Taiwanese Hokkien song

"望(Bāng) 春風(Chhun-hong)"
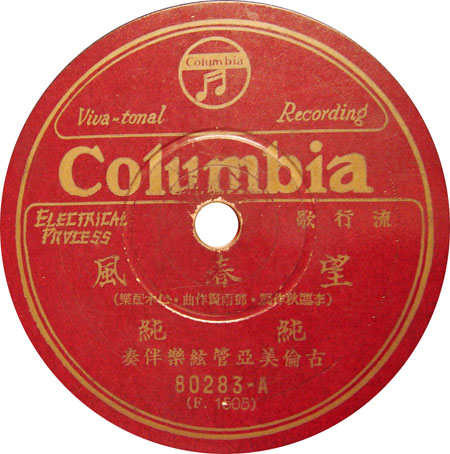
- A label of an early record

Song
- Language: Taiwanese Hokkien
- Published: 1933
- Label: Columbia Records (古倫美亞唱片)
- Songwriter: Lee Lin-chiu
- Composer: Teng Yu-hsien

Bāng Chhun-hong

Chinese name
- Traditional Chinese: 望春風
- Simplified Chinese: 望春风
Transcriptions
Standard Mandarin
- Hanyu Pinyin: Wàng Chūnfēng
Southern Min
- Hokkien POJ: Bāng Chhun-hong
- Tâi-lô: Bāng Tshun-hong

Japanese name
- Kanji: 望春風
- Hiragana: ぼうしゅんぷう
Transcriptions
- Revised Hepburn: Bōshunfū

Bāng Chhun-hong is a Taiwanese Hokkien song composed by Teng Yu-hsien, a Hakka Taiwanese musician, and written by Lee Lin-chiu. The song was one of their representative works. It was released by Columbia Records in 1933, and originally sung by several female singers at that time, such as Sun-sun, Ai-ai (愛愛) or Iam-iam (豔豔). The title (望春風) literally means "Longing for the Spring Breeze".

Bāng Chhun-hong was once adapted into a Japanese patriotic song as "Daichi wa maneku" (Japanese: 大地は招く), literally means "The Mother Earth is Calling on You". It was re-written by Koshiji Shirou (越路詩郎) and sung by Kirishima Noboru (霧島昇). The song has also been released in Japan by Hitoto Yo, a Japanese pop singer. Many Taiwanese singers have covered the song, such as Teresa Teng, Showlen Maya, Feng Fei-fei, Stella Chang, and David Tao.

Since this song's publication, films with similar titles have been released, such as the 1937 film directed by Andou Tarou (安藤太郎), and a 1977 film which has an English name of "The Operations of Spring Wind". Bāng Chhun-hong has frequently been used as background music in Taiwanese films or teleplays. It is also a theme in the soundtrack of Singapore Dreaming, a 2006 released Singaporean film.

A biographical novel of the same name was written by Chung Chao-cheng, discussing the life of Teng Yu-hsien, the song's composer.

== Lyrics ==
=== Original lyric ===
Traditional Han characters	Pe̍h-ōe-jī
獨夜無伴守燈下，清風對面吹； 十七八，未出嫁，見著少年家； 果然標致面肉白，誰家人子弟？ 想欲問伊驚歹勢，心內彈琵琶。 想欲郎君做翁婿，意愛在心內； 待何時，君來採，青春花當開； 忽聽外頭有人來，開門(共伊)看覓； 月老笑阮戇大呆，予風騙毋知。	To̍k iā bô phōaⁿ siú teng-ē, chheng-hong tùi bīn chhe Cha̍p-chhit-poeh, bōe chhut-kè, kìⁿ-tio̍h siàu-liân-ke Kó-jiân piau-tì bīn-bah pe̍h, sûi ke lâng chú-tē Siūⁿ-boeh mn̄g i kiaⁿ phái-sè, sim-lāi tōaⁿ pî-pê Siūⁿ-boeh liông-kun choh ang-sài, ì-ài chāi sim-lāi Thāi hô-sî, kun lâi chhái, chheng-chhun hoe tng-khai Hut thiaⁿ gōa-thâu ū lâng lâi, khui-mn̂g kai khòaⁿ-bāi Go̍at-ló chhiò gún gōng-tōa-tai, hō͘ hong phiàn m̄-chai
English translation
At night waiting alone under a dim lamp, with the spring breeze blowing on my cheeks, I, an unmarried maiden of seventeen going on eighteen, see a young man. I see he has a handsome face and a pale complexion; I wonder which family he is from? Wanting to ask him yet fearing embarrassment, my heart flutters as if it were a pipa being strummed. Wishing him to be the groom of mine, with love inside my heart. Waiting, wondering when my beau might come to gather my blooming flowers of youth. Suddenly I hear someone outside, and I open the door to see, The moon laughs at my foolishness, for I did not realize it was just the wind.

=== Present-day lyric ===
Traditional Han characters	Pe̍h-ōe-jī
獨夜無伴守燈下，清/春/冷風對面吹； 十七八歲未出嫁，拄/搪/想/看著少年家； 果然標致面肉白，誰/啥/(啥人)家人子弟？ 想欲問伊驚歹勢，心內彈琵琶。 想欲郎君做翁婿，意愛在心內； 等待何時君來採，青春花當開； 聽見外面有人來，開門來/共看覓； 月娘笑阮戇大呆，予風騙毋知。	To̍k iā bô phōaⁿ siú teng-ē, chheng/chhun-hong tùi bīn chhoe Cha̍p-chhit-peh hòe bōe chhut-kè, tú/tn̄g/siūⁿ/khuàⁿ-tio̍h siàu-liân-ke Kó-jiân piau-tì bīn-bah pe̍h, sûi/siáⁿ/siáng ka lâng chú-tē Siūⁿ-beh mn̄g i kiaⁿ phái-sè, sim-lāi tôaⁿ gî/pî-pê Siūⁿ-beh lông-kun chè/chòe ang-sài, ì-ài chāi sim-lāi Tán-thāi hô-sî kun lâi chhái, chheng-chhun hoa/hoe tong khai Thiaⁿ-kìⁿ gōa-bīn ū lâng lâi, khui-mn̂g lâi/ka khòaⁿ-bāi Go̍eh-niû chhiò gún gōng-tōa-tai, hō͘ hong phiàn m̄-chai

† In the modern version, the word Go̍at-ló (Yue Lao, a god of marriage), is replaced by go̍eh-niû (moon).

== Media ==
Bang Chhun Hong (望春風)
Written by Lee Lin-chiu, composed by Teng Yu-hsien, sung by "Sun-sun"

Daichi wa maneku (大地は招く)
Written by Koshiji Shirou, originally composed by Teng Yu-hsien, sung by Kirishima Noboru

== See also ==
- Taiwanese pop
