= Teng Yu-hsien =

Taiwanese Hakka musician

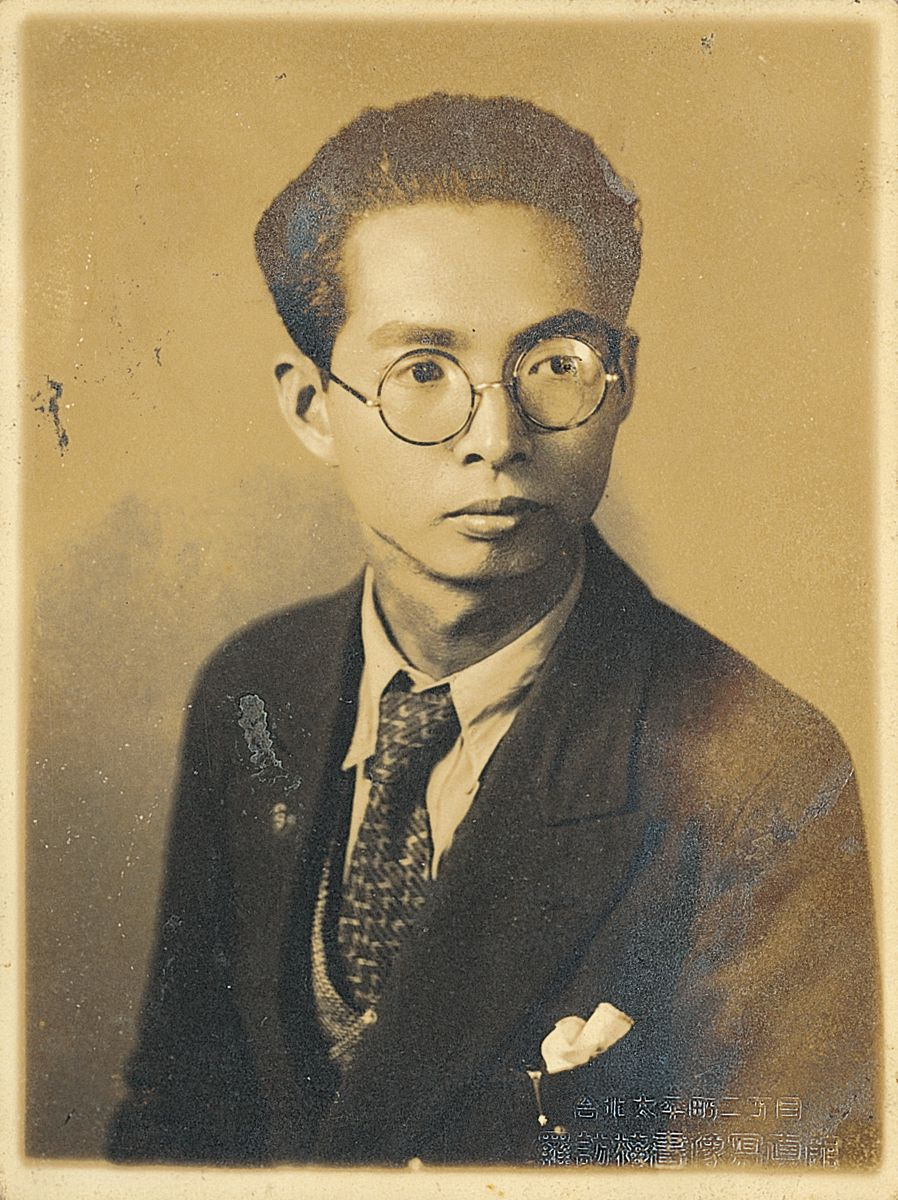
- Teng Yu-hsien, taken by the photo studio of Luo Fang-mei (羅訪梅).
- Born: July 21, 1906; Ryūtan, Tōshien Chō (modern-day Longtan, Taoyuan), Japanese Taiwan
- Died: June 11, 1944 (aged 37); Kyūrin Village, Chikutō District, Shinchiku Prefecture (modern-day Qionglin, Hsinchu), Japanese Taiwan
- Other names: Karasaki Yosame; Higashida Gyōu
- Occupation: Musician

Chinese name
- Traditional Chinese: 鄧雨賢
Transcriptions
Hakka
- Romanization: Then Yí-hièn
Southern Min
- Hokkien POJ: Tēng Ú-hiân

Teng Yu-hsien (Chinese: 鄧雨賢; Pe̍h-ōe-jī: Tēng Ú-hiân, Hakka: Then Yí-hièn; 21 July 1906 – 11 June 1944) was a Taiwanese Hakka musician. He is noted for composing many well-known Hokkien songs. Teng gave himself a Japanese-style pen-name as Karasaki Yau (唐崎夜雨) and a formal name called Higashida Gyōu (東田曉雨). Teng is regarded as the Father of Taiwanese folk songs.

== Biography ==
Teng Yu-hsien was born in Ryūtan, Tōshien Chō (modern-day Longtan, Taoyuan) of Japanese-ruled Taiwan. He migrated to Daitotei (Twatutia) with his family when he was three years old. In 1914, Teng joined Bangka Public School (艋舺公學校). He graduated in 1920, and subsequently entered the Taihoku Normal School (modern-day National Taipei University of Education). In 1925, Teng graduated and became a teacher of the Nishin Public School (日新公學校). After he married Chung You-mei (鍾有妹) in 1926, he departed from his teaching job and went to Japan to study composition theory in the Tokyo Music Academy.

Teng returned to Taiwan in 1930, then served as a translator in Taichū District Court. In 1932, he was invited by Wen-sheng Records (文聲唱片) to compose the March of the Daitotei (大稻埕行進曲), a Japanese popular song which was thought to be lost, until it was rediscovered by a collector in 2007. Later, he was interested in Columbia Records, an early disc company in Taiwan, and was invited by Tan Kun-giok, a songwriter that served as an officer of the Columbia Records. In 1933, Teng composed several well-known Hokkien songs such as Bang Chhun Hong (望春風) and Moon Night Sorrow (月夜愁).

He created a representative work The Torment of a Flower (雨夜花) in 1934, a song that depicts the mood of a fictional pathetic woman. Between 1934 and 1937, Teng composed many other songs include the Moa Bin Chhun Hong (滿面春風) and Song of Four Seasons (四季紅). After Second Sino-Japanese War occurred in 1937, the Japanese government began to reinforce the influence of Japanese culture, and thus suppressed the development of the Taiwanese Hokkien songs. Many of the songs that were composed by Teng were banned, and some were rewritten into Japanese language.

In 1939, the Pacific War intensified, thus Teng resigned from his job and fled to Kyūrin Village of Shinchiku Prefecture (modern-day Qionglin, Hsinchu) with his family, then served as a teacher in the Kyūrin Public School (芎林公學校). His health situation was gradually getting worse at that time, but he still composed some Japanese songs. At that time, Teng adopted two Japanese names: Karasaki Yosame and Higashida Gyōu. On 11 June 1944, he died from lung disease and heart disorder. Asteroid 255989 Dengyushian, discovered by Taiwanese astronomers Chi Sheng Lin and Ye Quan-Zhi in 2006, was named in his honor. The official naming citation was published by the Minor Planet Center on 12 October 2011 (M.P.C. 76677).

== List of composition works ==
Song	Meaning	Songwriter	Year	Note
大稻埕行進曲	March of the Daitotei		1932	
一個紅蛋	A Red Egg	Lee Lim-chhiu	1932	
望春風 / Bāng Chhun-hong	Desire to the Spring Breeze	Lee Lim-chhiu	1933	rewritten as Mother Earth is Calling on You (大地は招く) by Japanese Army
月夜愁 / Go̍at Iā Chhiû	Moon Night Sorrow	Chiu Thiam-ōng	1933	Mandarin Chinese version: 情人再見 rewritten as The Soldier's Wife by Japanese Army
跳舞時代			1933	
橋上美人			1933	
雨夜花 / Ú Iā Hoe	Rainy Night Flower	Chiu Thiam-ōng	1934	rewritten as The Honorable Soldier by Japanese Army
春宵吟		Chiu Thiam-ōng	1934	
青春讚			1934	
單思調		Chiu Thiam-ōng	1934	
閒花嘆		Lee Lim-chhiu	1934	
想要彈像調 (想要彈同調)		Tan Kun-giok	1934	
文明女		Tan Kun-giok	1934	
不滅的情		Chiu Thiam-ōng	1934	
情炎的愛		Tan Kun-giok	1934	
老青春		Lin Ching-yueh (林清月)	1934	
梅前小曲			1934	
琴韻				
碎心花		Chiu Thiam-ōng	1934	
閨女嘆		Chiu Thiam-ōng	1934	
風中煙		Chiu Thiam-ōng	1935	
姊妹心			1938	
對花			1938	
番社姑娘 / 蕃社のむすめ		Kurihara Hakuya (栗原白也)	1938	
寄給哥哥的一封信			1938	
四季紅 / Sù Kùi Hông	Song of Four Seasons	Lee Lim-chhiu	1938	
滿面春風		Chiu Thiam-ōng	1939	
小雨夜戀		Tan Kun-giok	1939	
密林的黃昏		Tan Kun-giok	1939	
純情夜曲			1939	
南風謠			1940	
南國花譜			1940	
送君曲			1940	
不願煞		Lee Lim-chhiu	1941	
昏心鳥				
月昇鼓浪嶼				
菅芒花				
