= The Torment of a Flower =

"雨夜花"

Song
- Language: Taiwanese Hokkien
- English title: Torment of a Flower
- Published: 1934
- Composer: Teng Yu-hsien
- Lyricist: Chiu Thiam-ōng

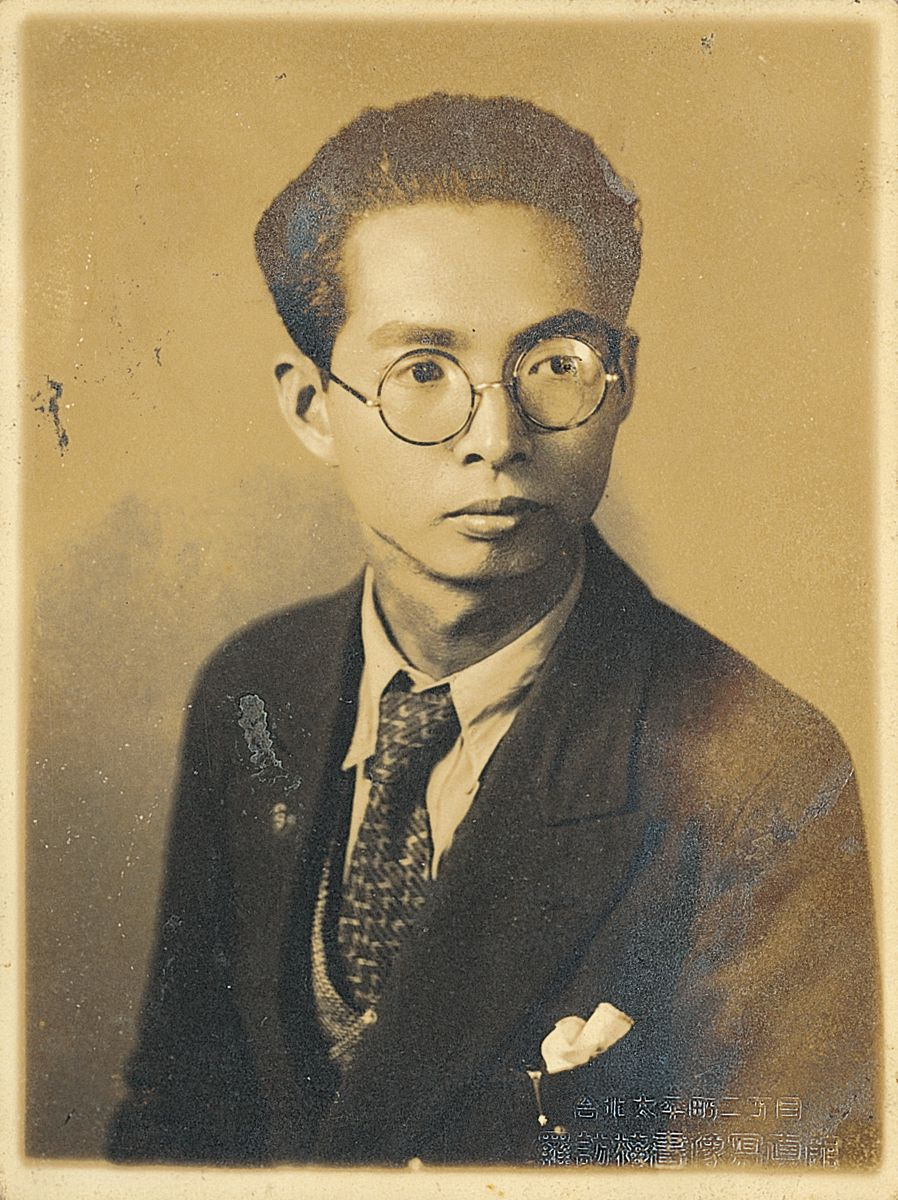
Teng Yu-hsien, the composer

"The Torment of a Flower" (Chinese: 雨夜花; Tâi-lô: Ú-iā-hua; lit. 'a flower at rainy night'), also known as "Rainy Night Flower", is a 1934 Taiwanese Hokkien song composed by Teng Yu-hsien and written by Chiu Thiam-ōng.

== About ==
Taiwanese writer Liau Han-sin (廖漢臣) wrote the lyrics of a children's song "Spring" (春天) and gave it to Teng Yu-hsien, asking him to compose for it. This was the earliest version of "The Torment of a Flower". Although Teng is a Hakka, he usually composed with Taiwanese Hokkien and not Hakka. Some scholars have questioned this story about children's songs.

In 1934, while Chiu Thiam-ōng was working at Columbia Records, he once went to a nightclub and heard a sad story about a girl who worked there. Chiu was touched, and he decided to rewrite the lyrics of "Spring", wrote the story into Teng's music, that is "The Torment of a Flower". It is the first collaborative work between Teng and Chiu. Especially, there was usually three part lyrics in Taiwanese Hokkien songs then, but there are four parts in "The Torment of a Flower".

雨夜花，雨夜花，受風雨吹落地。無人看見，每日怨慼，花謝落塗不再回。

— Chiu Thiam-ōng, The Torment of a Flower

The first part of the lyrics means: "Blossom in a stormy night, pelted to the ground by the rain and wind. All by my lonesome, no one sees my constant grief for the blossom falling into the dirt that has no hope of revival."

During the Second World War, the Japanese Imperial Warlord tampered with the lyrics of the song to declare that the Taiwanese under their rule love Japan. The Japanese version includes the line "How excited the honorable Japanese soldiers who wear red ribbons." (紅色彩帶，榮譽軍伕，多麼興奮，日本男兒。)

The song was played twice on a piano in the 2017 horror game Detention.

== Notable performances ==
- In 2002, Placido Domingo sang this song with Jody Chiang in Taipei Concert Hall.
- The 2010 S.H.E song I Love Rainy Night Flower is a partial Sampling of "The Torment of a Flower".
- Hayley Westenra performed the song at a 2010 concert in Kaohsiung.
- Rainy Night Flower/RNF, a 2011 television drama series produced by Sanlih Television, was inspired by the song. Starring Huang Pin-Yuan, Sun Shu-may, Jessie Chang, Edison Lin, Cocco Wu and Teddy Wang.
- Taiwan Story,a 2020 television chapter drama series produced by Taiwan Television, was inspired by the song. Starring Penny Lin, Anson Hung, Mariko Okubo, Chen Ming-ho, Wu Pong-fong and Cheng Kai-sheng.
- The song is included in the soundtrack of the Netflix series Light the Night. It is sung by Jia Jia.
