= History of dance in Taiwan =

Performing Arts of Taiwan

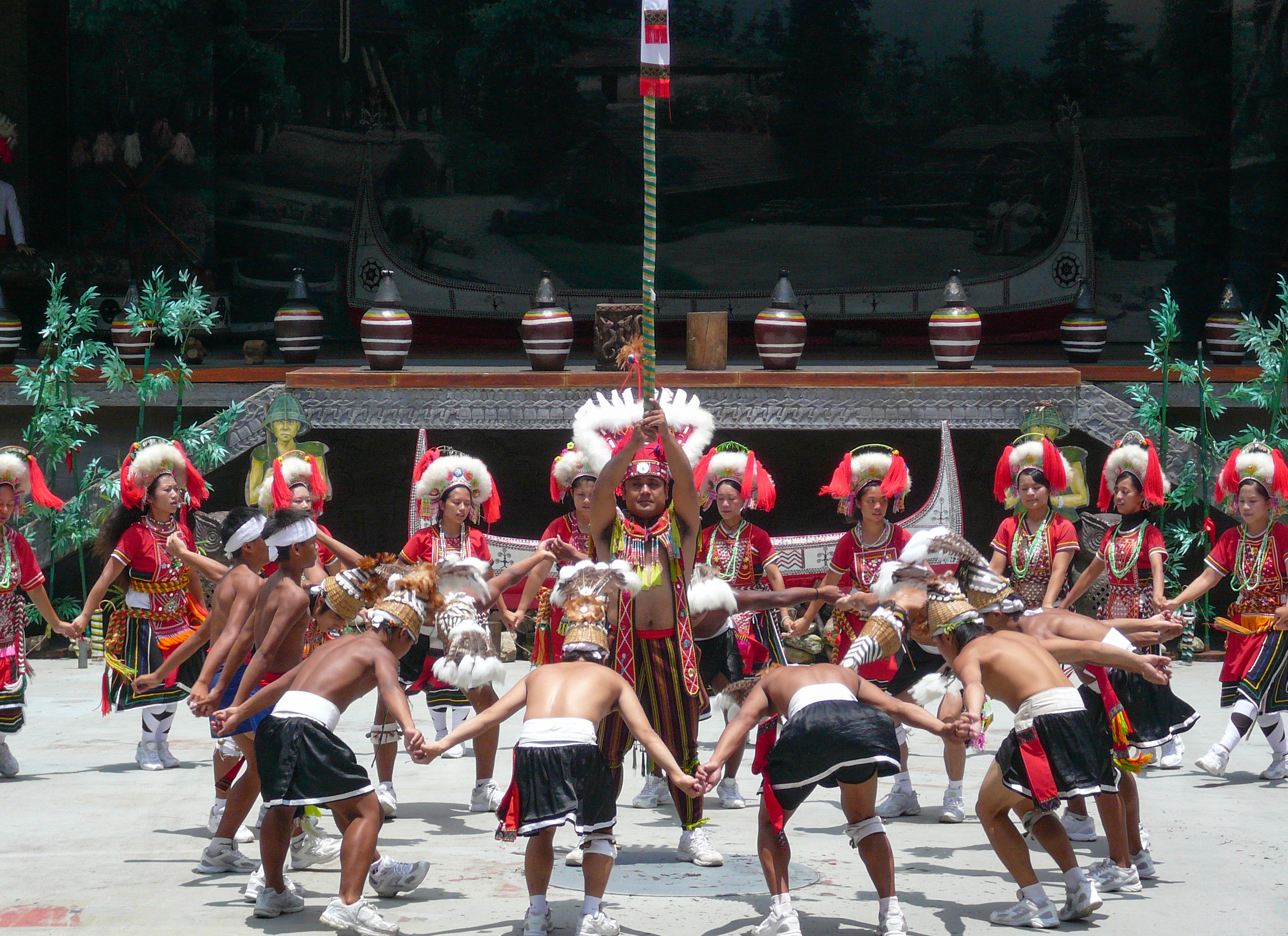
Amis people of Taiwan performing a traditional dance.

Located between China, South Korea, Japan, and several island countries of Southeast Asia, Taiwan is situated at the junction of maritime traffic connecting Indo-Pacific countries. The earliest human activity on the island dated back to the Paleolithic Changbin culture in Taitung County. Taiwan then experienced the Dutch Formosa period (1624–1662), the Kingdom of Tungning (1661–1683), the Japanese rule (1895–1945), and the current period starting with the Nationalist government's move to Taiwan in 1949. With the human body as its primary medium of expression, dance is inextricably linked to the activities of different ethnic groups. Influenced by Taiwan's geographical location and historical background, the establishment and evolution of dance forms are closely connected to the political, economic, social, and cultural factors in every period.

== Indigenous music and dance ==
The cultures and languages of Taiwan's indigenous peoples belong to the Austronesian linguistic family and have a history spanning several centuries in Taiwan. The Council of Indigenous Peoples under the Executive Yuan recognizes 16 ethnic groups, comprising 2.51% of Taiwan's population at about 581,694 people. Other than the Pingpu people, most indigenous tribes have resided in remote environments, maintained an almost closed lifestyle, and had to be self-sufficient, which have allowed them to preserve their languages, cultures, customs, and social structures. The music and dances of each ethnic group are also unique.

Indigenous music and dances most often take the form of group singing and dancing with community participation. They feature repetitive movements and can be categorized into dances for religious rites, social ceremonies, and everyday entertainment based on their motivation and context. Animism is the belief system of many indigenous peoples. Dances for religious rites are primarily performed when a tribe engages in collective rites of intensification. They are usually well-structured, with clear rules and taboos. Examples of such rites include the Pas-ta'ay of the Saisiyat people, the Maljeveq of the Paiwan people, the Milalikis or Misacepo' and Harvest Festival of the Amis people, the Flying Fish Festival of the Tao people, and the Mangayau of the Pinuyumayan people.

Social ceremony dances are singing and dancing that tribespeople perform for certain individuals, events, or objects. These occasions can range from child-birth, reaching adulthood, weddings, completion of new houses, to death. Unlike religious rite dances, the songs and dances performed during social ceremonies are not as strictly regulated. The expressions of the dances will also vary depending on the specific ceremony performed. For instance, the Paiwan people of Chunri Township in Pingtung County have a unique wedding dance, in which the tribespeople offering nuptial felicitations hold hands with the newlyweds and together, they form a half circle to dance a cycle of the same moves accompanied by singing.

Dances for everyday entertainment are those that tribespeople engage in during daily labor and leisure time. These dances follow no set forms and are often more spontaneous. An example of such a dance occurs during the spring farming season, when Pinuyumayan women form mutual-help weeding groups and work together to clear the weeds in the field of each family. When at work, they follow a leader and sing freely while dancing along, with a great deal of improvisation involved.

During the Japanese rule, fieldwork conducted by Japanese scholars produced substantial literature on the music and dances of Taiwan's indigenous peoples. The preservation of these records enabled reconstructions and further studies by later researchers. After the Nationalist government relocated to Taiwan in 1949, dancers from mainland China, including Li Tien-min and Kao Yan, were commissioned to collect specimens of "mountain songs and dance" and to "instill the spirit of the 'new age' into traditional mountain songs and dances." The dancers re-arranged the traditional songs and dances they had collected during their research in 1952. The re-choreographed dances were designated as performances for welcoming guests and for recreational purposes in the military and also taught to young people from different tribes over the course.

With the growing awareness of ethnic identity, the term "mountain song and dance" was rectified and renamed "indigenous music and dance." The performances thus gradually shifted from welcome dances, which aimed at boosting the atmosphere, back to music and dances that embodied the core of indigenous cultures. The Formosa Aboriginal Song and Dance Troupe (FASDT) was founded in May 1991 and consisted of 16 young indigenous individuals, including Faidaw Fagod of the Amis and Snaiyan of the Pinuyumayan. The troupe members conducted field studies within tribes and learned the traditional music and dances from tribal elders, gradually acquiring religious rite dances and traditional music and dances from various indigenous peoples. This allowed FASDT to bring the dances to the halls of theatre arts and help indigenous dances shed their past association with recreation and welcome dances.

As dance professionals of indigenous descent began returning to their hometowns, they began adopting theatrical choreography approaches that merged elements of traditional tribal culture with contemporary dance vocabulary to create distinctive works of dance. For example, the Tjimur Dance Theatre, hailing from the Paiwan tribe in Pingtung County, came under the leadership of Ljuzem Madiljin and Baru Madiljin. Both siblings graduated from tertiary dance institutes and established Tjimur Dance Theatre as the first full-time dance company in Taiwan dedicated to presenting contemporary Paiwan culture. Also of Paiwan descent, former Cloud Gate dancer Puljaljuyan Pakaleva returned to his hometown Taitung in 2015 to establish the Bulareyaung Dance Company. He developed works of novel creative styles by training his dancers to undertake labor work in the mountains and sing chants by the waterside. In 2012, Watan Tusi of Truku founded TAI Body Theatre in Hualien County. Formerly a member of FASDT, Watan compiled instructions on feet movement in music and dance routines across multiple tribes. The "step charts" he created formed the basis for a catalog of movements in dance pieces, allowing for the creation of works that manifest both contemporary and traditional influences to the dance culture.

== Taiwanese Folk Dance ==
At the beginning of the Kingdom of Tungning in 1661, large groups of coastal residents from mainland China's Fujian and Guangdong provinces immigrated to Taiwan. With them they brought the folk culture and beliefs from their hometowns. Religious rites, celebrations, and other temple performances served to bring social stability, worship deities, and entertain the people. Local traditional operas that were popular during this period include Nanguan, Beiguan, Teochew opera, Taiwanese opera, puppetry, shadow puppetry, folk acrobatics, as well as chariot and drum pageantry, plowing pageantry and other operettas. "Art formations," developed by neighborhood watch groups that villagers organized for self-defense, also incorporated local operettas. These traditional operatic elements and art formation activities laid the foundations for Taiwanese folk dances that were developed later on.

After the Nationalist government’s relocation to Taiwan, Taiwanese folk dances began its budding stages of development in the 1950s. President Chiang Kai-shek issued instructions to advocate the national culture and revive Chinese music and dances. In 1952, the Chinese National Dance Propagation Committee (later known as the National Dance Association of R.O.C.) was established on the orders of Chiang Ching-kuo, who was the then Director of General Political Department at Ministry of National Defense. Lieutenant General He Chih-hao was appointed as Minister and founding chairperson of the Board of Directors, tasked with the responsibility of promoting national dance education. In 1954, the committee organized the Taiwan Area Chinese National Dance Competition. Dancers such as Ku Ya-shen, Lee Shu-fen, Tsai Jui-yueh, and Lin Hsiang-yun, who had studied abroad in Japan, accepted invitations to choreograph dance works using elements that manifested the essence of Chinese ethnic culture. Dancers from Mainland China, including Li Tien-min, Kao Tzu, Kao Yan, and Liu Feng-shueh, held teaching positions at schools and studied traditional Chinese dances. They also visited indigenous tribes, either by commission or for personal interest, to learn about indigenous music and dances, which they incorporated into their creative work.

In 1966, the Cultural Revolution erupted, prompting many choreographers and dancers to explore elements of traditional Chinese culture due to the government's promotion of the Chinese Cultural Renaissance Movement. Examples include Tsai Jui-yueh's "Miaonu Nongbei" (Miao maidens dancing with wine cups), Lee Tsai-er's "Wang Zhaojun," and Kao Yan's "Gongdeng Wu" (Palace Lantern Dance). These works, refined over time, eventually became classics in Taiwanese folk dance. During this era, choreographers and dancers drew inspiration from dance traditions in mainland China and Japan, while also incorporating local Taiwanese cultural elements. Gradually, this evolutionary process culminated in the prototype for Taiwanese ethnic dance.

In 1971, the Republic of China (Taiwan, ROC) withdrew from the United Nations. Realizing the importance of pragmatic diplomacy, Minister of Education Chiang Yen-shih created the Youth Goodwill Missions of the Republic of China (Youth Groups). These groups consisted of students selected from colleges and universities throughout Taiwan to serve as cultural ambassadors, traveling to different countries around the world. They put on performances that showcased highlights of the Chinese culture, such as martial arts, Beijing opera, and folk dances. Li Tien-min, Lin Hwai-min, Hsu Huei-mei, Tsai Li-hua, Li Ying-hsiu, Wang Yu-ying, and Lai Shiu-feng had all served as program directors for these performances.

Diplomatic relations between the United States and ROC were severed on January 1, 1979. Taiwan's claim as the rightful inheritor of traditional Chinese culture was called into question in the wake of this series of diplomatic setbacks, leading to a search for Taiwan's subjectivity. Chen Chi-lu, the first Minister of the Council for Cultural Affairs, planned to establish a performance theater in 1988 that would "present the subjectivity of traditional Taiwanese culture." Tsai Li-hua accepted a commission by the China Youth Corps to produce 100 "Folk Night" sessions annually, and subsequently founded the Taipei Folk Dance Theatre. Drawing inspiration and material from folk art formations learned through field research on local Taiwanese temple fairs, Tsai composed dance works that successfully took stages internationally.

== Dance in Taiwanese Theatre ==
The developments of Taiwanese theatre dances can be traced back to the Japanese rule period. While under the colonial rule, Taiwan was also exposed to the impacts of diversified dance trends faced in Japan. Pioneers of Japanese modern dance, Baku Ishii and Seiko Takada led a delegation to Taiwan in 1930. In July 1936, the dance company of Korean dancer Choi Seung-hee, Ishii's protégée, also visited Taiwan on a tour. Their works were modern while unique, free in form and incorporating elements of local culture. Important dancers who studied dance in Japan at the time included Lin Ming-te, Hsu Ching-hao, Lin Hsiang-yun, Tsai Jui-yueh, Lee Tsai-er, Lee Shu-fen, and Ku Ya-shen. After coming back to Taiwan, these dancers had all begun holding classes and offering lessons. The types of dances they taught were varied, including ballet, modern dance, mountain song and dance (indigenous music and dances), Hakka dance, Chinese classical dance, and recreational dances. The dance societies they established provided plentiful and solid dance training, and through government sponsored competitions and performances, laid the foundation for the extraordinary skills of Taiwanese dancers.

Since the start of World War II, the ROC government had been accepting long-term economic aid from the United States. In 1967, the US Department of State supported the Paul Taylor Dance Company to visit Taiwan for performance, which received enthusiastic response. Tsai Jui-yueh's China Dance Club had invited US-based modern dancer Al Huang Chung-liang to Taiwan. The club then invited American modern dancer Eleanor King to teach Doris Humphrey’s movement system. Taiwanese dancers Henry Yu, Lin Hwai-min, Tsuai Yung-yung, H.T. Chen, Lei Ta-peng, Lin Ssu-tuan, and Lin Lee-chen had all attended some of these workshops to learn the system.

Wong Yen-lu, who was acclaimed as the Chinese version of Martha Graham, came to Taiwan for personal travel in 1967. With the planning and organization of traditional opera scholar Yu Ta-kang, Wong offered dance workshops and held a "Modern Dance Show" during her stay. She also created the new dance piece Madam White Snake, which featured H.T. Chen, Lu Chih-ming, Lin Hwai-min, Hsu Tsang-houei, and Shih Wei-liang. Nie Kuang-yan was in charge of the lighting. This was not only Taiwan's first "modern dance" performance, but also marked the earliest importation of Martha Graham's modern dance techniques to Taiwan.

During the martial law period, modern dance was marginalized in Taiwan. Europe and America were looked to as a world where dance could be pursued freely. Tina Yuan Lems, Lin Hwai-min, Tsuai Yung-yung, and H. T. Chen went to the United States for further studies, while Henry Yu studied in Spain. Tina Yuan Lems later became principal dancer with the Alvin Ailey American Dance Theater, and Henry Yu became the first ethnic-Chinese dancer to join the Martha Graham Dance Company.

The ROC withdrew from the United Nations in 1971. In 1973, Lin Hwai-min founded the Cloud Gate Dance Theatre of Taiwan based on the motto "Composed by Chinese, choreographed by Chinese, danced by Chinese, for a Chinese audience." On December 16, 1978, the premiere day of Cloud Gate’s new piece Legacy, the United States announced the severance of diplomatic ties with ROC. Dr. Liu Feng-shueh founded the Neo-Classic Dance Company in 1976. Liu has devoted her life’s work to reconstructing Tang dynasty music and dances, reviving and re-creating indigenous music and dances, and choreographing pieces of modern dance and modern Chinese dance. Works of Taiwanese dance companies in this period primarily featured classic Chinese materials with incorporations of the Western modern dance vocabulary. Works from this time include Tale of the White Serpent (1975) by Cloud Gate Dance Theatre of Taiwan, the Neo-Classic Dance Company’s A Fisherman’s Song (1976), Henry Yu Dance Company’s Yu Xuanji (1985), etc.

Taiwan went through a gradual relaxation and eventual lifting of martial law in the late 1980s. Bans against media publication and forming political parties were rescinded, and labor, student, women’s, and other social movements grew and spread rapidly. The resulting environment opened up possibilities for multifarious expressions of dance. In October 1994, when constructions for the Taipei Metro Operations Control Center were about to break ground, dancer Tsai Jui-yueh’s China Dance Club was facing demolition because it had leased land allocated for the project. In response, several arts and culture groups gathered there to petition for the preservation of the dance club, participating in a 24-hour marathon-style arts carnival: "1994 Taipei Arts Movement—from this Dusk to the Next." There was also a performance art presentation titled My Home is in the Air, in which dancers were suspended at a 15-story height during a typhoon.

Before the term "curation" became fashionable in dance circles, Ping Heng founded the Crown Art Center Theater in December 1984 and began organizing the Crown Arts (Mini) Festival focusing on interdisciplinary performances. She also coordinated the Little Asia Dance Exchange Network, an international collaborative effort between Hong Kong, Tokyo, Melbourne, and Taiwan which established a platform for facilitating exchanges of dance and theater. With the establishment of Dance Forum Taipei in 1989, interdisciplinary efforts and diversity of form increased in creative works. Taiwanese dance companies at this time gave brilliant performances internationally, for example, the Taipei Dance Circle with Olympics (1995), Legend Lin Dance Theatre with Moroirs de Vie (1995), and Tai Gu Tales Dance Theatre with The Life of Mandela (1988).

Since the turn of the millennium, subject matters and elements available for dance in Taiwanese theatre had grown even more diverse. There are now dance companies that devote attention to ecological and environmental protection, that aim to advance contemporary circus developments, and that incorporate street dance, tap dance, jazz dance, or Flamenco, as well as troupes that concentrate on topics related to Taiwanese local awareness. Some of these dance companies included Dancecology, Les Petites Choses Production, Fevervine Dance Theatre, Formosa Circus Art (FOCA), and Bare Feet Dance Theatre.

And alliances between technological arts and dance have given rise to infinite possibilities. In 2001, Not a Love Story combined audiovisual animation and dancers’ movements to create a multimedia music theatre work that could be considered the first large-scale, technological performing arts production in Taiwan. The work was directed by Chen Yao, who had worked in Hollywood for years specializing in special effects, and was co-produced by Image in Motion Theater Company, Ku & Dancers, and Dance Forum Taipei. Following the proposal of "Challenge 2008: National Development Plan (2002-2007)," the government and private sectors together facilitated the Digital Art Performance Awards, first organized by the Digital Art Foundation in 2010. In the same year, the Quanta Arts Foundation located in Taoyuan also launched the Quanta Tech Art & Performance Festival, committing efforts to fostering interdisciplinary talents in technological performing arts. Su Wen-chi and YiLab., Huang Yi and Huang Yi Studio+, as well as Hsieh Chieh-hua and Anarchy Dance Theatre have all achieved considerable success in this field.
