= Performing arts in Taiwan =

Performing arts of Taiwan

In Taiwan, the performing arts are typically classified into the broad categories of music, dance, drama, and traditional opera, with further subdivisions within each category. For instance, traditional opera includes Taiwanese opera, Peking opera, glove puppetry, Beiguan opera, Hakka grand opera, and others, while dance includes folk dance, modern dance, and indigenous dance. Some genres are difficult to categorize, such as circus acts, immersive experiences, and magic, and some are classified as "integrated art" or included in one of the above listed categories.

Due to the specificities of its geographic location and temporal spatial contexts, Taiwan has experienced various regimes and has different ethnic groups and races, resulting in a variety of cultural systems and sources, which have integrated, resisted, converged, or competed with each other and have all continued to transform and evolve through time, civilizations, and development.

== From the Kingdom of Tungning to Qing Dynasty ==
To a certain degree, the performing arts originate in rites and rituals. For instance, indigenous dances include festival dance, social rites dance, and recreational dance. Early records of Taiwanese performing arts include dances performed at indigenous festivals, including the Pasta'ay and the Maleveq festivals of the Paiwan, the Amis Milalikis or Misacepo' and Harvest festival, the Flying fish festival of the Tao, and the Mangayau festival of the Puyuma, etc.

The folk beliefs of the Han people arrived when residents along the coastal regions of Fujian and Guangdong came to Taiwan during the Kingdom of Tungning period between 1661 and 1683. Popular regional performances during this time included Nanguan, Beiguan, Teochew opera, Taiwanese opera, glove puppetry, marionette puppetry, shadow puppetry, as well as song and dance performance activities such as chariot and drum pageantry, plowing pageantry, and others. These theatrical and musical elements and activities not only provided spiritual comfort but also became a breeding ground for traditional Taiwanese drama. From the dominance of the Nanguan opera in the early Qing dynasty to the popularity of Beiguan opera in the late Qing, family troupes, professional theatrical troupes, and apprentice associations began to form, which laid a foundation for the development of Taiwanese folk dance. Nanguan and Beiguan music were the predominant musical form during this period.

Taiwan's performing arts during this time still tended toward folk beliefs and ceremonial rites, or as recreation during agricultural slack seasons. Commercial and professional performances had not yet been developed. Performing arts as we know it rose to prominence only with the rise of theaters after urbanization and the involvement of industry professionals, who elevated performances to the level of artistry, and such development did not occur until the Japanese colonial period. This was preceded by the development of Taiwan's fine arts and music in the 17th century, when the island was ruled by the Spanish in the north and the Dutch in the south, accompanied by the arrival of missionaries, who established churches to proselytize and introduced Western church music to Taiwan. With the successive defeats suffered by the Qing Dynasty, European traders arrived in troves after the mid-19th century, setting up chambers of commerce and branch offices in Taiwan and bringing Western culture with them. With the increasing number of missionaries, Western art and music was also imparted through the church system.

== Japanese colonial period ==
Subsequent to the First Sino-Japanese War in 1894, the defeated Qing dynasty signed the Treaty of Shimonoseki, ceding Taiwan to Japanese rule beginning in 1895. Western music education systems were introduced to Taiwan along with Japanese rule. At the time, "music" was a core subject officially rooted in the Taiwanese education curriculum, and was a compulsory subject in the teacher training system. It became an important part of the system that cultivated Taiwanese composers. In addition to learning from the education curriculum, dancers as well as musicians departed for Japan to pursue further studies.

Prior to the outbreak of the Sino-Japanese War, the professional Beiguan theatrical troupes were active throughout Taiwan. The popularity of Peking opera in Taiwan influenced the development of various theatrical genres, such as Beiguan opera and Siping opera. Taiwanese opera began to develop from the Yilan region to become the only theatrical genre that originated in Taiwan. Other theatrical genres such as the Hakka tea-picking opera and glove puppetry also proliferated, while the number of glove puppetry troupes had remained the highest among all theatrical genres since the Japanese colonial period.

At the same time, Taiwan's modern drama began to germinate. In contrast to performing through songs in traditional operas, these were called "New Drama" and were set in a contemporary social environment, where performers wore modern clothing and spoke the vernacular against a modern set design, which diverged entirely from the traditional opera. The rise and fall of the development of "New Drama" in Taiwan's theatrical history were influenced by factors in the "political environment." For instance, the Taiwanese Cultural Association was established in 1921 by Lin Hsien-tang, Chiang Wei-shui, Tsai Pei-huo, Wang Ming-chuan and others in the hope to change ideological concepts in the society and culture at the time as well as to reform unpleasant social customs and elevate the cultural standards of the general public through theater, which was therefore referred to as "Cultural Drama."

In the field of dance, performances by the pioneer of Japanese modern dance Baku Ishii and Korean dancer Choi Seung-hee in Taiwan in 1930 catalyzed a trend among early Taiwanese dancers, represented by Tsai Jui-yueh, Lee Tsai-er, Lee Shu-fen, to study in Japan. Upon ruling Taiwan, the Japanese government worked to put an end to practices such as foot binding, striving to make strides toward modernization. The visit to Taiwan by modern dancers was of symbolic historical significance. Japan also provided a conduit for the introduction into Taiwan of ballet—the epitome of Western culture.

Under the Kominka (Japanization) Movement implemented during the late Japanese colonial period, most traditional operas were banned or forced to take on different performance formats. As a result, a profusion of professional theatrical troupes sprang up in an attempt to replace the gaps in the market after the ban on traditional opera. However, the initial fervor in the development of New Drama was limited by conditions of social development and political factors, and faced scrutiny and suppression from the Japanese authorities as well as the Nationalist government that followed. Even Lu Chuan-sheng's Castrated Chicken, a Taiwanese opera created through Western composition techniques, came under the scrutiny of the ruling powers. Ultimately, the major creative forces of New Drama could only rely on amateur performances. Without more profound artistic achievements and lacking in entertainment value, these works gradually fell out of the mainstream.

== From post-war to the martial law period ==
In the early post-war period, professional theater troupes of various regional theatrical genres from China arrived in Taiwan, which were more or less connected with the government or the military. Examples included Yu opera, Qinqiang, Peking opera, Sichuan opera, Yue opera, etc. In terms of dance, the authorities did not place limitations on the style or content of dance performances between 1945 and 1950. Whether they're Japanese creative dance, Western ballet, Christian cultural themes, or exotic dances drawn from various cultures around the world, the first generation of Taiwanese dancers were free to create and teach.。

However, after the 228 incident erupted in 1947, the Taiwan Provincial Chief Administrative Executive Office promulgated the Regulations on the Management of Theatrical Troupes in the Taiwan Province, requiring all performances and activities to apply for registration in advance and strengthening control over theatrical activities and speech. In 1949, the Nationalist government comprehensively retreated to Taiwan and immediately promulgated the martial law. Subsequent to the repressive rule of the Kominka Movement, the martial law further exerted pressures and centralized power over the thoughts, actions and personal freedoms of the Taiwanese people, while suppressed the freedoms of performing arts activities at the same time.

For example, the establishment of the Chinese Literature and Arts Awards Committee in 1950 provided a sizable monetary award for the creation of literary and artistic works with a "national cultural consciousness" and "highlighting anticommunist and anti-Russian significance." The subsequently founding of the Chinese Writers' and Artists' Association, which incorporated a group of theater workers, along with theatrical troupes established by the military and academic institutions brought anticommunist and anti-Russian works to an apex in theater as well as in dance. Dance was regarded as a tool for reviving national culture and for uniting the collective consciousness of the people. The "created tradition" of "folk dance movement" was born within this temporal context.

In regards to traditional theater, Taiwanese opera was popularly received in commercial theaters during the Japanese colonial period and reached a further peak in the post-war 1960s. It was incorporated into broadcast, film, and television media along with transformations in mass media. Glove puppetry progressed along a similar route. Anti-communist and anti-Russian literature and art placed similar restraints and restrictions on traditional theater, with the exception of Peking opera. Though popularly received in Taiwan prior to the arrival of the Nationalist government, Peking opera was nurtured in the military and enjoyed a developmental ecology that differed from other theatrical arts. The mechanisms for cultivating talents of Peking opera included formal education in the school system as well as schools affiliated with theater troupes, and thus private and public theatrical schools emerged in consequence. These schools did not only nurture operatic talents but many circus and acrobatic talents as well. In terms of music, there were a number of educational systems established respectively by musicians from mainland China as well as by Taiwanese musicians who have studied in Japan.

The introduction of modern dance in the 1960s played a pivotal role in the Cold War era. The Western cultural trends, the mainstay in modernist ideologies and aesthetics at that time, had a profound influence in Taiwan and opened up international perspectives during the martial law era. The diplomatic setbacks of the 1970s, including the withdrawal from the United Nations and severance of the diplomatic ties between the ROC and the United States, made Taiwanese people turn to culture and begin to seek for their own identity and national legitimacy. The Cloud Gate Dance Theater was established at this time.

== After the lifting of martial law ==
The first phase of Taiwan's Little Theater Movement basically began to germinate in the 1960s, prior to the lifting of martial law, with Li Man-kuei, who was devoted to promoting theatrical performances and organizing events such as world theater festivals and youth theater festivals. Performance activities targeted students on campus. Although Li had a strong political backing and served as a member of the play script review committee of the Chinese Literature and Arts Awards Committee, she actively promoted theatrical performances for children, students in universities, women, and religious groups in hopes that drama could play a role in social education. At the same time, magazines introducing Western art, film, drama, and creative theories also created new connections between Taiwan and Western culture in the context towards the lifting of martial law.

In 1980, Yao Yi-wei, then chairman of the Stage Play Appreciation Committee, launched the first Experimental Theatre Festival, presenting new styles that diverged from traditional dramatic forms and opened up a dialogue between traditional and modern dramas and enabled more people to see new possibilities. This greatly influenced the later development of modern drama and is regarded as a major milestone in the development of Taiwan's modern drama. As a result, Lanling Theatre, which performed in the inaugural Experimental Theatre Festival, officially launched the wave of Taiwan's Little Theater movement full of avant-garde and experimental character. It ushered in an era that gradually made strides toward the lifting of martial law and welcomed various stages of the Little Theater movement as well as more drastic social, artistic, and cultural changes.

Around the time when martial law was lifted, Taiwan experienced an accelerating disparity between the rich and the poor brought by rapid industrialization. In addition to responding to social issues through various experimental styles of drama, dance provided a response to contemporaneity through the narrative methods of post-modern dance. Masters, authorities, and celebrity dancers are no longer held on a pedestal. Instead, with the bold use of daily life as the subject of dance, the core of post-modern dance lies in breaking the boundaries between life and art and challenging the hierarchies of dance. To a certain degree, it had a mutual resonance with the Little Theater movement of that era.

At the same time, various genres of performing arts transcended their existing frameworks. "Transcultural" and "transdisciplinary" became mainstreams for certain types of creation and discourse. In addition to searching for artistry, they also explored potential for commercial entertainment. As creative content moves toward freedom and diversity, the division of labor within the theater has gradually become comprehensive through professional training and international cooperation, including stage, lighting, music, and sound effects designs, etc. Dramaturgy, theater consultants, creative partners, and various creative and production platforms that have been adopted in recent years have opened up more possibilities for the creative environment of Taiwan's performing arts.

== See also ==
- Taiwanese drama
- Theater in Taiwan
- Music of Taiwan
- Taiwanese opera
- History of dance in Taiwan
