= Nine Songs (contemporary dance) =

Dance-piece by the Cloud Gate Dance Theater

Nine Songs is a dance-piece by the Cloud Gate Dance Theater. The dance premiered at the National Theater and Concert Hall, Taipei in Taiwan on August 10, 1993., marking the first dance-piece after the group's reunion in 1991. The piece consist of eight sections, lasting two hours: “God greeting”, “Chinese Apollo” (premiered as 'East Emperor Taiyi'), “Commander”, “Lady Hsiang”, “The God of Cloud”, “Mountain Ghost”, “Worship Song to the State” and “Send Divine Song”. The dance is based on Nine Songs in Chu Ci by Qu Yuan, a Chinese poet/politician during Warring States period. The three main themes for the piece are: love, nation & people.

The music for the dance first originated from various parts of Asia, including: Taiwan, Tibetan monks, Japan as well as South-East Asian aboriginal songs, from India and Java.

The set for the dance was created by Ming Jue Lee, the Professor of Stage Design at Yale University. The lily-pond oil painting, that serves as the backdrop for the performance, draws inspiration from Lin Hwai-min. The depiction of this natural element, is meant to form a bond between modern clothing & folk costume. “Send Divine Song”, the last segment of the dance, features the use of eight-hundred candles, being lit to eventually reveal the shape of a creek. The set was awarded the New York Dance and Performance Award (FKA; Bessie Awards) in 1996.

== Designers ==
Choreographer: Hwai-min Lin

Stage Design: Ming-Jue Lee

Stage Supervisor: Meng-Chua Wang-

Stage set: Painter YuShan Lin (Lily pound)

Calligraphy: Yang Tse Dong, Calligrapher

Dance Soundtrack: Aborigine's Song from Tribe Zho, Asian Folk Music, and Ju Percussion Group

Music Advisor: Hsiao-Song Choo

Lighting Designer: Ke-Hwa Lee

Magic Lantern: Huei-Wen Chang

Costume Design: Huai-min Lin, Rue-Chi Luo

Mask Design: Shu-Feng Lin, Yao-Jun Wang
