= Lo Man-fei =

Taiwanese dancer and choreographer (1955–2006)

- 羅曼菲
- Born: 16 September 1955; Taipei, Taiwan
- Died: 24 March 2006 (aged 50); Beitou, Taipei, Taiwan
- Education: National Taiwan University (BA); New York University (MFA)
- Occupations: Dancer, choreographer
- Employer: Cloud Gate Dance Theater

Lo Man-fei (Chinese: 羅曼菲; pinyin: Luó Mànfēi; 16 September 1955 – 24 March 2006) was a Taiwanese dancer and choreographer. She was a member of the Cloud Gate Dance Theater, founded by Lin Hwai-min, between 1979 and 1994. Lin subsequently founded her own dance troupe, Taipei Crossover Dance Company, and led Cloud Gate 2 from 1999 to her death.

== Early life and education ==
Lo was born in Taipei, though she and her family moved to Yilan three months after her birth. She had three older sisters, one of which is the singer, Sophie Lo, and one older brother. Lo, who began taking private dance lessons at age 5, joined Taiwan's Neo-Classic Dance Company in 1974 while a student at National Taiwan University. After she graduated from NTU with a degree in English literature, Lo spent a year in New York intending to further her studies in journalism and creative writing. Instead, she returned to Taiwan to join the Cloud Gate Dance Theater in 1979, becoming the lead dancer in White Serpent Tale, Cloud Gate's dance adaption of the Legend of the White Snake, the next year before leaving in 1982 for New York University, where she earned an MFA in dance. While in the United States, Lo appeared in multiple performances of The King and I with Yul Brynner and also studied at the Alvin Ailey School of American Dance, Martha Graham School of Contemporary Dance, and the José Limón Dance School.

== Career ==
She graduated from NYU in 1985, and began teaching at Taipei National University of the Arts that year. Lo was named dance department chair in 1992, and later led the graduate dance program at TNUA. She was responsible for launching the school's seven-year accelerated dance program, which develops talent in high school and places candidates into TNUA upon high school graduation. In 1994, she retired from performing with Cloud Gate and started the Taipei Crossover Dance Company with three other Cloud Gate dancers. Her first choreographic works were completed in the 1980s. This was followed by more work throughout the 1990s, including, The Place Where the Heart Is, City of the Sky, Chronicle of a Floating City, and Dark Side of the Moon. Lo wrote Restless Souls in 1999. That same year, she and Cloud Gate founder Lin Hwai-min started Cloud Gate 2, and Lo was named its first director. She also was awarded the prize for literature and arts from the Wu San-lien Awards Foundation. In 2000, the year she wrote The Snake, Lo was honored by the National Culture and Arts Foundation, which named her the recipient of its National Award for the Arts.

As a performer, Lo was best known as the lead dancer for Lin's Requiem, which featured Lo spinning in place for eleven minutes. In contrast to Lin's East meets West choreographic style, Lo was influenced by Chinese dances and experiences within her personal life.

== Later life and legacy ==
Lo was diagnosed with lung cancer in September 2001. With treatment, the disease stayed manageable until October 2005. Another round of chemotherapy was started at that time, and she was in remission until February 2006. Lo died at the Koo Foundation Sun Yat-sen Cancer Center in Taipei at age 50 in March 2006. Her final work, Pursuing the Dream, a collaboration between herself and Sophie, was performed by members of Cloud Gate 2 seven weeks after Lo's death.

Taipei National University of the Arts has named a scholarship in her honor, as has Cloud Gate. A biographical documentary film, Man Fei, premiered in 2017. On the thirteenth anniversary of her death, the Yilan City Government dedicated 24 March 2019 to Lo. On Lo's 66th birthday, 16 September 2021, a Google Doodle honoring her was posted to the Google Search homepage in Taiwan.
