= Kim Baek-bong =

South Korean dancer (1927–2023)

- Born: Kim Choong-sil; February 12, 1927; Pyongyang, South Pyongan Province, North Korea
- Died: May 11, 2023 (aged 96); Seoul, South Korea
- Other names: Root of Modern Korean Dance; Renaissance of Korean traditional Dance
- Education: Choi Seung-hee Dance Institute
- Occupations: Choregraphyer, Dancer
- Years active: 1943–2023
- Spouse: Ahn Je-seung (m. 1944; died 1998)
- Children: 3
- Relatives: Choi Seung-hee (sister-in-law); An Seong-hee (niece)

Kim Baek-bong (Korean: 김백봉; February 12, 1927 – April 11, 2023), born Kim Choong-sil (김충실), was a foundational South Korean choreographer, dancer, and academic. Widely celebrated as a pioneer of neoclassical Korean dance, she is frequently referred to within Korean cultural history as the "Root of Modern Korean Dance".

Kim spent her multi-decade career modernizing ancient movement forms, successfully merging traditional Korean dance with modern stage aesthetics. She is globally recognized for creating Buchaechum (the Korean Fan Dance) and Hwagwanmu (the Floral Coronet Dance), both of which became iconic symbols of Korean traditional culture. Over her lifetime, she choreographed more than 600 pieces and established institutional frameworks that embedded traditional dance into South Korea's higher education system.

== Early life and education ==
Kim was born on February 12, 1927, in Pyongyang, South Pyongan Province, during the Japanese colonial period. She began her formal dance training in 1943 at the Tokyo institute of Choi Seung-hee, who is widely regarded as the legendary pioneer of modern Korean dance. Kim quickly excelled, becoming Choi's premier disciple.

During the mid-1940s, Kim toured extensively across Japan, China, and Southeast Asia as a primary member of the Choi Seung-hee Dance Troupe. These tours were highly influential in shaping Kim's neoclassical philosophy. By observing Choi's innovative blend of Western modern dance techniques with traditional Asian aesthetics, Kim developed her own vision for updating historical Korean court and folk styles for modern proscenium theaters.

== Career ==
=== Post-War Activity in Pyongyang ===
Following the liberation of Korea, Kim worked in the northern region. She served as both the principal dancer and deputy director of the reorganized Choi Seung-hee Dance Troupe in Pyongyang. Reflecting on this era in later interviews, she noted the stark infrastructural contrasts between the two regions, recalling her surprise at seeing advanced modern installations, such as multiple telephones in northern government offices, which were uncommon in the South at the time.

=== Defection to South Korea ===
Following the division of Korea, Kim worked in Pyongyang before defecting to the South during the Korean War, establishing the Kim Baek-bong Dance Research Institute in Seoul in 1953. In 1954, she presented her most famous work, the Buchaechum (Fan Dance), which was later adapted into a group performance that gained international acclaim at events such as the 1968 Mexico City Olympics, Expo '70, and the 1972 Munich Olympics.

=== Defection and Academic Foundations in South Korea ===
Amid the disruptions of the Korean War, Kim and her family defected to South Korea. Settling in Seoul, she established the Kim Baek-bong Dance Research Institute in 1953, followed by the Korean Art Dance Institute in 1954, to formalize dance training.

=== Academic and Institutional Roles ===
In 1965, Kim joined the faculty of Kyung Hee University. She served as a professor in the Department of Dance until 1992, creating a rigorous curriculum that elevated traditional dance from a folk practice into an accredited academic discipline.

Kim expanded her institutional reach by serving as the 5th director of the prestigious municipal company. In recognition of her cultural contributions, she was elected a permanent member of the National Academy of Arts of the Republic of Korea. In 1995, she established the Kim Baek-bong Dance Preservation Society to formally preserve, catalog, and pass down her choreography.

=== Choreographic works ===
Kim choreographed over 600 distinct works throughout her career, shifting effortlessly between scale, theme, and traditional instrumentation. First presented as a solo piece in 1954, Kim later re-choreographed it into an expansive group ensemble. The work gained massive international recognition when it was performed at the 1968 Mexico City Olympics, Expo '70 in Osaka, and the 1972 Munich Olympics.

It was officially designated an Intangible Cultural Heritage in 2014. Her other widely performed creations include Janggochum (Hourglass Drum Dance), Simcheong (based on the traditional folk tale), Altar of Frenzy, and Mandala.

== Personal life ==
In 1944, Kim married Ahn Je-seung (1928–1998). The marriage deeply connected her to her artistic lineage, as Ahn was the younger brother-in-law of her mentor, Choi Seung-hee.

The couple had three children: a son, Ahn Byeong-cheol, and two daughters, Ahn Byeong-ju and Ahn Na-kyung. Ahn Byeong-ju eventually followed her mother's academic path, later becoming the head of the Department of Dance at Kyung Hee University and the artistic director of her mother's preservation projects.

== Death ==
Kim Baek-bong died on the afternoon of April 11, 2023, at the age of 97. Her funeral was held at the Shinchon Severance Hospital funeral hall in Seoul, with the funeral procession taking place on April 14, 2023. She is survived by her children: son An Byeong-cheol, and daughters An Byeong-ju and An Na-kyung.

== Awards ==
- In 1953, she got the Seoul City Cultural Award for her early recognition of her artistic talent.
- In 1981, she was honored with the Bogwan Cultural Medal for her significant cultural contributions.
- In 1988, she received the Presidential Award for her role in the 1988 Seoul Olympics ceremonies.
- In 1999, she was selected for this specific honorary distinction to recognize her profound impact on modern Korean history.
- In 2005, she got the Eun-gwan Cultural Medals.
- In 2014, she was considered an Intangible Cultural Property and her Buchaechum was designated as the No. 3 asset of South Pyongan Province.
- In 2016, she was honored with the Best Master Award and she was honored as a "Best Master Honoring Korea".
- In 2017 at March 1, she received the Cultural Award for her lifelong dedication to the arts.

== Legacy ==
Kim Baek-bong's legacy continues through the Kim Baek-bong Dance Preservation Society. In 2018, the society gained international attention when they presented a commemorative plaque to Jimin of BTS for his performance that modernized and globally promoted the fan dance. hroughout her career in South Korea, Kim kept Choi's memory alive by recreating her mentor's famous works, such as the Bodhisattva Dance.

In September 2026, the National Gugak Center in Seoul hosted a major retrospective performance titled "Kim Baek-bong, Achieving a Renaissance of New Dance". Organized by the Kim Baek-bong Dance Preservation Society, the festival marked the 100th anniversary of her birth and featured contemporary restagings of six of her defining masterpieces, solidifying her place as a foundational figure in contemporary Korean performance art.

== Bibliography ==
In June 2025, a definitive biographical account of her life was published by Deepnet, titled The Story of Dancer Kim Baek-bong: Even the Spring Sunshine Dances, Even the Haze Dances (무용가 김백봉 이야기 – 봄 햇살도 춤추고 아지랑이도 춤추고). The book was authored by her second daughter, Ahn Na-kyung, who observed Kim's evolution firsthand as her daughter, student, and fellow Korean dance contemporary.
