= Tsai Jui-yueh =

Taiwanese dancer and choreographer

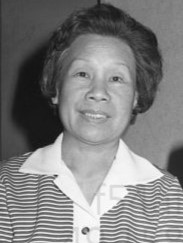
- Born: 8 February 1921; Tainan, Japanese Taiwan
- Died: 29 May 2005 (aged 84); Brisbane, Australia
- Education: National Tainan Girls' Senior High School
- Spouse: Lei Shih-yu (m. 1947–1949)
- Children: Lei Ta-peng

Chinese name
- Traditional Chinese: 蔡瑞月
- Simplified Chinese: 蔡瑞月
Transcriptions
Standard Mandarin
- Hanyu Pinyin: Cài Ruìyuè
- Bopomofo: ㄘㄞ ㄖㄨㄟˋ ㄩㄝˋ
- Wade–Giles: Ts'ai4 Jui4-yue4
Southern Min
- Hokkien POJ: Chhoà Sūi-goa̍t

Tsai Jui-yueh (8 February 1921 – 29 May 2005) was a Taiwanese dancer and choreographer regarded as the mother of modern dance in Taiwan.

== Life and career ==
Born in Tainan on 8 February 1921 to a family of innkeepers, Tsai enrolled at the institution that became the National Tainan Girls' Senior High School, then made her way to Japan in 1937 to study dance under Baku Ishii and Midori Ishii. Prior to leaving Taiwan, Tsai's experience with dancing included aerobic dance class in elementary school and watching Japanese groups in high school. She had heard a Japanese person refer to Taiwan as a "barren desert for dance" and sought to return in order to promote the art of dance in Taiwan, declining a personal dance recital in Tokyo arranged by Midori Ishii. Tsai returned to Taiwan in 1946, and grew in popularity during this period, in part because she accepted every offer to perform.

She married the Indonesian-Chinese poet Lei Shih-yu, who taught at National Taiwan University, in 1947. Lei was imprisoned by Kuomintang authorities in June 1949 and later deported to Guangdong. After Lei's deportation, Tsai was prevented from traveling to see him in Hong Kong. Tsai was sent to Green Island shortly thereafter and released three years later, but continued to be barred from leaving Taiwan.

In 1953, she founded her own school of dance at the China Dance Club, later known as the Tsai Jui-yueh Dance Research Institute. Tsai's travel restrictions were lifted in 1983, and she moved to Australia to live and work with her son, Lei Ta-peng, a dancer who was a student of Elizabeth Dalman. Tsai's studio was left to daughter-in-law Ondine Hsiao and Hsiao's sister Grace. The building was to be demolished in 1994, but plans were called off after three dancers protested by suspending themselves in the air via crane for 24 hours. The Taipei City government named Tsai's studio a municipal heritage site in October 1999. Four days later, the building burned in a suspected arson attack. Reconstruction efforts began in March 2002. While living in Australia, Tsai also traveled to China, meeting Lei Shih-yu—who had remarried—for the first time in four decades at Baoding railway station.

== Death ==
Tsai died in Brisbane, Australia, on 29 May 2005, aged 84.

== Legacy ==
In 1997, the dance team of Kaohsiung Municipal Tsoying Senior High School were invited to perform alongside students of the Academy of the Arts at Queensland University of Technology, and the performance was jointly dedicated to Tsai Jui-yueh and Lee Tsai-er. The 2005 season of Dance Bytes performances took place shortly after her death and were hosted in Tsai's honor by QUT, where she had been awarded an honorary doctorate, and featured students of the Taipei National University of the Arts. The inaugural Tsai Jui-Yueh International Dance Festival was organized in her honor in 2006. Her former studio opened as a museum in May 2007 and a memorial was added to the site in March 2008. In 2017, the Tsai Jui-yueh Dance Research Institute and the Nylon Cheng Liberty Foundation and Memorial Museum jointly organized demonstrations marking the anniversary of the February 28 incident. Tsai's life was commemorated by the National Human Rights Commission, a division of the Control Yuan, in November 2020. In 2024, a picture book titled Dance of the Seagull – the Story of Tsai Jui-yueh was written by Chiang Shu-wen and illustrated by Lin Yi-hsiang.

Tsai is considered the mother of modern dance in Taiwan. One of her students, Henry Yu, was the first Asian man to join the Martha Graham Dance Company, and has been called the father of Taiwanese modern dance.
