= Maki Ishii =

Japanese composer

- 石井 眞木
- Born: May 28, 1936; Tokyo, Japan
- Died: April 8, 2003 (aged 67); Kashiwa, Chiba, Japan
- Occupation: Composer
- Spouse: Christa Ishii-Meinecke
- Father: Baku Ishii
- Relatives: Kan Ishii (brother)

Maki Ishii (Japanese: 石井 眞木, Hepburn: Ishii Maki; May 28, 1936 – April 8, 2003) was a Japanese composer of contemporary classical music.

== Biography ==
Born in Tokyo, Ishii studied composition privately (with Akira Ifukube and Tomojiro Ikenouchi) and conducting with Akeo Watanabe from 1952 in Tokyo. In 1958, he moved to Berlin, where he continued his studies under Boris Blacher and Josef Rufer. In 1962 he returned to Japan (Kanazawa and Itoh 2001).

His music has been performed by the taiko group Kodo and he has composed for Japanese instruments as well as symphony orchestra and other Western instruments.

In 1999, Ishii produced the opera Tojirareta Fune. That same year Ishii received the Medal of Honor with Purple Ribbon for his contributions to Japanese music. His father was the first recipient of the award 44 years earlier.

He died in Kashiwa, Chiba, Japan, at the Kashiwa National Cancer Center of thyroid cancer on April 8, 2003, at the age of 66.

== Selected works ==
Orchestral Music

- Symphonic Poem GIOH, Op. 60. (1984); recorded 1988 DENON, The Contemporary Music of Japan, COCO-70960, Kyoto Symphony Orchestra, Koizumi, Kazuhiro conductor, Akao, Michiko, Yokobue, a typical Japanese Flute.
- Sō-Gū II for Gagaku and Symphonic Orchestra, recorded 1971 Parlophone by the Gagaku Ensemble and the Japan Philharmonic Orchestra under Seiji Ozawa.
- Score for Tokyo: The Last Megalopolis 1988

== Sources ==
- Funayama, Takashi. 1997. "Klänge zwischen Ost und West: Betrachtungen zu Maki Ishiis Fūshi", translated by Reinhold Quandt and Chris Drake. In Sei no hibiki, tō no hibiki: Ishii Maki no ongaku—Futatsu no sekai kara no sōzō/Westlicher Klang, östlicher Klang: Die Musik Maki Ishiis—Schöpfung aus zwei Musikwelten, edited by Christa Ishii-Meinecke, 118–49. Celle: Hermann Moeck. ISBN 3-87549-053-3.
- Kanazawa, Masakata, and Tatsuhiko Itoh. 2001. "Ishii, Maki". The New Grove Dictionary of Music and Musicians, second edition, edited by Stanley Sadie and John Tyrrell. London: Macmillan Publishers.
- Kido, Toshirō. 1997. "Ikonologie der Klänge: Die Musik Maki Ishiis und das räumliche Konzept in der traditionellen japanischen Musik", translated by Robin Thompson and Christa Ishii-Meinecke. In Sei no hibiki, tō no hibiki: Ishii Maki no ongaku—Futatsu no sekai kara no sōzō/Westlicher Klang, östlicher Klang: Die Musik Maki Ishiis—Schöpfung aus zwei Musikwelten, edited by Christa Ishii-Meinecke, 180–225. Celle: Hermann Moeck. ISBN 3-87549-053-3.
- Mattner, Lothar. 1988. "Verharrende Zeit: Der Komponist Maki Ishii". Neue Zeitschrift für Musik 149, no. 11 (November): 19–22.
- Sparrer, Walter-Wolfgang. 1999. "Buddhistisches und christliches, expressionistisches und bruitistisches: Zur deutschen Erstaufführung von Maki Ishiis Oper Das Schiff ohne Augen im Berliner Hebbel Theater". Neue Zeitschrift für Musik 160, no. 6 (November–December): 58.
