= Arco Renz =

Artistic director and artist

Arco Renz works as choreographer, director, dancer, actor, curator, dramaturge, and teacher.

As artistic director of Brussels-based dance company Kobalt Works since 2000, Arco Renz creates choreographies in Europe and Asia, as well as commissioned works for Opera Houses and institutional companies around the world.

An important aspect of Arco Renz’ activities is his engagement in projects promoting the development of research and exchange between European and Asian artists: Between 2011 and 2016, Arco Renz engaged in collaborative performance projects of very different nature in Cambodia (CRACK), Indonesia (solid.states + KRIS IS), Vietnam (Hanoi Stardust), the Philippines (COKE), Singapore/Thailand (ALPHA), Hong Kong/Korea (EAST).

Monsoon, a series of research and collaboration platforms bringing together Asian and European artists is an on-going project with editions in Europe, Asia and Australia. A central focus within aRco's specific choreographic idiom is the comparative study of various body practices originating in Asia and Europe.

He teaches dance and choreography in numerous institutions around the world.

Arco Renz studied dance, theatre, and literature in Berlin and Paris before joining the first generation of P.A.R.T.S. in Brussels.

== Training ==
Arco Renz grew up in a family of professional dancers. After high school he studied dance, theater and literature in Berlin and Paris. Later he followed dance training at P.A.R.T.S. in Brussels from 1995 to 1998. He belonged to the first group of graduates from P.A.R.T.S..

== Artistic director of Kobalt Works ==
In 2000 Arco Renz founded the company Kobalt Works in Brussels. One of the focal points of the company are collaborative projects and performances between European and Asian artists. Arco Renz and his company have since created more than 25 full-length choreographies and a series of commissioned works. An important aspect of their activities is the involvement in transcultural and interdisciplinary research and collaboration projects. Over the years Arco Renz and Kobalt Works have built a broad network with important performing arts organizations in Asia; they realized collaborations with performers from, among others, Cambodia, the Philippines, India, Java and Vietnam.

His love for pure, formal dance and his interest in traditional Eastern theater techniques are a recurring element in his oeuvre, in which he seeks a relationship with both Eastern and Western dance. Arco Renz concentrates on the shared space between Eastern and Western forms of movement. His interest in the East goes back to his student days in Paris. There he saw Chinese opera and Noh theatre. He also became acquainted with Qigong and Tai chi. During his first trip through Asia in 1994, he became fascinated by the energy of the Indian Kathakali dance theater. According theater scholar / critic Lieve Dierckx he deliberately circumvents the pitfalls of exoticism or postcolonial stereotypes in the contact between East and West. In creation processes he therefore places himself rather in the role of catalyst and guide than of choreographer. He prefers to depart from the individual freedom of the performer than from pre-established principles. An example of his collaboration in Asia is that in 2011 in Phnom Penh with Amrita Performing Arts. This institution is committed to the revival of classical Cambodian dance and music after the damage caused by the Khmer Rouge. Arco Renz introduced the dance students to contemporary dance forms. He also made his performance Crack (Arco Renz / Kobalt Works, 2011) with a number of them.

The performances 'abstract dramaturgy', in which the body confronts with the parameters of time and space to investigate the emotional potential of abstraction.

== Other works ==
Collaborations in other artistic projects include: Luc Bondy's production of Idomeneo by Wolfgang Amadeus Mozart (2005) and the world creations Julie by August Strindberg (2005) and Yvonne, Princesse de Bourgogne (2009). Choreography Aubade (Francis Poulenc) for La Monnaie. Stage direction and Choreography for the Festival d'Aix-en-Provence Les Madrigaux, based on the madrigals of Claudio Monteverdi. Choreography Cellokonzert (2009) by Bernd Alois Zimmermann with the Brussels Philharmonic in the Concertgebouw Brugge, he created MAD (2010) for Carte Blanche, the Norwegian national dance company. In 2011 he created 2069 for the German Tanztheater NordWest / Oldenburg.

In 2014 Arco Renz and Kobalt Works participated in TABUROPA, a theater and research project that ran for 18 months in Portugal, Poland, Belgium and Germany. He produced the performance Incubadora with members of Lisbon-based Teatro Praga.

== Curator, Dramaturg and Creative Presence ==
Arco Renz has been involved in manifold creation processes with South-East Asian artists such as Eko Supriyanto or Eisa Jocson and many others. He curated several performing arts festivals such as Move Me Festival (Leuven), Indonesian Dance Festival 2017 (Jakarta), EUROPALIA Indonesia (Brussels)

== Teaching ==
Arco Renz regularly leads workshops on dance and choreography in Europe and Asia. He was guest lecturer at, among others, Nanyang Academy of Fine Arts in Singapore (2000), The Watermill Center in New York (1999, 2001), Bali Purnati Foundation of the Arts (2000-2003), Compania Nacional de Canto y Danca in Mozambique (2002), Hoger Instituut voor Dans in Lier (2002), Conservatoire Royal de Bruxelles (2003), Korea National University of Arts in South Korea (2005), RITS - Erasmus Hogeschool Brussels (2007), Taipei National University of the Arts (2009), Taipei Artist Village (2009), ISI Surakarta in Indonesia (2011-2013), Indonesian Dance Festival (2012), University of the Philippines in Manila (2012), PETA Theater Manila (2012), Amrita Performing Arts in Phnom Penh (2010-2013-2014-2015), Académie Royale des Beaux-Arts (in Brussels (2013), ISI Padangpanjang in Indonesia (2013-2014), Vietnam National Opera Ballet (2015), Ho Chi Minh City Ballet / HBSO (2014) and Southeast Asian Choreolab in Malaysia (2015).

== Work as a curator ==
In 2017-2018 Arco Renz was curator of the performing arts program of EUROPALIA INDONESIA.

== MONSOON and International research projects ==
Arco Renz is also the initiator of Monsoon, an exchange platform that regularly brings together artists from different disciplines from Asia and Europe. Monsoon editions took place in Seoul (2006, Gyungi Foundation), Leuven (2007, 2010 and 2017, STUK), Brussels (2013, BOZAR), Sydney (2015), Antwerp (2017, wpZimmer) and Ghent (2017, Vooruit).

== Collaboration with Robert Wilson ==
Arco Renz worked with the American director Robert Wilson from 1997 to 2001. The collaboration included various dance, theater and opera productions: Prometheus: A Tragedy or Listening / Prometeo: Tragedia dell'ascolto by Luigi Nono (1997), 70 ANGELS ON THE FAÇADE: Domus 1928 -1998 (1998), THE DAYS BEFORE: death, destruction and detroit III (1999), Hot Water (2000), Relative Light (2000), Prometheus (2001), Aida by Giuseppe Verdi (2002) and Alceste by Christoph Willibald Gluck (2004).

== Productions ==
With Kobalt Works:

- Think Me Thickness (Arco Renz / Kobalt Works, 2001)
- .states. (Arco Renz / Kobalt Works, 2001)
- Mirth (Arco Renz / Kobalt Works, 2002)
- Dreamlands (Arco Renz / Kobalt Works, 2003)
- Opium (Arco Renz / Kobalt Works, 2004)
- Heroïne (Arco Renz / Kobalt Works, 2004)
- Bullit (Arco Renz / Kobalt Works, 2006)
- i!2 (Arco Renz / Kobalt Works, 2008)
- 1001 (Arco Renz / Kobalt Works, 2010)
- CRACK (Arco Renz / Kobalt Works, 2011)
- DUST (Arco Renz / Kobalt Works, 2011)
- solid.states (Arco Renz / Kobalt Works, 2012)
- Discografie (Arco Renz / Kobalt Works and Marc Vanrunxt / kunst/werk, 2013)
- COKE (Arco Renz / Kobalt Works, 2014)
- Hanoi Stardust (Arco Renz / Kobalt Works, 2014)
- ALPHA (Arco Renz/Daniel Kok/Eisa Jocson, 2014)
- EAST (Arco Renz / Kobalt Works, 2015)

Other productions:

- Elea: Sphingein (Arco Renz, 1998)
- Happy zode (Arco Renz and Sharon Zuckerman, 2001)
- Aubade (Arco Renz in collaboration with Su Wen-chi, 2006)
- PA (Arco Renz, 2009)
- Zimmermann Cello Concerto (Arco Renz, 2009)
- MAD (Arco Renz, 2010)
- 2069 (Arco Renz, 2011)

== Filmography ==
- Heroïne [movie] (Alexis Destoop / Kobalt Works, 2013)
