= Korean fighting fan =

Martial arts weapon from Joseon Korea

The Korean war fan (mubuchae; Hangul: 무부채) was a Korean martial arts weapon that originated in the Joseon Dynasty of Korea. Swords and similar weapons were banned from most people during this time which created a desire for weapons that could be held in plain sight without arousing suspicion. They became most popular among the chungin (middle class) and yangban (upper class).

Craftsmen discovered a way of taking the "pak dahl" wood, an extremely resilient birch tree that thrived in the ice storms and harsh seasons of Korea's mountainous peninsula, and tempering it to a hardness that could resist the edged weapons typical of the era.

== Variations ==
Following traditions of weaponry at the time, Korean combative fans were often built with unique features chosen by their wielder and bore many possible combinations. Some adherents of Kuk Sool Won (guksulwon, 국술원, 國術院) practice the same ancient techniques yet with less-lethal equipment (i.e. smaller fans designed for dancers as opposed to the heavier, massive combat fans).

Some combative fan users wove flexible metal ribbons along the outermost edge for cutting power, while others preferred feathers that hid finger-sized razor blades, which could cut deeply upon raking the fan's edge along a target. Other fans were designed to hold vials of poison or were used to conceal other weapons such as propelled daggers which could be released upon snapping the fan open, a technique a few modern martial artists are said to still practice and cultivate.

Poison fans often hid deadly or stunning concoctions in small bladders or sacs which could be released upon spreading the fan open, allowing the user to gently direct a gust of irritants and toxins at their opponent over short distances.

Folklore and hearsay also suggests traveling merchants who possessed fans that had small compartments built into the cloth folds between the vanes of the fan, which held tiny explosive pellets that upon striking a surface would create a bright and dazzling flash of light.

== See also ==
- Buchaechum – Korean fan dance
- Japanese war fan
