= Buchaechum =

Korean fan dancing

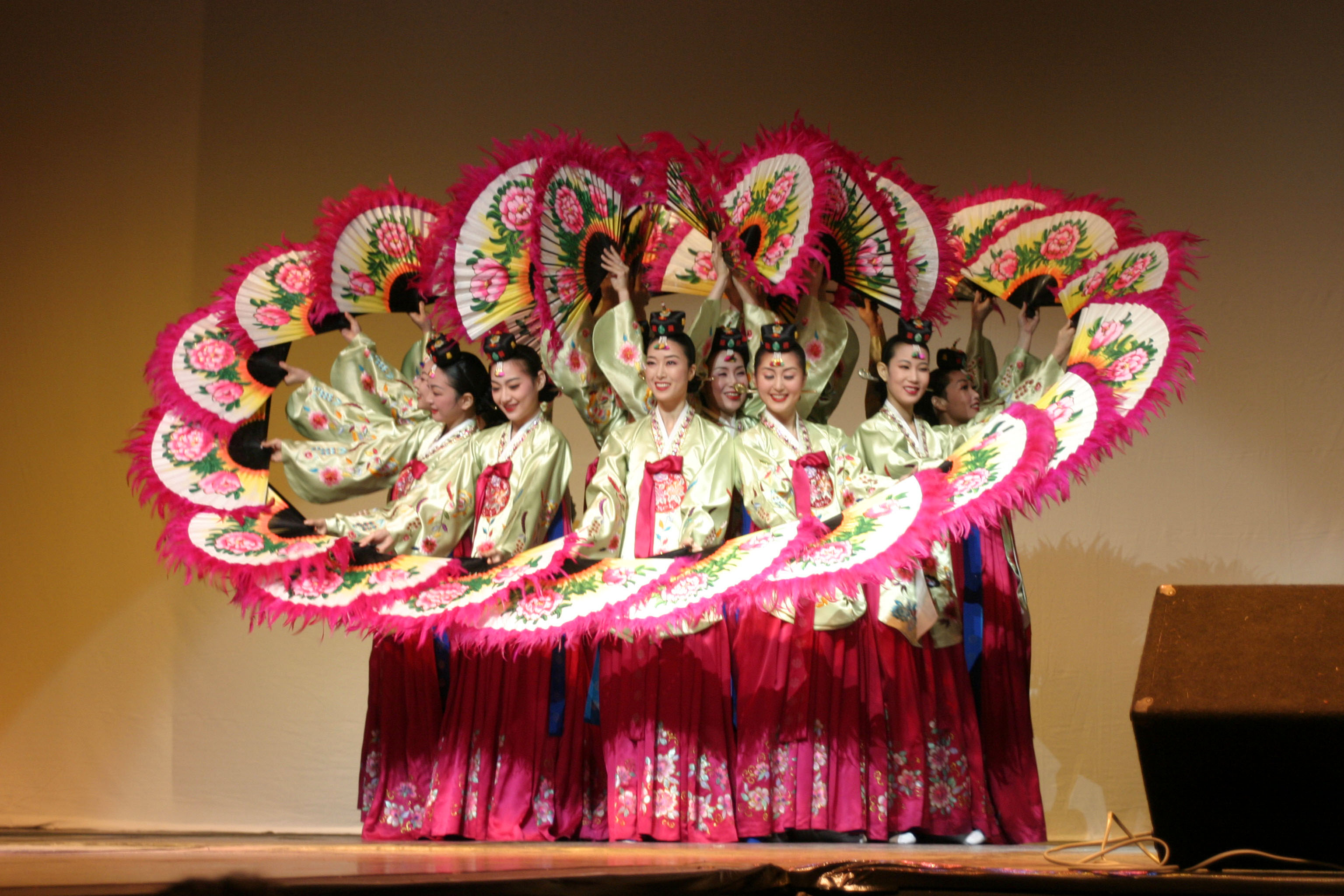

Korean name
- Hangul: 부채춤
- RR: buchaechum
- MR: puch'aech'um

Buchaechum (Korean: 부채춤; lit. 'fan dance') is a Korean fan dance originating from various traditional and religious Korean dances. It is usually performed by groups of female dancers.

== History ==
Buchaechum was created in 1954 by dancer Kim Baek-bong, who drew influences from both Korean shamanic ritual dances and traditional Joseon court and folk dances.

== Performances ==
This dance is performed at many celebrations and events in Korea, and has become popular worldwide. Dancers use large fans painted with pink peony blossoms to create various formations that represent images such as birds, flowers, butterflies, dragons and waves. The dancers wear brightly coloured hanbok, the Korean traditional dress. Buchaechum is usually performed with minyo (folk song) or sanjo (instrumental solo) accompaniment, though court and ritual music is often used as well.

== See also ==
- Korean dance
- Korean culture
- Korean fighting fan
