= H. T. Chen =

American dancer and choreographer (1947–2022)

Hsueh-Tung Chen (June 23, 1947 – June 12, 2022) was an American dancer and choreographer who formed his own dance company in New York City in 1978.

== Biography ==
=== Early years and education ===
Chen was born to Chiang and Hsian Yuan Ming Chen in Shanghai, China, raised in Taiwan, and was a resident of New York City since 1971. He graduated from the University of Chinese Culture in Taiwan, the Juilliard School in New York City (1976) and New York University's Department of Dance Professions, where he received his master's degree in Dance Education. In New York, he also studied at the Martha Graham School of Contemporary Dance and was a scholarship student at the American Dance Center. After working for five years at the La Mama Experimental Theater Club in New York City, Chen turned to presenting his own work, forming his dance company H.T. Chen & Dancers in 1978.

=== H.T. Chen & Dancers ===
The company appeared in contemporary dance venues throughout the United States, and has toured to Europe twice and to Asia seven times. It is housed with an associated dance school and theater at the H. T. Chen Dance Center, in Manhattan's Chinatown neighborhood at 70 Mulberry Street. The building, a converted historic public school by C. B. J. Snyder, also houses other community organizations.

=== Awards ===
Chen was the recipient of numerous awards, including grants and fellowships from the National Endowment for the Arts, New York State CAPS, The Jerome Foundation, and Meet the Composer, and was choreographer in residence at THE YARD - a Colony for The Performing Arts. He received the Mid-Career award from the Martha Hill Dance Fund, along with his wife Dian Dong, in 2012. H.T. Chen's professional credits included choreographing and performing in Off-Broadway productions, television, and the concert stage. He taught at the Navajo Community College and the New York University Department of Dance and Dance Education. Chen completed a three-week residency in the Island of Mauritius as an Arts America speaker for the United States Information Service.

=== Works ===
As important as creating new works to Chen was providing cultural arts services to the local community. The Arts Gate Center was established in 1980 as a year-round performing arts school in Chinatown, offering classes in ballet, modern dance, Chinese dance, and music. In 1988, Chen established Mulberry St Theater, Chinatown's first performing arts venue. Programming for the Theater included three new series, Newsteps, Ear to the Ground, and Moving Word which provide commissions and production support for emerging artists of color.

Chen was a longtime advocate for the arts. Working with Dance Theater Workshop's National Performance Network, Chen coordinated the Asian Arts Partnership Program (AAPP) which serves as an ongoing cultural exchange between American artists and Asian artists.

=== Directorships ===
Chen served on the board of trustees for Dance Theater Workshop, DANCE/USA, and Pan Asian Repertory Theater. Chen served on numerous dance panels, including National Endowment for the Arts, New York State Council on the Arts, and Massachusetts Cultural Council. In 2002, H.T. Chen & Dancers received the New York State Governor's Arts Award – the first Asian American performing arts organization to receive this award. In 2003, H.T. Chen received the Lifetime Achievement Award from the Organization of Chinese Americans - Long Island Chapter, and in 2004 the CUNY Asian Alumni Award for Community Service.

== Death ==
Chen died from lung cancer on June 12, 2022, in Manhattan.
