= Liu Feng-shueh =

Taiwanese choreographer (1925–2023)

Liu Feng-shueh (1925 – 17 May 2023) was a Taiwanese dance choreographer known for her research and numerous works.

== Family and early life ==
Liu Feng-shueh was born in 1925 in China. As a child she studied ballet.

== Career ==
In the 1950s she began studying Taiwanese indigenous dance and the traditions of indigenous peoples. In 1965 she went to Japan to further her dance study at the Imperial Household Agency. Following this she traveled to the People's Republic of China to do research on Tang dynasty dance practices represented in cave art. She then traveled to London where in 1987 she received a doctorate in dance from the Laban Centre for Movement and Dance. She was the first person in Taiwan to hold a doctorate in dance.

She went on to produce innovative work and research in the genera of modern dance, Confucian dance, Tang dynasty court dance, and Taiwanese indigenous dance.

In 1996 she staged her 109th work, Tsao Pi and Chen Mi, performed at the National Theater to sold-out audiences.

== Death ==
She died peacefully in May 2023 at the age of 97.

== Awards and recognition ==
She was recognized by the Congress on Research in Dance as an outstanding scholar of dance in 1977 and 2004.

In 1997 she was awarded one of the inaugural National Arts Awards by the Taiwanese National Culture and Arts Foundation.

== See also ==
- Art in Taiwan
