= Kan Ishii =

Japanese composer

- 石井 歓
- Born: 9 November 1927; Tokyo, Japan
- Died: 22 January 2008 (aged 80); Yokohama, Japan
- Occupation: Composer
- Father: Baku Ishii
- Relatives: Maki Ishii (brother)

Kan Ishii (Japanese: 石井 歓, Hepburn: Ishii Kan; 30 March 1921 in Tokyo, Japan – 24 November 2009 in Yokohama, Japan) was a Japanese composer. His father, Baku Ishii, was a prominent Japanese ballet dancer, and his brother Maki Ishii was also a composer. His Symphonia Ainu won a prize at the 1958 Art Festival, inspiring him to do further work inspired by nationalist primitivism. His musical style appeals directly to the emotions, and shows the influence of Carl Orff. In addition to orchestral and vocal music, he has written extensively for the stage, including 6 operas, 3 ballets and 9 film scores, including the 1962 science-fiction film Gorath. Ishii accepted a position as professor at Shōwa College of Music in 1986.

== Selected works ==
- Marimo (ballet)
- Sinfonia Ainu for soprano, chorus and orchestra
- Suite from Marimo for orchestra
- Going in a Wide Plain for wind orchestra
- Music for Percussions by Eight Players
- Sonata for viola and piano (1962)
- Preludes for piano
- The Music for Flute (flute solo)
- Songs of a Withered Tree and the Sun for male chorus and piano
- Japanese Folk Songs for voice and piano
- Gorath (film score)
- Kesa and Morito (袈裟と盛遠) (opera, 1968)
