= Su Wen-chi =

Taiwanese performance artist

Su Wen-chi (Chinese: 蘇文琪; pinyin: Sū Wénqí; born 1977) is a Taiwanese performance artist and choreographer who integrates technology into the fields of dance, new media art, and performance. Her works explore the boundaries of human perception and the relationship between the body and digital environments. Rather than focusing on human-centric perspectives, she probes into the realms of civilization and human nature. Her works aim to encourage individuals to engage deeply with various facets and intricate details of existence.

== Career ==
Su Wen-chi was born in 1977 and developed a passion for dance from a young age. She pursued her undergraduate studies at Fu Jen Catholic University, majoring in French in the Department of Foreign Languages. Following her passion for the arts, she furthered her education at Taipei National University of the Arts, where she earned a master's degree in New Media Arts.

Su returned to dance during her junior year of university. After graduation, she joined Halo Dance Company and was a dancer with Taiwan's Halo Dance Ensemble from 1998 to 2001. In 2002, she relocated to Belgium to join Kobalt Works, which altered her dance language and style.

In 2005, Su established her dance studio, YiLab, to explore the intersection of dance and new media arts. She also joined the European Organization for Nuclear Research (CERN), where she was involved in their arts program.

== Works ==
Su Wen-chi attempts to rethink the possibilities of performing arts from the perspective of new media by combining the concepts and forms of new media and performing arts, focusing on the controversy and reflection of contemporary art in the face of the impact of digital technology. Loop Me, ReMove Me, and W.A.V.E 微幅 are the works in which she explores the role of "medium" as a mediator that influences human perception by interacting with the human body.

Starting from Loop Me, she initiated contemplation on the evolving relationship between the body and technology in her works, integrating a substantial amount of technological and new media elements into her series. In addition, Loop Me presented the impact of science and technology on human existence and a distinctive perspective between the human body and body imagery.

In ReMove Me, a subsequent work of Loop Me, Su posed a fundamental question: Can the human body return to its most primal state? In this context, the "primal state of the body" signified the attempt to imagine how the human body can break free from the influence of new media and perceive itself in the most direct and unmediated way. ReMove Me continued to look for the relationship between body and image in contemporary society and life, showing how sensory experience degenerated and disappeared with the progress of civilization and technology.

In W.A.V.E 微幅, Su managed to address the intricate experiences of contemporary life by contemplating the image of waves, which encompassed the interplay between nature and artifice, reality and virtuality, time and memory, and sensory experiences. Su presented the image and symbolization of material near-death experience, and the process of transforming the abstract information into symbols

== Style ==
Su Wen-chi delves into the realms of civilization and human nature, inviting audiences to reflect on various facets of life and the natural world, while contemplating the relationship between humanity and technology. This type of performance art aims to transform intellectual subjects like high-energy physics, the universe, and global warming into immersive poetic experiences.

== Awards ==
Throughout her career, Su Wen-chi received local awards and honors. Her early recognition came in the form of the Jury's Special Award from the Taishin Arts Award in 2009. She earned the Outstanding New Media Award in 2012. In 2016, Su Wen-chi was the recipient of the Accelerate Taiwan Award, which was accompanied by a residency at CERN. In 2017, she won awards at the World Stage Design Awards, including the Alternative Design Gold Award and a Bronze Award in Sound Design.

== Collaboration ==
Su Wen-chi had invited cross-disciplinary artists to collaborate with her. Apart from recognizing one another’s creative qualities, they could discover each other’s uniqueness and differences in background, reminding them to respect the different characteristics of other cultures. Achieving equality between different cultures was a balance Su always sought in her cross-cultural collaborations. Su Wen-chi's collaborative projects included:

=== "Heroïne" with Arco Renz (2009) ===
A collaboration between Taiwan’s Su Wen-chi and Belgian choreographer Arco Renz, Heroine was a solo dance piece performed by Su that dwelled on cultural differences as reflected in the performing arts, namely perceptions of time and space in the West and the East.

=== "Unconditional Love and Fact" with Yi-Fang Lin (2017) ===
Su Wen-chi was inspired to create Unconditional Love and Fact by her 2016 artistic residency at the European Organization for Nuclear Research (CERN), which triggered questions about scientists, research, skepticism, beliefs, and acceptance. Su created Unconditional Love and Fact with Lin I-fang (林怡芳), a Taiwanese dancer based in Montpellier, France.

=== "Infinity Minus One" (2018) ===
In addition to the Taiwanese creative team, Indonesian and Japanese artists were also invited to participate in the work, cutting in from the original limbs, shouting, sight imaging, etc., to show the cosmic image in the heart.

=== "Anthropic Shadow" (2019) ===
Through cooperation with visual artists Liao Qiyu, Zhang Humming, and sound artists Lai Zongyun and Esteban Fernandez, Su Wen-chi had indeed broadened the audience's eyes on a small stage, opened the span of space and time, and performed with "long time" and "planet surface" (not even the earth) for the scene, which had indeed reached some kind of "non-human center" visually.

=== With La Prairie (2021) ===
Su Wen-chi collaborated with cosmetics brand La Prairie for Art Basel Miami Beach.
