= Choi Seung-hee =

Korean dancer (1911–1969)

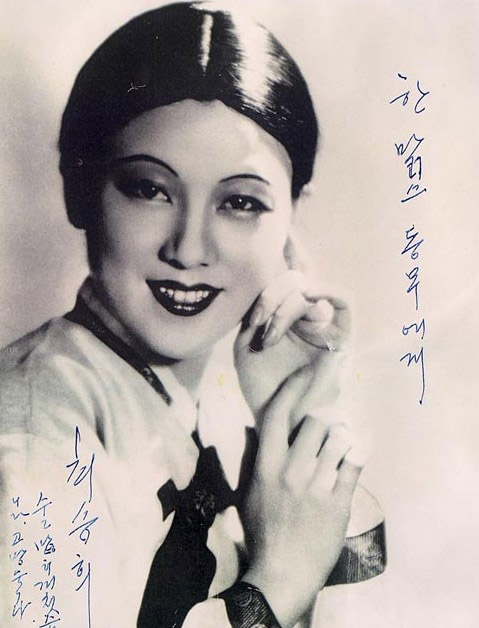
- Portrait of Choi
- Born: November 24, 1911; Jegok Village (Hongcheon County, Gangwon Province), Korea, Empire of Japan
- Died: August 8, 1969 (aged 57); North Korea
- Other names: Mother of Korean Modern Dance; Dance Princess of the Peninsula; Sai Shōki; Cui Chengxi (Mandarin Chinese)
- Education: Sookmyung Girls' High School
- Occupations: Modern dancer; actress; singer; choreographer; model
- Years active: 1926–1967
- Spouse: An Mak (m. 1931; died 1959)
- Children: An Seong-hee (daughter)
- Relatives: Kim Baek-bong (sister-in-law)

- Choi Seung-hee
- Hangul: 최승희
- Hanja: 崔承喜
- RR: Choe Seunghui
- MR: Ch'oe Sŭnghŭi

Choi Seung-hee (Korean: 최승희; Hanja: 崔承喜; November 24, 1911 – August 8, 1969) was a leading Korean modern dancer. Choi is an important figure of early modern dance in Korea, Japan and China who gained worldwide fame in the 1930s and 1940s. Widely known as the "Mother of Korean Modern Dance" and the "Dance Princess of the Peninsula," she was the first Korean artist to achieve true global celebrity. Performing under the name Sai Shōki, she created Sinmuyong (New Dance), a genre that modernized traditional Korean movement for the global stage.

== Early life and education ==
Choi was born into a yangban-class family in Seoul, Korea during the colonial period, and was also known by the Japanese pronunciation of her name, Sai Shōki. Despite the Japanese policy of Sōshi-kaimei, a policy of changing Korean names to Japanese names, she retained her Korean family name of Choi. Sai is the Japanese pronunciation of the Chinese character for Choi, and was not considered Japanese.The multiple pronunciation of her names shows the existing complex cultural relations within the Japanese Empire. When she was a child, her family faced financial trouble after their lands were taken away by the Japanese. Their only income came from her brother Choi Seung-il's manuscripts.

After graduating from Sookmyung High School at the age of fifteen, she tried to become a teacher to help her family financially. She passed seventh amongst 860 applicants, but was rejected due to her age. She was told to return a year later.

== Career ==
Her brother, Choi Seung-il, suggested her to join Baku Ishii to learn the art of dance. Baku Ishii was a prominent Japanese modern dance and ballet dancer (and the father of Kan Ishii who became an actor and a classical composer during the 1940s-1960s). Choi Seung-il was part of the Korea Artist Proletariat Federation (KAPF), and had many connections in both Japan and Korea to journalists and intellectuals. This made it possible for him to connect Choi with Ishii as Ishii also did work for the KAPF. At first Ishii was hesitant to admit Choi as his student, as he believed that the Korean public did not appreciate dance and thought that their performance resembled that of a traveling circus instead of a respected troupe. However, in 1926, he decided to accept her because he thought her addition would encourage a better relationship between Korea and Japan. She was mesmerized by Baku Ishii's performance, especially at his expressions of darkness and torment. Ishii accepted Choi, and even offered to teach her for free and send her to music school. In early 1920s Korea, it was uncommon for a family with conservative Confucian beliefs and ideals to allow for their child to study dance. After Choi gained her parents' reluctant permission, she left for Japan with Ishii, his wife, his sister, and his students on the next day on March 25, 1926.

Choi was Ishii's second Korean student. The first was Kang Hong-shik who left Ishii later and became a movie star under a Japanese name. (The maternal grandson of Kang Hong-shik is Choi Min-soo, who is known as one of the most acclaimed actors in South Korea now). At a time of anti-Korean sentiment heightened by the Korean independence movement and a false rumor that the ethnic Koreans were taking advantage of the 1923 Great Kantō Earthquake to commit violence, which triggered the Kantō Massacre upon the Koreans, Ishii was progressive and open to the Koreans.

Although the dance group performed successfully and brought in a lot of income, they struggled financially because of Ishii's debts. He did not have the sufficient salary to give to his dancers. To pay his debts, Ishii lowered the quality of the performances in exchange for quantity. Choi and two Japanese dancers decided to leave the group.

Choi returned to Korea and founded her dancing art institute called the 최승희무용예술연구소. She had both Korean and Japanese students. Upon her return, she was placed in a spotlight because of the political implications and weight of her international work as a Korean dancer. Magazines and newspapers wrote about her Western dance, dancing abroad, and personal life in Korea. The Korean media had a large interest in her work as a dancer and as part of the "new woman" phenomenon. he was particularly subject to media gossip as an unmarried woman. Choi differentiated herself from traditionalism, but also from the new women who specifically identified breaking jeongjo (chastity) as a more modern practice. Choi was continuously a subject to the public's backlash, as there were several rumors about her committing acts of adultery. Despite Choi's desire to be recognized for developing new dances in Korea, the Korean society only regarded her as part of the "new woman" trend, setting her against the traditional ideal of women. She was seen as an entertainer in the eyes of many Koreans rather than as a modern artist. Choi did not initially intend to study Korean dance at first, as the Korean society did not hold dance to the esteem of fine art; instead, dance was seen as a lowly form of entertainment associated with the gisaeng (courtesan).

During this time in Korea, her brother introduced her to his alumni, Ahn Mak (originally named Ahn Pil-seung) a student of Waseda University. The couple married on May 10, 1931. Just three months after their wedding, Ahn Mak was arrested for his connections with Communist sympathizers, and was released on October 15. Ahn Mak went to Tokyo for the winter semester exam. With Ahn's permission, Choi funded her institute from money earned from sending Ahn's manuscripts to the newspaper companies. Funding was also gained from the sponsorship of The Dong-A Ilbo newspaper company. Choi began to perform Korean folk dances during this time in Korea. Ahn returned temporarily after learning of Choi's pregnancy. Their daughter Ahn Seung-ja was born on July 20, 1932. Choi disbanded her institute. Choi became drawn to the Japanese metropolis after a cultural bloom in the 1930s, she found work and artistic opportunities by appealing to Japanese audiences by using colonial traditions. There was also controversy about Choi's close relationship with the Japanese imperial government. For example, in 1929, the Sookmyung Girl's High School as they threatened to deem her a dishonorable alumni in response to her dancing in a Japanese dance troupe. Such a relationship with Japan made her interesting in the public sphere as only seven of her dances were traditionally Korean.

Choi was a central figure of the Modern Girl (Modeon Geol) movement, using her vocal training to become a recording star for Columbia Records Japan and Taepyeong Records. She released numerous songs under her own name at Girin Records in Manchukuo. In 1933, she recorded a jazz version of "Doraji Taryeong," radicalizing folk music with swing rhythms. She often performed "Singing Dances" (Norae-chum), integrating live vocals into her choreography. She utilized a light, cosmopolitan soprano, avoiding the heavy vibrato of traditional Korean opera. In 1936, she recorded the hit song "A Garden in Italy," which remains a classic of the era.

Her singing style often blended Western jazz and pop influences with traditional Korean sentiments, a reflection of the "Modern Girl" persona she embodied.

Choi returned to Japan with her daughter and with a student from her disbanded institute, Kim Min-ja. Kim Min-ja wanted to follow Choi to Japan, and she offered to work as Seung-ja's nanny. Choi continued to study under Ishii where she distinguished herself as a talented dancer. She developed her own modern dances inspired by Korean folk dances, which had been considered by a lot of the Koreans as lowly works. It was Ishii and Ahn who suggested her to learn the Korean folk dances. Ishii introduced Choi to Han Song-joon who taught Choi more of the Korean dances. At a modern dance competition that was hosted by a monthly magazine 영녀계, Choi performed her Korean dances, one of which she was disguised as a man and artistically imitated her father's drunken dance. (After the competition at the end of one of her later performances 풍랑을 헤가르고, she took off her mask of an old man's face on stage).

Theater organizations in Japan supported Choi and used her image as a colonial woman. They used femininity and Asian Tradition to create a sense of sensibility and superiority of the empire. The image of femininity was anticipated to play a role in bridging the divide between perceptions of colonized individuals and colonial encounters. As well as, alleviating the Western powers' hostility towards Japanese militarism in Asia. Choi's career trajectory and the various spaces in which she performed generated multiple and distinct identities influenced by the desires of the intended audience. The chronological shifts in Choi's career as well as the national tensions she navigated gave insight to contradictions within the Japanese colonial empire. The portrayal of Choi's image coincided with the rapid expansion of media and entertainment during wartime, effectively utilizing Choi's fame for political gain. Her work became a tremendously popular cultural phenomenon in Japan at the time, with Japanese imperialism playing a pivotal role in shaping colonial culture.

Choi and Ahn researched historical texts on the forgotten Korean dances. Choi had already seen the sword dances of the shamans and the kisaengs in Korea. Choi sought an energetic style. Ahn found texts of ancient Korean militaristic sword dances from a library.

Choi began to work as a model. She used the money that she earned from modelling to fund her performances. She also began to appear in musicals. Ahn used his money that was meant for tuition fees to fund Choi's performance.

Ishii continued to have financial problems in 1936. In order to help him, Choi and Ishii's six students performed in Taiwan. Their performances in Japan and Taiwan were all successful. Not long after her return from Taiwan, Choi bought a two-story mansion in Tokyo.

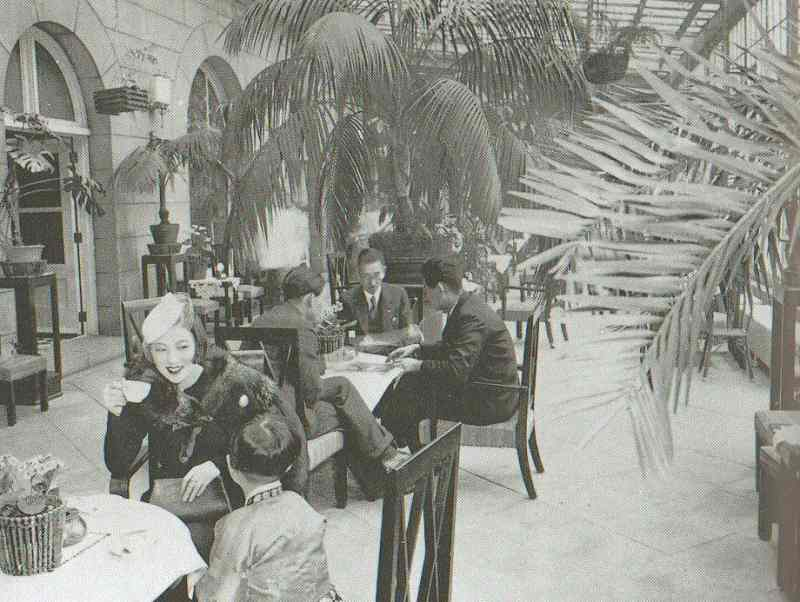
Choi drinking a cup of coffee at the Chosen Hotel (current Josun Hotel & Resort) in Seoul, Korea, 1940

Choi was supported by numerous Japanese intellectuals, including Yasunari Kawabata, and corresponded with both Jean Cocteau and Pablo Picasso. She was also a vocalist, and made recordings at Taepyeong Records and Kirin Records (in Manchukuo), before making her 1936 album Garden of Italy at Columbia Records Japan.

As Choi earned fame across several countries as well as in the West, several Japanese critics wrote about Choi's work. Critics They praised Choi's work as they believed that she could represent one of the Manchukuo national mottos that called for Five Races under One Union. Japanese critic, Natsuya Mitsuyoshi also acclaimed Choi's success at her recital in Shanghai in 1943. He described it as a great representation of Asian people looking to form Great Asia under Japanese Rule. Choi performed as a Japanese dancer yet it was believed she sympathized with Korea and she was esteemed by Koreans. Nevertheless, she later received a great deal of criticism in North Korea for assimilating to dancing under the empire.

== Foreign tour ==
Choi was the first female dancer in colonial Korea to perform outside of her country, even though Japan did not allow for dances to express resentment or resistance towards the Japanese Empire.^{[1]}. In 1937 the Japanese military authorities asked Baku Ishii to provide dance performances as entertainment for the Japanese troops after the Sino-Japanese war began. This led Ishii and his dancers to travel around Taiwan, China, and Vietnam with dancers from the Ishii Dance School in Tokyo. Thanks to this tour, Ishii's students earned a grand reputation during the time of the Second Sino-Japanese War (1937–1945). During this time, dance was not only an artistic performance. Choi's performance played with the boundaries that are limited by language and dialect. Her performances served as carriers of propaganda across the Japanese empire. Choi's dance career mainly took place during a time of war as she danced from age 16 to her mid-30s. Because of this, her dance career took place under Japanese imperialism and that influenced the treatment she received from authorities in her country, when living both in South and North Korea. Critics debated the use of Choi's work to spread propaganda and were concerned with how non-Koreans viewed Korea. Such debate was generated as her work made a different socio-political space. She was unlike other dancers because of her identity as a Korean dancer in a Japanese troupe.

On January 11, 1938, Choi, Ahn, and her pianist Lee Gwang-joon arrived in San Francisco. By this time, Choi and Ahn researched many different traditional dances including the bosal dance (보살춤). Choi's performances were held in San Francisco (January 22), in Los Angeles (February 2 - Ebell Theatre), and in New York City (February 19). The reactions of the audiences and the reviews were good. In New York City, she watched the performances of the famous Broadway musicians and dancers. In early November 1938, famous people such as Leopold Stokowski, John Steinbeck, Maurice Dekobra, and Charlie Chaplin went to the Guild Theatre (now the August Wilson Theatre) to watch her perform. Because of her use of the Japanese pronunciation of her name when she performed in the United States, she was criticized as a Japanese collaborator by Koreans in the Korean independence movement, but the Japanese government saw her as working for Korean independence, as pro-independence souvenirs were sold at her American shows.

Choi and her group left the United States on December 17, 1938, and they arrived at Le Havre, France on December 24. The performances were held in Paris (January 31, 1939), Brussels (February 6), Cannes (February 26), and Marseille (March 1). They performed in Switzerland during mid-March, and in Italy during late March. Starting from April 1, they performed in the smaller cities of Southern Germany. In mid-April, they performed in the Netherlands. All of Choi's performances in Europe received rave reviews. According to Choi's letter to her student, her traditional hat (the 초립동 모자) became a fashion trend in Paris. In 1939, in an international dance competition in Brussels, Belgium, Choi was appointed as one of the judges along with Rudolf von Laban, Mary Wigman, Serge Lifar, and Anton Dolin. After this competition, Choi was invited to perform at an international music and dance festival in The Hague, the Netherlands. Afterwards, she performed at the Théâtre national de Chaillot in Paris. The audiences included Pablo Picasso, Henri Matisse, Jean Cocteau, Romain Rolland, and Michel Simon. Picasso sketched a drawing of Choi and gave it to her after her performance.

The people in France were used to the tense situation in Europe that they learned from the newspapers and the radio news. Everyone whom Choi met in France believed that there would not be another world war. Hence, Choi and her group decided to stay despite a warning from the Japanese embassy. She was expecting to perform in Italy, Northern Germany, and Scandinavia. When Germany invaded Poland on September 1, 1939, France declared war on Germany two days later. As the war in Poland raged on, Choi and her group began to evacuate. Their original plan was to evacuate to Italy. This was before Italy joined with Germany and Japan in a Tripartite Pact and before Italy declared war. An employee of the Marseille consulate general warned Choi that Italy might declare war, and that a Japanese ship called the Hakone Maru carrying about 190 Japanese evacuees would arrive the next day from Italy. Choi and her group embarked the Hakone Maru and evacuated to the United States instead. She continued her performing tour in the United States, Brazil, Uruguay, Argentina, Chile, and Mexico.

In 1943, Choi began a series of 130 performances with the goal of comforting soldiers (known as: tairiku imon) in Manchuria, Korea, and northern and central China. Some postcolonial critics in Korea argue that Choi was forced to serve soldiers by the Japanese colonial regime.

== Return to Asia ==
She returned to Japan. Japan changed to total war mode after the Imperial Japanese Navy's attack on Pearl Harbor. All performances needed permission from the Imperial Japanese Army, and to raise troop morale, performing for the military became a requirement. Starting on February 16, 1942, Choi performed for the Japanese armies in Korea, Manchuria, and North China. She performed dances inspired by Korea folk dance as well as Japanese, Chinese, Indian, and Siamese influenced dances. In 1943 she trained in Chinese Opera movement with Meilanfang in Shanghai and in started the Oriental Dance Research Institute in Beiping (now Beijing) in 1944.

On August 15, 1945, Japan surrendered and Korea became liberated. Choi was in China at that time. And she was pregnant. She witnessed the turmoil of the Chinese Civil War. She stayed hidden in fear that she would be accused of being a supporter for Japan. Ahn went to North Korea. Choi went to South Korea. Although she was happy to see her daughter again, she was saddened that South Korean newspapers accused Choi of being a collaborator for Japan. She asked US Lieutenant General John R. Hodge for financial support in her arts, but did not get any further details from him. She went to Rhee Syngman before he was president. He did not have the power to help her.

She went to Pyongyang, North Korea with her husband who was an active supporter of the Workers' Party of Korea. She met the chairman of the North Korean branch of the Korean Communist Party Kim Il Sung before he became the "Great Leader." This was before Kim had a firm control on North Korea; thus, it was a time before the purges. She found Kim to be very supportive. In those days, Pyongyang was a very small city that had very few artists. Kim Il Sung was fond of plays, and he thought about the political benefits that the public arts could give. He accepted many artists. Choi got her kids to join her from Seoul. Her daughter's name was changed to Ahn Sung-hee (안성희). Although Ahn Sung-hee was just a teenager at that time, she already grew tall like her mother, and she already had experience in performing with her. Choi established a dance school and was given an official position within the North Korean administration. On July 25, 1947, Choi sent her daughter, her sister-in-law, and her students to Prague, Czechoslovakia to perform in an international youth dance festival. In December 1949, following the founding of the People's Republic of China she and her dancers including her daughter performed in Beijing for cultural leaders as part of socialist cultural exchange. An Associated Press reporter asked Choi why she did not perform abroad like she used to. Choi replied that she would probably have the chance in the future, but added, "I'm a bird trapped in a birdcage."

In May 1950, Choi, her daughter, and about one hundred artists were sent to Moscow to perform. While they were in Moscow on June 25, 1950, North Korea invaded South Korea. Sending the artists was Kim's scheme to hide his intention to invade. Earlier, Kim had received permission from Joseph Stalin to invade, and on March 30, 1950, Kim went to Moscow to gain the finalization of Stalin's support for Kim's war. Kim received T-34-85 tanks, artillery, military planes, and his reinforced army exceeded South Korea's three to one. After Moscow, they performed in Leningrad (now Saint Petersburg), Kiev, and Novosibirsk. The Korean War was raging on when they returned to Korea. In October 1950, Choi, her son, and her students evacuated to China where they performed. Their daughter rejoined them later after being separated away during the war.

=== Chinese classical dance ===
Choi was influential in the development of Chinese classical dance and of Chinese-Korean dance (N.E. China has a Korean minority), leading a project to pull the dance elements out of Chinese opera. Upon returning to Beijing Choi worked with Chinese opera performers Mei Lanfang, Han Shichang and Bai Yunsheng to analyze the movement in Chinese opera as source elements for the development of Chinese classical dance. Chinese dance artist and director of the CAD Dance Ensemble, Chen Jinqing, identified Choi's work as a model for the field of Chinese dance as it took local folk material and elevated it using modern choreographic techniques. In January 1951 The Chinese Ministry of Culture invited Choi to move her dance institute to Beijing. On March 15, 1951, Choi opened her dance academy in Beijing. She was required to add Chinese dances to her curriculum. Her program is credited with introducing a way of categorizing folk dance and classical dance, that was focused on the source of the material and not the age of the material. Folk dances were those that had been performed by often rural peasants, while classical dances were those that built on Chinese Opera movement. This continues to be a major way of classifying dance in China today. She was well known by the Chinese dancers of that time as someone who deeply influenced the way the Beijing opera was taught.

In July 1951, Choi brought her dance group to Moscow to perform. Starting on August 5, her students including her daughter performed in East Germany. Afterwards, Choi and her group performed in Poland, Czechoslovakia, and Bulgaria. In that same year, she was asked to visit Beijing to perform for Chinese premier Zhou Enlai. She returned to North Korea when the war was still raging on. After the Korean Armistice Agreement, Choi established her dance academy (국립최승희무용연구소) in Pyongyang. She sent her daughter to study in The Bolshoi Ballet Academy in Moscow.

On February 25, 1955, North Korea's Minister of Foreign Affairs Nam Il announced the need to normalize relations with other countries for peace regardless of the social system. (Nam Il was formerly the General of the Army during the Korean War). He proposed an economic and cultural exchange with Japan. Ten Japanese peace delegates visited North Korea in May of that year. The delegates included Ashihei Hino, a famous writer. In Japan at that time, there was a movement to invite Choi to Japan. After the delegates' visit, more Japanese including Koreya Senda, Jukichi Uno, and Tomoyoshi Murayama met Choi in Pyongyang. The government and Ahn Mak feared that Choi would not return from Japan if she performed there. They did not allow Choi to leave for Japan.

There was a power struggle beneath Kim Il-sung between Kim Chang-man and Han Sul-ya in which Han's side lost. A purge followed. Ahn Mak was Han Sul-ya's right-hand man. Ahn was arrested in April 1959.

In 1967, she was purged by the party, and disappeared from public view. In October 1999, a defector named Kim Yong said that Choi was imprisoned in the same concentration camp (18호 관리소) that he was in. On February 9, 2003, an official announcement was made that she had died in 1969, and a monument was constructed proclaiming her a "People's Actress".

== Filmography ==
=== Film ===
Year	Title	Role	Director	Notes
1936	Dancer of the Peninsula (半島の舞姫)	Princess Shirayuki	Kim Gang-yun	Japanese-produced; her debut feature role.
1938	The Song of the Great Diamond Mountain (大金剛の譜)	Lead Dancer	Mizugae Ryuichi	Filmed on location at Mount Kumgang.
1941	Spring on the Korean Peninsula	Lead		A landmark film of the late colonial era, often cited for its high production value and artistic direction.
1956	The Story of Sado Castle (사도성이야기)	Lead / Choreographer	Ahn Jong-hwan	The first color feature film produced in North Korea.
1957	Brothers (Братья)	The Mother	Ivan Lukinsky	Soviet–North Korean co-production.
1958	Through the Storm	Choreographer / Performer		One of her work in the socialist realist style.
1958	Confessions of a College Student (어느 여대생의 고백)	Landlady	Shin Sang-ok	Late-career appearance also one of her final film appearances before her political decline.

=== Documentary and performance records ===
Year	Title	Role	Notes
1939	Choi Seung-hee: Bodhisattva Dance	Herself	Rare color performance footage filmed during her United States tour.
1951	Documentary of the North Korean Art Troupe	Dancer	Documentation of her teaching and performing in China and the USSR.
2004	The Legend of Choi Seung-hee	Herself	Historical documentary featuring restored archival footage.

== Modern cultural impact ==
Choi's music has seen a major resurgence in 21st-century South Korean media. Her recording of "A Garden in Italy" was a central piece of the soundtrack for the 2017 historical film Anarchist from Colony, used to evoke the bittersweet, cosmopolitan atmosphere of the 1930s.

== Films ==
- 1998 - Choi Seunghee: The Korean Dancer. Produced and directed by Han, Sung-Joon. VHS video. West Long Branch, New Jersey, United States: Kultur.

== See also ==
- Korean dance
- Chinese dance
- Wang Su-bok
