= An Seong-hee =

North Korean dancer (born 1932)

- 안성희
- Born: Ahn Seung-ja (안승자); July 31, 1932; Keijō (now Seoul), Korea under Japanese rule
- Died: c. 1967 (disappeared); North Korea (presumed)
- Education: Bolshoi Ballet Academy
- Occupations: Dancer; Choreographer; Academic administrator; Actress
- Years active: 1936–1967
- Organization: Pyongyang Dance Theater
- Parent(s): Choi Seung-hee (mother); An Mak (father)
- Awards: People's Artist of the DPRK (1964)

An Seong-hee (Korean: 안성희; born July 31, 1932 – disappeared c. 1967) was a prominent North Korean dancer, choreographer, actress, and educator. Known as a "prodigy of dance," she was the daughter and artistic successor of the legendary Choi Seung-hee. She is credited with institutionalizing North Korean dance pedagogy by synthesizing Russian ballet techniques with Korean traditional aesthetics, a system that remains the foundation of North Korean performance art today.

== Early life ==
An was born as An Seung-ja in Seoul during the Japanese colonial period. Her mother, Choi Seung-hee, was an international icon of "New Dance" (Shinmuyong), and her father, An Mak, was a leading literary critic and later a high-ranking official in the Workers' Party of Korea. Her mother reportedly began her rigorous training at age three. An made her professional stage debut at age six during her mother's 1937 tour in Tokyo.

In 1946, the family moved to Pyongyang following the Division of Korea. She adopted the stage name An Seong-hee, which was the name of a character played by her mother in the 1936 film Dancer of the Peninsula.

=== Education and Soviet influence ===
In 1953, An was sent to the Soviet Union to study at the Moscow State Academy of Choreography (Bolshoi Ballet Academy). Under the mentorship of Soviet masters such as Rostislav Zakharov, she mastered Vaganova ballet and "character dance." In 1956, she achieved international recognition by winning the gold medal for her "Gypsy Dance" at an international dance competition in Moscow, an event attended by Kim Il Sung. Her training in Moscow is cited by scholars as the catalyst for the "balletic" transformation of North Korean dance, introducing technical precision and synchronized group dynamics to traditional forms.

== Career and pedagogical work ==
Upon returning to Pyongyang in 1957, An was appointed the director of the Pyongyang Dance Theater in 1963. She played a vital role in institutionalizing dance education, transitioning it from an oral tradition to a formalized academic discipline. She co-authored the seminal text Joseon Minjok Muyong Gibon (Basic Steps of Korean National Dance) in 1958, which is now considered a state heritage item in North Korea.

Her choreography is noted for its "Socialist Realist" themes. Notable works include the "Mural Dancer," "Pearl Dancer," and her lead performance as a partisan fighter in the dance drama Chosun Omoni (Korean Mother).

== Disappearance ==
An's public record ceased entirely in 1967. Following the political purge of her mother and father, An is presumed to have been imprisoned or died during the ideological purges of the late 1960s. While North Korea officially confirmed in 2003 that her mother died in August 1969, no official statement has ever been made regarding the fate of An Seong-hee.

== Filmography ==
=== Film ===
Year	Title	Role	Notes	Ref
1936	Dancer of the Peninsula	Young Princess Shirayuki	Debut appearance as a child actress	
1956	The Story of Sado Castle	Soloist	North Korea's first color feature film; featured her iconic "Dagger Dance"	
1956	Ilya Muromets	Mongol Dancer	Soviet production; cameo role while studying in Moscow	
1957	Brothers (Bratya)	Lead Dancer	Soviet-North Korean co-production; also served as Dance Director	

== Awards and honors ==
- 1949: Top Honors, World Festival of Youth and Students (Budapest and East Berlin festivals).
- 1956: Gold Medal, Moscow International Dance Competition (for "Gypsy Dance").
- 1964: People's Artist of the DPRK – the highest honor for cultural figures in North Korea.

== Legacy ==
In 2017, researcher Dr. Bae Eun-kyung discovered the "Yavno Yevgeny Ionovich Collection" at the Russian State Archive of Literature and Art (RGALI). The collection includes 139 high-resolution photographs of An Seong-hee performing in the Soviet Union between 1950 and 1957, providing the most complete visual record of her technical mastery.

== Bibliography ==
- Bae, Eun-kyung (2020). "A Study on An Seong-hee's Artistic Activities through Russian Archives: Focusing on the 1950s." Journal of Korean Dance History, Vol. 42.
- Kim, Chae-won (2021). "The Technical Evolution of North Korean Dance: From Choi Seung-hee to An Seong-hee." Dance Research Journal of Korea, Vol. 79, No. 3.
- Jones, Kim (2023). "Re-imagining Choi Seung-hee: The Lost Choreography of the 1930s and its Legacy in the 1950s." University of North Carolina at Charlotte Research Repository.

== Archival collections ==
- "Yavno Yevgeny Ionovich Collection" (File No. 2017/139). Contains 139 high-resolution photographs of An Seong-hee and Choi Seung-hee during their Soviet tours (1950–1957).
- "Foreign Relations Bureau Records" (Jan 1957). Includes original signatures and performance logs of the Choi Seung-hee Dance Troupe in Moscow.
