= Flying fish festival (Taiwan) =

Traditional ceremony of the indigenous Tao people of Taiwan

The Flying Fish Festival (Chinese: 飛魚祭; pinyin: Lányŭ Fēiyújì) is one of the traditional ceremonies of the Taiwanese indigenous Tao people, who live on a tiny island off the southeastern coast of Taiwan called Orchid Island. The Flying Fish Festival comes from the legends of the Tao people and constitutes the social norms of their society. During the festival period, the Tao people need to be very careful of their actions and words in order not to violate the norms. In addition to Tao cultural heritage, the Flying Fish Festival also emphasizes respect for the natural environment and sustainable ecology.

== Festival period ==
The festival is divided into three seasons, which are called Rayon (the flying fish season), Teyteyka (the end of the flying fish season, normally in summer or autumn), and Amiyan (no flying fish).

Rayon, Teyteyka, and Amiyan are from the Ivatan languages due to their proximity of the Yami and Orchid Island with both Ivatan (Philippines) and Taiwanese natives.

A rich amount of migratory fish are brought to Orchid Island by the Kuroshio Current (black tide) between January and June. Therefore, the festival starts around February or March and continues until October.

The festival includes different ceremonies, such as giving a blessing to the boats, praying for the bumper harvest of the year, and the first-fishing night ceremony. In addition, this is the reason why the Tao treasure the festival, as they believe that the fishes are a gift from the god. The dates of festivals are different between each tribe because seniors in each tribe will decide the date rather than following the lunar calendar.

The Flying Fish Festival season begins when Cheilopogon unicolor fish ('sosowon' in the Yami language) approach the island. The Tao will catch the fish using light to attract them at night. During April and May, another kind of flying fish will arrive, which is called Cheilopogon spilonotopterus (‘papatawan’ in the Yami language).

== Taboo ==
Some taboos during the festival period are associated with the incoming and going of the flying fish. During the period of the Flying Fish Festival, there are numerous things that are prohibited.

- Methods of preparing flying fish are different while in the festival period. Guidelines on how to prepare the cuisines are also important in Tao culture. The fish cannot be cut into pieces; it must cook as a whole, and cutting down the tail and pectoral fins are particularly prohibited.
- There are norms to follow throughout the entire duration of the festival. For instance, according to Youth Development Administration of Taiwan, "Sacred rites giving gratitude to caught fish must occur, or else the fish cannot be eaten—boils and sores will erupt. Fish dried upside-down cannot be eaten, even if later righted. Non-Yami are exempted from these rules, and can eat their fill without worry. Dried fish is an especially good accompaniment to alcohol. Those Yami specialties, prepared sweet potatoes and taro, are highly recommended to boost long-term memory."
- The Tao people can only exchange fish within their own tribe. Additionally, the Tao people have to eat raw fish eyes as soon as the fish is caught in order to avoid the fish escaping.

== Museum ==
- Lanyu Flying Fish Cultural Museum (Chinese: 蘭嶼飛魚文化會館; pinyin: Lányǔ Fēiyú Wénhuà Huìguǎn) is located in Taitung County, Taiwan since 2005.
