= Cloud Gate Dance Theater =

Taiwanese modern dance group

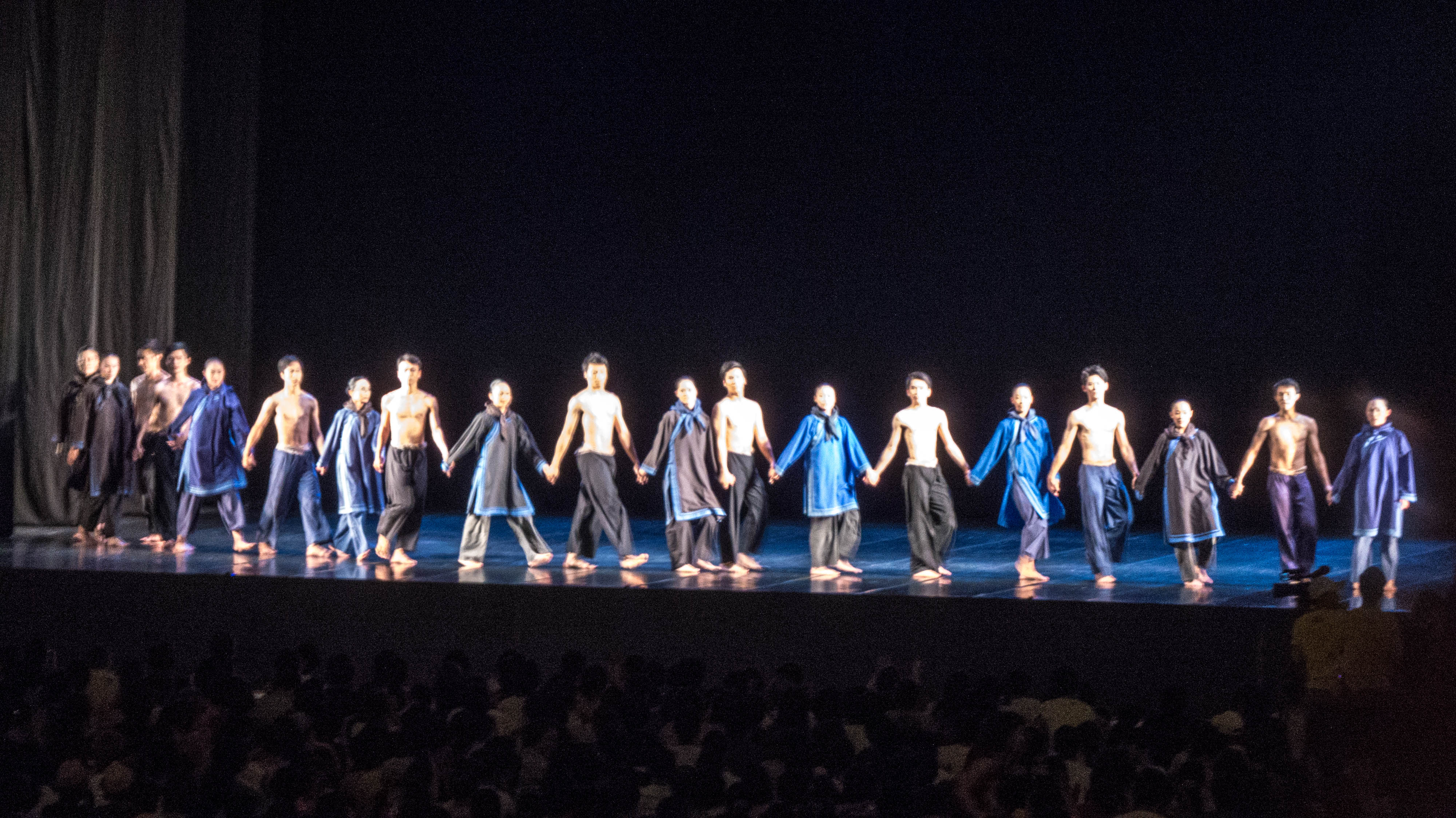
The group takes a curtain call after a 2014 performance of Crossing the Ocean and Legacy at Chiang Kai-shek Memorial Hall

Cloud Gate Dance Theatre (Chinese: 雲門舞集; pinyin: Yúnmén Wǔjí) is a modern dance group based in Taiwan. It was founded by choreographer Lin Hwai-min in 1973, and later he shared its management with his late protégé, choreographer Lo Man-fei. The troupe was inactive from October 1988 to September 1990. During this time, Lin spent time abroad in India and Indonesia, and studied at New York University.

The minor planet 200025, discovered on 25 July 2007, was formally named 200025 Cloud Gate for Cloud Gate Dance Theater on 29 April 2010, becoming the first minor planet to be named for a Taiwanese performing arts group.

== Stylistic innovations ==
Lin Hwai-min, the founder of Cloud Gate, is also an author of short stories. His skills as a storyteller often influences his choreography.

Established in the 1970th, Cloud Gate created an unbroken series of dances and dance directions. Under the leadership of Lin Hwai-min, the Cloud Gate Dance Theater held debut public performance at Zhongshan Hall (中山堂) in Taipei in 1972. The dance group is known for its blending of modern stylizations of Asian mythology, folklore, and ancient aesthetics. Dancers practice and perform using a diversity of movement disciplines and artistic approaches such as qigong, tai chi, meditation, martial arts, modern dance, ballet, and calligraphy.

Cloud Gate has produced a variety of dance productions that explore Taiwanese cultural experiences within the broader context of Chinese and Asian cultures. These productions include works such as:

- White Serpent Tale (Baishezhuan), an adaptation of the Chinese folktale Legend of the White Snake.
- Han Shih, a retelling of the legends of Jie Zhitui and the origin of the Tomb-Sweeping Festival.
- Crossing the Ocean (Du Hai), a dance rich with layered references to generations of Chinese who have crossed the Taiwan Straits to reach Taiwan.
- Liao Tianding, a portrayal of a legendary Taiwanese Robin Hood character who foiled oppressive officials during the period of the Japanese occupation of Taiwan.
- Wu Feng, a long-form piece with echoes of The Rite of Spring, based on the Wu Feng Legend concerning an official from mainland China who was involved in early efforts to pacify aborigines in Taiwan.

== Organization ==
Known for its extensive international tours, Cloud Gate has performed in Europe, Asia, North America, and South America. The company also spends much of its time performing throughout Taiwan, and is generally acknowledged as the country's premier dance organization. In recognition of its importance locally and internationally, on August 21, 2003, Taiwan's government proclaimed the day "Cloud Gate Day" and named the street on which the company's office lies "Cloud Gate Lane." This was the first time in Taiwan's history a day and place were named after a living artist or active artistic organization.

The organization operated two other branches aside from its main dance company. One, called "Cloud Gate 2", toured communities and worked with and helped develop young dancers and choreographers. It was founded in 1999. The other, Cloud Gate Dance School was founded in 1998 with a view to making dance education more broadly available. After the death of Lo Man-fei, Lin Hwai-min ran Cloud Gate 2 until 2014, when Cheng Tsung-lung took over. Cheng had been with the troupe as guest choreographer since 2006.

== 2008: a new era begins for Cloud Gate ==
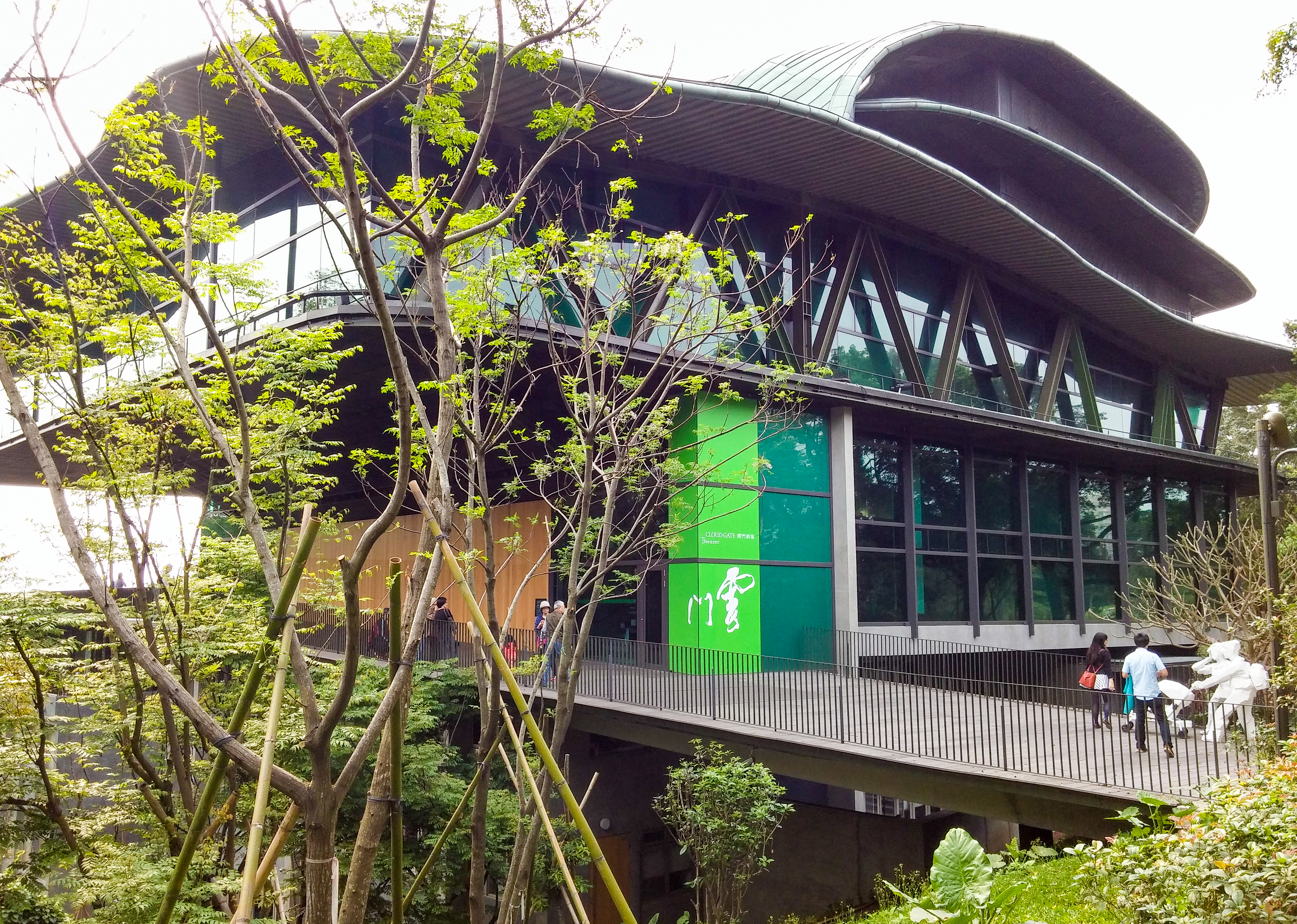
Cloud Gate Theater, located at Danshui, New Taipei City

On 11 February 2008, a fire destroyed the Cloud Gate Dance Theater's studio, costume, props and records dating to 1975 in the production archives. Donations to rebuild totaled NT$370 million (US$12 million) from 175 business groups and 3,973 individuals, while the government donated a former art and education site in Danshui. The Danshui facilities were inaugurated on 19 April 2015. It includes a 450-seat theater, a 1,500 person outdoor theater and two studios.

"Whisper of Flowers," the first new production to be staged after the fire razed and demolished the dance company's rehearsal studio in Bali, was a piece specifically created in celebration of Cloud Gate's 35-year anniversary. The production was first premiered in Chiayi on September 12, 2008.

In 2011, Lin attempted to weave contemporary Taiwanese music and modern love songs into How Can I Live On Without You, to show that the troupe's demographics had changed. Lin announced in November 2017 that he would retire by 2019. Cheng Tsung-lung was named Lin's successor as leader of Cloud Gate. In February 2019, Cloud Gate Dance Theater received the Stef Stefanou Award for Outstanding Company at the National Dance Awards presented by The Critics' Circle of the United Kingdom.

== 2020: Lin Hwai-min retires ==
In 2017, Lin Hwai-min announced that he would retire in 2020. Lin and the troupe began performing classic works to mark his exit from Cloud Gate, as well as the retirement of the company's senior dancers. Cloud Gate 2 merged with the main troupe on 31 July 2018. Lin's final performance staged at the National Theater and Concert Hall, Taipei featured a collaboration with Chinese choreographer Tao Ye. Lin continued working with Tao and Cheng throughout 2019, ending his career with a performance at National Taichung Theater in October.

== See also ==
- Culture of Taiwan
- Performing arts in Taiwan
