= Lin Hwai-min =

Taiwanese writer and dancer

- 林懷民
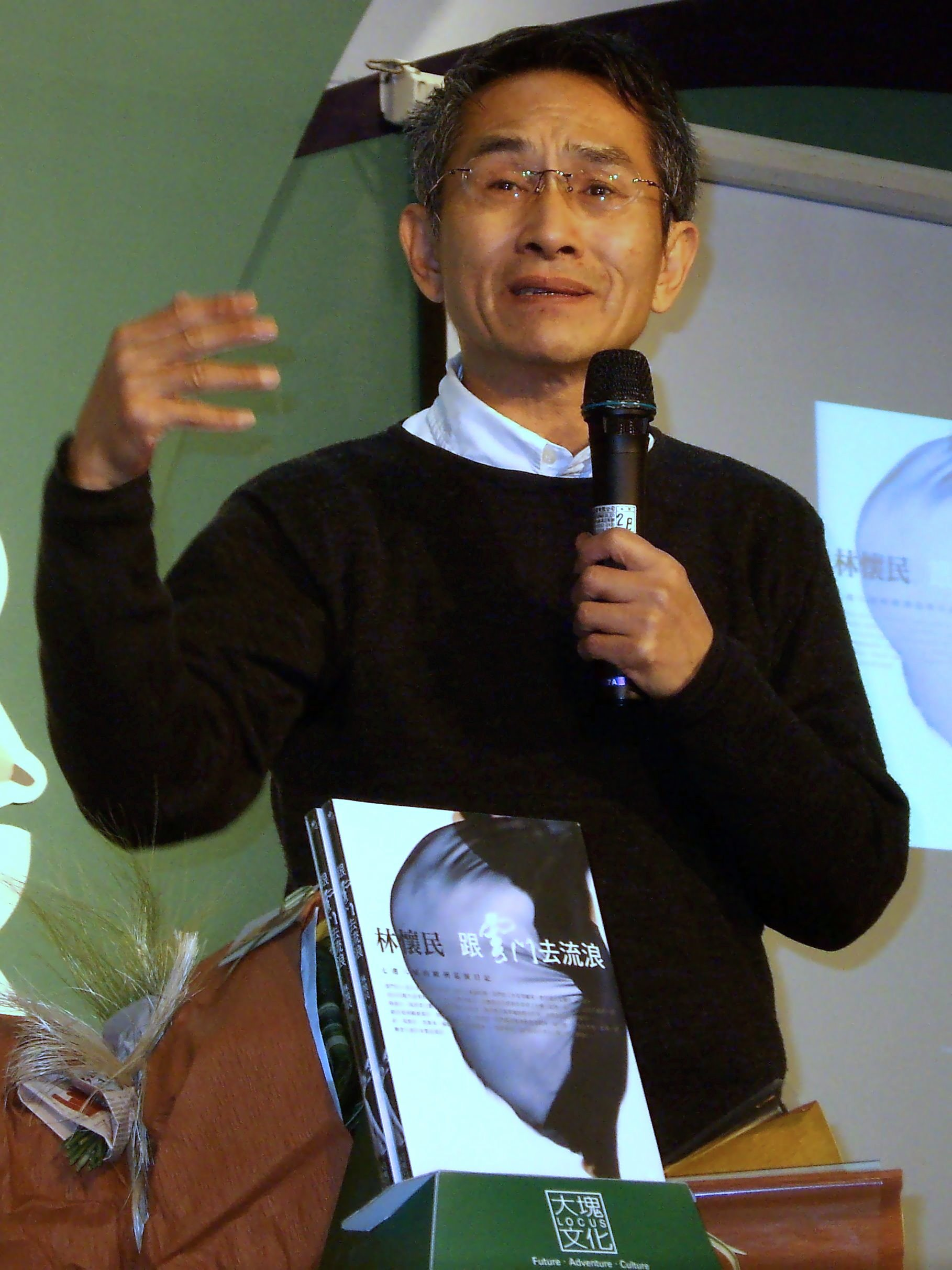
- Lin Hwai-min at the 2008 Taipei International Book Exhibition
- Born: 19 February 1947 (age 79); Xingang, Chiayi District, Tainan County, Taiwan
- Education: National Chengchi University (BA); University of Missouri; University of Iowa (MFA)
- Occupations: Dancer, writer, choreographer
- Known for: founder of Cloud Gate Dance Theater
- Partner: Chiang Xun

Lin Hwai-min (Chinese: 林懷民; pinyin: Lín Huáimín; Pe̍h-ōe-jī: Lîm Hôai-bîn; born 19 February 1947) is a Taiwanese dancer, writer, choreographer, and founder of Cloud Gate Dance Theater of Taiwan.

== Biography ==
=== Family ===
Lin was born in Xingang, Chiayi. He came from an intellectual family. His great-grandfather was a poet and a businessman who founded a school during the Japanese colonial period. His grandfather was a doctor and his father, Lin Chin-sheng, obtained a law degree from the Tokyo Imperial University. After Chiang Kai-shek established rule in Taiwan in 1949, Lin's father held several important political positions, including the office of Chiayi County Magistrate from 1951 to 1954. His mother Lin Cheng Pen-pen graduated from the Tokyo Economics College. He is the oldest of five children.

=== Childhood and education ===
Lin's family enjoyed the arts. His father loved visual arts while his mother enjoyed classical music. Lin was exposed to different art forms and culture very early on in his childhood. He would go on to say that "My story has all along been a mixture of Taiwanese-Chinese, Western and Japanese influences - my parents were educated in Japan."

Lin attended Chun Wen Elementary School in Chiayi for one year before transferring to Taichung First High School. He next moved to Weido, a private Catholic Brothers’ boy school. His father encouraged him to take on law studies at the National Chengchi University but after a year, he switched majors to journalism. Graduating with a degree in journalism, Lin was drafted into the army with an office job in communications in Taipei.

At an early age, Lin showed great interest in writing and reading. He published his first story in United Daily News at the age of fourteen. At the age of eighteen, he was engaged as one of the contract writers for Crown, one of Taiwan's biggest magazines. In 1969, his story entitled Cicada that narrated the theme of Taiwanese "Lost Generation" gained popularity amongst the younger generation. This love for reading and writing would later help him conceptualise his artistic vision in his works. For example, he was greatly influenced by Leo Tolstoy's War and Peace while composing his notable work, Legacy. Later, he would inculcate a love for reading in his dance company by giving the dancers each a book in between practices and performances and engage in book discussions with them.

=== Encountering dance ===
Lin was first introduced to dance at the age of five, when he saw the British film The Red Shoes. He was so mesmerized with the movie that he began dancing for his family. His interest piqued further after he saw a performance by American José Limón Dance Company in Taichung. In the 1960s, when modern dance was gaining popularity in Taiwan, Lin enrolled in a dance studio but gave up after three months as he felt he could not learn much from it. Later on, Lin attended workshops by renowned dancers such as Chungliang Al Huang and Yen Lo-Wong.

In 1969, Lin left for the United States on a scholarship to study journalism at the University of Missouri. At Missouri, he received a fellowship to the University of Iowa’s International Writing Program to study under renowned poet Paul Engle. At UI, he participated actively in theatre and fine arts. He also attended a Modern Dance course taught by Marcia Thayer. Lin would later on refer to her strong passion and dedication to the art of dance as an important influence. It is from this increased involvement in dance and fine arts that he sharpened his interest and enrolled in a summer course at Martha Graham Center of Contemporary Dance in New York, where he would later on spend most of his time upon receiving his master's degree from Iowa to hone his artistic skills and knowledge.

== Career ==
When Lin returned to Taiwan in the 1970s, he started writing and choreographing as well as teaching at the National Chengchi University and the Chinese Cultural University. In 1983, he created the Department of Dance at Taipei National University of the Arts and since 2000, he has been serving as the Artistic Director of the Novel Dance Series for the Novel Hall dance venue in Taipei.

=== Cloud Gate Dance Theater ===
In 1973, he founded the Cloud Gate Dance Theater. Since its inauguration, Lin has served as the company’s founder, resident choreographer as well as its artistic director. He disbanded the group in October 1988, traveled to India, Indonesia, and New York University, before returning to Taiwan in 1990 to restart the troupe. Following the continued success of the company, he founded Cloud Gate 2 in 1999. His intention was to form a Chinese dance group to perform works composed and choreographed by Chinese for the Chinese audience. This formed the vision of the dance group in the early years, as Lin would later call it "a very Chinese period". This was an important period as Lin created a heightened interest in the Chinese community for modern dance. His formation of the dance company came at a moment when his country was in the midst of developing and defining its own identity through culture and the arts and his repertoire gave the Taiwanese people an artistic source to the understanding of their identity.

=== International success ===
As the Cloud Gate Dance Theater gained international popularity, the demand for Lin's artistic directions and masterwork increased as well. He collaborated with many international artists and dance groups. He worked with world-renowned stage designer Ming Cho Lee to conceptualize the scenography of Nine Songs in 1993. He also worked with the world-famous Sylvie Guillem and Akram Khan on Sacred Monsters in 2006. Furthermore, in 1996, he debuted as an opera director in the production of Rashomon. However, despite his international success, Lin remains deeply rooted in Taiwan, refusing a position to direct a major European dance company. He said, "How could I leave Taiwan? It is where all my friends and family are. It is out of this that I create".

== Aesthetics and stylistic innovations ==
Lin often assimilates old forms of dance with contemporary style and interpretation. He has composed many original works as well as modified and adapted classical works from Peking opera. He incorporates different art forms into his pieces and marries Western and Eastern aesthetics and style into a distinct fusion signature of the Cloud Gate Company. He is famous for his ability to seamlessly integrate different styles such as ballet, traditional Chinese opera, Buddhist meditation and martial arts like tai chi as well as Taiwanese aborigines ritual dance into his choreographic works. He immerses himself in the study of Asian culture, such as studying court dance in Seoul in 1975 as well as spending quality time throughout his career in Bali to observe local rituals and ceremonies.

Furthermore, most of his works would include themes that relate closely to Taiwan. At the beginning of his career, he was deeply concerned with political changes in his home country and he was also aware of the rise of Taiwanese consciousness. He felt responsible to compose pieces to reflect Taiwan’s history as this also intimately relate to his own past and upbringing. He draws inspiration from diverse sources of artistic styles to create unique contemporary dance movements that reflected Taiwan society's complexity. The dynamic Chinese and Japanese experiences of his family (and Taiwan's colonial past), his western education in the United States as well as his vast knowledge on Asian and Taiwanese Aboriginal traditional cultures and rituals all contributed significantly in helping him form his artistic vision of Taiwan.

=== Notable work: Legacy (1978) ===
The masterpiece, Legacy, is the "first theatrical presentation of the history of Taiwan". The choreography depicts the history of early pioneers who traveled to Taiwan to build a new life on the island. Stylistically, Lin seamlessly combined acrobatics, gymnastics as well as traditional Chinese dance movements to recreate the nation's story on stage. What are ordinary physical laborer's actions of ploughing in the field and harvesting rice are artistically stylised. Legacy was composed at a time when political tensions between the United States, China and Taiwan were high. Coincidentally, it premiered on 16 December 1978 when President Jimmy Carter announced the end of diplomatic ties between the United States and Taipei. It was out of this fragile political environment that Legacy was debuted. Thus, Legacy struck a deep chord and left an indelible mark in Taiwan as people searched intensely for their Taiwanese identity.

== Personal life ==
Lin is openly gay and in a long-term relationship with Taiwanese writer and artist Chiang Xun. They live together in an apartment complex close to the Tamsui River in the Bali District of New Taipei City.

== Bibliography ==
=== Literary works ===
Bibliography of works by Lin Hwai-min available in English (from http://mclc.osu.edu/rc/bib.htm):

- "The Boy in the Red Pant." Tr. John Y.H. Hu. The Chinese Pen, (Summer, 1976): 47-78. Republished in Nancy Ing, ed., Winter Plum: Contemporary Chinese Fiction. Taipei: Chinese Materials Center, 1982, 179-203.
- "Cicada." Tr. Timothy Ross and Lorraine S.Y. Lieu. In Joseph S.M. Lau, ed., Chinese Stories From Taiwan: 1960-1970. NY: Columbia UP, 1976, 243-319.
- "The Dead." Tr. Jane Parish Yang. The Chinese Pen. (Winter, 1984): 44-91.
- "Geese." The Chinese Pen. (Summer, 1975): 33-46.
- "Homecoming." Tr. Lin Huaimin. In Chi Pang-yuan, et al., eds., An Anthology of Contemporary Chinese Literature. Taipei: National Institute for Compilation and Translation, 1975, II, 443-56.

=== Choreography ===
A full list of works is available on Cloud Gate Dance Theater website (https://web.archive.org/web/20131029204126/http://www.cloudgate.org.tw/eng/CG1/CG1_linhwaimin.html)

1974 : Revenge Of A Lonely Ghost

1975 : The Tale of the White Serpent

1978 : Legacy

1979 : Milky Way

1982 : Nirvana

1983 : The Dream of the Red Chamber

1984 : Adagietto

1984 : Rite of Spring, Taipei

1985 : Dreamscape

1986 : My Nostalgia, My Songs

1989 : Requiem

1991 : The Fortune-Number Card and Change of Costumes

1992 : Shooting the Sun

1993 : Nine Songs

1994 : Songs of the Wanderers

1997 : Portrait of the Families

1998 : Moon Water

1999 : Burning of the Juniper Branches

2001 : Bamboo Dream

2001 : Cursive

2002 : Smoke

2003 : Cursive II

2005 : Wild Cursive

2006 : White

2006 : Wind Shadow

2006 : Sacred Monsters

2008 : Whisper of Flowers

2010 : Listening to the River

2010 : Water Stains on the Wall

2011 : How Can I live on Without You

2017 : Formosa

== Awards and accolades ==
A full list of award is available on Cloud Gate Dance Theater website (https://web.archive.org/web/20131029204126/http://www.cloudgate.org.tw/eng/CG1/CG1_linhwaimin.html):

1977 : Ten Outstanding Young Persons, Jaycee Taiwan

1980 : National Award for Arts, Taiwan

1983 : Ten Outstanding Young Persons of the World, Jaycee International

1996 : Award of Lifetime Achievement, Department of Culture, New York City

1997 : Honorary Fellowship, Hong Kong Academy of Performing Arts

1999 : Ramon Magsaysay Award in Journalism, Literature and Creative Communication Arts, the Philippines

1999 : Choreographer of the 20th Century, Dance Europe Magazine

1999 : Honorary Doctorate, National Chung Cheng University, Taiwan

2000 : 2000 Personalities of the Year, Ballet international

2000 : The Best Dance of the Year, The New Zealand Herald

2000 : Best Choreographer, Lyon Biannual Dance Festival

2001 : 2001 Fok Ying Tung Contribution Prize, Hong Kong

2002 : 2002 National Award for Arts, Taiwan

2003 : National Cultural Award of R.O.C., Taiwan

2003 : Best Dance of the Year, New York Times

2003 : The Age Critics’ Award and The Patrons’ Award, Melbourne International Arts Festival, Australia

2003 : Honorary Doctorate, National Chiao Tung University, Taiwan

2004 : Taishin Arts Award for the Best Theatre production in 2003

2004 : Honorary Doctorate Hong Kong Baptist University, Hong Kong

2005 : Asia's Heroes Award, Time Magazine

2005 : Joyce Award, U.S.

2006 : John D. Rockefeller 3rd Award, U.S.

2006 : Distinguished Artist Award, International Society for the Performing Arts (ISPA)

2006 : Best Choreography, Ballet-Tanz and Theater Heute, Germany

2006 : Taishin Arts Award for the Best Theatre Production

2006 : Honorary Doctoral Degree of Arts, National Taiwan University, Taiwan

2007 : Honorary Doctorate, Taipei National University of the Arts, Taiwan

2007 : Honorary Doctorate, National Chengchi University, Taiwan

2008 : Chinese of World Influence Award, China

2009 : lifetime Achievement Award, International Movimentos Dance Prize, Germany

2011 : Ordre des Arts et des Lettres, Ministry of Culture, France

2013 : Samuel H. Scripps/American Dance Festival Lifetime Achievement Award, U.S.
