= Baku Ishii =

Japanese dancer (1886–1962)

- 石井 漠
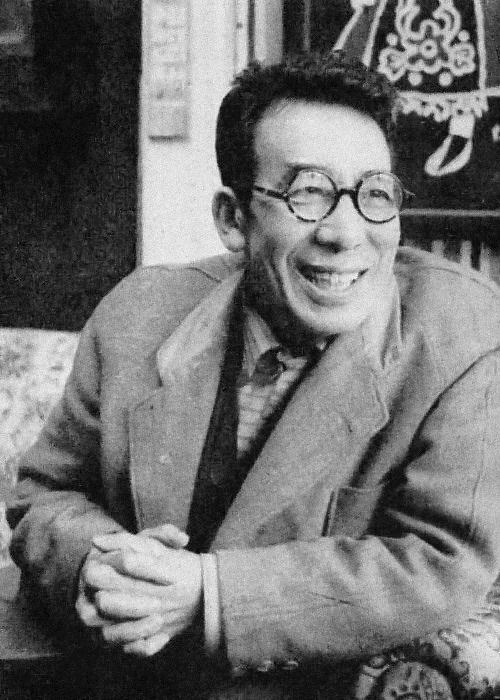
- Ishii in April 1956
- Born: December 25, 1886; Akita, Japan
- Died: January 7, 1962 (aged 75); Kanda, Tokyo, Japan
- Occupations: Dancer; choreographer
- Children: Kan Ishii; Maki Ishii
- Honours: Medal of Honor with Purple Ribbon

Baku Ishii (Japanese: 石井 漠; December 25, 1886 – January 7, 1962) was a Japanese dancer and choreographer. He was a pioneer of modern dance in Japan.

== Career ==
Aspiring to be a composer, Ishii moved to Tokyo in 1909. Through the introduction of Chiyomatsu Nakamura, he became a student of Kosugi Tengai. While residing in Sosen Mishima's house, he gave up a literary career and became an apprentice member of the Imperial Theatre Orchestra in September 1910. However, the violin the Orchestra loaned to him was pawned by Mishima, so he was fired after two months.

After leaving Mishima's house, he joined the opera club as a student and trained under the name Rinrō Ishii. In February 1912, he had his first role, albeit minor, in Kumano. Tamaki Miura praised his voice. Ishii worked in the Imperial Theatre Opera, but was dismissed after opposing the strict guidance of Giovanni Vittorio Rosi.

With the cooperation of Kōsaku Yamada, Ishii turned to creative butoh, separated from his newlywed wife, and practiced at the Tokyo Philharmonic. From June 1916, he appeared under the stage name Baku Ishii. He started "New Theater" with director Kaoru Osanai and composer Kōsaku Yamada. After teaching at the Takarazuka Revue Company, he worked with Yamada and others to launch the dance and poetry movement, opening up a new frontier in Japanese dance. He also became the first dancer in Japan to choreograph and perform a Western-style work.

In 1922, he traveled with his sister-in-law Konami Ishii to Europe and the United States to study contemporary dance. He became a pioneer of modern dance in Japan. In April 1923, Ishii made his debut as a dancer at the Brüthner Saal in Berlin. Learning from Mary Wigman, he performed in Czechoslovakia, Poland, France, Belgium, and the United States. In 1925, he starred in the German film Ways to Strength and Beauty. He returned to Japan in April of that year. In 1926, Ishii traveled to Korea and performed in Gyeongseong, helping inspire the development of modern dance there.

In 1928, he founded the Baku Ishii Dance Research Institute in Jiyūgaoka.

== Legacy and students ==
Ishii's teaching extended beyond Japan and helped shape the development of modern dance in East Asia. Among his students were Choi Seung-hee, Cho Taek-won, and Gang Hong-sik in Korea. Later figures associated with Japanese modern dance, including Kazuo Ohno, also studied under Ishii. Outside dance, the future photographer Yoshifumi Hattori also studied under Ishii in Tokyo before turning to photography in 1937.

== Personal life ==
Ishii was born in Akita Prefecture to a family of sake brewers, and his father was a politician. Composer Gorō Ishii is his younger brother. Composers Kan Ishii and Maki Ishii are his sons. Ishii died of thyroiditis on January 7, 1962, in Kanda, Tokyo.

== Works ==
=== Stage works ===
- 1942 – Adaptation of Kōtarō Takamura's poem "Book of Geography". Music composed by Goro Ishii. Debuted at the Tokyo Metropolitan Hibiya Public Hall.
- 1948 – "Wandering Group". Music composed by Akira Ifukube. Debuted at the Imperial Theatre.
- 1953 – "Ningen Shaka". Music composed by Akira Ifukube. Debuted at the Tokyo Metropolitan Hibiya Public Hall.

=== Writing ===
- The Essence of Dance and Its Creation Method (1927)
- Complete Works of World Music Vol. 30: Butoh Music Collection (1931)
- Ishii Dance and Gymnastics (1932)
- Dance Arts (1933)
- Children's Dance (1936)
- Basics and Creation of Dance (1938)
- From Northern China to Central China (1939)
- My Face Essay (1940)
- World Dance Art History (1943)
- Dance Sanmai (1947)
- Dance Expression and Basic Instruction (1951)
- My Life as a Dance (1951)
- Odoru Baka (1955)

== Accolades ==
In 1955, Ishii became the first recipient of the Medal of Honor with Purple Ribbon after the reorganization of the honor system.

- 1950 – Minister of Education Award for "Mystery of the Sphinx"
- 1954 – Art Festival Award (Commendation from the Minister of Education) for "Ningen Shaka"
- 1955 – Medal of Honor with Purple Ribbon
