= Music of Taiwan =

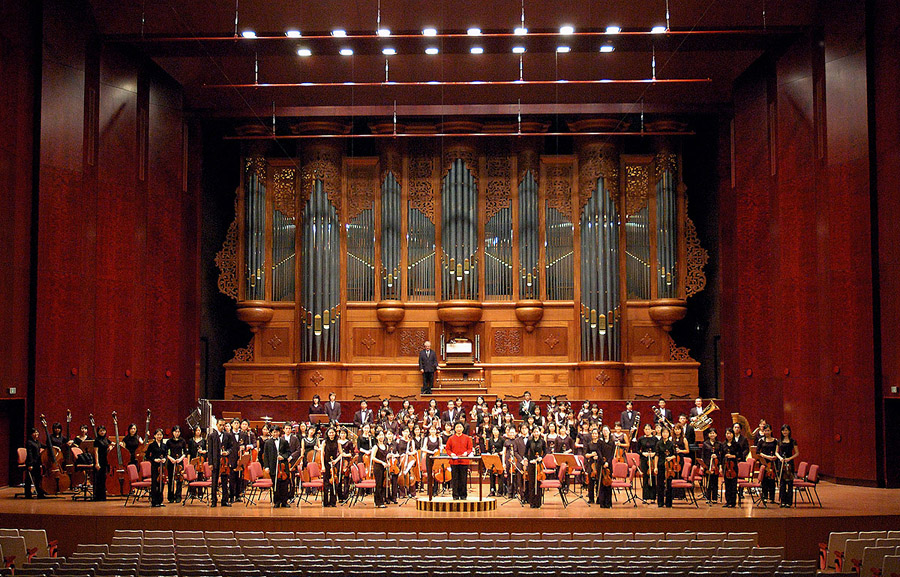
Apo Hsu and the NTNU Symphony Orchestra on stage in the National Concert Hall in Taipei

The music of Taiwan reflects the diverse culture of Taiwanese people. Taiwan has undergone several economic, social, and political changes through its cultural history, and Taiwanese music reflects those issues in its way. The music of the country has adopted a mixed style. As a country rich in Chinese folk culture and with many indigenous tribes with their own distinct artistic identity, various folk music styles are appreciated in Taiwan. In addition, people in Taiwan highly appreciate various style of Western classical music and pop music. Taiwan is a major Mandopop hub.

== Background ==
The Kuomintang-led Republic of China government arrived in Taiwan in 1949, a government that suppressed native Taiwanese culture and implemented Standard Chinese (Mandarin) as the official language. This political event has significant effects on the development of music in Taiwan in the 20th century as it resulted in a gap in the transition of the traditional music culture. In 1987, a revival of traditional culture began when the martial law declared by the government was lifted. (See Taiwanese localization movement.)

Instrumental music includes multiple genres, such as beiguan and nanguan. Nanguan originally hails from Quanzhou, while it is now most common in Lukang and is found across much of the island.

Taiwanese puppetry (hand-puppet theater) and Taiwanese opera, two genres of spectacle that are strongly related to music, are very popular, while the latter is often considered the only truly indigenous Han form of music still extant today.

Holo folk music is most common today on the Hengchun Peninsula in the southernmost part of the island, where performers sing accompanied by yueqin (moon lute), which is a type of two-stringed lute. While the Hengchun yueqin plays only five tones, the pentatonic music can become diverse and complex when combined with the seven tones of Taiwanese Hokkien. Famous folk singers include Chen Da and Yang Hsiuching.

== Aboriginal music ==
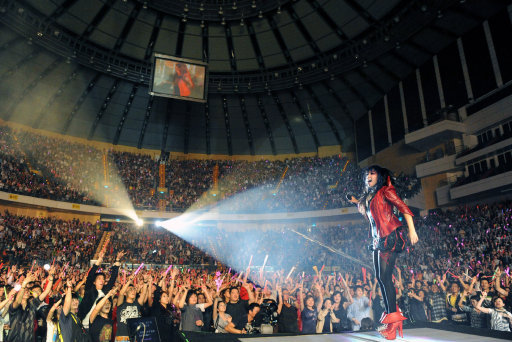
A-mei

Of the two broad divisions of Taiwanese aborigines, the plains-dwellers have been largely assimilated into Han culture, while the mountain-dwelling tribes remain distinct. The Amis, Bunun, Paiwan, Rukai and Tsou are known for their polyphonic vocals, of which each has a unique variety.

Once dying, aboriginal culture has undergone a renaissance since the late 20th century. A full-time aboriginal radio station, "Ho-hi-yan" was launched in 2005 with the help of the Executive Yuan, to focus on issues of interest to the indigenous community. [Listen to Ho-hi-yan; requires Windows Media Player 9]. This came on the heels of a "New wave of Indigenous Pop," as aboriginal artists such as A-mei (Puyuma tribe), Difang (Amis tribe), Pur-dur and Samingad (Puyuma) became international pop stars. Later artists include Paiwanese pop star Abao.

The 1991 formation of the Formosa Aboriginal Dance Troupe was another major contributor to this trend, while the surprise mainstream success of "Return to Innocence", the theme song to the 1996 Olympic Games, further popularized native musics. "Return to Innocence" was made by Enigma, a popular musical project and sampled the voices of an elderly Amis couple, Difang and Igay Duana. When the couple found out that their recording had become part of an international hit, they filed suit and, in 1999, settled out of court for an unidentified amount.

=== Bunun ===
The Bunun's original home was on Taiwan's west coast, in the central and northern plains, but some have more recently settled in the area around Taitung and Hualien.

Unlike the other indigenous peoples of Taiwan, the Bunun have very little dance music. The best-studied element of traditional Bunun music is improvised polyphonic song. Folk instruments include pestles, five-stringed zithers and the jaw harp.

The Bunun wooden pestle ensemble (tultul) originated from communal millet farming, in which wooden pestles were used to pound millet. It is performed by striking pestles of different lengths against stone slabs, with four to sixteen players creating polyrhythmic patterns through coordinated rhythms and improvisation. Originally associated with agricultural work and communal leisure, it later developed into cultural performances and tribal tourism.

In modern times, David Darling, an American cellist, created a project to combine cello and Bunun traditional music, resulting in an album titled Mudanin Kata. The Bunun Cultural and Educational Foundation, founded in 1995, was the first organization established to help promote and sustain Taiwanese aboriginal culture.

=== Truku ===
Truku people are an Indigenous group primarily located in eastern Taiwan, especially around Hualien. They were officially recognized as separate from the Atayal people in 2004. One important aspect of Truku culture is the traditional instrument known as the tatuk, which was first documented in academic records during the 1980s and may have originated from the Atayal instrument Tatuk, now sometimes called “Lubuw Tcingan khoni.” The tatuk is closely connected to Truku communal traditions and reflects the group’s strong relationship with the mountainous natural environment in which they have historically lived.

The tatuk is a traditional percussion instrument made of four wooden bars of different lengths that are struck with wooden sticks to produce sound. The bars are typically made from lightweight local wood and are laid directly on the ground or on stones while being played. Tuned to four pitches (Re, Mi, Sol, and La), the instrument emphasizes rhythm and percussive coordination more than complex melody. Its simple construction reflects its practical role in Truku life: the tatuk was never intended to be a specialized performance instrument, but rather something integrated into everyday communal activities.

Traditionally, the tatuk accompanied communal singing during celebrations, shared labor, expressions of gratitude, hunting gatherings, and farewell occasions. Music among the Truku was closely connected to social interaction and cooperation rather than formal entertainment. Performances were often informal and community-centered, with many people participating together. In this way, the tatuk helped strengthen social bonds and reflected the Truku emphasis on collective life and mutual support.

The materials and sound of the tatuk also carry cultural meaning. Because it is made from locally available wood and played directly on the earth or stone, the instrument reflects the Truku people’s close relationship with nature and the land. Its undecorated design and limited range of pitches highlight practicality and accessibility rather than artistic complexity or status. The tatuk’s rhythmic style suited songs tied to everyday activities, such as organizing communal work or gathering people together to share meals after a hunt. These functional uses show how, for the Truku, music was not separated from daily life or reserved only for ceremonies, but was naturally woven into ordinary social and cultural experience.

== Hakka ==
Traditional Hakka music is made up of three types: Hakka Bayin (客家八音), Shan'ge (山歌, Mountain or Hill song), and Beiguan (北管).

Bayin references the eight materials that have traditionally been used to make Chinese instruments: metal, stone, earth, skin, string, wood, gourd, and bamboo (金、石、土、革，絲、木、匏、竹). It is believed that Hakka Bayin came from a type of wind and percussion ensemble music known as Chungchunban (中軍班). Hakka Bayin was thought to have been brought to Taiwan sometime between the end of the Ming Dynasty and the start of the Qing Dynasty. It is often used in Hakka daily life, such as at festivals, weddings, or funerals.

Hakka Shan'ge is the most popular of the three types. It literally means “mountain song” or “hill song.” Shan'ge has traditionally been sung while people work, particularly during tea picking. Because of this, it consists mostly of improvisations and has not been transcribed. Recently, shan'ge has gained popularity as one of the markers of Hakka culture. This type of music includes the well-known Nine Accents and Eighteen Melodies (九腔十八調), whose definitions are a point of debate.

Beiguan is not only Hakka music, as it generally references music in the area north of Fujian. Out of the two types, instrumental and vocal, instrumental is more popular, and like Bayin, is often utilized in events like weddings and ceremonies.

These three forms of music have been reutilized in Hakka orchestral music. Hakka orchestral music utilizes a mixture of Western orchestral instruments and Chinese traditional musical instruments, like the Erhu (二胡) and the Suona (嗩吶). This is in part because the Hakka Affairs Council has encouraged those trained in Western music in Taiwan to compose Hakka orchestral music. The first Hakka piano concerto, “Heavy Rain” (落大雨) was composed by Sung-Jen Hsu (徐頌仁) in 1985, whereas the first Hakka orchestral work, Hakka Shange Capriccio (客家山歌隨想曲), was finished by Jung-Sung Hsu (徐榮松) in 1996.

== Art music ==
The earliest musical education program in Taiwan was established by Western missionaries during the 17th century, when southern and northern Taiwan was under the colonial rule of the Netherlands and Spain respectively. Missionaries from Europe set up their churches throughout Taiwan for evangelical purposes; this included Protestant missionaries from the Netherlands and the Catholic Dominican Order from Spain. During this period, Western music was first introduced to Taiwan, though church music was the mainstay. It wasn't until the ruling Qing government opened up to trade exchanges with Europe in the mid-19th century that secular Western music began to gain to a foothold in Taiwan. Furthermore, the Western innovation of musical recording as a technology further established Western musical influences within Taiwan. In 1895, Taiwan became occupied by Japan, and formalized Western music education was thus introduced. Under Japanese rule, music was included as part of the core curriculum of Taiwanese academic education and became a compulsory course of study. Notable musicians from this era included Wen-ye Jiang and Chih-yuan Kuo.

=== Qing dynasty rule ===
Rule by the Qing dynasty began in Taiwan in the 18th century; Taiwan's music scene at the time was still largely dominated by Beiguan and Nanguan music brought over by immigrants from mainland China. However, in the middle of the 19th century, the armies of the Qing dynasty suffered one devastating loss after another against European troops, forcing the Qing government to open up the ports to European traders and missionaries. As trade between Taiwan and Europe flourished, the European Chambers of Commerce and Industry set up branches in Taiwan, setting the stage for strong Western influence and an influx of more Christian missionaries. In 1872, Canadian missionary George Leslie Mackay established Presbyterian churches in Tamsui (formerly known as Huwei), as well as schools and hospitals. He also introduced Western liturgical music and art music education to Taiwan, founding Oxford College (now the Taiwan Graduate School of Theology) and Aletheia University. Su-Ti Chen (1911–1992), one of the first-generation Taiwanese composers, was an alumnus of TamKang High School (now TamKang Senior High School), which was founded by Dr. Mackay's eldest son, George William Mackay. Su-Ti Chen studied piano and Western liturgical music alongside Margaret Gauld, the wife of Rev. William Gauld. After his graduation, he enrolled at the Taipei Seminary School (now the Taiwan Graduate School of Theology), majoring in Western Art Music. Afterwards, he continued his music studies in Japan.

Meanwhile, Dr. James Maxwell, a Presbyterian/Calvinist missionary from England, began preaching in southern Taiwan in 1865. In 1869, he and Rev. Hugh Ritchie together established “The Student’s Class” in Cihou and Taiwan Fu (now Tainan), which were coalesced by Reverend Thomas Barclay in 1876 into the Capital College, the first western-education university in Taiwan and the predecessor of the current Tainan Theological College and Seminary affiliated with the Presbyterian Church in Taiwan. The seminary not only had the goal of evangelizing and cultivating theological students, but also brought Western liturgical music and art music to southern Taiwan through mandated courses for its students, nurturing many musical talents in southern Taiwan. To this day, “cultivation of musical talent” remains one of the most important goals of the Tainan Theological College and Seminary.

During Qing dynasty rule, Taiwan's churches played a major role in the spread of Western music through congregation members, foreign merchants, and missionaries.

=== During Japanese rule ===
In 1894, the First Sino-Japanese War began, during which the army of the Qing dynasty was defeated by the Japanese army. This led to the Qing dynasty government signing the Treaty of Shimonoseki, which ceded Taiwan to Japan. In 1895, Japanese rule of Taiwan began, leading to a formal introduction of a Western music education system in the core curriculum of Taiwanese schooling. From then on, Western art music became a firmly-rooted element in Taiwan's musical scene, with Western art music courses becoming mandatory in Taiwanese schools. Su-Ti Chen, one of the first-generation Taiwanese composers, received his formal music education in Taiwan schooling before traveling to Japan for further study.

Important to mention is the influence of foreign recording companies that established itself within Taiwan that further perpetuated both Western and Japanese musical influences. Around the 1930s, companies like Columbia Records (Taiwan) and Nipponophone established local operations or active distribution in Taipei. Japanese and Western companies provided the foundational recording technology and corporate capital for Asia through the records, whilst reaping the benefits of new market possibilities. Musical styles, like jazz or foxtrot, heavily influenced the orchestration of Taiwan’s first commercial pop records.

Tyzen Hsiao, a composer born in Fongshan, Kaohsiung, was taught to play the piano by his mother, who was one of the first-generation pianists to study in Japan. Afterwards, he received further training from Prof. Fu-mei Li, who also studied piano in Japan. Graduating from the Christian Chang Jung High School, Hsiao enrolled in the two-year music program of the Taiwan Provincial Teachers College (predecessor of the National Taiwan Normal University), before continuing his studies in Japan.

From the life history of these Taiwanese composers, we can clearly trace the development of the culture of Western music in Taiwan through two sources. One is the church system and the other the Western music education introduced during the Japanese rule and musicians returning to Taiwan after studying abroad in Japan. Many of the works by these musicians were liturgical, including those written by Su-Ti Chen; although other musicians such as Chuan-sheng Lu and Chih-yuan Kuo created original folk songs. They also composed large-scale works: Chih-yuan Kuo produced the opera Xu-Xian and Madame White Snake, while Chuan-sheng Lu produced Castrated Chicken, a Taiwanese Hokkien opera that attracted the attention of the Japanese ruling class for its incorporation of Western composition techniques.

Many recordings from Taiwan's early recording industry survive through 78 rpm shellac records produced during the Japanese colonial period and the decades that followed. Because many early performances were never documented through film or other media, these recordings remain important sources for understanding musical performance, recording practices, and the development of popular music in Taiwan during the first half of the twentieth century.

The recordings also preserve examples of Taiwanese Hokkien, Hakka, Indigenous languages, and Japanese as they were used in popular music of the period. As a result, they have become valuable sources for the study of Taiwan's music history, language use, and cultural life.

In addition to preserving examples of different languages used in popular music, 78-rpm records also featured many kinds of Taiwanese traditional music, including Beiguan, Nanguan, folk tunes, and tea-picking songs, and Taiwanese Opera (Gezaixi). Among these genres, Taiwanese Opera (Gezaixi) was the most recorded and achieved the highest sales among them because the lyrics were easy to understand, and the melodies could be catchier than other songs, making it more accessible to ordinary people than the complex lyrics of Beiguan or the elegance of Nanguan. Thus, 78-rpm records contributed not only to the preservation but also to the spread and development of traditional Taiwanese music.

Preservation and digitization projects undertaken by archives, libraries, and research institutions have improved access to these materials while reducing the need to handle fragile original discs. These collections continue to support research on Taiwan's musical heritage and the history of its recording industry.

=== After 1949 ===
The government of the Republic of China retreated to Taiwan in 1949. Due to political factors, cultural elements related to mainland China and Russia, including symbols of communism, became taboos in Taiwan, and Western culture became especially prominent. Musicians and music students from mainland China also came to Taiwan to pursue their music education.

After the Second World War, Taiwan's political atmosphere and economic situation shifted abruptly, a change which was reflected in contemporaneous music activity. Scholar Edwin A. Winckler divided the post-war development of Taiwan's music into three periods in his Cultural Policy on Postwar Taiwan (1994):

1. 1945–1960
2. 1960–1975
3. 1975–1990

In 1946, the school that was known as Taihoko High School during the era of Japanese rule, was renamed the Taiwan Provincial Teachers' College, and became an important center for cultivating music teachers. In 1955, it was again renamed to Taiwan Provincial Normal University; at this time, Er-hua Xiao from Fujian Music College, Ou Kang and Cui-lun Dai from Shanghai Music College (the predecessor of Shanghai Conservatory of Music), and others joined its faculty, and redesigned the music educational system of Taiwan. At the same time, Taiwanese musicians who had traveled to Japan for study, such as Ci-mei Gao and Cai-xiang Zhang, also joined the faculty after their return to Taiwan, resulting in the school's music educational curriculum reflecting the principles of two different systems. At the time, Taiwan's art music was greatly influenced by post-romantic music from the West. This was particularly distinct in the works of the alumni of Taiwan Provincial Normal University, including Tyzen Hsiao, Tsang-houei Hsu, and others.

The National Taiwan Academy of the Arts (the predecessor of today's National Taiwan University of Arts) was established in Banqiao, Taipei County (now New Taipei City), in 1955. Through the effort of the successive directors of its music program, including vocalist Xue-yong Shen, Wei-liang Shih (1926–1977), and others, numerous professional performers and composers received trainings that blended the Western theory of composition together with elements of traditional Chinese music, and used Western composition techniques to reinterpret the classics of Chinese literature. For example, The Song of Pipa for a female soloist and orchestra, composed by Wei-liang Shih, adapted the poem of the same title written by poet Juyi Bai of the Tang dynasty as its lyrics. This modern music work combined the Chinese pentatonic scale and western polyphony and atonality. It was premiered at Taipei's Armed Forces Cultural Center in 1968, with soprano Sai-yun Liu as the female vocalist, and Cui-lun Dai conducting the Taiwan Provincial Symphony Orchestra (predecessor of today's National Taiwan Symphony Orchestra) as accompaniment. This piece was known to be the late composer's favorite of his works. Other alumni of the National Taiwan Academy of Arts included musicians Tai-xiang Li, Chang-fa Yu, and others.

Composers of this generation were deeply influenced by the heritage of Chinese culture, with deep cultural literacy and awareness of local trends, enabling them to excel at combining Western music and classic Chinese literature together. For example, Shui-long Ma portrayed his hometown Keelung in his Suite Taiwan for Piano Solo. In his later Bamboo Flute Concerto, the piece which brought him fame as a composer, he combined the Chinese pentatonic scale and the orchestration of Western music together, not only showcasing the performance skills of the bamboo flutist, but also bringing Taiwanese music to a whole new level. The Bamboo Flute Concerto was selected as the theme song of the Broadcasting Corporation of China based on its reputation as a monumental Taiwanese musical piece. This piece was followed by Shui-long Ma's symphonic suite Xiang Yu and His Concubine, a work based on the history of the Chu-Han Contention in ancient China. Originally written in the form of a singspiel with spoken dialogue, Ma used traditional Chinese instruments in place of the vocals. For example, the bass part for the character Xiang Yu is replaced by the suona, the soprano part for Consort Yu is replaced by the nanhu, and the tenor part for Liu Bang is replaced by the pipa. Combining Chinese traditional instruments and a Western orchestra, this symphonic suite weaves exchanges between these three traditional instruments throughout. Xiang Yu and His Concubine won the Best Art Music Album award at the 26th Golden Melody Awards for Traditional Arts and Music.

The music conservatory serves as a base for cultivating musical talents, while the establishment of musical organizations founded by patrons supports a variety of musical events. The Association of Taiwanese Culture was established by Taiwan's elite Hsien-tang Lin, the scholar Mosei Lin, politician Mi-chien Yu, and others in 1946 for actively promoting musical activities. Musicians returning from their studies in Japan, including Chih-yuan Kuo, Chuan-sheng Lu, and Erh Lin, and others, were fervent in creating new pieces for the events held by this society. However, during this period of post-war reconstruction, these events were unsuccessful in attracting attention and support.

In 1955, Chih-yuan Kuo wrote the Symphonic Variation in Taiwanese Style for Orchestra, the first orchestral piece by a Taiwanese composer. With themes celebrating Taiwan's beautiful scenery and folk music, the work was premiered by Taiwan Provincial Symphony Orchestra. In 1972, Kuo wrote the Concertino for Piano and String Orchestra, the first piano concerto by a Taiwanese composer.

Students studying composition at Taiwan Provincial Normal University and the National Taiwan Academy of Arts received a great deal of exposure to Chinese traditional music, operas, and works written by Chinese composers from the first half of the 20th century, such as art songs by Tzu Huang, Yuen-ren Chao, Bao-chen Li, and Xue'an Liu, and others, in their tutelage led by musicians from mainland China. After these students graduated, some taught music at schools, such as Yen Lu, while some worked as researchers or orchestral musicians in the Taiwan Provincial Symphony Orchestra, including Loong-hsing Wen, Hsuan-wen Chang, and Deh-ho Lai, etc. In their spare time, these graduates collected and analyzed Taiwanese folk music, and blended it with Western composition theory to develop a new form of contemporary art music belonging to Taiwan.

The Division of Research for the Taiwan Provincial Symphony Orchestra was established by its former director Wei-liang Shih in 1972. He invited several alumni of the National Taiwan Academy of Arts and composers returning from abroad to join this division, including Deh-ho Lai, Loong-hsing Wen, Chang-fa Yu, among others. These young composers founded the Music Society of the Sunflower in 1967. In addition to the composers mentioned above, Mau-liang Chen, Chin-tang Shen, and Shui-long Ma, also alumni of the National Taiwan Academy of Arts, were also members of this society.

=== Private music organizations ===
Tsang-houei Hsu, who studied abroad in France before returning to Taiwan to teach at Taiwan Provincial Normal University, founded the Assembly for Composition in 1961. This group did not have fixed members, with Tsang-houei Hsu inviting different composers to write pieces for each concert. In 1961, New Music in First Performance, an orchestra for the performance of modern music, was founded by the violinist Chang-guo Deng, Japanese pianist Anna Azusa Fujita, Hsien-liang Koo, Tsang-houei Hsu, Kuo-huang Han, and others in order to perform modern music both in Taiwan and overseas. Other important groups during this period included the Chiang Lang Music Assembly and The Five. They held concerts to present their own works as well as conduct international exchanges.

The Asian Composers League - National Committee and The Composers’ Association of the Republic of China (ACL-ROC) was co-founded by Tsang-houei Hsu, Yoshiro Nabeshima (Japan), Yoshiro Irino (Japan), Sheng-shih Lin (Hong Kong), and Un-young La (Korea) in 1973 in order to exchange ideas about music with other Asian composers. Through this organized system for carrying out international exchange of contemporary art music, development of Taiwan's contemporary art music expanded greatly. Frequent and regular cross-cultural exchange also helped improve the composing standard for Taiwan's art music significantly and many notable composers arose.

At the time, the art music of Taiwan, in addition to new musical styles that combined Chinese and Western music, also encompassed abstract musical styles influenced by Modernism. When Tsang-houei Hsu returned to Taiwan after his studies in France, he brought with him the latest contemporary music trends of Europe, including serialism music. Although this style was not widely accepted in Taiwan, his students at Taiwan Provincial Normal University and the National Taiwan Academy of Arts were influenced by this musical theory. Works written by Hwang-long Pan (1945- ) used this modern musical language, enhancing the sonority and ambiance of sound. Compared to works written by his contemporaries, Pan's compositions were more abstract. For example, his quartet for the clarinet, percussion, piano, and cello Labyrinth - promenade places great emphasis on mood and atmosphere. In recent years, Hwang-long Pan has worked closely with the Chai Found Music Workshop, an ensemble that focuses on the performance of contemporary art music in Taiwan. In addition to performing traditional Chinese music, the Chai Found Music Workshop also utilizes Chinese traditional instruments to perform contemporary art music. It has presented numerous works written by contemporary Taiwanese composers at many international contemporary art festivals.

=== Since 1980 ===
The development of Western art music in Taiwan primarily took place in educational institutions, both public and private. The earliest such music programs included those at Taiwan Provincial Normal University and the National Taiwan Academy of Arts, as well as Chinese Culture University (1962)¸ Shih Chien College of Home Economics (today's Shih Chien University, 1969), Soochow University (1972), Fu Jen Catholic University (1983), and the National Institute of the Arts (predecessor of today's Taipei National University of the Arts, 1982). After the 1980s, all the junior teachers colleges were restructured into teachers' colleges, allowing the founding of several departments and institutes of music. These new programs trained numerous music teachers for different types of schools and also promoted general enthusiasm for music. Around the same time, the United Experimental Orchestra (predecessor of the National Symphony Orchestra) and the National Chiang Kai-Shek Cultural Center (predecessor of the National Theater and Concert Hall) were established respectively in 1986 and 1987. Together, they held a series of concerts with many Taiwanese and overseas musicians invited to perform and commissioned new pieces from local composers. All of this contributed to the vigorous growth of musical activities in Taiwan. Musical talents flourished in large numbers and the standards for composition and performance shot up markedly. Leading musicians at the time included Hwang-long Pan, Shing-kwei Tzeng, Fang-long Ke, Nan-chang Chien, Shan-hua Chien, and Shu-si Chen.

At the suggestion of Dr. Robert Scholz, Taiwan began to send talented music students for pursuing further study abroad in the 1960s. The earliest students selected included pianists Pi-hsien Chen, Lina Yeh, and Tai-cheng Chen, among others, who went to Europe for their musical studies. After they graduated, some of them remained overseas, while others returned to Taiwan and devoted themselves to education. Several of these music talents have won awards in renowned international music competitions. Examples include pianist Siao-pei Yang, who won the third place in the Concours international d'exécution musicale de Genève in 1967; pianist Pi-hsien Chen, who won the first place in the Internationaler Musikwettbewerb der ARD in 1974; Nai-yuan Hu, who was the first-place winner of the Queen Elisabeth Music Competition in 1985; and Yu-chien Tseng, who won the second place in the violin section (in which first place was not awarded) of the International Tchaikovsky Competition in 2015. As for conductors, Helen Quach, Wen-pin Chien, Shao-chia Lü, Mei-ann Chen, and Tung-chieh Chuang are all well-known conductors in the international music scene that has brought Taiwan international prestige.

In 1990, composer Shui-long Ma launched the Spring and Autumn Music Collection, a platform for sponsoring aspiring composers, funded and organized by the Chew's Culture Foundation. Entrepreneur Andrew Chew supported this endeavor in acknowledgment of the dire need for more Taiwanese composers and the recognition that composers serve as the cornerstone of all artistic works. Theatrical as well as choreographic performances all need background music, with composers playing as vital a role as accompanists. The Spring and Autumn Music Collection launched its first concert in the spring of 1991, presenting the works of aspiring Taiwanese composers in their prime, such as Shu-si Chen, Shan-hua Chien, Kwang-i Ying, Hwei-lee Chang, Ming-chung Sheu, Shyh-ji Pan, and Yann-jong Hwang, with a variety of styles of music represented. The autumn concert held later the same year brought in veteran composers, such as Tsang-houei Hsu, Hwang-long Pan, Yen Lu, Ting-lien Wu, Nan-chang Chien, Shing-kwei Tzeng, and Hao Chang. They produced new works that blend Chinese culture with Western compositional techniques.

The difference between the spring and autumn concerts held by the Spring and Autumn Music Collection is that the spring concerts feature works by aspiring composers, while the autumn concerts focus on works by seasoned composers. As of 2016, the Spring and Autumn Music Collection may not hold concerts every year but the participating composers represent the development of Taiwan's Western art music scene. Many of the outstanding composers featured in the concerts have won prizes in the international composition competitions, for example, Jing Peng, Ming-hsiu Yen, Wei-chih Liu, Ching-meio Lin, Chiu-yu Chou, Shih-hui Chen, Yuan-chen Li, Chung-kun Hung, Tzyy-sheng Lee, and others.

As for the development of Western opera in Taiwan, the Taipei Symphony Orchestra (TSO, 1986 – 2003) produced one opera every year under the directorship of Felix Chiu-Sheng Chen. The operas primarily featured local vocalists with only a few internationally renowned vocalists invited to participate. Moreover, the staff in charge of stage production and backstage work was led by Taiwanese stagehands, administrators, and musicians. This system offered opportunities to local vocalists to showcase their talents and other art workers to develop the skills needed for handling the delicate and complicated work that goes into producing an opera.

The Taipei Opera Theater was established by professor and vocalist Dau-hsiong Tseng in 1973. Although not as large as the Taipei Symphony Orchestra in scale, the Taipei Opera Theater has performed many Western operatic masterpieces over the past 50 years. Both the quantity of performances and the production standards are on par with those produced by public orchestras and the theater serves as an important base for nurturing local opera singers and conductors alike. From Tai-li Chu in the past to the more recent Li-chin Huang, Keng Li, I-chiao Shih, Chia-fen Wu, Hanying Iaia Tso, Taiwan on the whole has raised many young and aspiring vocalists active onstage in many international opera houses.

Cloud Gate Dance Theater is also a major driving force in the Taiwanese composition scene. For example, Deh-ho Lai was commissioned by Hwai-min Lin, the founder of Cloud Gate Dancer Theater, to write the music for White Serpent Tale and The Dream of the Red Chamber. Shui-long Ma was also similarly commissioned for Liao Tian-ding. As for theatrical works, Kuei-ju Lin, a composer in her prime who has devoted herself to theatrical music production and is active in theatrical and art music circles, began her career as an undergraduate. After she received her Ph.D. degree in the United States and returned to Taiwan to teach, she collaborated with M.O.V.E. Theatre to design and host Dear John, which became one of five finalists for the twelfth Taishin Arts Award.

== Modern music ==
=== Pop and rock ===
In the mid-1970s a genre of popular music known as Taiwanese campus folk song appeared in the music scene of Taiwan. This music consisted of a fusion of elements from American folk rock and Chinese folk music, and was very popular throughout East Asia. Until the 1987 lifting of martial law, Taiwanese pop fell into two distinct categories. Hokkien pop was sung in a native dialect and was popular among older and working-class listeners; it was strongly influenced by Japanese enka. In contrast, Mandarin pop, due to the assimilation policy of the authoritarian Kuomintang regime (1945–1996) that suppressed Taiwanese languages and culture, appealed to younger listeners. Pan-Asian superstar Teresa Teng was originally from Taiwan and enjoyed immense popularity throughout the Sinophone world and beyond. By the mid-1980s, Taiwan's booming Mandarin language music industry was the source of around 90% of Mandopop sold in Southeast Asia.

By the early 1980s, Hokkien pop remained popular only among the older generations and working class; Mandopop had benefited from government promotion of Standard Chinese. After the lifting of martial law in 1987, local Taiwanese culture was allowed to flourish, and major changes came to the content and social status of Hokkien pop songs. The most popular Taiwanese female singer to date is Jody Chiang, who has numerous Hokkien albums dating from the early 1980s. Another famous singer in Taiwan also known for her ballads is Chen Ying-git.

With the resurgence of interest in native cultural identities starting in the late 1980s, a more distinct and modern form of Taiwanese pop formed. In 1989, a group of musicians called the Blacklist Studio released Song of Madness on Rock Records. Blending hip hop, rock and other styles, the album focused on the issues concerning everyday, modern people. Building on Song of Madness' success, the following year saw Lin Chiang release Marching Forward, which kickstarted what became known as New Taiwanese Song. At the same time, the Hakka Ethnic Movement was also picking up, with many relevant publications. Notably, Sheng-Chih Wu (吳盛智) released his first Hakka album, Missed, in 1981, which has inspired many Hakka musicians since. Later on, Min-Heng Tu (涂敏恆) released "True Hakka," and it is now considered the "national anthem of the Hakka."

Pop stars of the 1990s included Wu Bai, Chang Chen-yue, Jimmy Lin, and Emil Wakin Chau. A-mei, who has been referred to as the "Queen of Mandopop", rose to prominence, alongside other pop idols such as Show Lo, Jay Chou, Jolin Tsai and girl group S.H.E. Hokkien pop singer Jeannie Hsieh departed from traditional Hokkien ballads with dance songs. In rock music, Mayday was a popular band in the late 1990s. In the latest generation of pop music in Taiwan, singing reality shows such as One Million Star and Super idol brought ordinary people to fame, such as Jam Hsiao, Yoga Lin, Aska Yang, Lala Hsu, and William Wei.

The 1990s and early 2000s also saw the emergence of bands and artists of more diverse genres, such as Sodagreen, Deserts Chang, Cheer Chen, who have achieved commercial success and brought the new "indie" era of Taiwanese pop music. Other indie bands include Your Woman Sleep With Others, Labor Exchange Band, Chairman, Sugar Plum Ferry, deca joins, Backquarter, Fire EX, 8mm Sky, Seraphim, and ChthoniC. The annual Formoz Festival, Spring Scream, and Hohaiyan Rock Festival are representative gatherings within Taiwan's indie scene. Of these, Formoz Festival is notable for its international draw, with foreign artists such as Yo La Tengo, Moby, Explosions in the Sky, and Caribou headlining the event, while Spring Scream is the largest local band event, and Hohaiyan draws a mixed crowd of beach side party-goers and music appreciators alike.

Other Taiwanese popular singers/bands include Rainie Yang, Da Mouth, Amber Kuo, A-Lin, Magic Power and much more. The popular culture of the Taiwanese people has also influenced Chinese-speaking populations in other places such as Mainland China, Malaysia and Singapore.

=== Metal ===
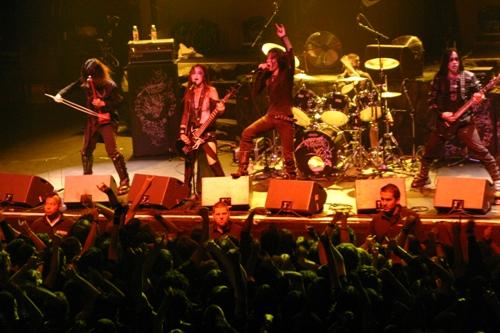
Chthonic

There are hundreds of metal bands active in Taiwan. Bands such as Chthonic and Seraphim have drawn more attention to the metal scene in Taiwan, with Chthonic in particular attracting attention overseas, performing at European festivals such as Bloodstock Open Air.

=== Techno ===
Taiwan has a small techno and house music scene centered on Taipei. Most DJs and artists do it on the side rather than as their primary job. Performances often mix music with visual art.

Taiwan's first organized rave was held in 1995.

== See also ==
- Performing arts in Taiwan
- Bureau of Audiovisual and Music Industry Development
- Enka
- Hohaiyan Rock Festival
- Hsu Tsang-Houei
- J-pop
- Kaohsiung Music Center
- List of best-selling albums in Taiwan
- List of Taiwanese singers
- Mandopop
- Metal bands of Taiwan
- Music of China
- Music of Hong Kong
- Red Envelope Club
- Hakkapop
- Taiwanese Indigenous pop music
- Taiwanese wave
- Tyzen Hsiao
- Taiwan International Cello Festival

== Bibliography ==
- Wang, Ying-fen (2000). "Taiwan: From Innocence to Funny Rap". In Broughton, Simon; Ellingham, Mark (eds.). World Music. Volume 2, Latin and North America, Caribbean, India, Asia and Pacific. London: Rough Guides. pp. 235–40. ISBN 9781858286365.
