= Chen Ming-chang =

Taiwanese musician

Chen Ming-chang 陳明章
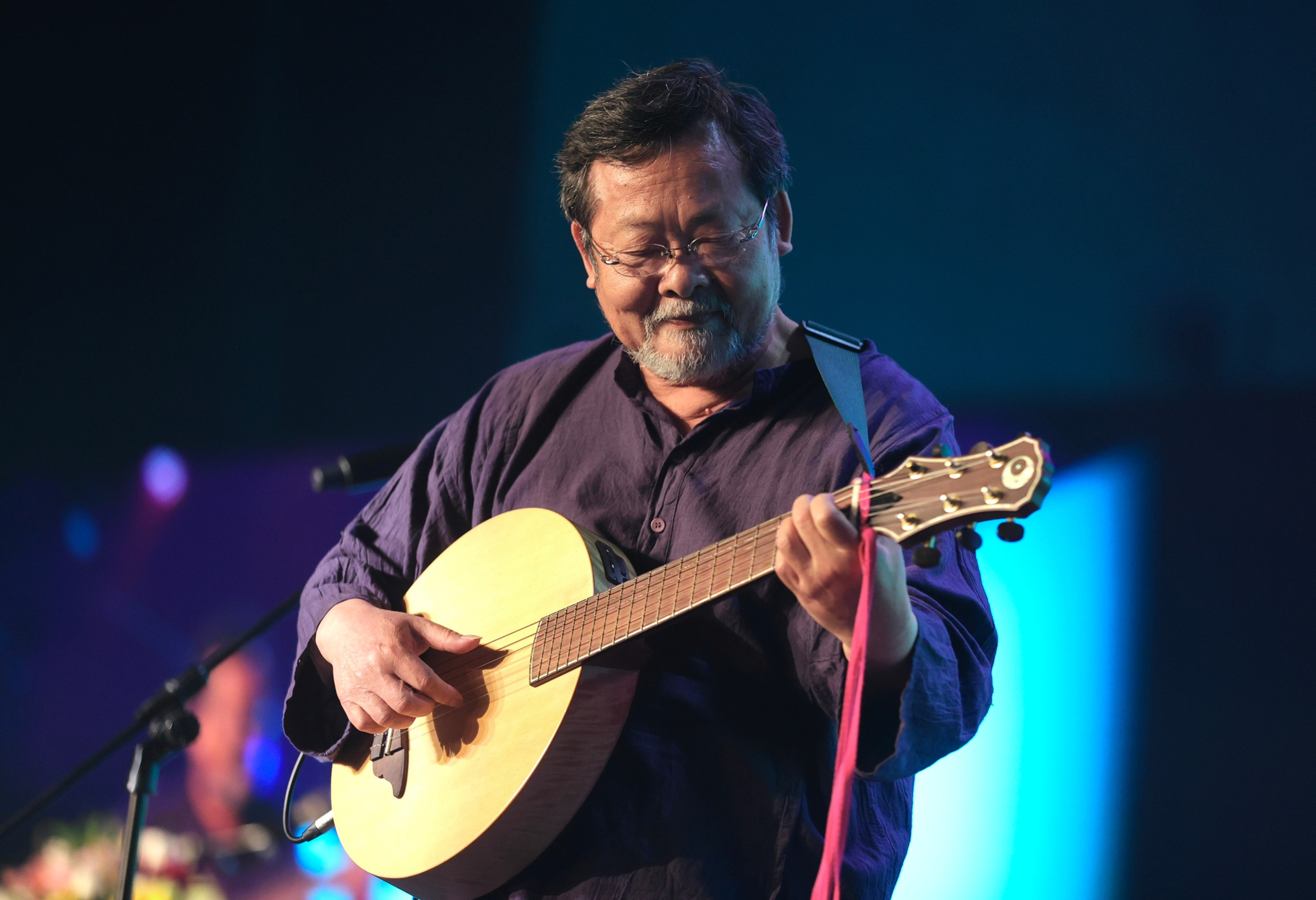

Background information
- Born: 1956 (age 68–69); Yangmingshan Administrative Bureau, Taiwan
- Genres: folk
- Instrument(s): guitar, Taiwanese yueqin

Chinese name
- Traditional Chinese: 陳明章
Transcriptions
Standard Mandarin
- Hanyu Pinyin: Chén Míngzhāng
Southern Min
- Hokkien POJ: Tân Bêng-chiong
- Tâi-lô: Tân Bîng-tsiong

Chen Ming-chang (陳明章) (Chinese: 陳明章; Pe̍h-ōe-jī: Tân Bêng-chiong, born July 4, 1956) is a Taiwanese folk singer, guitarist, Taiwanese yueqin player, composer, and producer born in Beitou. He is known for writing scores for the Hou Hsiao-Hsien films Dust in the Wind (1985) and The Puppetmaster (1993), as well as for songs such as "She Is Our Darling" (伊是咱的寶貝, 1993) and "Wandering to Tamsui" (流浪到淡水, 1995). He is stylistically known for singing primarily in Taiwanese Hokkien, incorporating traditional styles and instruments into his music, as well as songs that represent the Taiwanese underclass.

== History ==
=== Early life ===
Chen Ming-chang was born in 1956 in Beitou Village, Yangmingshan Administrative Bureau (now Beitou District in Taipei). Chen Ming-chang's first musical instrument was his older brother's guitar, which his mother bought for 2700 NTD as a reward for his high school admission. His brother barely used it and left it for Ming-chang, then in his 2nd year of middle school, to play with.

In his youth, Chen Ming-chang hoped to become a baseball player. He was not very studious and in 1972, he was admitted to Fuxing Senior High School in Beitou and played first base for the high school team. He dreamed of going to the United States to play in the MLB. Neglecting his homework to practice baseball, it took him four years rather than the usual three to complete high school.

Music was just a hobby for Chen Ming-chang until his third year in high school, when he realized that despite being slow at reading music, he had a particular sensitivity toward sound and in particular could quickly transcribe any song that he heard. He began to experiment with Western-style music and joined his school's guitar club. By his account. he would often practice from 9 P.M. to 4 or 5 A.M. every night and then sleep into the afternoon before leaving for school. To avoid demerits he would sneak into the military instructor's office and doctor the roll call sheet before going to the guitar club.

==== Military service and afterwards ====
The 70s in Taiwan saw the beginning of the campus folk song movement, and it was during this time that Chen Ming-chang's natural musical talents were stirred. After graduating from high school, he formed a musical group called the Wooden Guitar Chorus (木吉他合唱團), which consisted of his friends Jonathan Lee, Chang Bing-hui (張炳輝), Cheng Wen-kui (鄭文魁), Hu Chao-yu (胡昭宇), Chen Yung-Yu (陳永裕), Chiang Hsueh-shih (江學世), and others.

It was then that Chen began to experiment with composing music, as his singing was not good enough for the group, according to the album notes to his 1990 album An Afternoon Drama. In a 2002 interview, he said that the group would practice singing during their studies at Minghsin University of Science and Technology, but since he was serving his mandatory military service at the time he couldn't participate. After he was discharged, they already had two guitarists and had no need for another. To make a living, he worked as a merchant selling a variety of goods, such as clothing, watches and pianos.

=== Rise of Taiwanese consciousness (1980s) ===
In 1982, at age 26, Chen Ming-chang's father suffered from a stroke, and he went back to Beitou to help take care of him as well as help his mother run their jewelry store. Two years later, when his younger brother finished his military service, Ming-chang decided he would try his hand at music again. His supportive mother and sister bought him a piano and a four-track recorder. They converted the fourth floor of their house into a recording studio, where Ming-chang would teach guitar in the evenings after working in the family shop.

It was during this time that Chen began to think about the question: "what is Taiwanese music?" The question was spurred by his discovery of the music of Chen Da, a Taiwanese language folk musician representative of Hengchun. Hearing Chen Da's music made Chen Ming-chang realize that his music lacked "a feeling for this land and a reflection on our local culture" and gave him a resolve to make music that belonged to Taiwan. It was around this time that Chen also learned about the 228 Incident, tearfully related to him by a drunken old man while he was on an errand in Keelung for his side business selling orchids. Since Taiwan was still under martial law at the time, Ming-chang's parents had never mentioned it to him.

Not long after, Chen Ming-chang collaborated with Chen Ming-yu (陳明瑜) and wrote his first Taiwanese language song, "The Chinese Cross to Taiwan" (唐山過臺灣), a folk song about how early Chinese settlers had first crossed the Taiwan Strait by boat. He employed more traditional Taiwanese sounds such as the pentatonic scale. In a later interview he noted that he felt that he could only express his deepest feelings through Taiwanese, not Mandarin.

==== Work with Hou Hsiao-hsien ====
After establishing his musical studio, a friend of his gave one of his cassette recordings to Hou Hsiao-hsien. After half a year, Hou's assistant gave him a call and asked if he write the musical score for Dust in the Wind, which would go on to win a best music award at the Three Continents Festival. Hou would also ask Chen to write the score for The Puppetmaster in 1993, for which he won the award for best score at the Film Fest Gent in Belgium. According to Chen, it was this prize that gave him some assurance that he could make a living writing music.

==== Blacklist Studio: Protest songs in Taiwanese ====
In 1987, martial law was lifted in Taiwan after nearly 40 years, and Taiwan entered a new era. At the time, Chen Ming-chang was working as a manufacturing assistant at Four Seas Records (四海唱片) along with Wang Ming-hui (王明輝), Chen Chu-hui (陳主惠) and Lin Wei-je (林煒哲), where they talked about working on something themselves. According to Chen:

In the past the government prohibited people from speaking [in Taiwanese]; if you accidentally let some split in school they would make you stand with a placard reading "no dialects allowed." In this kind of education where students study 5,000 years of [Chinese] history, how many of them are familiar with [Taiwanese] history? The little details about Taiwan?

They formed the group Blacklist Studio and in 1989 released alternative Taiwanese rock album "Songs of Madness" (抓狂歌) with Rock Records. Each song reflected a social reality of the time: "Taxi" (計程車) and "Dad's Words" (阿爸的話) were about everyday life for the people, and the song "A-Tsao Democracy" (民主阿草) was a political satire about the "Thousand Year National Assembly" (referring to the fact that most of the seats in the National Assembly, representing various provinces in China, were essentially made to be permanent members). Beyond reflecting the social situation of the time, the band opened new possibilities for Taiwanese language music by experimenting with styles such as rap, folk, and rock, as opposed to the sentimental ballads which had typified Taiwanese music in the past.

The album was released close to election season, and the Kuomintang prohibited its broadcast. Though it was praised by critics, it was not a commercial success. Later, Chen Ming-chang would say: "We were prepared to be arrested or taken away but we still wanted to see whether the lifting of martial law was real or not."

=== Rise in popularity (1990-present) ===
In 1990, Chen Ming-chang's music began to grow in popularity. He released two albums that year: Live Works 1 (現場作品(1)) and An Afternoon Drama (下午的一齣戲), and Live Works 2 in the following year. These works were all critically acclaimed in the music industry.

In 1992, after an island-wide tour of college campuses, Chen took a break from his solo career to write music for The Puppetmaster and other films. He felt that his music had become tired, and that it was easier to write film scores since the ideas were already in place. In 1993, he wrote songs for events hosted by the Garden of Hope Foundation to rescue child prostitutes. His experiences at these events led him to write the popular song "She is Our Darling", which became the anthem for the 228 Hand-In-Hand Rally in 2004, and was also played at the end of the 326 March To Protect Taiwan (三二六護台灣大遊行) in response to the passage of the Anti-Secession Law in China.

That year, he also suffered a spinal injury, which Chen has attributed to his alcohol use. He had long seen alcohol as a source of creative inspiration, drinking late into the night while working and not rising until the afternoon. In 1993 he suffered a spinal injury and quit drinking while in the hospital, but suffered from anxiety and panic attacks afterwards which made it difficult for him to think. During this time he would go to the mountain temples in Beitou every day to listen to Buddhist scripture readings.

==== "Wandering to Tamsui" and the Danshui Wandering Minstrels ====
Because of his illness, Chen Ming-chang stopped writing music for two years until 1995, when he wrote popular and award-winning "Wandering to Tamsui" (流浪到淡水), which was inspired by the lifestyles of wandering minstrels Chin Man-wang (金門王) and Lee Ping-huei (李炳輝). He founded a musical group called the Danshui Wandering Minstrels in 1997. The members of the band all had day jobs: the guitarist A-Chang (阿昌) was a judicial scrivener, bassist Steve (史帝夫) was an American lawyer, the drummer Little Huang (小黃) was a manager at a medicine factory, Huai-yi (懷一) worked in advertising, and Chen Ming-chang was growing orchids. Only their manager A-liang (阿亮) worked for the group full-time. They agreed that to not give up their day jobs so that playing music would remain a fun hobby for them. The group practiced on Saturdays and performed all across Taiwan.

=== Recent career (2000-present) ===
In 2009, Chen founded the Taiwanese Yueqin Folksong Association (台灣月琴民謠協會), which has hosted an annual four-week yueqin folk song festival at the Beitou Hot Springs Museum during the Mid-Autumn Festival since 2011. The group promotes broader interest for the Taiwanese yueqin via outreach to schools, community colleges and community centers. The organization also conducts exchanges with Japanese shamisen players.

In 2010, he composed and produced Huang Fei's hit single "Chase Chase Chase" (追追追). He wrote the score for the Zero Chou film Ripples of Desire in 2012, which prominently features the Taiwanese yueqin.

On July 27, 2019, Chen Ming-chang released a single titled "Hong Kong! Freedom" (香港！自由) on YouTube in support of the anti-extradition bill protests in Hong Kong. The song had two versions, one in Taiwanese and the other in Cantonese. He also participated in a free public concert in Liberty Square that November in support of the Hong Kong protests.

== Influences and associated acts ==
Chen Ming-chang's music was deeply influenced by that of Chen Da, a Taiwanese folk singer from Hengchun. In particular, it was Chen Da's music that caused Chen Ming-chang to decide to primary sing in Taiwanese Hokkien, his mother tongue. In the liner notes to his album An Afternoon Play, he recalls a time when he saw Chen Da perform in a Western-style restaurant in Taipei, and noted the contrast between the musician's loose-fitting suit and the lifestyles of the steak-eating audience members.

He has also cited influences from various traditional operas, such as Taiwanese opera, which his father would often take him to see as a child. He has been cited for inventing a style of guitar playing that mimicked the sounds of the beiguan, nanguan and Taiwanese yueqin. Chen has also cited aboriginal influences in his music from when he spent time in aboriginal villages in Taitung and Hualien.

His music was also influence from seeing Nakasi performers in neighboring Beitou hotels starting at an early age, as well as the open air theater performances his grandfather would take him to see. Performances of traditional operas and plays happened almost every day in his neighborhood, including beiguan, nanguan, Taiwanese opera, and glove puppetry, and as a result he was steeped in traditional Taiwanese culture ever since his youth. His mother would also sing old Taiwanese songs growing up, passing the stylistic tradition to him orally. His father also often took him to glove puppetry shows, where the action, puppets and songs left a deep impression on a young Ming-chang.

In the past, he would borrow musicians from Wu Bai's band China Blue. Since the early 2000s, he has also been known for collaborating with, as well as producing and composing songs for singer Huang Fei.

== Awards ==
- In 1987, Dust in the Wind became the first Taiwanese film to win an international prize for film score at the Three Continents Festival in Nantes, France.
- In 1993, Chen won the prize for best score for The Puppetmaster at the Film Fest Gent in Belgium.
- In 1995, he would write the score for the Hirokazu Koreeda film Maborosi, which won the Best Music Award at the 1995 Mainichi Film Awards in Japan.
- In 1998, he won the Best Composer award at the 9th Golden Melody Awards in 1998 for the song "Wandering to Tamsui". The Taipei County Government deemed that the song was representative of the unique qualities of Danshui (Tamsui), and installed the lyrics on a plaque on Tamsui Lover's Bridge on Tamsui Fisherman's Wharf.
- In 1999, he wrote the score for the Lin Cheng-sheng film March of Happiness, which won the Best Music Award at the Asia Pacific Film Festival and was nominated for the Best Music Award at the 36th Golden Horse Awards.

== Discography ==
- Blacklist Studio (黑名單工作室), 1989
- Live Works 1 (現場作品(1)), 1990
- An Afternoon Drama (下午的一齣戲), 1990
- Live Works 2 (現場作品(2)), 1991
- We Are Not A People Without Feeling (阮不是一個無感情的人), 1995
- Do Not Ask Our Name (勿問阮的名), 1999
- The Last Car From Su'ao (蘇澳來ㄟ尾班車), 2002
- "She Is Our Darling" (伊是咱的寶貝), single, 2004
- Beloved Old Station (心愛的老車站), 2005
- Lin Cheng-sheng's Film, Chen Ming-chang's Music (林正盛的電影‧陳明章的音樂) 2005
- Hou Hsiao-hsein's Film, Chen Ming-chang's Music: Dust in the Wind (侯孝賢的電影‧陳明章的音樂：戀戀風塵), 2005
- Hirokazu Koreeda's Film, Chen Ming-chang's Music: Maborosi (是枝裕和的電影‧陳明章的音樂：幻之光), 2005
- The Whales, Paulonia Flower Bride (海尪·油桐花新娘), 2006
- A Pile of Guitars (一堆吉他), 2006
- Shaking the Mountains and Rivers (撼山河), 2017
- "Freedom! Hong Kong" (香港！自由), single, 2019

== See also ==
- New Taiwanese Song movement
- Chen Da (singer)
- Hou Hsiao-hsien
- Blacklist Studio
