= LTK Commune =

Taiwanese band

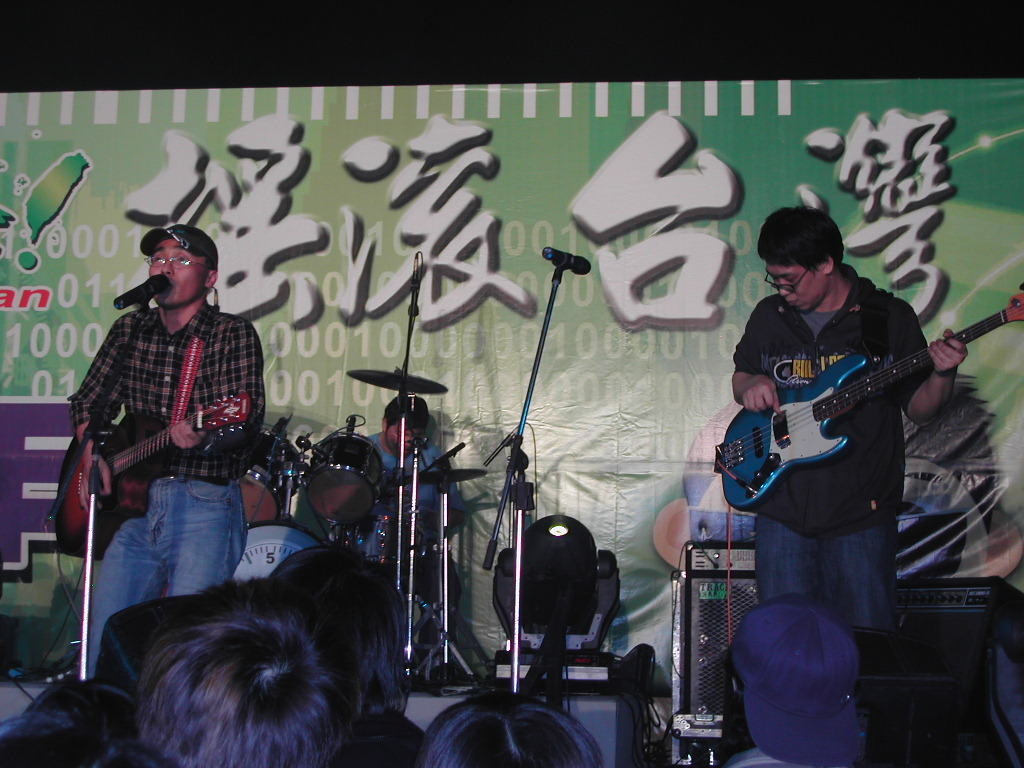

Background information
- Origin: Taiwan
- Genres: Punk rock; Alternative rock
- Years active: 1989–2020
- Members: Ke Jen-chien; Su Wei; Chiang Lee-ping; Chen Chun-an; Huang Nai-yi

Chinese name
- Traditional Chinese: 濁水溪公社
Transcriptions

LTK Commune (aka LTK, Taiwanese: Lô-chúi-khoe Kong-siā 濁水溪公社) is a well-known Taiwanese "underground" band founded in 1989. Their music has been variously described as having elements of punk, rock, nakasi, Taiwanese folk songs. In recent years band members have self-consciously applied the label "Taik" (from Taiwanese + -k ending, as in punk, rock) to their music – a reference to the Taiwanese Taike (Trad.: 台客) subculture.

The LTK stands for "Loh Tsui Kweh", an idiosyncratic spelling (in Taiwanese) of the name of the Choshui River in Taiwan, one that evokes nativist sentiments.

The two guitar players – Tsai Hai-en (蔡海恩) and Ke Jen-chien (柯仁堅) – share lead vocals. Both attended National Taiwan University but left school early. Between the two of them they have driven the band's evolution. The critic Malaite attributes the group's early grunge influence to Tsai. In addition to Western influences, both of them are, in their own ways, steeped in local, traditionally working class genres. There is also a bass player and a drummer.

LTK Commune's earlier music echoes the island's protest movements of the early 1990s. Earlier themes have consciously reflected environmentalist concerns and anti-authoritarian sentiments. With the decline of street protests and the onset of political liberalization, socially conscious themes have become less foregrounded. The band unabashedly supports Taiwan independence.

Their songs often express the frustration of the Taiwanese working class male. Unapologetically sexual or scatological references and vulgar language are found in some songs, a characteristic embraced by the fans but found outrageous by some critics. Some critics detect a streak of male chauvinism, most notably in the song "Rape, Murder"; others consider the song as a study of the perverse psyche of a rapist-murderer.

Much of the lyrics are in the native Taiwanese language, a choice consistent with the language's working class base, as well as the anti-Kuomintang Opposition culture. Spoken monologues reminiscent of traditional melodrama (such as Budaixi, Taiwanese opera) are a favored device in their narratives.

LTK Commune's live performances are noted for their spontaneity and engagement with the crowd.
