= 2022 Taichung First High Senior School incident =

On 11 March 2022, a verbal dispute broke out between music teacher Lu and four first-year students, including a student surnamed Chen, at Taichung Municipal Taichung First Senior High School in North District, Taichung, Taiwan. The conflict arose after Lu criticized the contents of the group's classroom presentation and the students disagreed with her comments, causing the teacher to become emotionally agitated.Part of the incident was recorded by a classmate surnamed Chi and uploaded online, sparking nationwide discussion.

== Incident ==
=== Parties involved ===
Teacher Lu, who taught music at Taichung First Senior High School, had more than thirty years of teaching experience. The school's administrative staff described her as a conscientious and rigorous teacher. Tsai Ling-hui, a professor in the Department of Traditional Music at Taipei National University of the Arts, wrote on Facebook that Lu had actively coordinated annual visits by the department's teaching team to Taichung First Senior High School to provide students with learning resources on nanguan and beiguan music.

The school also stated that Lu was strict in disciplining students. Previous teacher–student disputes had occurred, although neither the K–12 Education Administration of the Ministry of Education nor the Taichung City Government Education Bureau had forwarded any public complaints to the school. Students considered Lu to be highly opinionated. Alumni and current students had nicknamed her "Bai Yun (Taiwanese entertainer)", after the Taiwanese comedian of the same stage name. In 2020, she reportedly became upset when students addressed her by the nickname during class, angrily reprimanded them, and threatened to deduct points from their grades.

Student Chen, who prepared the presentation in question, was regarded by his peers as diligent and had spent Saturdays working on the project.

=== Course of the conflict ===
In March 2022, Lu assigned several first-year classes to give group presentations on the theme of Chinese musical instruments.

One group, consisting of Chen and three other students, included material on nanguan and beiguan, traditional performing arts of Fujian and Taiwan, as well as the Taiwanese funeral ritual known as "spirit-guiding chant". Part of their slideshow used internet memes and Image macro.

On the morning of 11 March, during the music class held from 8:00 a.m. to 10:00 a.m., the group uploaded its presentation to the classroom computer. After reviewing the slides, Lu concluded that parts of the content fell outside the topics previously assigned. In particular, nanguan and beiguan were second-year subjects rather than part of the first-year curriculum. Lu instructed the students to delete the material, reducing the planned 30–40 minute presentation to approximately 17 minutes.

Chen argued that:

- He had invested the most effort into those sections and hoped they could be retained;
- The teacher had never explicitly stated that the report should be limited to textbook content and therefore should not require the material to be removed.

For these reasons, Chen asked Lu to reverse her decision, but she refused. Lu also objected to the use of internet memes in the presentation，featuring Wang Leehom rather than Bai Yun, and reprimanded the students.

Because the remaining content no longer met the original requirements, Chen began reading directly from the textbook. At that point, Lu ordered the students to leave the podium and continued scolding them. After calming down, however, she still allowed the four students to finish their presentation.

As Lu became increasingly emotional, student Chi began recording part of the exchange on his mobile phone in order to protect his classmates' interests. Lu initially demanded that the recording stop and that the footage be deleted, but later withdrew the request. Chi uploaded the video to YouTube, where it received more than 100,000 views within a day.

Former Taoyuan City councilor Wang Hao-yu claimed on Facebook that Lu became upset after the students played music related to the funeral ritual and used a meme featuring comedian Baiyun. Chi, who recorded the incident, refuted the claim and clarified that the meme had actually featured singer Wang Leehom. Lu herself later denied that the meme had been the reason for her emotional outburst.

=== Aftermath ===
After Chi released the video, the dispute attracted nationwide attention. On the morning of 12 March, Taichung First Senior High School issued a statement emphasizing that student welfare would be its top priority. Later that day, Chi and four classmates held a press interview, claiming that the school had initially focused on asking students to remove the video rather than providing support. According to Chi, both his homeroom teacher and guidance counselor criticized his recording in a sarcastic tone and warned him that filming the incident might violate the law.

Chi and several classmates called on the school to replace Lu, whom they regarded as unfit for teaching. They also relayed Chen's opinion that the public should not treat the teacher's emotional outburst as a joke and instead focus on issues such as students' autonomy in presentations and teacher–student communication.

The school planned to hold a meeting on 14 March to clarify the circumstances of the incident and determine how to proceed. It also announced that a School Incident Review Committee would discuss Lu's suitability for teaching.

Following mediation on 14 March, Lu admitted that she had failed to control her emotions and expressed willingness to apologize to the students. Chen and his group subsequently stated that they would no longer request her removal.

== Public reactions ==
=== Views on the dispute over the presentation content ===
The Taichung City Government Education Bureau[b] instructed Taichung First Senior High School to promptly determine why there had been a discrepancy between teachers and students regarding their understanding of the presentation requirements. Huang Chien-hao, a Taichung City councilor[c] and alumnus of the school, argued that special classes such as mathematics and science gifted programs at the school often teach beyond the standard curriculum schedule. He maintained that exceeding the scope of classroom content should not be used as grounds to reject students' work, nor should students' autonomous learning be restricted.

Educators, including Chen Chien-ming of Chung Ming High School, argued that students should not be criticized for going beyond the classroom syllabus. They noted that under contemporary educational trends and the implementation of Taiwan's 2019 Curriculum Guidelines for 12-Year Basic Education, teaching and learning need not be confined to rigid boundaries.

=== Views on the teacher's disciplinary methods ===
Following the incident, the Education Bureau instructed the school to prioritize students' rights and psychological well-being, and stated that it would supervise teachers in adopting positive disciplinary practices and rational discussion.Taichung City councilor Lai Chia-wei expressed hope that teachers would avoid authoritarian disciplinary attitudes that might discourage students from pursuing independent learning.

Chen Chien-ming, Director of Academic Affairs at Taichung Municipal Chungming Senior High School and deputy secretary-general of the Taichung Senior High School Curriculum Development Center, stated that the incident demonstrated the students' high degree of initiative.He argued that teachers should persuade students through reason and address issues objectively rather than resorting to coercive or high-pressure methods, and that emotionally charged language should not be used to question students.

Writer Hsu Mei-yi expressed regret over the music teacher's emotional reaction and praised student Chen for maintaining a clear and rational explanation of his views despite facing unequal power relations and harsh criticism.

=== Views on whether the student's recording violated the law ===
Psychiatrist Shen Cheng-nan believed that student Chi's recording might have violated the law. Attorney Tang Kuang-yi stated that if the recording involved secretly recording a person's non-public activities without legitimate cause, it could constitute illegal recording, a type of offense against privacy.

Li Shan-chih, director of the Legal Affairs Bureau of the Taichung City Government, argued that because the incident occurred in a classroom, which he regarded as a public setting, and because the dispute between the teacher and students was conducted openly, the requirement of a "non-public activity" necessary for a privacy offense was not met. Attorney Lin Shih-min likewise stated that the student's purpose in recording was to preserve evidence and protect his rights, which constituted a legitimate reason and therefore did not satisfy the requirement of "without cause" under the offense.

Whether the student's use of a mobile phone violated the Ministry of Education's Guidelines on the Use of Mobile Devices on Campuses Below Senior High School Level also became a matter of debate. The Taichung City Government Education Bureau responded that teachers should first explain the rules governing mobile phone use. However, if a teacher is suspected of violating laws or regulations, students should not be prohibited from using mobile phones to collect evidence.
