= Wang Xinxin =

Wang Xinxin is the name of:

- Wang Xinxin (musician) (born 1965), Chinese-born performer of nanguan music
- Wang Xinxin (footballer) (born 1981), Chinese association footballer and coach
- Wang Xinxin (beach volleyball) (born 1998), Chinese beach volleyball player
