= Marching Forward =

Studio album by Lim Giong
- Released: December 7, 1990
- Genre: Rock, Pop
- Label: Rock Records
- Producer: Bobby Chen, Jonathan Lee, Terry Chou, Lo Hung Wu

Marching Forward (Chinese: 向前走) was the first Taiwanese Hokkien pop album released by Taiwanese singer Lim Giong and sold more than 400,000 copies. The album brought up rock music style, breaking the traditional melancholy style of Taiwanese pop music, and was regarded as one of the representative works of the new Taiwanese song movement. In addition to winning the Best Vocal Album Producer Award at the 3rd Golden Melody Awards, the album's eponymous title track, "Marching Forward," also won the Best Song of the Year Award.

== Recording ==
The album was recorded in 1989 and was co-produced by Bobby Chen and Jonathan Lee, with Lim Giong, Lee Cheng-Fan (Chinese: 李正帆), Kay Huang (Chinese: 黃韻玲), and Lo Hung Wu (Chinese: 羅紘武) as the main arrangers, and most of the lyric writing was done by Lim Giong. There are also Bobby Chen, Xu Xin-Yi (Chinese: 許心怡), Kuo Shu-Ling (Chinese: 郭婌齡), Lin Wei (Chinese: 林暐) and others who co-wrote some songs with Lim Giong. The album "Marching Forward" was officially released in vinyl and cassette versions on December 7, 1990, and compact disc version was released on January 17, 1991.

== Critical reception ==
According to music critic Weng Jiaming (Chinese: 翁嘉銘), "Marching Forward shows the conflicts, thoughts and emotional transformations of Taiwanese provincial children growing up in the countryside and adjusting to the city life. Although the criticism is not deep enough, at least it is a sincere expression of the young Taiwanese generation's experience of the reality of society."

== Track listing ==
Track	Title	Lyrics	Compose	Arrangement
1.	Ordinary people 平凡老百姓	Lim Giong	Lim Giong	Lee Cheng-Fan
2.	Marching Forward 向前走	Lim Giong	Lim Giong	Hung Wu
3.	No Vibration 未振未動	Lin Yu	Lim Giong & Lin Wei	Lee Cheng-Fan
4.	Letter To You 給你的信	Xu Xin-Yi	Lim Giong	Lee Cheng-Fan
5.	The Person In Dream 夢中人	Bobby Chen & Lim Giong & Kuo Shu-Ling	Bobby Chen	Kay Huang
6.	The Snack Vender 黑輪伯仔	Bobby Chen & Lim Giong	Bobby Chen & Lim Giong	Kay Huang
7.	Sky & Land 天和地	Lim Giong	Lim Giong	林強
8.	Shining 閃閃爍	Lim Giong	Lim Giong	Lee Cheng-Fan
9.	Lion In The Forest 深山林內有獅	Lim Giong	Lim Giong	Kay Huang
10.	This Matter 這款的代誌	Bobby Chen & Lim Giong	Bobby Chen & Lim Giong	Kay Huang

== Awards ==
Award Ceremony	Awards	Title	Result
The 3rd Golden Melody Awards	Song of the Year	Marching Forward - Lim Giong	Won
The 3rd Golden Melody Awards	Best Lyrics in Dialect Award	Marching Forward - Lim Giong	Nominated
The 3rd Golden Melody Awards	Best Lyrics in Dialect Award	Marching Forward - Lim Giong	Nominated
The 3rd Golden Melody Awards	Best Music Video	Marching Forward - Rock Records	Nominated
The 3rd Golden Melody Awards	Best Album Producer	Marching Forward - Bobby Chen, Jonathan Lee, Terry Chou, Lo Hung Wu	Won
