= New Formosa Band =

Taiwanese pop music ensemble

New Formosa Band 新寶島康樂隊
- Genres: New Taiwanese Song
- Years active: 1992–present
- Labels: Rock Records
- Members: Bobby Chen; Ayugo Huang; 阿VAN (Chen Shilong)

New Formosa Band (Chinese: 新寶島康樂隊) is a Taiwanese pop music ensemble. Its members include Bobby Chen and Ayugo Huang. The group was established in 1992 and are important musicians in the genres of Hakka and New Taiwanese Song. They released several albums in the 1990s which blended traditional Taiwanese folk music with pop elements. The group sang in both the traditional style of Taiwanese song (influenced by Japanese enka) and in a more modern pop style, as well as employing the dialect of the Hakka people. The group is also active supporters of politicians of Hakka descent.

== History ==
The first album released by the band in 1992, "The Passionate Man", received attention for having both Hakka and Chinese vocals. In 2012, New Formosa Band won the 23rd Golden Melody Award for Best Group for their song "Eight Feet Open".
