= Blacklist Studio =

Blacklist Studio 黑名單工作室
- Origin: Taiwan
- Genres: New Taiwanese Song, folk rock
- Years active: 1989–1996
- Past members: Chen Chu-hui; Chen Ming-chang; Lin Wei-je; Wang Ming-hui

Blacklist Studio (Chinese: 黑名單工作室) was a group of Taiwanese musicians who came together and released a ground-breaking album in 1989 called Songs of Madness (Chinese: 抓狂歌). Reportedly five years in the making, this work came out at a critical juncture in Taiwan's history, two years after the lifting of the decades-long martial law. The album was critical in the formation of the genre known as New Taiwanese Song.

Its members included Wang Ming Hui (Chinese: 王明輝), Chen Ming Chang (Chinese: 陳明章), Lin Wei Zhe(Chinese: 林暐哲).

The first album's notes reveal the seriousness with which the group assessed its own role in Taiwan's musical development. They believed that Taiwanese music ought to reflect the times, that it was important for the new generations to "correctly" see the relationship between the mother tongue and themselves. Unlike virtually all other previous works, their songs sought to engage post-World War II social changes in a frank, realist way.

The songs' styles cover Taiwanese folk, rap, and rock. One song has a clip of the Republic of China national anthem. Another samples environmental sounds from the street. Most of the songs told stories, sometimes through humorous or ironic dialogues between ordinary citizens. Taiwanese is used extensively in many of the songs.

In 1996, the group released their second album, Cradle Songs (Yaolan qu). However, the album was a commercial and critical failure.

The group received the Special Contribution Award during the 30th Golden Melody Awards.

== Discography ==
=== Songs of Madness (1989) ===
The titles below are official ones provided by Rock Records:

1. Imperial Taipei (Chinese: 台北帝國)
2. Mad (Chinese: 抓狂)
3. Too Sad to Speak (Chinese: 傷心無話)
4. Papa's Words (Chinese: 阿爸的話)
5. Dragon Festival Celebration (Chinese: 慶端陽)
6. Taxi (Chinese: 計程車)
7. A Democracy Bumpkin (Chinese: 民主阿草)
8. Shin-chuang Street (Chinese: 新莊街)
9. Sow a Seed (Chinese: 播種)
