= Gang-a-tsui =

Taiwanese nanguan music ensemble

Gang-a-tsui (Chinese: 江之翠, from toponym Chinese: 港仔嘴; Pe̍h-ōe-jī: Káng-á-chhùi) is a nanguan music ensemble from Taiwan. It was formed in 1993 by Chou Yih-chang (周逸昌), and in 1997 it received a commission by the National Center for Traditional Arts in Taiwan as part of the Nanguan Opera Transmission Project. The ensemble has toured Japan, Korea, Indonesia, France, Poland and Mexico, and toured the US in 2003. They also toured the US in 2007.
