= March of Happiness =

- Film poster
- Traditional Chinese: 天馬茶房
- Simplified Chinese: 天马茶房
- Literal meaning: Tianma Tea House
- Hanyu Pinyin: Tiān Mǎ Chá Fáng
- Hokkien POJ: Thian-má Tê Pâng
- Directed by: Lin Cheng-sheng
- Written by: Yeh Chin-sheng; Tseng Yu-wen
- Screenplay by: Ko So-ching
- Produced by: Yeh Chin-sheng
- Starring: Hsiao Shu-shen; Lim Giong; Leon Dai; Lung Shao-hua; Doze Niu; Chen Ming-chang
- Cinematography: Tsai Cheng-hui
- Edited by: Chen Hsiao-jing; Hu Ju-sung
- Music by: Chen Ming-chang
- Production company: Green Apple Films
- Release date: 1999
- Running time: 94 minutes
- Country: Taiwan
- Languages: Taiwanese Hokkien; Japanese; Mandarin; Shanghainese

March of Happiness is a 1999 Taiwanese film directed by Lin Cheng-sheng. It tells the story of a teenage romance in a performing troupe set against the backdrop of the Japanese occupation and the 228 Massacre. Several characters are either historical or based on historical people.

The film was Taiwan's official Best Foreign Language Film submission at the 72nd Academy Awards, but did not manage to receive a nomination. The film was also screened in the Un Certain Regard section at the 1999 Cannes Film Festival.

There are two slightly different versions. In the TV version shown on Formosa Television, the film ends with both protagonists singing the theme song together, even though the male protagonist was already dead. In the cinema version, the film ends with the female protagonist singing the song by herself in a much slower tempo. The TV version is about 9 minutes longer.

== Cast ==
- Lim Giong as A Jin
- Hsiao Shu-shen as A Yu
- Grace Chen as Cigarette woman
- Lung Shao-hua as Sea Dragon
- Chen Ming-chang as Hsian Ge
- Leon Dai as Zhan Tian-ma
- Doze Niu as A Bao
