= Wang Xinxin (musician) =

Nanyin musician from China

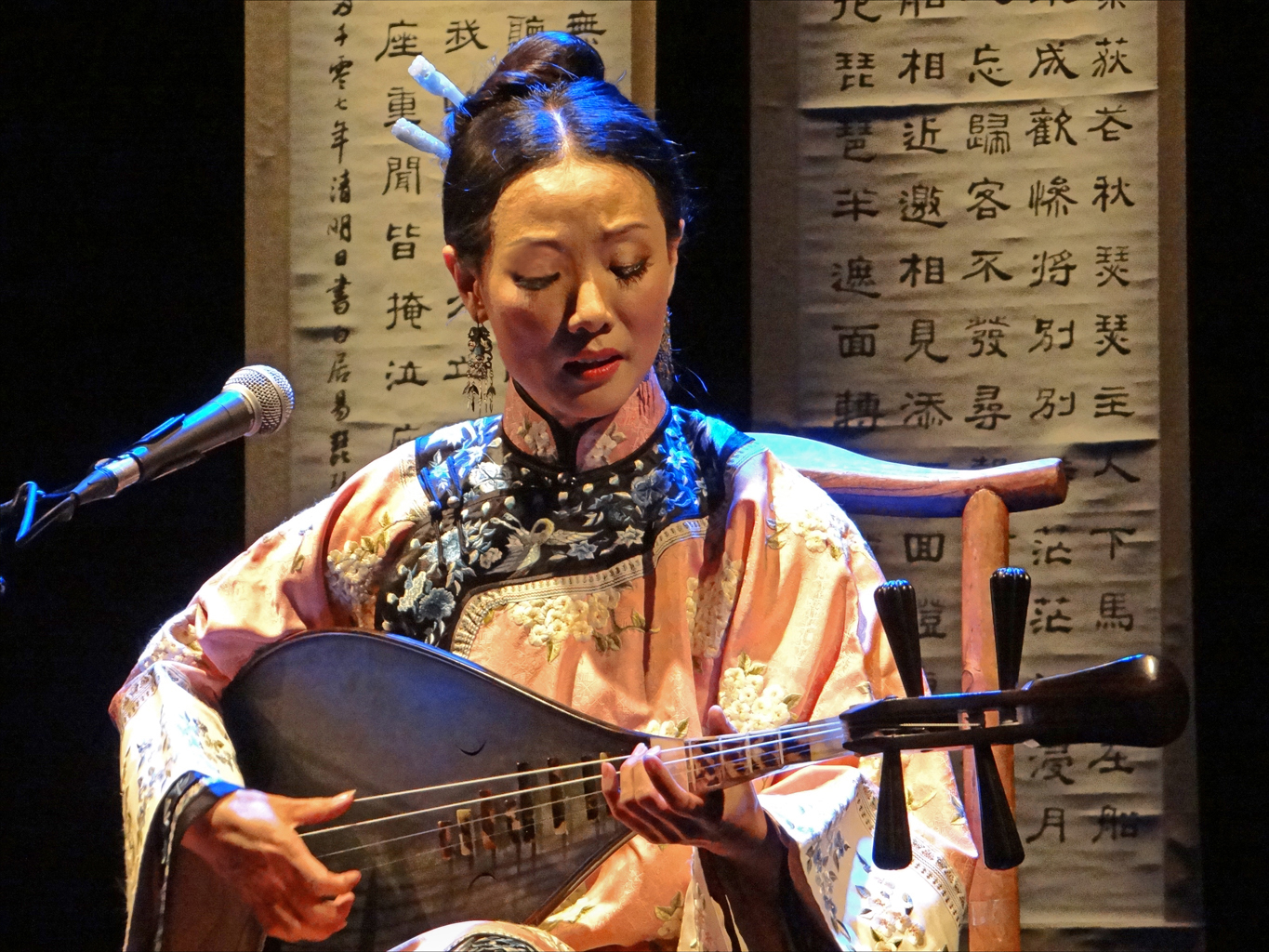
Wang Xin-xin performs in Musée Guimet, Paris.

Wang Xin-xin is a Nanyin (or Nan Guan) musician from China and the founder of Xin-xin Nanguan Ensemble (心心南管樂坊). Along with her ensemble, Wang is known to promote traditional music to younger audience. She is also known in the west as one of the Asian musicians who frequently invited and collaborated with traditional and contemporary musicians.

Wang was born in Quanzhou, China. Quanzhou is well known as the birthplace of Nanyin, one of the oldest Chinese music genre. The instruments of Nanyin were quite similar to those used in ancient Chinese music which most of them are no longer played or changed today. This kind of music has quite peculiar tune if compared with other Han Chinese music.

Wang moved to Taiwan in 1992 and joined Hantang Yuefu (漢唐樂府) as music supervisor.

Wang seeks new methods to introduce Nanyin to her audience such as to make fusion music with symphony orchestra, contemporary music and modern dance. She created music fusion in order to make it more approachable to broader audience.

In 2003, she founded Xinxin Nanguan Ensemble. Meanwhile, Nanyin is still the theme of the group, she added their performance with more colorful and artistic movement such as theatrical art elements. Xinxin Nanguan Ensemble is well-known Asian music group in international folk music festivals, especially in Europe.

== Album ==
- Farewell My Emperor.
- Flowers Bloom in the Garden.
- Nostalgia in Moonlight.
- Temporality and Nirvana—Heart Sutra.

== Links ==
- Hantang Yuefu (漢唐樂府)
- Xin-xin Nan Guan 心心南管
