= Formosa Aboriginal Song and Dance Troupe =

The Formosa Aboriginal Song and Dance Troupe (Chinese: 原舞者) is an ensemble that performs Taiwanese folk music. The group consists of younger musicians and performers who learn dances and music from elder experts and ethnologists. The group has toured internationally in North America, Europe, and Asia.

The troupe is Presbyterian. The Academia Sinica's Institute of Ethnology maintains a digital archive related to the troupe covering activities between 1991 and 1996, when Academia Sinica research fellow Hu Tai-li served as adviser to the group. A cofounding member of the company, Faidaw Fagod, served as the troupe's artistic director.

== History ==
The Formosa Aboriginal Song and Dance Troupe was established in 1991 by Ko Li-mei. The group gathered in Kaohsiung. The troupe struggled to raise money and book performances. The dancers heard that Ko planned to sell the group, and chose to continue without her. After a few months of operation, the Council for Cultural Affairs agreed to subsidize the troupe with funds from the National Endowment for Culture and Arts. Troupe members traveled to Nanwang in Taitung City, and eventually convinced Puyuma elders to teach them tribal dances. They trained at Nanwang for one year. The dance company moved to Xindian City in Taipei County in 1992. From 2001, the dance company became a part of the Formosa Indigenous Dance Foundation of Culture and Arts. The foundation relocated to Hualien City in 2007.

== Performances ==
The troupe's first performance following formal training took place at Taitung County Culture Center in 1992. That same year, the troupe was invited to perform at the Presidential Office Building during Double Ten Day celebrations. The troupe was awarded a medal at the 15th Wu San-lien Awards ceremony in November 1992. The troupe performed in New York in August 1993, marking their first international tour. Dancers later incorporated dances from other indigenous cultures in Taiwan. The troupe has won two Golden Melody Awards for traditional music, receiving the best singing performer award in 2006, followed by the award for best traditional album in 2011.

The Formosa Aboriginal Song and Dance Troupe appeared at the 2006 Aboriginal Music Concert organized by the Taipei City Government, and have since performed at many festivals celebrating indigenous cultures, including the Global Indigenous Peoples Performing Arts Festival in 2011 and 2014. The troupe joined president Ma Ying-jeou on a diplomatic trip throughout Oceania in March 2010, and returned home to feature in the Taipei International Flora Exposition. During the exposition, the Formosa Aboriginal Song and Dance Troupe and Hugh Lee's Ping-Fong Acting Troupe co-produced The First Lily, the first Taiwanese musical to be adapted from a Rukai legend. In 2012, the Formosa Aboriginal Song and Dance Troupe was invited to perform at the inaugural Tainan Arts Festival.

The troupe performed Maataw: the Floating Island at the National Theater in 2016. It was the first time that the Yami people had been featured in a performance within the theater. Maataw focused on the relationship between the Yami people and the government. Other performances by the Formosa Aboriginal Song and Dance Troupe also have political influences such as Dreaming of Azalea Mountain in 2011, about the death of Uyongʉ Yata'uyungana during the White Terror.
