= Quguan =

Quguan are amateur clubs formed beginning in the seventeenth century for the cultivation of Taiwanese folk music.

The Hoklo (or Holo) immigrated from Fujian starting in the 17th century, and brought with them informal folk music, as well as more ritualized instrumental and operatic forms, which were taught in the quguan.
