= Han-Tang Yuefu =

Taiwanese music and dance ensemble

The Han-Tang Yuefu Music Ensemble (Chinese: 漢唐樂府; pinyin: Hàn-Táng Yuèfǔ; Pe̍h-ōe-jī: Hàn-tông Ga̍k-hú) is a music and dance company based in Tamsui, Taiwan. It specializes in Nanguan, a form of classical Chinese music from Fujian and Taiwan, and Liyuan, a dance style derived from the string puppetry used in regional opera. It was founded in 1983 by choreographer and Nanguan musician Chen Mei-o, to preserve and promote Nanguan by fusing it with other traditional arts like Liyuan.

The company has won several important arts awards in Taiwan and received international acclaim for their performances at various music festivals throughout the world.
