= Taiwan International Cello Festival =

Music festival

The Taiwan International Cello Festival (TWICF) is an annual music festival held in Taipei, Kaohsiung, and other cities in Taiwan during the autumn season. The festival was founded by Swiss-Taiwanese cellist Pi-Chin Chien, and features international and Taiwanese cellists performing across a wide variety of musical styles and formats.

== History ==
The Taiwan International Cello Festival is organized by the association Swiss Music Night in Taiwan. This cultural initiative was founded in 2013 by cellist Pi-Chin Chien and her husband, Swiss composer Fabian Müller, in collaboration with the Trade Office of Swiss Industries (TOSI) in Taipei. It was established to promote cultural exchange between Switzerland and Taiwan.

In 2023, Swiss Music Night celebrated its 10th anniversary with a series of concerts. This series also coincided with the creation of the Taiwan International Cello Festival.

The inaugural edition of the festival took place from 9 to 19 October 2024. Events were held at the Recital Hall of the National Theater and Concert Hall in Taipei and the Recital Hall of the Weiwuying National Kaohsiung Center for the Arts. The program included concerts, masterclasses, and workshops in both cities.,

== Musicians and program ==
Each year, international guest artists perform alongside leading Taiwanese cellists. Together, they prepare and perform concert programs that include solo works, chamber music, and ensemble performances. In addition to the main stage concerts, the festival offers masterclasses and workshops.

=== 2024 Edition ===
The inaugural festival featured the concert series "The Cello in the Multiverse", with three performances at the National Recital Hall in Taipei and one at the Weiwuying in Kaohsiung. An additional open-air concert in collaboration with the Academy of Taiwan Strings was held at the historic Samsiu Garden in Yunlin. International guests included Jens Peter Maintz, Christian Poltéra and Wen-Sinn Yang. A special emphasis was placed on jazz cello, with German jazz cellist Stephan Braun leading a workshop on the topic.

Cellists:

- Jens-Peter Maintz (Germany)
- Christian Poltéra (Switzerland)
- Wen-Sinn Yang (Switzerland)
- Stephan Braun (Germany)
- Pi-Chin Chien (Switzerland–Taiwan)
- Simon Thompson (Taiwan)
- Ching-Tzy Ko (Taiwan)
- Chu-Chuan Liu (Taiwan)
- Victor Coo (Taiwan)

Pianists:

- Lina Yeh (Taiwan)
- Tseng-Yi (Mike) Tseng (Taiwan)

Orchestra:

- Academy of Taiwan Strings

=== 2025 Edition ===
The 2nd Taiwan International Cello Festival (TWICF) took place from September 28 to October 6, at the Recital Hall of the National Theater and Concert Hall in Taipei and the Recital Hall of the Weiwuying National Kaohsiung Center for the Arts and featured a series of concerts, masterclasses, and workshops on Baroque Cello (Kristin von der Goltz) and cello making.

The 2025 festival spotlighted the artistry of leading female cellists like Anne Gastinel (France), Raphaela Gromes (Germany), Natalie Clein (UK), and Kristin von der Goltz (Germany), as they performed works by female composers including Fanny Mendelssohn, Henriëtte Bosmans, Rebecca Clarke, Rita Strohl, and Grażyna Bacewicz.

World premieres: The program included the world premiere of "Antiphon" by Fabian Müller based on Hildegard von Bingen's psalm "Caritas Abundat" for voice and eight cellos, as well as an eight-cello arrangement of Dvořák's Symphony No. 8, Op. 88.

Cellists:

- Anne Gastinel (France)
- Raphaela Gromes (Germany)
- Natalie Clein (England)
- Kristin von der Goltz (Germany)
- Pi-Chin Chien (Switzerland–Taiwan)
- Ling-Yi Ou Yang (Taiwan)
- Leewen Dai (Taiwan)
- Yi-Chin Cheng (Taiwan)

Pianists:

- Eva Yulin Shen (Taiwan)
- Pei-Chun Liao (Taiwan)
- Julian Riem (Germany)
- Jo-Yu Chen (Taiwan)

others:

- Apo Hsu, conductor (Taiwan)
- Ryan Zen, Chinese flute (Taiwan)
- YenTing Lo, voice (Taiwan)

=== 2026 Edition ===
The third Taiwan International Cello Festival (TWICF) took place from October 4 to 24, 2026, under the theme East–West Confluence. The festival featured six concerts in Taipei, Taichung, Kaohsiung, and Yunlin County. Venues included the National Concert Hall in Taipei, the National Taichung Theater, the National Kaohsiung Center for the Arts (Weiwuying), and the historic Samsiu Garden in Yunlin.

The festival focused on musical exchanges between Western and East Asian traditions. International guest artists included French cellist Victor Julien-Laferrière, Chinese cellist Yibai Chen, Polish cellist Krzysztof Michalski, and Japanese cellist Yo Kitamura. Performances included collaborations with the Taipei Chinese Orchestra, conducted by Yin-Fang Chang. Other participating cellists included Pi-Chin Chien, Nan-Cheng Chen, Ying-Yuan Huang, Liang-Yu Chen, and Franck Bernède.

Contemporary music and world premieres formed another focus of the programme. These included Yushan, a composition for traditional Chinese orchestra by Swiss composer Fabian Müller, and a work commissioned for the festival from Taiwanese composer Yuan-Chen Li, inspired by the twelve animals of the Chinese zodiac. The programme also featured compositions by Hwang-Long Pan, Tan Dun, Dai Fujikura, and Volkmar Andreae. Several works, including settings of poems by Li Bai and music from Madama Butterfly by Giacomo Puccini, were performed in new arrangements for eight cellos by Fabian Müller.

In addition to the concerts, the festival offered masterclasses and workshops. Musician Summer Lei and Fabian Müller led a workshop exploring intercultural musical exchange, while French cellist and ethnomusicologist Franck Bernède presented a workshop on musical connections between Asia and Europe. Under the title Moments of Resonance, events in Taipei and Kaohsiung also provided opportunities for amateur cellists to perform alongside the festival's international guest artists.

Cellists:

- Victor Julien-Laferrière (France)
- Yibai Chen (China)
- Krzysztof Michalski (Poland)
- Yo Kitamura (Japan)
- Pi-Chin Chien (Switzerland/Taiwan)
- Nan-Cheng Chen (Taiwan)
- Ying-Yuan Huang (Taiwan)
- Franck Bernède (Taiwan/France)
- Liang-Yu Chen (Taiwan)

Pianist:

- Yi-Chih Lu (Taiwan)

Orchestras:

- Taipei Chinese Orchestra TCO (Taiwan)
- Yin-Fang Chang, Dirigentin (Taiwan)
- OneSong Orchestra (Taiwan)
- Wei-Yung Tseng, Dirigent (Taiwan)

others:

- Summer Lei, Workshop (Taiwan)
- Tieh-Fei Li, Lesung (Taiwan)

== Artistic direction ==
The artistic director and founder of the Taiwan International Cello Festival is cellist Pi-Chin Chien. The artistic co-director is Swiss composer Fabian Müller.
