= Temple festivals =

Temple festivals may refer to:

- Temple festivals of Kerala (India)
- Chinese miaohui
- Vietnamese Hùng Kings' Festival
