= Shan'ge =

Chinese folk music genre

Shan'ge (Chinese: 山歌; pinyin: shāngē) is a genre of Chinese folk song, akin to a ballad.. They are commonly sung in rural provinces; the word "Shan'ge" means "mountain song".

A number of different subtypes are:

- Hua'er, a form popular in the Northwestern Chinese provinces such as Gansu, Ningxia and Qinghai, named to the Representative List of the Intangible Cultural Heritage of Humanity in 2009
- Xintianyou and Shanqu are popular in Shaanxi and Shanxi
- Zhengjinghong, from the Anhui province
- Xingguo, from the Jiangxi province
- Hengyang from the Hunan Province
- Hakka hill song (Kejia shan'ge) from the Guangdong Province
- Lalu, a Tibetan shan'ge
- Changdiao (aradun-urtu-yin-daguu), a Mongolian shan'ge
- Feige, a Miao shan'ge.
