= Beiguan music =

Traditional music of China

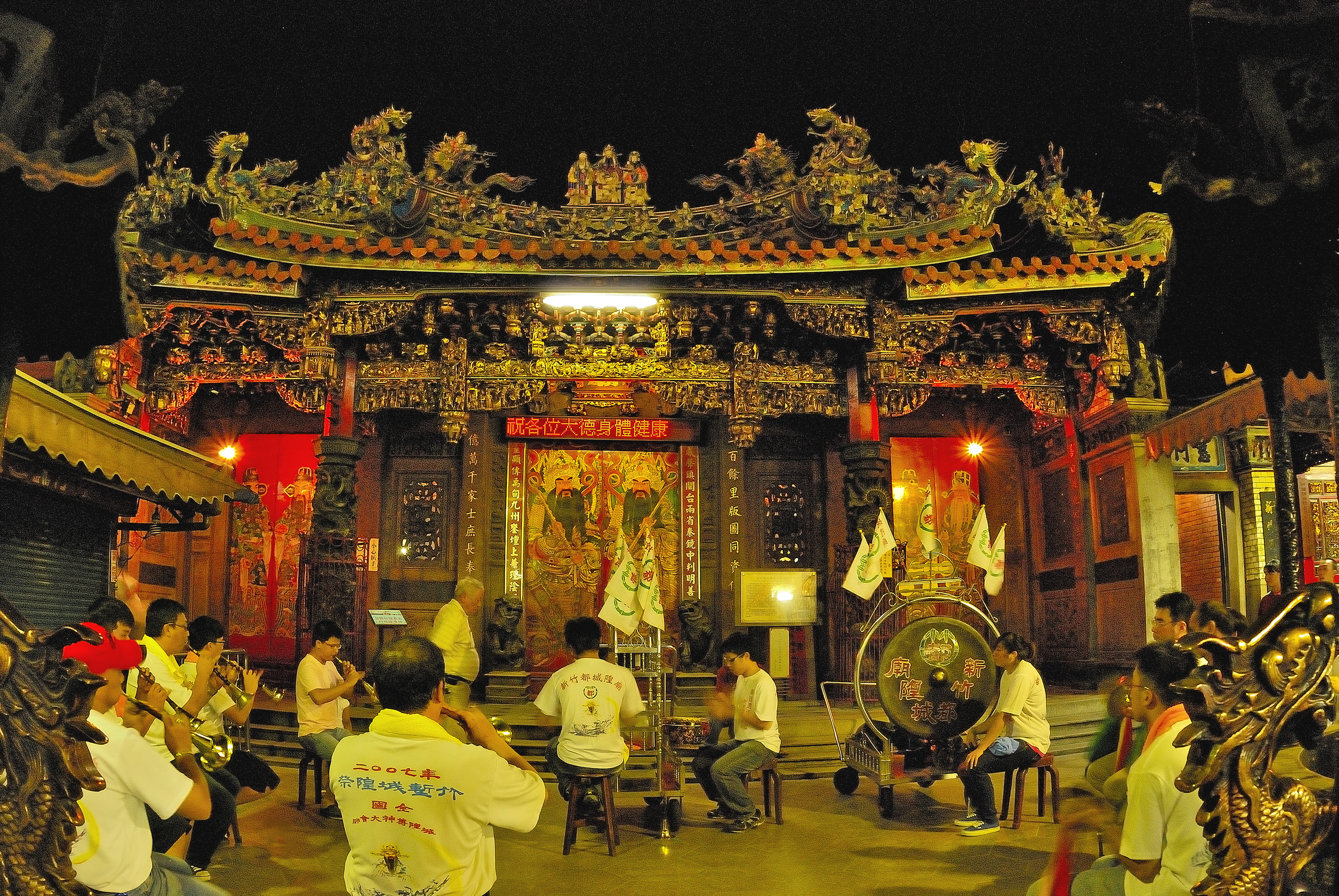
Beiguan in Hsinchu City God Temple

Beiguan (Chinese: 北管; pinyin: Běiguǎn; Pe̍h-ōe-jī: Pak-kóan) is a type of traditional music, melody and theatrical performance between the 17th and mid-20th centuries. It was widespread in Taiwan. By the early 21st century its popularity had declined precipitously.

Beiguan usually uses the following instruments: two suona (oboes), bangzi (woodblock), daluo (large bossed gong), xiaoluo (small gong), bangu (high-pitched drum), tonggu (small drum), xiaobo (small cymbals), and dabo (large cymbals) and pipa. It may also use dagu (large drum), various huqin, and plucked instruments.

== History in Taiwan ==
=== Introduction to Taiwan (18th century) ===
During the Qing dynasty, Beiguan was introduce to Taiwan through immigrants from Fujian, particularly those from the Zhangzhou area.^{[1]} Over time, Beiguan developed into a distinctive Taiwanese musical tradition and became integrated into Taiwanese people’s daily lives, appearing in religious ceremonies, festivals, funerals, and traditional theatrical performances.^{[2]}

=== Development in the 19th century ===
During the 19th century, Beiguan developed through professional opera troupes and amateur musical associations, also known as zidi (子弟). Members of these associations gathered together during their leisure time to the instruments and opera of Beiguan, and regularly performed at community events.^{[3]}

In 1811, Beiguan musician Yang Yingqiu (楊應求) founded Lichunyuan (梨春園) in Changhua. It’s the oldest existing amateur Beiguan association, and is often referred to as the leader of Beiguan culture.^{[4]}

=== Japanese colonial period (1895-1945) ===
During the Japanese ruling in Taiwan, Beiguan entered the commercial recording industry. In 1914, Fifteen Taiwanese Hakka and Hoklo performers were invited to Tokyo to record traditional Taiwanese music, including Beiguan.^{[5]} Many Beiguan associations also started to adapt to different forms of recording and performance during this period.^{[6]}

Beginning in 1937, the Japanese assimilation movement (kōminka) led to strict restrictions against traditional musical performances and caused the decline of Beiguan activities.^{[1]}

=== Post-war development and preservation ===
Following the end of the Japanese colonial rule in 1945, Beiguan welcomed its revival under the Chinese government. However, its popularity subsequently declined as lifestyles shifted and modern forms of entertainment, such as television, became more widespread.^{[1]} Many amateur associations also faced difficulties in recruiting young musicians.

Efforts in preserving the tradition included government-funded training programmes and collaborations with schools.^{[3]} On 17 February 2009, Beiguan music was officially recognized as an important traditional performing art, and Lichunyuan was designated as a special preservation group under the intangible cultural heritage system.^{[7]}

== Social Contexts ==
In Taiwan, Beiguan music is deeply embedded in local civic culture, mostly performed by amateur “student troupes” and community organisations known as “Shetou” (社頭). Historically, ordinary workers such as farmers formed these groups, financed their own clubs, hired their own teachers, and learned to play the instruments and perform the operas in their spare time.

Performances served as an important part of secular and religious milestones. The most notable are temple festivals (Miaohui temple festivals), deity processions, weddings, and funerals. The performance formats have a wide range from Zidi paichang (friendly musical competitions between amateur community troupes) to Banxian (ritual performances where actors assume the roles of deities to bestow blessings on the public).

A core function of Beiguan music is the so-called renao (熱鬧) atmosphere it creates. Unique instruments such as the suona and the percussion result in a unique sound best described as “hot and noisy”.

Due to the large size of the Beiguan communities and the close ties to their village and religious identities, historical rivalry could be found between groups. During the Qing dynasty, competition often led to physical conflicts, most notably between the Xipi (西皮) and Fulu (福路) groups, who not only differed by their instrumental style but also by their religious beliefs.

In recent years, despite the constant demand of religious festivals, the number of active Beiguan groups has declined due to aging membership. The tradition is sustained by being a registered cultural asset supported by government-subsidized teaching programs and school collaborations.

== Meanings & Repertoire ==
Beiguan has two main styles, each with two names: Fulu (福路), also called gulu (古路, “old path”), and Xipi (西皮), also called xinlu (新路, “new path”). Fulu reached Taiwan first. Each style has its own lead fiddle. Fulu uses the kezaixian (殼仔絃), a coconut-shell fiddle also called the yehu. Xipi uses the diaoguizi (吊規仔), a bamboo-bodied fiddle identified with the jinghu (Jinghu (instrument)) of Beijing opera (Peking opera).

In Beiguan opera, singing depends on the role type (jiaose 腳色). Refined roles such as xiaosheng (小生), xiaodan (小旦) and zhengdan (正旦) sing in falsetto, called xikou (細口, “thin mouth”). Roles such as the older laosheng (老生) and laodan (老旦) and the painted-face dahua (大花) sing in their natural voice, called cukou (粗口, “thick mouth”). Comic roles (chou 丑) speak in local dialect, and the other roles speak a stage Mandarin.

Singers also add vocables (jiashengci 加聲詞), meaningless syllables inserted between words to draw out the end of a phrase. Thin-mouth singers use yi (伊) and thick-mouth singers use a (阿). Where a singer places them is an important part of how the singing is judged.

== See also ==
- Nanguan
