= Nanguan music =

Music genre

Nanyin
- UNESCO Intangible Cultural Heritage
- Country: China
- Reference: 199
- Region: Asia and the Pacific

Inscription history
- Inscription: 2009
- UNESCO Cultural Heritage

Nanguan music
- Chinese: 南管
- Tâi-lô: Lâm-kuán
Transcriptions
Standard Mandarin
- Hanyu Pinyin: Nánguǎn
Southern Min
- Tâi-lô: Lâm-kuán

Alternative Chinese name
- Chinese: 南音
- Tâi-lô: Lâm-im
Transcriptions
Standard Mandarin
- Hanyu Pinyin: Nányīn
Southern Min
- Tâi-lô: Lâm-im

Second alternative Chinese name
- Chinese: 南樂
- Tâi-lô: Lâm-ga̍k
Transcriptions
Standard Mandarin
- Hanyu Pinyin: Nányuè
Southern Min
- Tâi-lô: Lâm-ga̍k

Third alternative Chinese name
- Chinese: 南曲
- Tâi-lô: Lâm-khiok
Transcriptions
Standard Mandarin
- Hanyu Pinyin: Nánqǔ
Southern Min
- Tâi-lô: Lâm-khiok

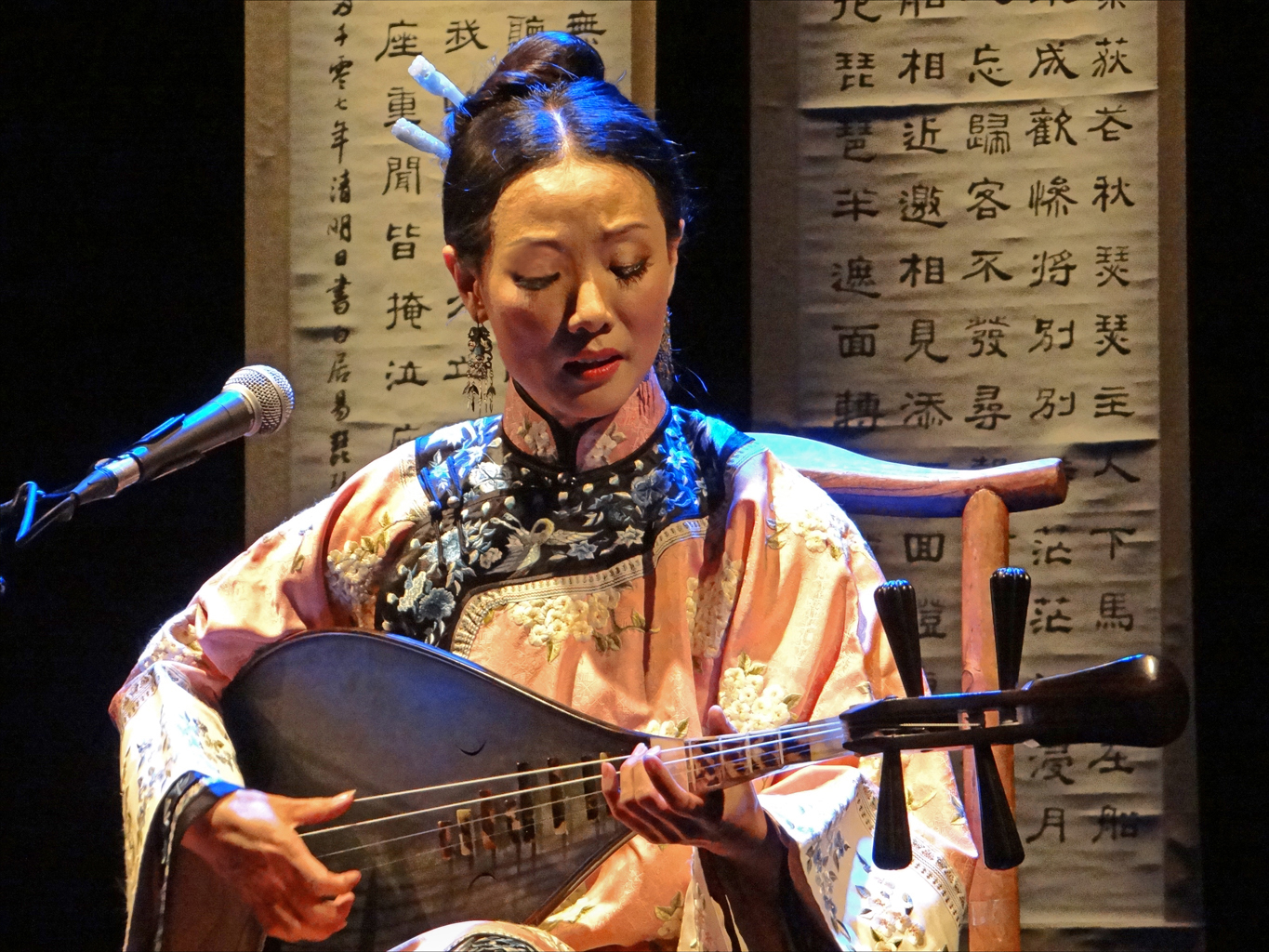
Wang Xin-xin playing Nanguan pipa. The Nanguan pipa is held in the ancient manner like a guitar which is different from the near-vertical way pipa is now usually held.

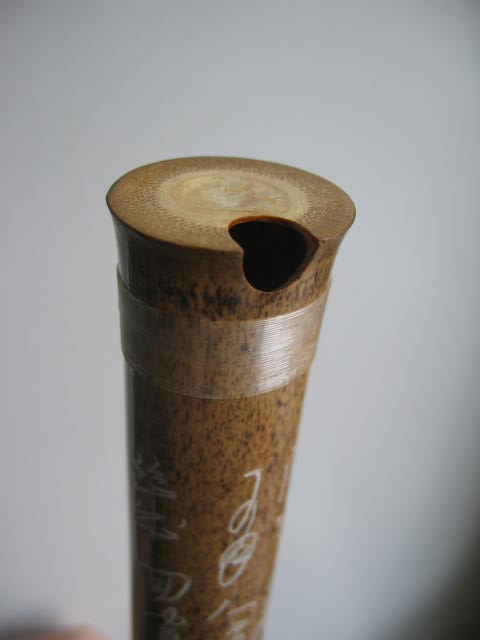
The mouthpiece of the Xiao flute.

Nanguan (Chinese: 南管; pinyin: Nánguǎn; Tâi-lô: Lâm-kuán; lit. 'southern pipes'; also nanyin, nanyue, xianguan, or nanqu) is a style of Chinese chamber music from the southern Chinese province of Fujian. Nanguan was first brought to Taiwan during the Ming dynasty by the Han Chinese immigrants who later settled predominantly in southern Taiwan, where they established quguan music societies to maintain and transmit their cultural practices. However, over the centuries, Nanguan evolved separately from its mainland counterpart, shaped strongly by Taiwan’s unique socio-political conditions and local influences.

Historically, Nanguan was played for the elite, including Emperor Kangxi, which allowed for its status to be elevated within society. Participation in quguan societies was once strictly regulated, with membership restricted from individuals who were seen as ‘improper’ - barbers, stage performers, or geisha entertainers. It became popular in Taiwan, particularly Lukang on west coast, as well as among Overseas Chinese in Southeast Asia.

Fujian is a mountainous coastal province of China. Its provincial capital is Fuzhou, while Quanzhou was a major port in the 7th century CE, the period between the Sui and Tang eras. Situated upon an important maritime trade route, it was a conduit for elements of distant cultures. The result was what is now known as nanguan music, which today preserves many archaic features.

It is a genre strongly associated with male-only community amateur musical associations (quguan or "song-clubs"), each formerly generally linked to a particular temple, and is viewed as a polite accomplishment and a worthy social service, distinct from the world of professional entertainers. The temples provide the venue and funding support for these clubs and are thus regarded as spaces of divine worship. They also contribute to the artistic quality of temple fairs and serve as important mediums for cultural expression.

Nanguan music embodies a philosophy of introspection and inner cultivation. It is typically slow, gentle, delicate and melodic, heterophonic and employing four basic scales. Performers adopt calm and focused postures, and the music expresses some form of restraint, designed to evoke a meditative state and convey controlled emotion. In the same way, Nanguan not only serves to be a musical performance, but also a disciplined spiritual practice, one that continues to resonate within the evolving cultural landscape of contemporary Taiwan.

While Nanguan was traditionally male-dominated due to ritualistic and Confucian norms, recent decades have witnessed a growing presence of women within the art form, reflecting broader shifts in gender dynamics and increased accessibility. Nanguan music continues to thrive today. Contemporary groups like XinXin Nanguan are adapting the tradition through theatrical performances and cross-art collaborations.

Nanguan was inscribed in 2009 on the Representative List of the Intangible Cultural Heritage of Humanity by UNESCO.

== Repertoire ==
Nanguan repertory khiok-ba̍k (曲目) falls into three overlapping styles, called tsí, phóo, and khiok (zhǐ, pǔ, and qù in Mandarin), differentiated by the contexts in which they occur, by their function, the value accorded them by musicians and by their formal and timbral natures.

- Tsí (指) or Tsí-thò (指套) literally means "finger set", is the longest repertoire: it is normally half to one hour in length, of two to five sections usually, each section being known as a tsóo 組 or tè 塊 ("piece"). There are currently 48 sets thò 套 of tsí, consisting of the original 36 sets (inner sets) and the 12 sets (outer sets) added later. It runs through long pieces with a strong timbre, contains a lot of high and long notes, and has no resting sections. Each is associated with a lyric that alludes to a story. The content of the lyrics mainly comes from historical stories, mostly describing the joys and sorrows of love between men and women. Although, this may denote origins in song or opera, today tsí is an important and respected instrumental repertory. However, the song text significantly eases the memorising of the piece.
- Phóo (譜) or Tuā-phóo (大譜) literally means "notation", more formally as qingzou pu ("refined notation"), are purely instrumental and typically performed by a 5-instrument ensemble. These are pieces that have no associated texts and are thus written down in gongchepu notation. There is no interruption between chapters during performance. There are currently 16 sets thò 套 of phóo, consisting of the original 13 sets (inner sets) and the three sets (outer sets) added later. It is an instrumental style that uses a wider range than tsí and that emphasises technical display. The content tends to describe the scenery and objects, and express feelings through objects. Phóo is considered to be a representative of the elegance and solemnity of Nanguan.
- Khiok (曲) or Suánn-khiok (散曲) "verse", is a vocal repertory: two thousand pieces exist in manuscript. The singer is the main character during performance. The tune of each khiok comes from the tune of the Nanguan tune system khik-tiāu hē-thóng (曲調系統). It is lighter and less conservative in repertory and performance than tsí. Most popular pieces today are in a fast common metre and last around five minutes.

== Instruments ==
A nanguan ensemble usually consists of five instruments.

- phik-pán (拍板), the wooden clapper consisting of five pieces made from sandalwood is usually played by the singer.

The other four, known as the tíng-sì-kuán (頂四管) or four higher instruments, are the:

- gî-pê (琵琶), the four-stringed lute which forms the backbone of Nanguan music with its sonorous tones and directs the tempo of the music (called Pipa in Mandarin),
- sam-hiân (三弦), the three-stringed, fretless, snakeskin-headed long-necked lute that is the ancestor of the Japanese shamisen (called the sanxian in Mandarin), it has a low timbre and strong resonance to complement the main sound of the gî-pê.
- tōng-siau (洞簫), the vertical flute which will guide other instruments into the next musical phrase (also called siau (箫) or xiao in Mandarin), and a
- jī-hiân (二弦), the two-stringed "hard-bowed" instrument usually appearing in the interval of the tōng-siau sound to help the lingering sound of tōng-siau and harmonize other tíng-sì-kuán instruments. It is slightly differing from the Cantonese erxian.

When the four instruments are played together, the players sit opposite each other, forming a horseshoe shape. The phik-pán is in the center, the gî-pê and sam-hiân are on the right hand side, and the tōng-siau and jī-hiân are on the left hand side. The players will sit on the golden lion chair and play the music leisurely. The saying "sitting on five golden chairs" (坐遍五张金交椅) describes a musical all-rounder who is proficient in singing and playing the four instruments. Each of the four differs somewhat from the most usual modern form and so may be called the "nanguan pipa" etc. Each instrument has a fixed role. The gî-pê provides a steady rhythmic skeleton, supported by the sam-hiân. The siau, meanwhile, supplemented by the jī-hiân, puts "meat on the bones" with colourful counterpoints.

Nanguan performance begins with tsí, which includes:

- ài-á (噯仔), the oboe-like woodwind instrument (called suona (嗩吶) in Mandarin), or
- phín-á (𥰔仔), the transverse flute (called the pin xiao (品簫) or dizi (笛子) in Mandarin) are often used instead of tōng-siau.

These instruments are essential to the genre, while theē-sì-kuán (下四管) or four lower instruments are not used in every piece. These are the ē-sì-kuán percussion instruments:

- hiang-tsuánn (響盞), a small gong placed in a bamboo basket and struck with a small mallet made of bamboo strips and paper,
- kiò-lô (叫鑼), consists of a small gong lô (鑼) and a wooden fish kho̍k-hî/kho̍k-hû (嘓魚), (called the Muyu (木魚) in Mandarin) which are connected by a rope,
- siang-tsing (雙鐘) or siang-im (雙音), a pair of small copper bells tâng-lîng (銅鈴) held by two hands, striking each other to produce sound, and
- sì-tè (四塊), a four-bar of bamboo xylophone, two pieces are held in each hand (called the sibao 四寶 in Mandarin).

When all six combine with the basic four, the whole ensemble is called a tsa̍p-im (什音) or "ten sounds".

== Notation System ==
Nanguan’s sheet music is traditionally written in a vertical format and is divided into three main types: 指(zhi), 曲(qu), and 譜(pu). 指(zhi) sheet music is a set of musical forms composed of two to eight single compositions. Even though the music contains lyrics, they aren’t sung during performances. 曲(qu) sheet music is the most common, consisting primarily of Sanqu, which is a poetic form of songs, with the current market publishing this form of Nanguan sheet music the most frequently. 譜(pu) sheet music is a set of musical forms solely for instrument players, containing only notations and no lyrics. The sheet music includes three main notations, with three lines per row, including:

1. 音符 (yin fu, notes) are in Kongche notation (工╳譜), which is similar to the Gongche notation used in traditional Chinese; they are featured on the left line of the sheet music. The five basic notes, which are Do, Re, Mi, Sol and La, are represented by ㄨ, 工, 六, 士 and 一.
1. 指法(zhi fa, fingering), this includes the rhythmic patterns and how long notes are played for, featured on the middle line.
2. 拍板(pai ban, clapping), this is for the clapper to determine the tempo of the music, featured on the right side of the row.

== Aesthetic ==
Nanguan was originally a refined pastime of the literati and gentry. Its aesthetics are profound and abstract, making it challenging for amateurs to fully understand. Many musical forms that attempt to emulate Nanguan often fail to grasp its essence. Some of the aesthetic aspects of Nanguan are outlined below:

=== Rhythm ===
The main repertoire of Nanguan often features an extremely slow tempo. However, the rhythm is not rigid; it typically begins with a slow, profound character, gradually becoming brisk and bright, before finally easing into a calm conclusion. These macro-level transitions are so subtle that they are often imperceptible during performance. Generally, slower Nanguan pieces demand higher artistic skill and technical proficiency. For instance, in the suite Yizhi Xiangsi (A Piece of Longing) from the “Five Great Zhi Suites,” the opening four characters alone require over four minutes to perform, embodying the literati ideal of “extending a single word over several breaths” Page text. Such slow pacing aims to showcase the resonance and timbre of the instruments or the vocalist. Timbre in Nanguan is the harmony of sounds in a wide range of vocal ranges, and is more detailed and changeable than the melody and vocal ups and downs. However, it requires keen auditory recognition, which is more difficult for beginners to perceive, and performers also need to have plenty of experience to master it finely.

=== Ensemble ===
The concept of "ensemble" (hezou) in Nanguan differs from the "unison" (qizou) of other musical genres. The beauty of such an ensemble was noted by Confucius during the Spring and Autumn period: "How music is to be known! At the start, it is all in unison (翕 xi). As it proceeds, it is in pure harmony (純 chun), it is clear (曒 jiao), and it is continuous (繹 yi), and so it is completed." Among these, xi and chun highlight the characteristic of multiple independent subjects coordinating in performance, which is significantly more difficult than unison playing. Coordination requires active mutual listening. Jiao refers to the distinct voices of each instrument, which occupy their own space without cluttering the texture—a concept Zhu Xi described as “harmony without losing order”. This is manifested through differences in timbre, timing, and melodic contour among the sounds. Despite their differences, these sounds merge through a generative process (相生 xiangsheng), becoming continuous (yi). These aesthetic features are fully realized in Nanguan ensembles. In the shang-sigu (upper four instruments) ensemble, the five instruments (including the paiban) are positioned according to their timbre, function, and technique, forming a multi-layered Yin-Yang (generative) relationship. Plucked instruments, with their bead-like sounds, form the “bone” of the music, while the flute and strings provide a continuous, flowing “flesh”. Their combination is described as “the entwinement of bone and flesh”(骨肉相纏). Such complexity requires profound tacit understanding among performers. At its highest level, the performers reach a state of spiritual unity and self-forgetfulness, referred to in Nanguan culture as "Harmony" (和 He) Nanguan musicians often use the Taoist principles of yin(陰) and yang(陽) to describe the balance between Nanguan instruments, connected to traditional values of harmony and unity within Nanguan communities. The Pipa(琵琶) is yang, while the Sanxian(三絃) is yin; the Xiao flute(簫) is yang, while the Erxian(二絃) is yin.

=== Solo performance ===
Traditional Nanguan also encompasses solo practice as a form of self-cultivation. This differs from public solo performance, as it pursues a state of tranquility and transcendence. For the Nanguan pipa, the player should “burn incense in a clean place, straighten their robes” before playing, then “sit with the left knee supported, maintaining a warm and gentle expression, with a calm mind and steady breath” before tuning the strings. During performance, the "bone sounds" of the pipa create significant "white space" (留白 liubai) within the slow tempo. The "flesh sounds" of the flute and strings, which usually fill these gaps, are sublimated into metaphysical "sounds beyond the strings" (弦外之音 xianwai zhiyin). In terms of the "bone and flesh" framework, this represents the classical aesthetic of "the interdependence of void and substance" (虛實相生 xushi xiangsheng). As the Qing painter Da Zhongguang noted: "Void and substance generate each other; the unpainted areas are where the true wonder lies". The essence of this aesthetic lies in the interaction between the finite (substance) and the infinite (void), allowing the performer to transcend the finite and reach the "totality of the circle" (huanzhong).

=== Culture ===
The elegance and refinement of Nanguan are inseparable from its cultural depth. Over its long history, Nanguan has formed a unique culture with its own norms and terminology. Practitioners call each other "string friend” (絃友 Xian-you) and use "Guan-ge" (館閣 pavilions/clubs) as spaces for musical exchange. They refer to themselves as "Lang-jun zi-di" (郎君子弟 disciples of the Prince), implying a bond of mutual appreciation between each other. Traditional practitioners maintain a rigorous attitude toward technique, posture, and coordination. The annual Spring and Autumn sacrifices and the "Zheng-xian" (整絃 string-tuning festivals) are major events, where practitioners gather for mutual refinement. This devotion, combined with a long-standing internal system of critique, maintains Nanguan's meditative, discipline-like style. This essence reflects the ancient literati’s pursuit of “wandering in the arts” (游於藝 you yu yi), setting Nanguan apart from other musical traditions.

== Symbolism and Meaning ==
=== Material ===
Bamboo is widely used in instruments such as Pipa (琵琶) , Sanxian (三絃), Dongxiao (洞簫), Erxian (二絃) and more. In Chinese culture, bamboo is an important symbolism of the Confucian "Junzi" (君子 gentlemen) due to its “joints” (moral integrity, 氣節), “hollowness” (humility, 虛心), and “toughness” (resilience, 堅韌). By using bamboo, Nanguan aligns itself with the values of literati culture, emphasizing refinement and ethical character .

Another material is copper or bronze, which appears in the percussion instruments, including Yuai (玉噯), Xiangzhan (響盞), Shuangyin (雙音) and Jiaoluo (叫鑼) [a]. All of them are not inherent instruments of Nanguan. In traditional Chinese history, bronze was used to make ritual vessels (禮器) like the Ding (鼎) which is the sign of state power and political authority. Those metallic sounds add a sense of solemnity and ritual weight to the music.

A third important material is python skin, used in instruments like the Erxian (二絃) and Sanxian (三絃). In the birthplace of Nanguan (southern Fujian area, 福建閩南地區), pythons represented good signs and viewed it as something that carried supernatural power. However, they had some aversion to it due to its venomous nature as well. Hence, those ancestors worshipped pythons. Using python skin in Nanguan music instruments can not only generate a unique texture of the music but seemed to give the music a sense of vitality and depth.

=== Animals ===
Many parts of Nanguan music instruments are decorated, shaped or even named after animals. The following are several examples:

The calling fish (鮫叫, Jiaojiao): A kind of lo(鑼, gong) in Nanguan, also called jiaoluo (叫鑼). The creature on the upper part of Jiaoluo has a head of dragon and a body of carp. Both of which are considered auspicious in Chinese culture. The dragon is believed to have the power to bring rain, while the fish symbolizes fishing and catching (carp is a kind of fish and 魚, fish has the same pronunciation with 漁, fishing). Combining the two together suggests the ability to obtain rain. Moreover, The story of the carp leaping over the Dragon Gate (鯉魚躍龍門) symbolizes the worship and reverence for divine beings.

The golden lion (金獅, Jinshe): A foot support used while playing. Lion was viewed as a “spirit beast (靈獸)” in Buddhism because it is the mount of Manjushri. Additionally, lions were considered to be the guardian in traditional Chinese culture. When the golden lion support is placed within the Nanguan music performance, it would create a contrast of “movement” and “stillness” in sound with the pipa leading the performance and the golden lion following behind. Visually, the lion's ferocity and the pipa's refinement, one "strong" and the other "refined," achieve a balance.

The bamboo horse (竹馬, Zhuma): A bridge-shaped wooden piece between the cylindrical surface and the chord in Erxian (二絃). Chinese Confucianism uses the metaphor of a horse to represent virtue, emphasizing inner qualities rather than outward appearance.

== The Nanguan Pipa ==
The Nanguan pipa, also known as the southern pipa (南琵琶), is one of the core melodic instruments in Nanguan music, both sonically and symbolically. Its name is derived from the ancient playing techniques associated with the instrument, where pi (琵) refers to plucking the strings from right to left using the front side of the right hand, while pa (琶) denotes the plucking from left to right using the back of the right hand. This encapsulates not only the physical action of playing the pipa, but also reflects the musical and philosophical/historical context of the Nanguan tradition.

Structurally, the Nanguan pipa differs from the modernised version of the instrument in contemporary settings and ensembles. It features a pear-shaped body, which supports a thin wooden soundboard that is typically arched at the back and flat at the front to enhance sound projection. Two crescent shaped sound holes are also often carved into the soundboard serving the same purpose, and the instrument also features thirteen frets - four embedded directly into the neck, and nine on the body. It also typically has four strings, which are originally made of silk, later replaced by nylon to enhance durability, although it is more common to have a blend of both silk and nylon strings today in order to preserve the tonal warmth and authenticity while ensuring longevity of the instrument lifespan as well. These strings are typically attached using side-mounted friction pegs and tuned to A-D-E-A, providing a brighter and more resonant tonal range across nearly four octaves

Played in a horizontal position across the lap, it emphasises restraint and subtlety rather than virtuosic display. The right hand is responsible for plucking the strings, while the left hand bends, presses, and modulates the strings for tonal variation. This performative style aligns with the genre’s broader philosophical ideals of inner cultivation and quiet refinement, reflecting the introspective nature of Nanguan music. More than just a musical instrument, the nanguan pipa represents a historical and cultural continuity that has been preserved through centuries of transmission. As an imperative part of the Nanguan ensemble, it is a representation of Taiwan’s intangible cultural heritage, showcasing the elegance, antiquity and refinement of Nanguan.

Symbolism and Meaning of the Nanguan Pipa

Beyond its function as a musical instrument, the Nanguan pipa holds deep symbolic resonance within the tradition. Retaining the form of the pipa from the Tang dynasty, its pear-shaped body, narrow neck and horizontal position when playing echoes ancient performance techniques. This continuity of both form and technique ultimately anchors the instrument in a broader narrative of historical preservation, particularly tied to the Minnan region and Han Chinese communities that brought Nanguan music to Taiwan. Furthermore, the Nanguan musicians interpreted its shape as resembling Tai Chi (太極) — a symbol of balance and harmony. This belief stems from the classical text which described the pipa as “其形象天地，位立太極...”, which means that its form resembles heaven and earth, positioned as supreme ultimate. This led to a notion that displaying the instrument in one’s home can offer spiritual protection (鎮宅避邪). The pipa’s soundboard is also slightly concave to concentrate vibrations and reduce their intensity, resulting in a deep and mellow sound.

In addition to its shape, the material of the instrument further reinforces its symbolic value. The body is often crafted from Chinese fir (杉木), which is a soft, lightweight wood with fine texture, which produces its rich and resonant tone. The strings were traditionally made of pure silk, which preserves the ancient tone connected to the Tang dynasty. Today, some of its strings use silk-nylon material for durability, but pure silk is still preferred for authentic timbre.

The symbolism of the pipa ultimately extends into Nanguan musical theory, where the pipa’s tone is more percussive and assertive, an association with the concept of yang (陽), while some of the other instruments like the xiao are associated with the concept of yin (陰) due to its gentle and airy tonality. Their interplay then reflects the yin-yang (陰陽), mirroring the Daoist principle of harmony and balance. Furthermore, in the same vein, the pipa also assumes a leadership role in the ensemble, often referred to metaphorically as the 萬軍主帅 — the commander of ten thousand troops. It introduces melodic cues and helps keep the ensemble rhythmically grounded, often using specific plucking patterns to signal transitions or mark structural divisions in the piece. In this way, the pipa is not only a vehicle for sound, but is also a representation of ritual authority and symbolic meaning within the Nanguan tradition.

== Diaspora ==
Starting in the 17th century, the Hoklo people who immigrated from Fujian to Taiwan took with them informal folk music as well as more ritualized instrumental and operatic forms taught in amateur clubs, such as beiguan and nanguan. Large Hoklo diaspora can also be found in Malaysia, Guangdong, Hong Kong, Philippines, Singapore, Burma, Thailand and Indonesia, where they are usually referred to as Hokkien.

In the 20th century, amidst the cultural shifts and modernising forces that swept through Taiwan, the preservation of Nanguan music - including its traditional instruments - became a focus on institutional and governmental efforts. Due to the significance as an intangible cultural heritage, Taiwan’s cultural bodies then initiated programs to document, teach, and promote Nanguan music in both the community, and academic settings. Ultimately, these efforts not only continue to reaffirm Nanguan music as a symbol of cultural identity and historical continuity.

There are two nanguan associations in Singapore and there were formerly several in the Philippines; Tiong-Ho Long-Kun-sia is still active. Gang-a-tsui and Han-Tang Yuefu have popularized the nanguan ensemble abroad. A Quanzhou nanguan music ensemble was founded in the early 1960s, and there is a Fuzhou folk music ensemble, founded in 1990.

== The Histrocial Evolution of Nanguan Music in Taiwan ==
Nanguan originated in Quanzhou(廣州), Fujian Province(福建), China, and is considered one of the oldest surviving forms of Chinese music, with historical roots tracing back to the Tang and Song dynasties. It was introduced to Taiwan during the eighteenth century by Minnan immigrants, for whom Nanguan served not only as a musical practice but also as an important cultural connection to their homeland.

In Taiwan, Nanguan became especially popular among Han Chinese communities, particularly in southern regions such as Tainan and Lukang. Musicians organized themselves into associations known as guan-ge (館閣), which functioned as both musical and social institutions. These organizations coordinated rehearsals, ritual performances, festival activities, and community gatherings, allowing Nanguan to become deeply integrated into local social life.

During the early twentieth century, Nanguan reached its peak popularity in Taiwan, with more than sixty Nanguan associations established across the island. However, modernization and changing social structures have gradually weakened many traditional practices. After 1949, a new wave of immigrants from Fujian brought additional Nanguan musicians to Taiwan, contributing to the preservation of the tradition. Organizations such as the Min Nan Yuefu, established in Taipei in 1961, became important centers for Nanguan performance and transmission.

At the same time, cultural policy under the KMT(國民黨) government emphasized Mandarin, Chinese opera, and officially promoted forms of “national music.” Local Taiwanese traditions were often marginalized within this framework. By the 1970s, many Nanguan associations had disappeared, and the tradition survived mainly within a limited number of local communities.

The status of Nanguan began to change in the late 1970s and 1980s. Following diplomatic setbacks such as Taiwan’s withdrawal from the United Nations in 1971 and the termination of diplomatic relations with the United States in 1979, Taiwanese society increasingly reconsidered questions of local identity and cultural heritage. This environment contributed to the rise of the nativist movement, which encouraged renewed interest in Taiwanese traditional culture.

Scholars and intellectuals subsequently began to document and study Nanguan through fieldwork, recording projects, and musicological research. Important academic studies published in the early 1980s analyzed Nanguan’s musical structure, historical development, and social significance, while the first International Nanguan Conference in 1981 further strengthened its academic recognition. During this period, Nanguan came to be understood not only as a local folk tradition but also as an important resource for the study of ancient Chinese music.

In the 1980s, Taiwan’s cultural policy also shifted significantly. With the establishment of the Council for Cultural Affairs in 1982, the government began actively promoting traditional arts and local cultural heritage. Nanguan gained particular cultural prestige because of its association with literati culture and elite social groups, as well as its unique position between Chinese and Taiwanese cultural identities. Supported by academic institutions and cultural organizations, Nanguan was promoted through festivals, educational programs, and public performances.

After the 1990s, Nanguan gradually came to be recognized as one of the representative forms of traditional Taiwanese music. Rather than being viewed solely as a remnant of Chinese culture, it increasingly came to symbolize Taiwan’s own historical and cultural identity. Today, Nanguan represents both continuity with the past and the evolving cultural identity of Taiwan.
