= New Taiwanese Song =

New Taiwanese Song is a genre of Taiwanese popular music. It was first used to describe pop songs, often dealing with political themes or social criticism, that followed the upheavals of 1989. Songs of Madness by Blacklist Studio was one of the first and most prominent releases in this genre. Chen Ming-chang, Lim Giong, and New Formosa Band are other major musicians in this realm. The record label Crystal Records was responsible for producing many of these musicians.
