= Nakasi =

Traditional music form in Taiwan and Japan

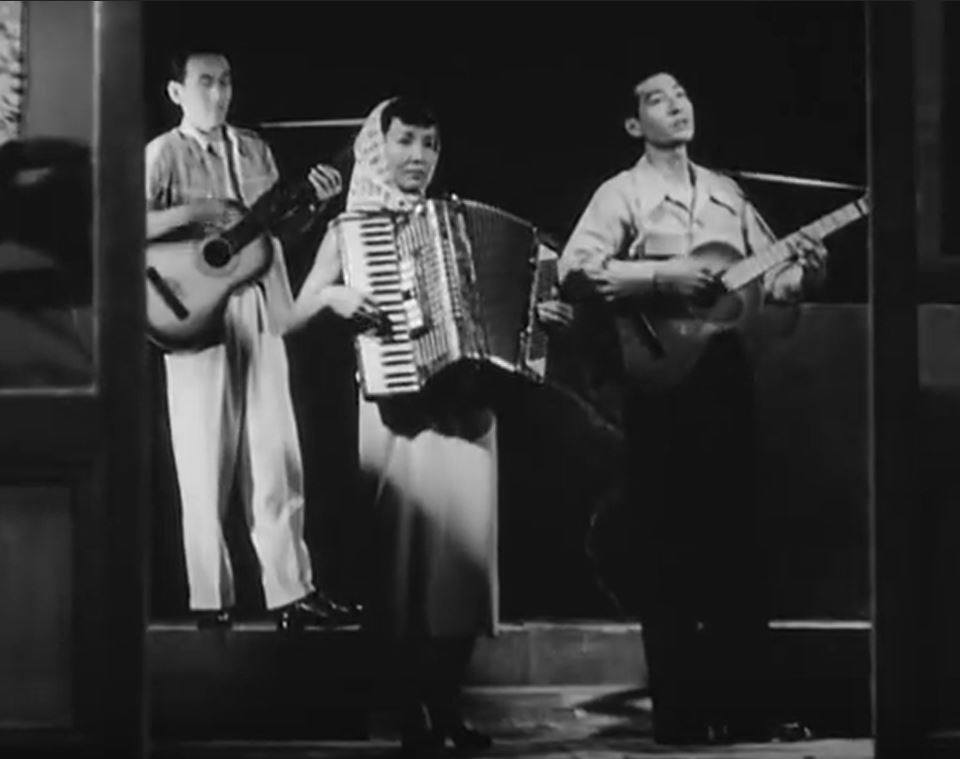
A Nagashi band in a 1953 Japanese drama film Tokyo Story

Nakasi (Chinese: 那卡西; pinyin: nàkǎxī) or Nagashi (Japanese: 流し) is a traditional popular music form in Japan and Taiwan, most stereotypically associated with elements of working-class culture such as the old tea parlors and drinking bars. One explanation supposes that the word describes the migratory lifestyle of Nakasi musicians, who traditionally travelled from one tea parlor to another.

Lin Sheng-hsiang (林生祥) of Labor Exchange Band has described the style as "a very rustic and urban-rooty form of music, normally with a keyboard, which has replaced the accordion, and drums accompanying the singers." The form is a favorite of pro-labor bands and musical groups. One of the most prominent groups, Blackhand Nakasi, is named after it.
