= Teochew Clown =

Role in Teochew opera

Teochew Clown (潮丑) refers to the clown role in Teochew opera and is regarded as the soul of the art form; the local saying "without the clown, there is no play" (無丑不成戲) highlights not only the clown's central position in dramatic structure but also its deep cultural roots.

Unlike other theatrical traditions, the clown in Teochew opera controls the rhythm of performance, linking scenes and adjusting atmosphere through humour so that the elegance of the sheng and dan roles is balanced by lively, grounded energy, giving the entire play a vivid, three‑dimensional texture. Clowns speak in expressive Teochew dialect, echoing the saying "old clowns speak plain speech" (老丑呾白話), where "plain speech" (白話) means both truthful words and vernacular Teochew; this gives the role strong satirical and entertaining power, allowing it to voice the concerns of ordinary people and expose corruption or social injustice from the perspective of common townsfolk. As cultural transmitters, Teochew clowns weave folk stories and moral teachings into colloquial performance, and they often improvise based on audience reactions, atmosphere, or even current news, inserting local idioms or sayings as needed. This improvisational freedom makes the clown the only role able to step outside the dramatic frame and "speak directly" (對話) to the audience, turning its vernacular speech into a bridge between stage and reality.

== Uniqueness ==
Teochew opera differs from many other regional theatre forms in that a large number of its acts and scences feature the clown as the protagonist, making it a genre that truly "excels through the clown" (以丑見長). Compared with Peking opera and other local traditions, the Teochew clown shows clear distinctions in appearance, sub‑categories, and performance techniques. In Teochew opera, the clown is revered as the "soul of the play" (戲魂), and the popular saying "without the clown, there is no play" reflects how the clown often controls the rhythm of the entire performance and can even determine its success or failure. Within traditional troupes, the clown holds extremely high status and is usually performed by the most senior artists. In Peking opera, although the clown is important, the role mainly supplements the sheng, dan, and jing roles, providing comic relief and adjusting the atmosphere; its performance is largely supportive, and even with some improvisation, it remains a secondary role in the overall structure.

Many Chinese theatre forms, such as Peking opera, divide clowns into only three basic types: civil clowns (文丑, requiring little martial skill), martial clowns (武丑, requiring acrobatics), and female clowns (彩旦). Teochew opera, however, is different: its clown roles can be divided into "ten major types," sometimes even more, each with its own distinctive costume, performance techniques, such as the fan skills of the "long‑gown clown" (項衫丑), and footwork, such as animal‑imitating steps like the duck‑waddle (鴨母行) and "geckos crawling on the wall" (錢龍貼壁). Such finely detailed classification is rarely seen in other genres.

Linguistically, Teochew opera also stands apart: while other theatre forms use relatively little local slang, puns, or proverbs, Teochew opera—deeply rooted in the Teochew dialect—makes extensive use of all three, achieving a style that is popular yet never vulgar. Moreover, because Teochew opera descends from the Southern Drama of the Song and Yuan dynasties, its clown performance preserves many features of early Southern theatre, especially in comic interludes and improvisational humour.

== Classification ==
Teochew clowns are classified according to a character's social status, personality, costume, and stylistic techniques, vividly shaping comic or streetwise figures such as officials, commoners, warriors, and beggars. These can be divided into ten distinct types, forming the unique "Ten Clowns" system found only in Teochew opera. Alongside the saying "without the clown, there is no play," Teochew also has the phrase "without skill, there is no clown" (無技不成丑), reflecting how clowns are renowned for their specialised techniques; many of these skills exist only in Teochew opera, such as the sliding‑ladder stunt in The Firewood Shed Encounter (柴房會) and the fan techniques required of the xiangshan clown. The clown's distinctive "phlegm‑fire voice" (痰火聲, a resonant throat sound) and natural, colloquial Teochew speech make the characters vivid and full of everyday life. In the classic Teochew opera excerpt The Firewood Shed Encounter, the male lead Li Laosan is a typical clown role, yet performing him requires the actor to move across multiple clown subtypes—using the physical skills of the martial clown, embodying the appearance of the fur‑cap clown (裘頭丑), and conveying the spirit of the old clown (老丑). This fusion of "technique and character" (技與戲) represents the highest artistic realm of the Teochew clown and is the key to why great performers such as Fang Zhanrong (方展榮) were able to bring the role fully to life.

=== Official‑Robe Clown ===
The official‑robe clown (官袍丑), also called "robe‑and‑sash clown because the actor wear a long, wide‑sleeved official robe, with a sash on it and a winged hat, specialises in portraying comic or negative figures among ancient civil officials, with personalities ranging widely from the self‑important, greedy, and incompetent "seventh‑rank petty magistrate" to cunning court jesters and powerful, treacherous ministers. A classic example is the post‑station officer (驛丞) in the excerpt Liu Yong Inspects Jiangnan from The Tale of Lady Golden Flower. This post‑station officeris one of the most representative official‑robe clown roles—sleazy, pompous, and full of bureaucratic airs—and is considered a foundational character that every Teochew clown performer must learn. It is also essential for advancing technical skill, as the performance demands strict precision: the actor must show both the pedantic absurdity of an official and the refined technique of the clown role.

When portraying the post‑station officer, the actor uses clown‑specific footwork such as the "short steps" or "official steps," creating a sharp contrast between the character's arrogance toward commoners and his grovelling submissiveness before powerful figures like Liu Yong. In scenes showing the post‑station officer's opportunistic flattery, the actor exaggerates movements to express his panic upon discovering Liu Yong's true identity—often shaking the "winged" official hat or fussily adjusting his robe to reveal the character's hypocrisy and cowardice. Some renowned Teochew clowns, such as Fang Zhanrong, enrich the role by borrowing movements from puppetry, shadow theatre, or even animals (like mantises or monkeys), making the performance livelier, more regionally distinctive, and more grounded in everyday life.

=== Long‑Gown Clown ===
The long‑gown clown (項衫丑) in Teochew opera portrays young clown characters who wear the long scholar's gown. These roles are typically frivolous playboys, idle and uneducated sons of wealthy families, or fallen gentry. Performing them requires exceptional fan technique to express their vanity, flirtatiousness, and self‑important cleverness. In Teochew opera, the long‑gown garment is a traditional outfit representing the identity of scholars, young gentlemen, or literati. It is a type of informal attire—simple, elegant, and usually worn by male characters. In terms of structure, function, and use, the xiangshan resembles the xuezi (褶子) robe in Peking opera, making it a regional variation of that costume type.

Actors playing the long‑gown clown sometimes imitate animal movements to show the character's reactions in different situations. One of the most iconic examples is Hu Lian in Mess About Hairpin (鬧釵), the most representative role of this subtype and one of the most technically demanding. When performing Hu Lian—a frivolous young rake who finds a golden hairpin and suspects his sister of having an affair, then storms around the house in self‑satisfied outrage—the actor must demonstrate deep mastery of fan technique. The folding fan is held in the right hand, half concealed within the sleeve, and its opening, closing, and shaking express Hu Lian's inner tension, smugness, or arrogance. Combined with stylised stage steps and waist movements, classic actions such as the "fan‑swaying walk" (搖扇台步) require precise coordination of footwork and posture to outline the character's shallow and deceitful personality.

The performer widens the eyes and rapidly shifts the gaze, imitating a mouse peeking out of its hole—nervous, curious, and alert. The actor may also mimic a mouse "sniffing" for food, lowering the head to sniff around the floor or under the table in search of the hairpin's scent. These exaggerated, animal‑inspired movements greatly enhance the comedic effect and are a hallmark of the xiangshan clown's lively, expressive style.

=== Long‑Robe Clown ===
The long‑robe clown in Teochew opera mainly portrays lower‑class figures or ordinary townsfolk who wear long gowns. The range of characters is broad, often including people who think too highly of themselves, pedantic scholars, misers, or those who flatter the powerful. They may be small vendors, shop assistants, impoverished scholars, or rustic villagers, as well as lower‑middle‑class literati, merchants, or stewards who possess some social standing or cultural literacy but whose personalities are stubborn, comical, or sly. Among these, blind characters form a particularly distinctive subtype. The long‑robe clown typically wears a long robe and a small cap, clearly distinguishing them from the "official‑robe clown" who wears government attire, or the "fur‑cap clown" (裘頭丑) who wears short garments. Compared with the "ragged‑clothes clown" (褸衣丑), who represents the very bottom of society, the long‑robe clown appears relatively "tidy," yet the humor arises from the sharp contrast between the character's behavior and social identity.

The performance style of the long‑robe clown is varied but always grounded in everyday life. Beyond portraying blind characters, it includes many gestures and movements that reflect the daily interests and habits of common people. Performing the physicality of a blind person is one of the most important and distinctive traditional skills of the long‑robe clown. Its core lies in "expressing spirit rather than appearance," using subtle bodily language to simulate the characteristic movements of someone with visual impairment. The key features of the long‑robe clown's blind‑person technique are the eye work (目色) and the footwork (腳法). When portraying a blind character (known in Teochew as tshiaⁿ‑mê), the performer usually keeps the eyes closed, yet must still use specific "eye techniques" to convey the character's inner world. Common methods include rolling the eyes upward to show the whites, or maintaining a long, unfocused "fixed gaze" to express the concentration and emptiness that follow the loss of sight. To mimic the blind person's reliance on hearing—"using the ears in place of the eyes"—the performer often tilts the head, listens intently, and leans the upper body slightly forward, creating a dynamic sense of "listening sideways." The Teochew opera Double Blind (雙青盲) is a highly representative clown play, and its protagonist Lin Tiande is a classic example of the long‑robe clown role type. In Double Blind and other well‑known works, actors like Lin Tiande (林添德) use large, searching gestures and exaggerated balancing movements to achieve a blend of comedy and realism.

=== Martial Clown ===
The martial clown (武丑) is presented as one of the most visually engaging branches of the clown role category, combining physical technique with humor. In Teochew opera, the defining feature of the martial clown is agility. Martial clowns typically portray characters who possess exceptional skills yet remain humorous in temperament—figures such as chivalrous thieves, young warriors, or highly capable attendants. In Chinese opera, the martial clown is also known as opening‑mouth jumper (開口跳), a name that reflects two traits: strong martial ability and a performance style dominated by spoken lines rather than singing. This requires the performer to have an excellent martial foundation, as the role involves a large number of demanding movements—falls, dives, flips, and combat sequences—while still maintaining clear, articulate speech during intense physical exertion.

In makeup, the martial clown typically applies a small patch of white powder on the bridge of the nose (小花臉), symbolizing cleverness, agility, or comic flair. Martial clown performers in Teochew opera often employ distinctive techniques such as the "shadow‑puppet step" (皮影步), as well as skills involving props.

The Teochew opera Blocking the Horse (擋馬) is a highly representative traditional martial‑clown play. In this work, the martial clown, portraying Jiao Guangpu (焦光普), forms the dramatic core of the entire production. The role is exceptionally demanding, requiring extreme physical stamina and agility. Blocking the Horse is not only a high‑intensity martial‑arts drama but also a pinnacle example of the coordinated interplay between the female martial role (武旦) and the martial clown. In Blocking the Horse, the martial clown must perform advanced "chair techniques" (椅子功). Jiao Guangpu executes flips, leaps, jumps, falls, and dives on and around a chair. Typical movements include flipping off the chair in a confined space, performing handstands, and executing aerial motions atop the chair—physical expressions of the character's alertness and skill as he tests Yang Bajie (楊八姐). The Teochew version of Blocking the Horse incorporates local martial‑arts elements, including movements from Southern Chinese martial arts. Its pacing is tighter and more explosive than the Beijing‑opera version, emphasizing sudden power and dynamic bursts. Jiao Guangpu must not only fight but also speak. After intense combat and chair acrobatics, the performer must still deliver spoken lines with clarity and wit, expressing the character's intelligence and restraint. The martial clown and the female martial role portraying Yang Bajie share extensive partner choreography, engaging in mutual testing without revealing their identities. Their movements must align perfectly, including synchronized footwork, combat exchanges, and tightly coordinated fight sequences.

=== Shoe‑Kicking Clown ===
The Shoe‑Kicking Clown (踢鞋丑) is one of the most distinctive and life‑infused branches of the Teochew clown roles. It typically portrays small, lower‑class characters who are humorous in temperament and exaggerated in movement, or clown figures placed in specific comic situations. The core of the Shoe‑Kicking Clown's performance is the stylized technique known as "shoe‑kicking." Through precise and agile foot control, the performer kicks the cloth shoe off the foot and sends it into the air, allowing it to land accurately back in place or onto a designated spot—such as the head or shoulder. Combined with expressions of panic, pride, or comic embarrassment, this technique reveals the character's humor and earthy, streetwise quality.

Performers also use the "shadow‑puppet step," a highly decorative and playful footwork pattern in Teochew clown performance. It imitates the stiff yet lively movement of shadow‑puppet figures, with the arms and legs swinging in a mechanically rhythmic manner, creating a comic effect that feels "human yet not human, puppet yet not puppet" (似人非人、似偶非偶).

In Stabbing Liang Xiang (刺梁驤), the character Wan Jiachun (萬家春) uses alternating sequences of shadow‑puppet steps and shoe‑kicking techniques to push the expression of "utter panic" to its extreme. The artistic logic lies in the sharp contrast between mechanical stiffness and uncontrollable chaos. For example, when Wan Jiachun witnesses an assassination or finds himself surrounded, the shock produces a sense of "the soul leaving the body." The performer uses the shadow‑puppet step to simulate a feeling of being manipulated from outside: the body held straight, limbs swinging stiffly like iron rods, as if the character has lost all willpower and is driven only by instinctive terror. Some performers, when portraying Wan Jiachun's frantic escape, deliberately incorporate shoe‑dropping and mid‑air shoe‑catching. By using precise toe control to make the shoe "accidentally" fly off, they highlight the character's frantic, scatterbrained desperation during the escape.

=== Female Clown ===
The female clown (女丑) is a highly individualized clown/comic role type whose defining quality is "finding beauty within the clown" (丑中見美). The role covers a wide range of characters, most often lower‑class or working-class women, or middle‑aged and elderly women with strong personalities—matchmakers, wet nurses, shopkeepers, kitchen women, or fierce, sharp‑tongued wives. Through humorous, exaggerated, and sometimes cunning or worldly performances, the actress conveys satire about human greed, snobbery, and other moral flaws, fulfilling opera's traditional function of "entertaining while educating" (寓教於樂).

The female clown performance is centered on acting and movement, with relatively little singing. The physical vocabulary is highly exaggerated and rooted in everyday life, often using oversized props such as large handkerchiefs or long tobacco pipes. Although singing is limited, spoken lines require exceptional clarity. A female clown performer must articulate crisply and deliver lines with the lively, earthy flavor characteristic of the "old‑clown vernacular" (老丑白話) style. The makeup of the female clown is known as "small painted face", typically featuring a patch of white powder on the bridge of the nose. Costumes are brightly colored, even deliberately "vulgar" (俗氣), and the hairstyle reflects strong local Teochew traditions, forming a sharp contrast with the refined elegance of the male roles (生角) and female roles (旦角).

Historically, the female clown in Teochew opera was always performed by male actors in cross‑gender clown roles, such as the renowned Hong Miao (洪妙). This cross‑casting demands great skill: the performance must not feel awkward or forced simply because the actor is male. Instead, the actor must deconstruct feminine gestures and temperament with precision, using this heightened stylization to achieve an even stronger comedic effect.

In the excerpt Yang Ziliang Demands to Marry the Maiden from The Tale of Su Liu Niang, Liao Wenqing (廖文卿) —celebrated as a master of the female clown role—casts as the "wet nurse." Her portrayal of this middle‑aged woman, who is both a caretaker and a matchmaker, is deeply nuanced. Rather than relying on crude humor, she uses refined physical technique to depict a woman who is protective of her mistress, streetwise, yet warm and approachable. Her footwork, such as the "short‑person step" and delicate feminine shuffling, along with gestures like fan‑waving and handkerchief flourishes, carry rich expressive flavor. Liao Wenqing's spoken delivery is rhythmically sharp and infused with local Teochew humor. In her exchanges with Taohua (桃花), the maid of the Su household, her verbal sparring is witty and comedic, perfectly embodying the Teochew‑opera aesthetic of being both theatrical and grounded in everyday life.

=== Fur‑Cap Clown ===
The Fur‑Cap Clown (裘頭丑) primarily portrays laboring people at the bottom of society—porters, boat trackers, street vendors, shop assistants, and similar figures. These characters are usually straightforward, honest, and good‑natured, and they often possess quick, agile physicality. The performer's signature costume includes a soft headpiece called the fur‑cap, a turban‑like cap, along with short jacket and trousers, a long sash tied at the waist, and straw or cloth shoes, all designed to allow large, vigorous movements. The fur‑cap clown demands considerable technical skill. Its performance emphasizes body technique and martial movement, requiring the actor to execute difficult actions such as flips, ladder climbing, and shoe‑kicking.

In the famous play The Firewood Shed Encounter, the character Li Laosan (李老三) is typically performed as a fur‑cap clown. When Li Laosan encounters Mo Ernang (莫二娘), he uses brilliant "ladder climbing" and "panic" sequences to achieve a style that is comic but never crude—"beauty within the clown"—using exaggerated movement and witty spoken lines to portray the hardship and optimism of a small person at the bottom of society. The fur‑cap clown places strong emphasis on physical technique and martial agility. Li Laosan must perform extremely demanding "ladder skills"—flips on the ladder, hanging upside down, startled slips—embodying the highly dynamic nature of this clown subtype. Classic performances include the contemporary Teochew clown master Fang Zhanrong's portrayal of Li Laosan in The Firewood Shed Encounter. Fang's teacher, the late Li Youcun (李有存), was also a renowned master of the fur‑cap clown and other Teochew clown roles.

The main distinction between the fur‑cap clown and the ragged‑clothes clown (褸衣丑) lies in their thematic focus. The ragged‑clothes clown emphasizes extreme poverty, timidity, wretchedness, desperation, and physical frailty—even destitution. The fur‑cap clown, by contrast, highlights the diligence, humor, and vitality of laborers, with large, energetic movements and highly technical physical skills.

=== Ragged‑Clothes Clown ===
The Ragged‑Clothes Clown (褸衣丑)—sometimes also called the Ragged Clown (褸丑) or Blue‑Gown Clown (藍衫丑)—is a major branch of the Teochew clown roles. It typically portrays characters of low social status who live in poverty and wear tattered clothing: impoverished scholars, beggars, night watchmen, ruined gentry, fortune‑tellers, or long‑wandering drifters. The performer usually wears a long blue or dark‑green cloth gown, called lu² i¹ (褸衣) in Teochew, along with a square kerchief or felt cap. The appearance is shabby and bookish, often tinged with pedantry or comic pretension. Performers use small, exaggerated movements—refined fan manipulation, delicate footwork, and fussy gestures—to express the character's awkwardness, embarrassment, or self‑importance. Spoken delivery is central: lines are delivered in Teochew dialect, with a humorous tone, sharp or sarcastic wording, and frequent improvisation. This allows the actor to vividly portray impoverished, down‑and‑out intellectuals, frustrated scholars, or petty townsfolk who are morally dubious and eager to curry favor. At times, these characters also reveal the hardship and resilience of the lower classes, making the ragged‑clothes clown one of the most resonant and lifelike figures in Teochew opera. Many of Fang Zhanrong's celebrated performances include outstanding examples of this role type.

In contrast to the long‑gown clown, who plays elegant, flirtatious literati, the ragged‑clothes clown focuses on characters who are "poor, pedantic, and sly" (窮、酸、滑). In the classic Teochew opera Double Blind, the character Gim Gui Sia (金貴舍, Sia in Teochew means young lord or young master of a rich household) — born blind in one eye— is a representative ragged‑clothes clown. He embodies the type's signature traits: poor yet vain, fallen yet frivolous. Once a wealthy young master, Gim Gui Sia squandered his family fortune through gambling and ended up destitute and ragged. Despite his miserable circumstances, he clings to the vanity and slick mannerisms of his former privileged life. Although classified as a ragged‑clothes clown, the performance often incorporates the lightness of the shoe‑kicking clown and the lingering scholarly airs of the long‑gown clown. He wears a torn long gown yet constantly tries to pose like a gentleman—this sharp contrast is the source of the character's humor.

In some interpretations, Li Laosan from The Firewood Shed Encounter is also played as a ragged‑clothes clown. Li Laosan is a small vendor in Bianjing (汴京) whose business is failing and whose life is difficult. After missing the curfew, he can only afford to stay in the cheapest, most dilapidated woodshed of the inn. Through masterful ladder techniques, the performer captures the character's cramped, anxious, yet fundamentally kind nature with great depth.

=== Old Clown ===
The Old Clown is a role type defined primarily by age, forming a distinctive branch of the chou category that focuses on expressing the physical and psychological traits of elderly men through a blend of strong local flavor and highly trained body technique. These characters are typically elderly men from the lower social strata—old servants, night watchmen, ferrymen—whose appearance includes a white "tofu‑block" patch painted on the face (a form of small painted face, 小花臉) and white or grey beard pieces known as binkou (髕口), referring to makeup around the mouth. Although clown roles are known for humor, the old clown follows strict performance conventions, requiring mastery of the "six essentials" (singing, speaking, acting, combat, eye technique, and footwork) while maintaining a strongly expressive, semi‑abstract style. The vocal delivery is distinctive, often using full voice, double‑twist voice (雙拗聲), or a raspy "phlegm‑fire" tone (痰火聲) to convey the aged or humorous qualities of elderly male characters.

Old clown performers also draw inspiration from animal movement and folk arts—masters such as Li Youcun observed monkeys and mantises and incorporated elements of shadow‑puppet and puppet movement to create performances that are rhythmic, flexible, and richly textured. Whereas most clown roles rely on quick, mischievous eye work, the old clown adds a touch of dullness or sluggishness to reflect age. The performance style emphasizes steadiness, weight, and agedness, using crouched or trembling steps to simulate an elderly person's unsteady gait, and the characters are typically warm‑hearted, humorous, and worldly, with a calmness shaped by long experience. A representative example is the ferryman in The Tale of Su Liu Niang, excerpt Peach Blossom Takes the Ferry.

=== Young Clown ===
The Young Clown (小丑) in Teochew opera's "Ten Clowns" system is a distinct subtype whose character identity, performance technique, and dramatic function differ clearly from other clown roles. It typically portrays young, lively, lower‑status figures such as mischievous children, clever young servants, or spirited street youths, and is often used to enliven the stage, link scenes together, and provide comic interludes, with personalities that are generally simple, bright, and cheerful. Although it shares the "white‑nose" makeup of other clowns, the facial lines for young clown roles are cleaner and more fluid to match their youthful, alert expression. Because the role represents young characters, the spoken delivery is crisp, loud, and fast-paced, conveying youthful energy, while the physical technique is characterized by lightness, agility, and liveliness, with large, exaggerated movements that often include flips, jumps, and actions approaching those of the Martial Clown, emphasizing childlike playfulness or adolescent vigor. Despite this overlap, the key difference between the young clown and the martial clown is that the latter focuses on solid martial‑arts foundations and combat choreography, whereas the young clown centers on everyday comic movement and humor.
