= Peach Blossom Takes the Ferry =

Peach Blossom Takes the Ferry (Chinese: 桃花過渡; pinyin: Táohuā guòdù; Pe̍h-ūe-jī: Thô-hue kuè-tōu) is a well-known act in the Teochew opera The Tale of Su Liu Niang (蘇六娘). The same act also appears in Nanguan music, Cheguzhen performance and Hakka opera.

== Origin ==
It is believed that the act "Peach Blossom Takes the Ferry" was originally part of the Teochew opera The Tale of Su Liu Niang. However, it was also disputed that this act or the storyline was not found in the operatic performance of the tale in Ming Dynasty. Some argued that the storyline was taken from a folk song "Girl Takes the Ferry" (少女過渡) and was adapted and incorporated into the tale.

== Plot ==
The act tells the story of Peach Blossom (the beloved maid of Su Liu Niang) taking a ferry across the river and her interactions with an old ferryman. The act is usually performed by a Dan role (Miss Peach Blossom) and a Teochew Clown role (the Ferryman). In the act, the two sing ballads, perform simple dance moves, crack jokes and make witty and humorous exchanges in between songs and moves. In the old days when farming was a main form of economic activity, the act not only was popular village theaters but also a highlighted performance in rural rituals and worshipping activities (神功戲).

In most performances, the act has lyrics for each of the twelve lunar months. The two actors take turns to describe the scenery of the lunar month. The ferryman keeps trying to make fun of Peach Blossom in words, and Peach Blossom continues to fight back. In some Teochew opera, the song is only sung until May. This play was originally derived from the folk tune "Lantern Song" (燈籠歌) (also known as "Red Lantern Song" (燈紅歌).

The act was also widely used in contemporary works. Singers, such as Liu Fuzhu (劉福助) and Jody Chiang covered the tune of the act in their songs. Sound artist Heng Chunxi (恆春兮) interspersed the tune and used it as background music in his works.

In the Teochew version of the act, after singing "Lantern Song", the actors will then sing "Earthworm Song" (蚯蚓歌). The lyric of the song is about some common objects people see or use in their daily lives. In the act, the ferryman starts off the song with earthworms and questions Peach Blossom why earthworms can make sound. Peach Blossom then explains that earthworms live and grow in soil, therefore it can make sounds. The ferryman then asks why mud crabs (in Teochew 田蟹) which also live and grow in soil cannot make sounds. Peach Blossom answers this question by citing the unique feature on a mud crab's tummy which preventing it from making a sound. Based on Peach Blossom's answer, the ferryman raises another question and asks her to explain why the object he mentioned can or cannot make a sound. The song goes on and on in a series of fast-paced questions and answers. In the end, the ferryman accidentally says that the gong (銅鑼) is made of iron and thus loses the contest.

In Quanzhou, there is also a folk song called "Peach Blossom Takes the Ferry". The song tells the story of Su Liu Niang and describes the scenes of the four seasons. It has nothing to do with the "Lantern Song" and "Earthworm Song" as appear in the Teochew version of the act.

== Artistic features ==
The brilliance of "Peach Blossom Takes the Ferry" lies in the "song duel" between Peach Blossom and the Ferryman. Following the structure of the Teochewfolk ballad The Twelve-Month Song, the two characters sing in antiphonal style, using the scenery, seasons, and folk customs of each month as their themes. Through wit and musical sparring, their personalities come vividly to life. The play emphasizes the equal importance of singing and movement: the actors' physical vocabulary includes intricate footwork, leg techniques, and the highly distinctive performances of paddle‑wielding and umbrella‑dancing. Peach Blossom belongs to the dan (female) role type; she carries a parasol, and her movements are graceful and varied—sometimes closing like a tender bud, sometimes opening like a blooming flower. The Ferryman belongs to the clown role type; he carries a boat paddle, and his movements twist and hop, forming a lively contrast with Peach Blossom's umbrella dance and evoking the rustic charm of village life. The overall atmosphere is light and joyful, portraying the affectionate, humorous interaction between a clever young girl and a kind, playful old man. To make the script more cohesive, modern productions often transform the originally tragic background into a comedic one, creating an artistic style described as "dragon's head, phoenix's tail". The vocal style of the play is distinctly Teochewin flavor—melodic, lively, and rich in local slang, giving it the color of folk song. Over the past several decades, the play has been refined by generations of artists, such as Fang Zhanrong (方展榮) and Chen Wanxi (陳玩惜), evolving from the simple antiphonal singing of the pre‑1910s into a technically mature and highly entertaining classic.

== Characters ==
=== Peach Blossom ===
In "Peach Blossom Takes the Ferry", the character Peach Blossom represents the liveliness and beauty of the traditional Teochew opera cai-luo-yi-dan (彩羅衣旦, literally means "female role in colorful silk garments"). Her artistic qualities form a sharp contrast with the Ferryman's rough humor. Her umbrella dance is the core of her dynamic aesthetics. The floral parasol is her signature prop, mirroring the Ferryman's paddle. The performance revolves around this umbrella: the actress must manipulate it with agility—spinning, opening, closing, carrying it on the shoulder—to mimic the rocking and balancing of a ferryboat in motion. The umbrella becomes an extension of her body language, expressing shyness, pride, or warding off the Ferryman's teasing, all imbued with feminine charm. Her appearance and movement emphasize youthful charm. Traditionally, she wears brightly colored shan-ku (衫袴, short jacket and wide trousers), with an embroidered apron and silk handkerchief—simple yet pretty. Her footwork uses light "shuffling steps" (碎步) or "cloud steps" (雲步), simulating the ferry's rocking within a small stage space. Her posture must be soft yet springy. Her cleverness shines in the "song duel". Peach Blossom is the "brains" of the play; her singing and expressions must convey intelligence and quick wit. In the "Twelve-Month Song" exchange, she must not only respond to the Ferryman's provocations but also counterattack with sharp humor. This verbal sparring requires confidence and brisk delivery. She triumphs over strength with wit, winning the Ferryman's respect—an image of the "clever folk girl" beloved by audiences. Her vocal style demands a clear, sweet tone. Compared with the Ferryman's slightly hoarse or robust clown singing, Peach Blossom's voice is crisp and melodious, reflecting youthful vitality. The rhythms are lively, often set to bright folk-style tunes that highlight her cheerful rural character.

Modern performers—such as Wu Yudong—place special emphasis on eye expression. When she exchanges glances with the Ferryman, her eyes must carry mischief and playfulness, bringing the drama to life.

==== Wu Yudong ====
In Teochew opera, National First-Class Actress Wu Yudong's portrayal of Peach Blossom is one of the most representative modern interpretations of "Peach Blossom Takes the Ferry". Her style not only preserves the essence of the traditional huadan but also forms exceptional artistic chemistry with the renowned clown actor Fang Zhanrong. Her umbrella technique is a modern refinement of tradition. The umbrella becomes almost a living partner—opening, closing, spinning, resting on the shoulder—sometimes like a budding flower, sometimes like one in full bloom, precisely echoing the ferry's rhythm on water. She achieves unity of body and umbrella, seamlessly blending traditional steps (shuffling, cloud steps) with umbrella movements to portray a light, youthful figure that contrasts delightfully with the Ferryman's rugged paddling. Wu Yudong's Peach Blossom is not merely a farm girl but a spirited, intelligent young woman—"lively, elegant, and charming". In the song duel, her gaze conveys teasing confidence, perfectly showing how Peach Blossom outwits the flirtatious Ferryman. Her performance aims for "playful but never vulgar", balancing girlish coyness with the dignity and refinement expected of a huadan. Her excellent vocal quality allows her to shine in this song‑and‑dance‑heavy play. Her singing is clear and pleasant, with crisp diction and strong rhythmic sense, especially in the "Twelve-Month Song". Through subtle vocal shifts, she expresses Peach Blossom's inner thoughts, giving the character vivid life within the joyful atmosphere.

=== Ferryman ===
The Ferryman is not only the dramatic engine of the story but also a showcase of the clown role in Teochew opera. His most iconic feature is the dance‑like paddling movement. The Ferryman's performance emphasizes singing and dancing, with the imaginary paddling motion as its hallmark. Rhythm is crucial: the paddling must match the music, forming a lively contrast with Peach Blossom's umbrella dance. His footwork includes twists, hops, and sways, expressing the motion of a boatman navigating the water. These movements blend realism with stylization—rooted in daily life but artistically transformed into humorous, rhythmic dance. As an "old clown" (老丑), the Ferryman's humor and seasoned personality are essential. His appearance is distinctive: a bamboo hat, a dab of white clown makeup on the nose (the "tofu block"), and sometimes long whiskers, creating a comical look. His personality is cheerful, experienced, mischievous, and fond of lively situations. Though slightly flirtatious and playful, he is fundamentally warm‑hearted and helpful. The most representative performer is the Teochew clown (潮丑) master Fang Zhanrong, whose style is praised for being "smooth as flowing clouds, lively and natural". His interactions with Peach Blossom reveal rich layers of emotion and humor. The song duel is the soul of the play. Actors often improvise, using quick wit to enliven the performance. In the "Twelve-Month Song", when Peach Blossom gains the upper hand, the Ferryman may even invent a "thirteenth month" to save face—an example of the clever comedic design of Teochew opera. His vocal style must be bright, resonant, and rhythmically precise. Even as a Teochew clown, he must maintain musicality. Clear diction is essential to deliver the humor embedded in the lyrics.

==== Fang Zhanrong ====
Fang Zhanrong's portrayal of the Ferryman is defined by dance‑infused movement. His greatest contribution is enriching the character's physical vocabulary, transforming the older, more restrained style into something dynamic and expressive. His paddling movements integrate footwork and body posture so deeply that paddling becomes not just a labor simulation but a visually captivating dance. His style is praised as "appealing to both refined and popular tastes". He masters comedic timing—funny but never crude. Although the Ferryman likes to joke and take advantage, Fang insists on "clean" performance (meaning pure, not vulgar), making the character lovable and full of humanity. His improvisational energy and expressive eyes create strong rapport with the audience, filling the stage with the warmth of everyday life. As a renowned Teochew clown, his singing is highly recognizable. His rhythm is precise, and in the famous "Twelve-Month Song", he maintains excellent rapport with Peach Blossom (such as Wu Yudong). His vocal phrasing vividly expresses the Ferryman's emotional shifts—from initial confidence to eventual humorous defeat. Fang Zhanrong sees "Peach Blossom Takes the Ferry" as a distilled expression of Chaoshan culture. Through the Ferryman, he conveys the optimism, wit, and humor characteristic of Chaoshan people.

== Derivative culture ==
The song of "Peach Blossom takes the Ferry" is slow and long, so in Teochew, Fujian and Taiwan to describe those who are lazy at work, there is a saying that "Eat like Wu Song punching the tiger, talk about money like fighting Lu Bu three times, work like Peach Blossom taking the ferry" (食飯，武松拍虎；提錢，三戰呂布；做工課，桃花過渡), or "Eat like Wu Song punching the tiger, work like Peach Blossom taking the ferry" (食若武松打虎，做若桃花過渡).
