= Mess About Hairpin =

Mess About Hairpin《鬧釵》is a classic Teochew opera one‑act play adapted from the Ming‑dynasty legend (傳奇) The Banana‑Leaf Handkerchief (蕉帕記). It belongs to the clown-role tradition, especially the subtype "long‑gown clown" (項衫丑), and is celebrated – together with The Window Sweeping Encounter (掃窗會) and Madam Yang Argues the Case (楊令婆辯本) – as one of the "Three Jewels of Teochew Opera" (潮劇三塊寶石).

== Characters ==
=== Hu Lian ===
Hu Lian (胡璉) is the core clown figure of the act. A spoiled, arrogant, uneducated young master, vain and suspicious by nature. After picking up a gold hairpin outside the scholar Longsheng's house, he irrationally suspects his sister of having an illicit affair, triggering a farcical chain of events. In performance terms, Hu Lian is the representative role of the "long‑gown clown", requiring superb fan technique – throwing, catching, spinning, and flipping – to express panic, pride, or embarrassment. The role is considered a benchmark for evaluating a clown actor's skill.

=== Xiao Ying ===
Xiao Ying (小英) is the clever maid and true driver of the plot. She is the Hu family's maid: sharp‑tongued, quick‑witted, bold, and unafraid to resist unreasonable authority. She is the engine of the story and, in many ways, its true soul. When Hu Lian makes baseless accusations, she not only refuses to submit but wagers with him: if the hairpin does not belong to his sister, he must accept thirty strokes of the rod. She exploits Hu Lian's forgetfulness and absurdity to make him suffer the consequences of his own foolishness. This sequence forms the comedic peak of the play. Artistically, Xiao Ying belongs to the cai-luo-yi-dan (彩羅衣旦, literally means female role in colorful silk garments) category – specifically the maidservant (走鬼仔 in Teochew) subtype – marked by lively, spirited, lifelike acting. She counters Hu Lian's nonsense with intelligence, humor, and a strong sense of justice.

=== Madam Hu ===
Madam Hu (胡母) is a gentle but indulgent mother. A kind elder who spoils her son a little too much. She stabilizes the situation and mediates conflicts, adding warmth and texture to this domestic comedy. When the truth finally emerges, she joins the others in scolding Hu Lian for his baseless suspicions.

=== Hu Jiaocui ===
Hu Jiaocui (胡嬌翠) is the wronged young lady in the act. She is Hu Lian's sister, raised with strict discipline and possessing a dignified, reserved temperament. She is unjustly implicated when her brother finds the hairpin and leaps to scandalous conclusions. In Teochew opera she belongs to the "boudoir dan" (閨門旦) category, emphasizing elegance, composure, and refined upbringing. Her brother's interrogation and humiliation leave her deeply aggrieved and indignant.

== Plot ==
The pampered rake Hu Lian, after a night of carousing with courtesans, returns home at dawn. Passing by the gate of his neighbour, the scholar Longsheng (書生龍生), he unexpectedly spots an exquisite gold hairpin lying by the roadside. Suspicious by nature and absurd in behaviour, he makes no effort to find the owner. Instead, because of his own habitual misconduct, his mind leaps to the idea that his sister must be having an illicit affair with Longsheng. He convinces himself that the hairpin was either a secret gift from his sister to Longsheng or incriminating evidence dropped during a clandestine rendezvous – proof, in his eyes, of their supposed liaison.

Seething with anger, Hu Lian storms into the inner quarters, ready to confront his mother and sister. He rushes to complain to Madam Hu, who tells him that, by coincidence, his sister has indeed lost a hairpin and has been searching for it in the back garden without success. Hu Lian immediately declares that his sister is involved with Longsheng. Madam Hu is unconvinced and decides to summon Hu's sister's personal maid, Xiao Ying, for questioning.

Xiao Ying appears. Madam Hu excuses herself to the back hall to rest, leaving Hu Lian free to interrogate the maid. Perceptive and quick-witted, Xiao Ying instantly recognises that Hu Lian is making trouble without cause. She insists that the young mistress spent the previous night in the back garden burning incense to pray for her mother's well-being and never left the house. Hu Lian beats and scolds her, but she repeats the same answer without wavering.

Infuriated, Hu Lian proposes a wager and asks Madam Hu to act as witness: if the gold hairpin belongs to his sister, Xiao Ying will be punished with thirty strokes of the bamboo board; if it does not, he will willingly accept the same punishment. They then summon the young mistress for confrontation.

During this scene, the actor playing Hu Lian performs intricate fan techniques – spinning, snapping the fan shut to point, and other flourishes – to portray his self‑important swagger and deluded certainty. This fan work forms the core performance highlight of the entire play.

Madam Hu and Xiao Ying watch as Hu Lian confronts his sister. Finally, he produces the hairpin as "evidence." But the young mistress explains that the hairpin is not hers: her phoenix‑shaped gold hairpins come as a matched pair, and the one she lost is the left pin. The one she is wearing—and the one in Hu Lian's hand—are both right pins. In the end, the missing left pin is found in the back garden, and the truth becomes clear.

Under his mother's scolding, Hu Lian must honour the wager. Xiao Ying thrashes him with the bamboo board, and he flees in utter humiliation.

== Fan technique ==
In Teochew opera, the folding fan is regarded as an extension of the actor's body. In the Mess About Hairpin, the fan work displayed by the character Hu Lian is considered exemplary, embodying the refined style of the "long‑gown clown". The role demands exceptionally high mastery of the clown's fundamental fan techniques, and the performance uses the fan's opening, closing, and transitional movements to externalize the character's shifting emotions. Renowned Teochew‑opera artists Cai Jinkun (蔡錦坤) and Huang Ruiying (黃瑞英) once captivated audiences with this play, and later the national‑level intangible‑heritage inheritor Fang Zhanrong (方展榮) carried on and further developed this tradition.

In Teochew opera, the folding fan is not merely a prop; it is a tool for projecting the character's inner monologue, arrogance, and eventual embarrassment. The Hairpin Farce showcases many of the key fan techniques, all of which require years of training to master. These include:

- Shaking the fan (抖扇) – When Hu Lian first discovers the hairpin, he uses rapid, jittery shaking of the fan to express his excitement and suspicion.
- Tossing the fan (拋扇) – A signature movement of Hu Lian. The performer tosses the fan into the air and catches it behind the back or in a stylized pose, highlighting Hu Lian's frivolous, rakish, and carefree personality.
- Hiding behind the fan (遮扇) – Covering the face with the fan while whispering or scheming, suggesting his sly and conniving nature.
- Striking the fan (擊扇) – Snapping the fan sharply to produce a crisp kada sound, used to emphasize a point in an argument or a moment of sudden realization.
- Combing with the fan (梳扇) – Using the closed fan to mimic combing or scratching the head, indicating confusion or frustration when events turn against him.
