= The Tale of Lady Golden Flower =

The Tale of Lady Golden Flower (金花女), also known as Golden Flower Shepherd (金花牧羊), is a cornerstone of the Chaoshan (Teochew) operatic repertoire and one of the most representative works of traditional Teochew opera. Revered as one of the "Three Masterpieces" of the genre (潮劇三寶), the play is admired for its exploration of loyalty, resilience, and moral righteousness. Its distinctive regional music, expressive performance style, and elegant lyrical melodies have made it a cultural touchstone in southern Chinese performing arts.

The story follows Lady Golden Flower, a noblewoman who, after enduring hardship, displacement, and long separation from her family, lives in exile as a shepherdess. Her journey embodies steadfast virtue and inner strength, culminating in eventual vindication and reunion. The opera is renowned for its emotional nuance, intricate costumes, and the evocative use of the Teochew dialect and traditional local instruments.

Often described as a "living fossil" of Teochew opera, the play holds exceptional value for the study of early Chinese theatre. Texts such as The Complete Collection of Lady Golden Flower in Teochew Tune (摘錦潮調金花女大全) are considered invaluable historical materials. The work has deep roots, with Ming Dynasty woodblock editions dating back to the Jiajing period (嘉靖年間). One such edition is preserved today in the National Library in Tokyo.

In the 1960s, playwright Liu Guanyao (劉管耀) adapted the widely known Raoping County version of the tale, drawing from both local storytelling traditions and the Ming woodblock text. His adaptation revitalized the classic for modern audiences and has since been performed more than a thousand times, securing its place as a beloved and enduring masterpiece.

== Plot ==
The Tale of Lady Golden Flower tells the story of a young woman from a wealthy household who chooses love and integrity over comfort and status. Despite her privileged upbringing, Golden Flower refuses to marry into wealth and instead pledges herself to Liu Yong (劉永), a gifted but impoverished scholar. Her brother supports the match, but his wife, the greedy and status‑obsessed Wu Shi (巫氏), vehemently opposes it, believing Liu Yong's poverty makes him unworthy.

Life after marriage is harsh. Liu Yong dreams of traveling to the capital to sit for the imperial examinations, but he lacks the money to make the journey. In desperation, he attempts to sell his writings, only to be mocked and humiliated. Golden Flower turns to her brother and sister‑in‑law for help, but Wu Shi responds with scorn. Secretly, her brother provides the funds, enabling Liu Yong to pursue his ambitions. Unwilling to let her husband face hardship alone, Golden Flower insists on accompanying him.

On the road to the capital, tragedy strikes. Bandits attack, and in the chaos the couple is separated. Golden Flower narrowly escapes death and is eventually rescued and brought back to her brother's home. With Liu Yong's fate unknown, Wu Shi seizes the opportunity to force Golden Flower into a new marriage in exchange for a lucrative dowry. When Golden Flower refuses, Wu Shi cruelly banishes her to the remote Nanshan Mountains, condemning her to herd sheep in the wilderness in hopes of breaking her spirit through hunger, cold, and humiliation. Golden Flower endures the suffering with unwavering loyalty, holding fast to her belief that her husband still lives.

Meanwhile, Liu Yong reaches the capital safely. His brilliance earns him the top honors in the imperial examinations, and he is appointed Inspector General. During an inspection tour of the Nanshan region, and with the discreet help of the local postmaster, he discovers a ragged shepherdess who is none other than Golden Flower. Their emotional reunion exposes the truth of her suffering. The couple returns home, where justice is finally served. Golden Flower's kind‑hearted brother is praised, while Wu Shi—whose greed and cruelty caused so much misery—receives the punishment she deserves. The story concludes with virtue restored, wrongdoing exposed, and the couple joyfully reunited.

== Acts ==
According to Collection of Teochew Opera Repertoire: Lady Golden Flower (潮劇劇目匯考·金花女), the version of The Complete Collection of Lady Golden Flower in Teochew Tune preserved in the Tokyo Library in Japan originally comprised seventeen acts. However, modern performances are often recombined and divided into eight acts:

1. Pledging Love with the Hairpin (荊釵定情): Golden Flower does not look down on the poor or covet the rich; she and the impoverished scholar Liu Yong pledge themselves in marriage.
2. Humiliated While Selling His Writings (賣文受辱): Liu Yong wishes to travel to the capital for the imperial examinations but has no money. While trying to sell his writings for help, he is humiliated by Golden Flower's sister‑in‑law, Madam Wu.
3. Seeking Help from Her Brother (求兄相助): Golden Flower's brother, Jin Zhang, provides financial support to Liu Yong, and the two men travel to the capital together.
4. Robbed on the Road (途中遇盜): On their journey to the capital, the couple encounters bandits and is forcibly separated.
5. Herding Sheep on South Mountain (南山牧羊): After Golden Flower is rescued and brought back to her brother's home, she refuses to remarry and is punished by her sister‑in‑law, who sends her to herd sheep on South Mountain.
6. Liu Yong Wins First Place in the Examination (劉永中舉): Liu Yong becomes the top scorer in the provincial examination and is appointed as a supervisory official.
7. Reunion at the Post Station (驛館會妻), also called Reunion on South Mountain (南山會妻): While on official tour to South Mountain, Liu Yong is reunited with Golden Flower through the arrangement of the post station master.
8. Punishing Evil and a Joyous Reunion (懲惡團圓): Madam Wu receives her due punishment, and the couple is finally reunited in happiness.

=== Famous Aria ===
The aria "The Bright Moon Shines Fullest on the Sorrowful" (明月偏向愁人圓) comes from the fifth act, Herding Sheep on South Mountain. It is one of the most widely performed and enduring classic arias of the entire opera. The scene takes place after Golden Flower refuses to remarry. Her cruel sister‑in‑law, Madam Wu, drives her to South Mountain, where she must herd sheep and suffer in the bitter cold and snow. Alone on the mountain, Golden Flower looks up at the bright full moon. Thinking of her own troubled fate and her husband Liu Yong—who has been lost to her—she uses the contrast between the full moon and her broken life to express her inner sorrow and steadfast devotion. Artistically, this aria is known for its beautiful and moving melody. It is a classic piece that every Teochew opera dan (female role) must study. Renowned performers such as Xu Jiana (許佳娜), Deng Peiting (鄧培婷) and Chen Lijun (陳立君) have delivered particularly celebrated interpretations.

== Artistic Features ==
As one of the "Three Masterpieces" of Teochew opera, The Tale of Lady Golden Flower possesses exceptionally high artistic and aesthetic value, embodying the unique charm of Chaoshan regional theatre. Musically, its core melodic mode is the gentle and plaintive Huo Sanwu Diao (活三五調, also known as Huo Wu Diao), regarded as the most locally distinctive and emotionally expressive mode in Teochew music. Through subtle vibrato and sliding tones, this mode conveys with great delicacy the sorrow, desolation, and resilience Golden Flower experiences while herding sheep in the Nanshan Mountains, giving the music strong emotional impact.

Among its classic arias, the most renowned is "The Bright Moon Shines Fullest on the Sorrowful" (《明月偏向愁人圓》). Its rising and falling melodic lines vividly portray the heroine's loneliness as she gazes at the moon and longs for her absent husband. The musical structure combines suites of traditional qupai melodies with natural, conversational spoken passages. The use of qupai follows the structural conventions inherited from Southern Opera (南戲), resulting in vocal lines that are rigorous, layered, and rich in the musical heritage of ancient theatrical forms. The lyrics incorporate a large number of Chaoshan folk songs and colloquial expressions, giving the singing both elegance and a strong sense of everyday life, making it accessible and appealing to audiences across social backgrounds.

In terms of role categories, the artistic contrasts are striking. Golden Flower is performed by a dan (旦) role, whose singing is pure, refined, and emotionally sincere, emphasizing breath control and subtle expression—hallmarks of Teochew dan performance. In contrast, characters such as the sister‑in‑law Wu Shi are often performed with the humorous or sharp-edged vocal qualities associated with Teochew clown (丑) roles. This creates a powerful contrast with Golden Flower's plaintive singing, heightening dramatic tension and enhancing the aesthetic effect of juxtaposition.

The accompanying instruments further shape the characters’ emotional worlds. The erxian (二弦, called tou‑xian in Teochew) leads the ensemble with its bright yet slightly mournful timbre, blending closely with the vocal lines to create a sound that feels "as if weeping and speaking." The accompaniment fully showcases the characteristics of Teochew music, making the score both a cohesive musical whole and a vital support for the characters’ inner emotional landscapes.

Overall, the music of the Tale of Lady Golden Flower is melodious, expressive, and highly lyrical. The opera contains many classic arias, with "The Bright Moon Shines Fullest on the Sorrowful" standing as the most iconic, exemplifying the softness, lyricism, and ornate beauty of Teochew vocal style. Its performance art is delicate, vivid, and appealing to both refined and popular tastes. The opera features a complete range of role types—sheng, dan, and chou—each with distinct characteristics. The contrast between Golden Flower's gentle resilience and Wu Shi's cunning sharpness is especially striking, giving the performance strong dramatic layering.

The use of local language is another hallmark of the work. The script incorporates abundant Chaoshan dialect expressions, idioms, and folk sayings, making the dialogue humorous, lively, and deeply rooted in everyday life—qualities that have long endeared it to local audiences. The actors’ performances combine strict traditional stylization with expressive, evocative movement; for example, Golden Flower's gestures while herding sheep in Nanshan vividly depict the hardships of wind and frost.

The postmaster (驛丞) in The Tale of Lady Golden Flower is a pivotal yet comedic figure who plays a decisive role in bringing the long‑separated couple back together. Appearing at the dramatic climax, he becomes the key intermediary when Liu Yong—newly appointed as Imperial Inspector—arrives to inspect the Nanshan region; through quick wit and perceptive guidance, the postmaster leads him to the truth about Golden Flower's suffering as she herds sheep in the mountains. Unlike the tragic leads, the postmaster is traditionally performed as a clown role, with actors such as Fang Zhanrong (方展榮), Lin Zezhao (林澤釗) and Liu Jinqiang (劉錦強) renowned for their lively timing, humorous use of local dialect, and exaggerated stage techniques, including the classic "spitting‑fire sound" (痰火聲). His presence injects warmth and levity into the narrative, balancing the opera's emotional weight while ensuring the reunion unfolds with both dramatic impact and theatrical charm.

The opera also serves as a cultural and moral exemplar within Teochew society. Golden Flower's character is regarded as a model of the traditional virtues associated with Teochew women—faithfulness, kindness, and diligence. The story carries profound moral and educational significance and acts as a cultural bond connecting Teochew people around the world. For this reason, Golden Flower Shepherd is frequently performed in overseas Chinese communities, where it not only entertains but also preserves and transmits the cultural heritage of the global Teochew diaspora.

== Classic Version ==
Among the many performance versions of the Tale of Lady Golden Flower, the interpretation by Chen Lixuan (陳麗璇) and her late stage partner Ye Qingfa (葉清發) is widely regarded as one of the most classic "golden pair" renditions. The two began performing the lead roles when the Guangdong Chao Opera Youth Troupe premiered Golden Flower in 1962. Their version established the artistic foundation of the play and set the benchmark for modern Teochew opera productions. In terms of role alignment, Chen Lixuan played Golden Flower, while Ye Qingfa portrayed Liu Yong. Their performances were considered tender yet deeply emotional, capturing with great authenticity the steadfast devotion of a young couple enduring hardship together. Chen Lixuan's portrayal of Golden Flower was distinguished by her pure and crystalline vocal style. Her voice was bright and resonant, and when singing in the Huo Wu Diao mode—especially in the iconic aria "The Bright Moon Shines Fullest on the Sorrowful"—she favored a simple, sincere, and unaffected approach. Characterization was also her strength: her Golden Flower was not merely pitiable, but gentle with an underlying resilience. Her nuanced performance conveyed both the dignity of a refined young lady and the quiet endurance of a shepherd girl suffering under her sister‑in‑law's oppression.

Ye Qingfa's portrayal of Liu Yong was marked by scholarly elegance. A renowned sheng (male-role) performer in Teochew opera, Ye presented Liu Yong as refined and dignified. His emotional progression—from a destitute scholar to the triumphant top-ranked examination graduate—was handled with natural subtlety. In the later scenes, especially during the reunion with Golden Flower, his rich and expressive singing formed a striking complement to Chen Lixuan's clear and luminous vocal quality. Their artistic collaboration was defined by emotional harmony. Whether in scenes of reluctant parting or the bittersweet reunion in Nanshan, their expressions and vocal interplay demonstrated exceptional rapport. Compared with later performers—such as the version by Chen Xuexi and Zheng Xiaoxia—Chen Lixuan and Ye Qingfa's rendition is considered by older generations of opera enthusiasts to have the most authentic "old-style flavor," preserving many refined traditional movements and the genuine tonal qualities of the Teochew dialect.

== Classic Lyrics Selection ==
=== Remembering You ===
The Remembering You (《憶君》) section—Golden Flower's inner monologue while herding sheep—captures her longing for her absent husband as she endures the bitter cold of winter. She sings:

"My thoughts of you flow like the western river,

Day and night they rush on without end.

The icy wind cuts to the bone,

And in this desolate field, my tears soak my clothes."

(憶君心似西江水，

日夜東流無歇時。

寒風凜冽透骨冷，

牧羊荒郊淚滿衣。)

This aria is set in the distinctive Erban (二板) or Light Sanliu Tune (輕三六調) of Teochew opera, a melodic style known for its gentle, plaintive quality. The tune's soft contours and restrained ornamentation allow Golden Flower's sorrow, endurance, and quiet devotion to emerge with poignant clarity.

=== Recognition ===
The Recognition (《認夫》) section (the moment of emotional reunion between husband and wife), Golden Flower sings:

"Is the man before my eyes truly my husband Liu?

Since our parting, all news of you has vanished into uncertainty.

This golden hairpin proves that our love has never faded;

Now that suffering has ended and sweetness returns, tears fall down my cheeks."

(眼前人兒可是劉郎？

當初一別音訊茫。

金簪為證情不滅，

苦盡甘來淚兩行。)

== Derivative Culture ==
In the Tale of Lady Golden Flower, Wu Shi (巫氏)—the wife of Golden Flower's brother, Jin Zhang (金章)—is portrayed as a vicious, opportunistic, and selfish woman. As a result, people in the Chaoshan region often use the expression "worse than Jin Zhang’s wife" (孬過金章婆) to describe or insult women considered especially malicious.
