= Yang Ziliang Demands to Marry the Maiden =

Excerpt from The Tale of Su Liu Niang

Yang Ziliang Demands to Marry the Maiden (Chinese: 楊子良討親; pinyin: Yáng Zǐ Liáng tǎo qīn; Teochew: Iên5 Tsú2 Liâng5 Thó2 Tshen1) is a classic excerpt from the traditional Teochew opera The Tale of Su Liu Niang (蘇六娘). This scene vividly portrays the ugliness and absurdity of the antagonist, and as the most comedic segment within Su Liuniang, it stands strongly on its own. Audiences can grasp the plot quickly without needing much background, and because it is extremely popular, it is often performed independently as a standalone piece.

At the heart of the story is Yang Ziliang, a spoiled and arrogant young man from Xilu Village (西臚鄉) in Teoyeo (潮陽). Relying on his family's power, he behaves with no respect for elders and is overbearing by nature. He attempts to forcibly marry Su Liuniang and leads his followers to the Su household to demand the marriage. The dramatic focus lies in depicting his self‑important yet utterly vulgar and laughable behavior.

This marriage‑demanding episode is also one of the triggers that ultimately drives the heroine Su Liuniang to throw herself into the river in despair, reflecting the oppression inherent in the ancient, parent‑dominated marriage system. Within Teochew opera, this piece is renowned for the lively interaction between choujue (comic roles), showcasing strong local Teochew flavor and everyday life, and it remains beloved by Teochew audiences both at home and abroad.

== Plot ==
The story is about Master Su from Lipu in Jieyang, who after winning a lawsuit, hosts a celebratory banquet. During the feast, he agrees to marry his daughter, Su Liuniang, to Yang Ziliang, the son of Yang the legal adviser from Raoping. However, Su Liuniang has already pledged herself in secret to her cousin and has no desire to marry Yang Ziliang, so she refuses the match. Although Master Su regrets the engagement, he never states it openly; instead, he continually delays the wedding arrangements.

At this juncture, Yang Ziliang sings this at the beginning of the act: “Ever since the engagement at Donghua Pavilion, I have sent letter after letter urging the marriage, but the Su family keeps delaying. Today I bring the wet nurse with me to Jieyang to demand the bride” (自從東華樓定親，屢次去信催娶，蘇家總是拖三延四，今日親帶乳娘到揭 陽討親). After repeated attempts to hasten the wedding fail, Yang Ziliang decides to travel to Jieyang himself, bringing the wet nurse along to “claim his bride.”

The play depicts their journey to Jieyang, filled with lively scenes of the two observing the landscape, making metaphors, bickering, and exchanging witty banter. Their humorous dialogue, rich with everyday flavor and dramatic tension, makes the episode both charming and entertaining.

== Artistic features ==
In terms of role pairing, the wet nurse (乳娘) is a typical "female clown" (女丑) role, while Yang Ziliang is a classic “long‑gown clown” (項衫丑), sometimes performed as an “official‑robe clown” (官袍丑) depending on the production.

The wet nurse's performance style departs from the traditional image of a dignified older woman. Instead, she is portrayed as bold, witty, humorous, and street‑smart. On stage, this female clown role relies on exaggerated physical movements, lively comedic dialogue, and constant verbal sparring with Yang Ziliang to drive the plot forward, vividly expressing the vibrancy of Teochew folk culture.

Yang Ziliang, in most productions, appears as a spoiled young master or a down‑and‑out scholar. Although he is the son of a legal adviser, in this play he presents himself as a “romantic young gentleman” coming to seek a bride. His performance style embodies the aesthetic of “handsome with a touch of clownishness, clownish yet still charming.” In many interpretations, he wears a long gown and carries a folding fan—affecting elegance while behaving awkwardly and pedantically. This contrast is the artistic essence of the xiangshan chou.

In terms of performance form, this excerpt emphasizes the integration of singing, acting, recitation, and movement, with the humorous exchanges between Yang Ziliang and the wet nurse serving as the highlight of the play.

== Highlights ==
This opera has become a Teochew opera classic largely because of its strong contrasts and sharp dramatic juxtapositions. Teochew Clown (潮丑) is considered the soul role-type of Teochew opera. There is a well‑known saying among Teochewpeople: “Without a clown, there is no play” (無丑不成戲). This expression not only highlights the central importance of the clown role within the dramatic structure of Teochewopera, but also reflects the deep cultural character and local flavor embedded in this tradition.

The interaction between the wet nurse and Yang Ziliang showcases strong local color and the everyday flavor of Teochew life. In traditional opera and folk storytelling, Yang Ziliang Demands to Marry the Maiden typically revolves around the stark disparity between Yang Ziliang's self‑presentation and his true nature during the marriage‑seeking episode. In the story, Yang Ziliang often portrays himself—whether in his words or mindset—as a member of a prestigious family or even as a refined scholar. In reality, he is a typical Teochew clown: ignorant, uneducated, and absurdly self‑important. His banter and clownish exchanges with his attendants create a humorous sense of “a reputation that does not match the reality,” which forms the core dramatic conflict of the entire scene.

This artistic technique uses sharp contradictions to generate comedy while also conveying moral meaning. In contrast to the powerful Yang family, the Su family appears weak and helpless, forced to respond with a mixture of indignation and resignation. This imbalance produces strong dramatic tension. Through these contrasts, the play reveals deep social satire, exposing a long‑standing reality in which officials’ sons or wealthy young men rely on power and money to oppress ordinary people—even to the extent of coercing marriages. While audiences laugh at Yang Ziliang's ridiculous behavior, they also feel profound sympathy for the oppressed women.

Beyond its social critique, the play is also a showcase of choujue artistry at its finest. This excerpt represents the essence of the Teochew Clown performance style. Through exaggerated physical movements, comical facial expressions, and singing lines filled with local dialect and slang, the actor brings Yang Ziliang's arrogance and foolishness vividly to life, making the performance highly entertaining.

== Main characters ==
Yang Ziliang Demands to Marry the Maiden is a highly representative clown‑role play (also known as a “Teochew Clown play”). The central figures in this piece are Yang Ziliang and the wet nurse.

=== Yang Ziliang ===
Yang Ziliang is a quintessential long‑gown clown (項衫丑), but unlike ordinary long‑gown clown, the success of this role lies in the fact that although he is a clown, he must also retain the handsome foundation of a “sheng” role (生角) . This makes him one of the higher‑ranked and more technically demanding clown types in Teochew opera. The artistic essence lies in “revealing ugliness within handsomeness, and beauty within ugliness” (帥中見醜，醜中顯美).

Like all long‑gown clown, the actor must master fan technique (扇子功), the soul skill of this role type. Yang Ziliang's folding fan is not for cooling himself; it is a prop used to project the illusion of a “refined scholar.” Through delicate actions—opening, closing, spinning, and tucking the fan—the actor expresses the character's vanity and self‑satisfaction. When he is proud, the fan moves lightly and briskly; when embarrassed or teased by the wet nurse, the fan becomes a tool to hide his discomfort. His footwork and body posture must balance elegance and clumsiness. Wearing a long gown, he imitates the refined steps of a scholar, yet the exaggerated stride and movement rhythm reveal his clownish nature, creating a visual comedy of “trying to act cultured but looking foolish.” The actor also uses the hem of the gown for kicking, flicking, or lifting movements, showcasing the agility unique to the xiangshan chou. Facial expression is crucial too. The actor must portray both narcissism and embarrassment. He often displays self‑admiring expressions—squinting smiles, proud strides—yet when confronted with difficulties (such as getting lost or being mocked), he instantly shifts to awkward, flustered reactions. This rapid transformation is central to the role's comedic success.

His spoken lines emphasize rhythmic “speech‑tone” delivery, with short, clipped sentence endings and a lively tempo. His dialogue is humorous, often filled with self‑praise or misinterpretations of scenery, contrasting sharply with the wet nurse's earthy, colloquial speech. His attempts at lofty classical phrasing become comically ironic when exposed by the wet nurse.

==== Cai Jinkun ====
Cai Jinkun (蔡錦坤) is widely regarded as the artistic pinnacle of the Yang Ziliang image and the "official‑robe clown" role in Teochew opera. The reason his performance became a classic lies in how he contrasts the hollow bravado of the powerful with the true nature of a bumbling fool, using highly refined and exaggerated physical expression. One of Cai Jinkun's trademarks is his distinctive clown's gait and body movement. Making clever use of his rounder physique, he developed an exaggerated walking style for the official‑robe character: a swaying, side‑stepping motion in which his upper body remains stiff while his lower body strides broadly. With each step, the long official robe swings dramatically. He attempts to project the dignity of a high-ranking official, yet his unstable center of gravity makes him resemble a waddling fat duck. This perfectly externalizes the character's personality—strong on the outside, hollow within.

==== Fang Zhanrong ====
Fang Zhanrong (方展榮) captures the character's pretentious mindset with great precision. Through constant fussing with his clothing and exaggerated body movements, he brings to life a “hollow dandy”—a man with no learning or ability who desperately tries to appear elegant and romantic. His spoken lines incorporate a large amount of Teochewdialect slang, delivered with a strong rhythmic cadence. In the “marriage‑seeking” scene in particular, his exchanges with Su Liuniang or the household servants shift rapidly between arrogant bluster and embarrassed defeat, provoking waves of laughter from the audience. Fang Zhanrong's eye work is especially outstanding. Through drifting glances, sideways looks, or sudden brightening of the eyes, he conveys with pinpoint accuracy Yang Ziliang's lustful excitement when he sees a beautiful woman, as well as his shame and anger when he is mocked. These expressive shifts give the character powerful dramatic tension.

=== The Wet Nurse ===
The wet nurse, as a typical female clown (女丑), blends the earthy vitality of Teochew folk life with the exaggerated artistry of traditional opera. In Teochew opera tradition, the wet nurse is often performed by a male actor in a cross‑gender clown role, such as the renowned clown performers Hong Miao (洪妙) and Liao Wenqing (廖文卿). This requires the actor to “precisely deconstruct” feminine mannerisms, using masculine physical strength to portray a woman's boldness and agility, achieving an intensified comedic effect.

The visual design of wet nurse relies on contrast and humor. Her makeup typically features a “small painted face” with a white streak down the nose bridge, enhancing her comic appearance. Her costume is brightly colored with a touch of deliberate gaudiness, and her hairstyle reflects strong traditional Teochewcharacteristics, forming a sharp contrast with the elegance of the sheng and dan roles.

The wet nurse's movements are exaggerated yet rooted in everyday life—such as her walking patterns or the waving of a handkerchief—expressing her worldly experience and enthusiasm. Her personality is defined as streetwise and sharp; she is not merely Yang Ziliang's attendant but an active promoter, even instigator, of his marriage attempt. Her performance embodies the loud, enthusiastic, and slightly meddlesome qualities of a folk matchmaker, reflecting the social atmosphere of the Chaoshan region.

In terms of language artistry, her speech uses humorous lines delivered in the rhythmic “speech‑tone” of the Teochewdialect, with clipped sentence endings that sound conversational yet musical. Her exchanges with Yang Ziliang—commenting on scenery, making metaphors, and constant bickering—form the comedic backbone of the play. She often teases Yang Ziliang's pedantry and clumsiness from the perspective of an elder or a “person who knows better,” making her one of the primary sources of humor in the entire performance.

==== Hong Miao ====
Hong Miao's cross‑gender portrayal of the wet nurse is regarded as one of the treasures of Teochew opera performance. His work goes far beyond simple gender imitation; through deep artistic mastery, he brings to life a sharp‑witted, humorous, and vividly realistic elderly woman. His artistry is defined above all by his singing technique and body language. Although male, Hong Miao spent years developing a unique blend of chest voice and falsetto that later became known as the “Hong style” (洪腔). His voice is rich and mellow with a touch of age‑worn texture; when performing the wet nurse, it carries both the raspiness of an elderly woman and the fluid strength of refined operatic singing. His acting is often praised as “a recreation of real life.” He excelled at capturing the subtle gestures of older women, using naturalistic physical details—such as smoothing his hair or adjusting his bun when entering or speaking. These everyday movements removed any stiffness that cross‑gender roles can sometimes produce. The core of his performance lies in capturing the spirit of the character, not merely the outward form. When confronted with Yang Ziliang's unreasonable antics, he often responded with a dismissive smirk or a sharp, cutting glance. This understated cold humor consistently delighted audiences.

Although illiterate, Hong Miao possessed extraordinary memory, allowing him to master long passages of dialogue and enrich them with authentic Chaoshan slang. His spoken delivery was sharp, rhythmically precise, and full of expressive modulation. In scenes opposite Yang Ziliang (played by Cai Jinkun), his timing and cadence vividly conveyed the wet nurse's quick wit and moral authority. Their chemistry onstage was remarkable—their interactions carried a natural, effortless humor that became one of the play's greatest attractions. The wet nurse he portrayed was not a weak or subservient woman, but a respected elder in the Su household—someone with status, judgment, and composure. This calm, commanding presence, combined with his precise mastery of laodan (elderly female) movement vocabulary, earned him the title of “Master of Teochew Opera” among Teochew communities worldwide.

==== Liao Wenqing ====
Liao Wenqing is one of the most celebrated female clown-role performers in Teochewopera, and her portrayal of the wet nurse in Yang Ziliang Seeks a Bride is considered as renowned as Hong Miao's version, though it displays an entirely different kind of feminine artistic charm. If Hong Miao's wet nurse is marked by “cool wit,” then Liao Wenqing's interpretation leans toward “fiery energy and vibrant everyday realism” (熱情潑辣、充滿生活張力). Unlike Hong Miao's cross‑gender performance, Liao Wenqing—herself a female clown performer—naturally blends the steadiness of the elderly clown (老丑) and female clown with the humor, liveliness and agility of the young‑female-role (衫裙旦), achieving the aesthetic of “finding beauty within the clown” (丑中見美).

In her performance, she emphasizes the wet nurse's motherly affection for Su Liuniang. This emotional foundation means that when she scolds Yang Ziliang, she is not merely being funny; she carries a sense of righteous protectiveness, making the character fuller and more moving. She is known for her sharp, articulate delivery. Her lines are fast, rhythmic, and highly rhymed, and her fiery, incisive spoken passages—delivered like rapid‑fire bursts—are her signature. In scenes opposite Yang Ziliang, she skillfully uses flowing Teochewslang to expose his foolishness like a string of firecrackers. She often exaggerates her vocal tone, stretching her voice to mimic Yang Ziliang's official airs, creating a “turning his own tricks against him” effect that frequently brings thunderous applause. Because of her strong foundation in clown-role technique, her physical movements are more lively than those of a typical laodan. Her scenes with Yang Ziliang include many subtle pushes, blocks, and gestures; her agile movements contrast sharply with Yang Ziliang's clumsiness, heightening the dynamic beauty of the comedy. Her performance is widely praised for its authentic Chaoshan everyday flavor. Her wet nurse resembles the sharp‑tongued, warm‑hearted, quick‑witted auntie from next door.
