= The Firewood Shed Encounter =

The Firewood Shed Encounter (柴房會) is a famous traditional Teochew opera excerpt, telling the story of Li Laosan (李老三), a humble peddler who spends the night in the woodshed of an inn and unexpectedly encounters the restless ghost of Mo Erniang (莫二娘). Mo Erniang was originally a respectable woman, but was cheated out of her money and affection by Yang Chun (陽春), a merchant from Yangzhou, and abandoned, leading her to commit suicide in grief and anger. Her vengeful spirit lingers, and in the woodshed, she meets the upright and kind-hearted Li Laosan, recounting her grievances and begging for his help in seeking revenge. Li Laosan readily agrees and takes her ghost to Yangzhou for revenge.

The most classic performance in the play is by the renowned Teochew opera clown artist Fang Zhanrong (方展榮), whose "ladder acrobatics" (梯子功) performed on a twenty feet tall bamboo ladder vividly portrays the character's terror, becoming the climax of the entire play. Folk legend believes that the story of The Firewood Shed Encounter originated in an old house in Sanrao Town (三饒鎮), Raoping County, Teochew City, known locally as "Broken Drum" (擂破鼓). It is said that the merchant Wu Er (吳二), who caused Mo Erniang's death, was a native of Sanrao. In the northeast corner of his residence, a special room was set aside to placate Mo Erniang's ghost. Because villagers would beat drums there to drive away spirits, the place came to be known as "The Broken Drum."

== Plot ==
The Firewood Shed Encounter has long been a classic in the Teochew opera repertoire, and through generations of performance it has developed multiple versions, each with variations in plot and emphasis.

Li Laosan, the play's protagonist, is a street peddler who roams from place to place to make a living. His opening lines vividly sketch his life of hardship: "To make a living, I travel far and wide; my shoulders serve as grain jars, my feet hurry endlessly. I buy rouge, dice, and face powder to earn a little profit for my daily meals" (為生計，走四方，肩膀作米瓮，兩足走忙忙。專買胭脂朥骰共水粉，賺些微利度三餐). Orphaned from childhood, he is a lifelong bachelor — "thirty with no wife, forty with no child" (三十無妻、四十無兒) — and survives through constant toil, "like a hen leading her chicks: only by working can one eat" (雞母帶雞仔，有辦才有食, this is a Teochew idiom).

One night he seeks lodging at the Yi Ji Inn (義記客店), but the inn is full. Because he is a familiar customer and pleads repeatedly, the innkeeper reluctantly offers him a room in the woodshed, a place rumored to be haunted, and even waives the fee. Though timid, Li Laosan agrees for the sake of rest and to save money.

At midnight, the wronged ghost of Mo Erniang appears. Their exchange, known as The Woodshed Duet (柴房對唱), is the dramatic heart of the play. At first, Li Laosan does not realize she is a ghost and assumes the innkeeper has sent someone to demand rent. When he finally understands her true nature, he is terrified out of his wits.

In Fang Zhanrong's celebrated version, Li Laosan's fear is rendered with extraordinary nuance. He scrambles up a bamboo ladder nearly two zhang high, performing the famed "ladder technique": hanging upside down, hooking on with a single foot, spinning at the top — difficult feats executed with comic expressiveness. Fang's artistry lies in maintaining the character's panic-stricken, clownish demeanor even while performing dangerous acrobatics. Through movement, facial expression, and speech, he brings Li Laosan's terror vividly to life.

Seeing that Li Laosan is honest and kind, Mo Erniang reveals that she means him no harm. She recounts her tragedy: once a respectable young woman, she was abducted into prostitution, then entrusted her life savings to the Yangzhou merchant Yang Chun in hopes of redemption. Yang Chun took her money and abandoned her at an inn. In despair, she drowned herself, and her spirit became trapped in the woodshed.

During this duet, Fang Zhanrong uses subtle shifts in gaze and expression to portray Li Laosan's transformation from abject fear to righteous indignation as he listens to her story.

Moved by compassion, Li Laosan resolves to help her despite the danger. Mo Erniang transforms into a wisp of blue smoke and slips into his umbrella. On stage, this is traditionally shown through her light, floating steps paired with Li Laosan's umbrella movements, creating the illusion of a spirit dissolving into mist to take shelter.

Li Laosan then sets off with Mo Erniang's ghost toward Yangzhou. In the end, they reach their destination, allowing the wronged spirit to take revenge and justice to be restored.

== Endings ==
In Fang Zhanrong's celebrated version and the television broadcast version, the act stops at the moment Li Laosan agrees to take Mo Erniang's ghost to seek vengeance. The final image is Mo Erniang transforming into a wisp of pale smoke and slipping into Li Laosan's umbrella as the two exit the stage together; no scenes of revenge follow. Later creative adaptations added sequels—for example, the Puning Teochew Opera Troupe (普寧潮劇團) produced a version in which Mo Erniang is reborn and eventually marries Li Laosan — but such developments do not belong to the original folk tradition.

On New Year's Day 2021, the Guangdong Teochew Opera Theatre (廣東潮劇院) premiered a newly adapted play, The Joyous News in the Woodshed, based on the classic The Firewood Shed Encounter, on the CCTV "2021 New Year Opera Gala." This version diverges sharply from the traditional ending. To match the festive, auspicious atmosphere of the Spring Festival, the theme shifts from "seeking revenge" to "bringing good news." The plot is reshaped into one of harmony and celebration, with misunderstandings resolved and all characters ending happily. What was originally a moment of fright becomes a moment of joyful revelation, and the play concludes with Li Laosan and Mo Erniang celebrating the holiday together and spreading glad tidings, creating a warm and cheerful festival mood.

In the folk tradition of "Broken Drum" in Sanrao Town, Raoping, the story continues far beyond the stage version. Li Laosan—whose prototype is said to be a local peddler named Huang Qinrao (黃勤饒) — hides Mo Erniang's ghost inside his umbrella and brings her back to Sanrao. The merchant Wu Er — whose prototype was a scholar of the early Qing — dies suddenly that very night. Yet Mo Erniang's spirit does not depart. Believing that Wu Er built his grand residence using her money, she insists that the house rightfully belongs to her and refuses to leave. The Wu family summons a shigong (ritual master) to expel the ghost, but his powers prove insufficient. Even after beating the ritual drum until it split open, Mo Erniang remains unmoved. In the end, the Wu family has no choice but to vacate a room in the northeast corner of the residence, furnish it with a bed, curtains, and dressing table, and dedicate it entirely to Mo Erniang's spirit. From that time on, locals called the residence "Broken Drum" — meaning "the ghost that cannot be driven away even after the drum is beaten to pieces."

== Extended Creative Works ==
=== The Side Story of The Firewood Shed Encounter ===
The Side Story of The Firewood Shed Encounter (柴房會外傳) is an extended creative project that uses modern animation technology to achieve a form of "living heritage" for the Teochew opera classic. Artistically, it represents a fusion of traditional regional opera with digital media. Although the animated version is only a short film of about four minutes, it won the Gold Award at the 5th National College Student Original Animation Competition. It preserves the original vocal style and musical flavor of Teochew opera, while its refined visuals and humorous character movements—such as digitally reinterpreted clown-role gestures — give the old play a fresh sense of fun. In some digital‑heritage initiatives, micro‑films inspired by The Side Story of The Firewood Shed Encounter have also been produced by institutions such as the Guangdong Chao Opera Theatre, aiming to promote Chaoshan culture through short‑video platforms.

=== The Joyous News in the Woodshed ===
The Joyous News in the Woodshed (柴房喜報) is a newly adapted version created by the Guangdong Chao Opera Theatre for the 2021 CCTV New Year Opera Gala. Based on the classic excerpt play The Firewood Shed Encounter, it represents a "new adaptation of an old play." To match the festive atmosphere of the Spring Festival and the celebratory tone expected of a holiday program, the adaptation differs significantly from the traditional version.

Whereas the original The Firewood Shed Encounter is a revenge drama built on themes of tragedy and justice — Mo Erniang, once a respectable woman, is deceived, exploited, and ultimately hangs herself in the woodshed, becoming a wronged spirit — The Joyous News in the Woodshed transforms the narrative into one of celebration and auspicious tidings. To suit the Lunar New Year Gala's mood, the heavy theme of vengeance is replaced with a joyful motif of "bringing good news." Because the thematic core shifts, the plot and ending are also reworked. In the traditional version, Li Laosan, a humble peddler, encounters Mo Erniang's ghost in the woodshed and, after overcoming his fear, resolves to take her spirit to Yangzhou to seek justice. In The Joyous News in the Woodshed, Mo Erniang is no longer a wronged ghost but is reimagined as a bringer of blessings — a "spirit of good fortune" or auspicious figure. The story revolves around the delivery of joyful news, ending not in sorrow but in celebration, emphasizing themes of renewal, reunion, and harmony.

=== The Fate in the Woodshed ===
The Fate in the Woodshed (柴房緣), a sequel to The Firewood Shed Encounter, is a traditional Teochew opera work. It continues the storyline of the classic excerpt, focusing on a supernatural romance that bridges the realms of the living and the dead. In The Firewood Shed Encounter, Mo Erniang, unable to rest due to her unresolved injustice, encounters Li Laosan in the woodshed and seeks his help. The sequel The Fate in the Woodshed tells the story of Mo Erniang's reincarnation, her reunion with Li Laosan, and the twists and turns that eventually lead them to become husband and wife. The narrative reflects long‑standing folk beliefs in "good deeds bringing good fortune" and "destiny ordained by heaven."
