= The Tale of Su Liu Niang =

Chinese folk story

The Tale of Su Liu Niang (蘇六娘傳說) is a Teochew tragic love story set in Leipu Village (雷浦村), Jieyang during the Ming dynasty. The tale is widely circulated among Teochew speakers in the form of songs, operas and stories. The tale has several versions, which mostly differ in their endings, including being sunk in the river (immersed in a pig cage, 浸豬籠), throwing herself into the river (投江) and eloped (私奔).

== Early versions ==
In 1956, the famous Peking opera artists Mei Lanfang (梅蘭芳) and Ouyang Yuqian (歐陽予倩) were given two Ming Dynasty engraved copies of Teochew operas when they visited Japan. Both copies were published during the Wanli period (萬歷年間) of the Ming Dynasty and collected by the Institute of Oriental Literature (東洋文學研究所) of the University of Tokyo. The titles of the copies are "Ten Complete Collection of Golden Flower Girls in Teochew Tune" (摘錦潮調金花女大全) and the "Ancient Edition of Su Liu Niang" (古版蘇六娘).

A Qing dynasty Jieyang scholar, Xie Bu (謝錬, 1830-1876), courtesy name Chaoyun (巢雲) wrote a poem to summarize the tale:

When cuckoo flowers bloom on intertwined branches, Their bloodstained souls cannot be awakened by their cries. Beauty's fate is thin for it is full of love, Who is as affectionate as the Su family's daughter?

In the Su family, there was a girl named Liu Niang, Her beauty and name were renowned while she waited in her boudoir. Her brows shyly drawn like far-off mountains, Blowing her breath, she surpassed the fragrance of orchids.

With her naturally slender fingers like those of a fairy, Her red jade-like figure became even more graceful. She was ashamed of Tang palace ladies dying their nails red, Unable to blend the falling flowers and flowing water.

Her family's wealth and status were once grand, In her youth, she visited her mother's home. A person in the jade tower leaned against the western window's moon, In the golden house, the spring carriage halted by the oily walls.

Throughout the day, she worried about Gafu behind her boudoir's curtains, Wang Chang lived just beyond the eastern wall. She accidentally saw Yun Ying at the Blue Post, From then on, she felt for the peach blossoms like Cui Hu.

One night, playing a different tune on the zither, Yearning to seek the phoenix, she pitied the solitary phoenix. Her silken belt was tied into a gardenia knot, Secretly she threw it across the railing to avoid being seen.

The scholar was fickle and dismissive, Her love was earnest, as if to live and die together. She taught herself to admire Xianchao, When would she accompany Xiao Shi to play the flute?

Parting for long, meeting briefly brought sorrow, Vowing by the mountains and rivers, every word was true. She only wished for his heart to be as steadfast as iron, Not worrying about the ink turning to dust.

Several times after separation, she hoped for the return of swans and fish, Watching until the full moon once again became new. With a heart like a clinging vine, she eventually attached herself to a tree, Marriage mediators were useless, falsely sending letters.

Sighing at the misunderstanding of love over three lifetimes, She resolved to repay her past mistake with death. A small boat farewell met with the official's servant, Sending her across the peach blossom river.

The river water flowed deeply and did not return, Facing each other, they choked back tears and sorrow. Alive, they were ashamed like fish with double eyes, In death, they became butterflies chasing the hero's platform.

The vows of the past left sadness and disappointment, I did not betray you, do not betray me. Hand in hand, they faced the great waves, The Milky Way was silent, stars and moon fell.

Two hundred years of romantic tales, Remaining scents and leftover fragrances could not compare to sorrow. The songs of the Pear Garden followed the Zhonglang's scores, Midnight songs were passed down to the common folk.

Dances and melodies were empty and meaningless, No one remembered Xiao Yu passing on. The red powder and fragrance buried long turned to smoke, Green pearl wells suddenly filled with valleys.

Who still discusses the beauty in the yellow earth? Wang Qiang grew up in a village. Silent pear blossoms carried spring rain, Year after year, the fragrant grass evoked melancholy.

— Xie Bu, Song of Su Liu Niang

== Modern versions ==
Su Liu Niang was made into a black and white film by Hongtu Pictures Company (鴻圖影業) in Hong Kong in 1957, and was made into color film in December 1959. At the end of the film, when Liu Niang is about to throw herself into the river, the maid Peach Blossom (桃花) and the ferryman (渡伯) rescue her and help her to leave with her cousin.

== Plot ==
The Tale of Su Liu Niang has many versions, amongst them the Long Narrative Ballad (潮州歌册) version (the old version) and the Teachew Opera Version, are two of the most well-known ones.

=== The Long Narrative Ballad ===
The Complete Ballad of the Newly Composed ‘Su Liuniang – The Story of the Gold Hairpin and Silk Handkerchief’ in the Old Style (古板新造蘇六娘金釵羅帕記全歌) is a narrative songbook (a form of Teochew ballad, 潮州歌册) that circulated in the Teochew region during the late Qing dynasty. It was published by Li Wanli of Yian Road, Teochew. This work is a long narrative poem depicting the tragic love story of Su Liuniang and Guo Jichun. Its content belongs to a traditional genre of Teochew folk songs and serves as one of the textual foundations for the Teochew opera ‘Su Liuniang’. The plot of this version is:

Su Liuniang is the cherished daughter of the wealthy family in Xilu (西臚). Living across from her is Guo Jichun (郭繼春), the gentle and talented son of the Guo household. As they grow up in neighboring homes, they begin to notice one another—Liuniang glimpsing Jichun reading and playing music upstairs, and Jichun watching her tend flowers or embroider by the window. Their quiet admiration gradually blossoms into affection. Their first true connection comes during a chance meeting in the garden, where Liuniang is picking peaches. Jichun is struck by her grace, and they exchange poems that reveal their mutual longing. From that moment, their relationship deepens through secret conversations, shared verses, and the shy but sincere promises of two young hearts discovering love. Just as their bond strengthens, Jichun is called away on official duties. The lovers part reluctantly, exchanging a gold hairpin and an embroidered handkerchief as tokens of fidelity. Liuniang urges him to stay true despite the temptations and uncertainties of the outside world. Once he leaves, she pours her emotions into letters—entrusting them to her maid, Peach Blossom—hoping they will reach him safely. Time passes with no news. Liuniang’s worry grows into anguish. She wanders the garden at night, confiding in the moon and the flowers, fearing that misfortune or distance may have severed their fragile connection. Yet she remains steadfast, insisting that even if her body fails, her devotion will not.

The version of the story unfolds less as a sequence of dramatic events and more as a lyrical portrait of longing. It celebrates the purity of first love, the pain of separation, and the symbolic power of the hairpin and handkerchief—objects that hold their promises when words cannot.

=== The Early Opera Version ===
During the Hongzhi period (弘治年間) of the Ming Dynasty, Gentry Su (蘇員外) in Leipu, Jieyang had a young and beautiful daughter named Liu Niang (六娘). She lived and studied at her uncle's house in Xilu, Chaoyang, and she and her cousin Guo Jichun were childhood sweethearts. They fell in love with each other and privately became engaged without parental consent (私訂終身). Gentry Su was a gannet-like (趨炎附勢) person, and he betrothed Liu Niang to Yang Ziliang (楊子良), the son of Adviser Yang (楊師爺) to the Raoping Prefectural Governor (饒平府衙) in Chaozhou. Liu Niang refused to marry Yang Ziliang. Adviser Yang exerted pressure through the clan leader, resulting Liu Niang to commit suicide by throwing herself into the river (投江殉情).

=== The Modern Opera Version ===
Su Liuniang, the only daughter of Gentry Su of Raopu (饒平), grows up studying at her uncle’s home in Xilu. There she spends her days reading and learning alongside her cousin Guo Jichun. Their childhood companionship deepens naturally into love, and in the quiet of the garden they pledge themselves to each other, believing their future is already joined. Back home, however, Su Yuanwai is a man who chases power and status. After winning a lawsuit in the prefectural city, he attends a celebratory banquet where he agrees—without consulting his daughter—to marry her to Yang Ziliang, the son of a powerful official. When Liuniang learns of this arrangement, she refuses outright. Her mother supports her, delaying the wedding with excuses, but the Yang family grows impatient. Yang Ziliang eventually arrives with his wet nurse to demand the bride, and Su Yuanwai, intimidated by their influence, orders Liuniang to marry within three days. Desperate, Liuniang sends her loyal maid Peach Blossom to Xilu to warn Jichun. On the river, Peach Blossom meets the righteous ferryman Duobo, and the two perform the famous operatic duet Peach Blossom Crossing. Moved by the injustice, Duobo rows with all his strength to help deliver the message. But delays and obstacles prevent the warning from reaching Jichun in time. Believing herself trapped and seeing no escape from the forced marriage, Liuniang writes a farewell letter and prepares to throw herself into the river to preserve her chastity. Just as she leaps, Duobo arrives and pulls her from the water. Jichun, having finally received the message, rushes to the riverside, and the lovers reunite in Duobo’s humble home, shaken but alive. Meanwhile, Su Yuanwai discovers Liuniang’s farewell letter and assumes she has drowned. In grief and fury, he confronts the Yang family, accusing them of causing her death. Yang Ziliang panics and flees, and the arranged marriage collapses. With the danger lifted, Liuniang and Jichun decide to leave their hometown behind. Guided by Duobo, they set off together toward an uncertain but hopeful future. The opera ends with the lovers escaping oppression rather than dying tragically, offering a bittersweet but life‑affirming conclusion.

== Famous Acts ==
The Tale of Su Liu Niang (蘇六娘) is a cornerstone of Teochew opera from the Chaoshan region, celebrated for its lyrical portrayal of forbidden love, sharp character interplay, and vivid local customs. Two acts in particular have become iconic within the repertoire and are frequently performed as standalone pieces.

=== Peach Blossom Takes the Ferry ===
Peach Blossom Takes the Ferry (桃花過渡) is the most frequently excerpted act, often staged independently from the rest of the story. It follows the quick‑witted maid Taohua (Peach Blossom) as she ferries across the river to deliver a secret message to Su Liu Niang’s lover. Her lively exchange of songs and teasing repartee with an elderly boatman showcases the genre’s musical agility and comedic charm, making it a favourite among performers and audiences alike.

=== Yang Ziliang Demands to Marry the Maiden ===
Yang Ziliang Demands to Marry the Maiden (楊子良討親) is the dramatic turning point in the story, this act introduces the antagonist Yang Ziliang, who arrives with his nanny to forcibly claim Liu Niang as his bride. The confrontation sets the central conflict in motion, heightening the emotional stakes and revealing the social pressures and power dynamics that drive the tragedy forward.

== Derivative Culture ==
Since the late Ming period, the Teochew area has had several sayings related to Su Liu Niang. Examples include: “If you want good fish, choose white‑bellied pomfret; if you want a good wife, marry Su Liu Niang” (愛食好魚白腹鯧，愛娶雅畝蘇六娘), and “No hope in Xilu.” 西臚無望) The phrase “Marry a wife like Su Liu Niang” praises her steadfast devotion and willingness to sacrifice for love. Meanwhile, “No hope in Xilu” is used to describe something that is very unlikely to succeed. (Note: Su Liu Niang’s mother was from the Guo family of Xilu.)
