= Teochew opera =

Branch of traditional Chinese opera

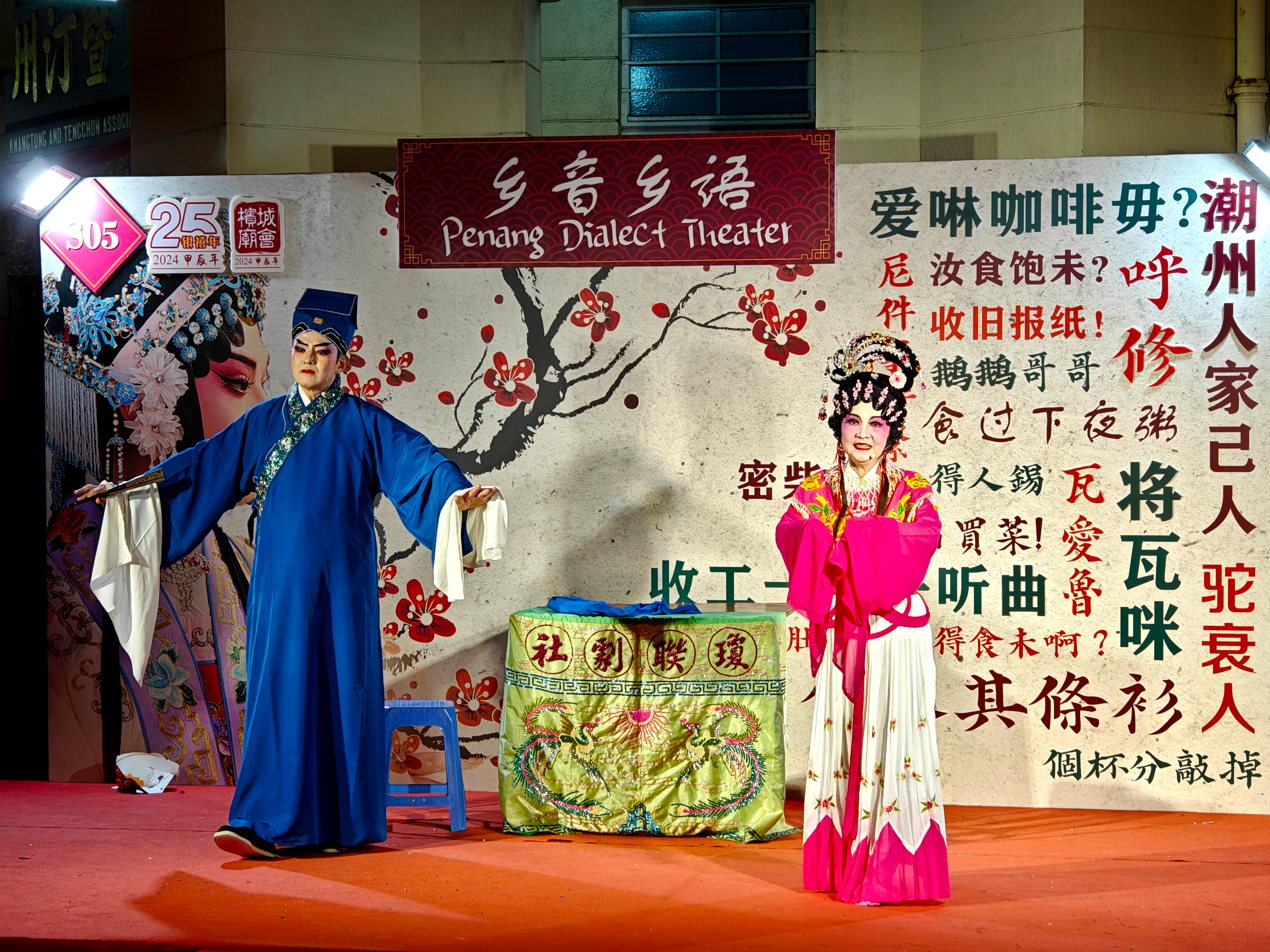
- Traditional Chinese: 1. 潮劇; 2. 潮州戲
- Simplified Chinese: 1. 潮剧; 2. 潮州戏
Transcriptions
Standard Mandarin
- Hanyu Pinyin: 1. Cháo jù 2. Cháo zhōu xì
Southern Min
- Teochew Peng'im: 1. Dio5 giah8 2. Dio5 ziu1 hi3

Teochew opera (Chinese: 潮劇; Teochow: diê^{5} giah^{8}) or Chaozhou opera, Chiuchow opera (especially in Hong Kong), is one of the many variants of Chinese opera, originating in southern China's Chaoshan region. It is popular in eastern Guangdong, southern Fujian, Hong Kong, Macau, Thailand, Vietnam, Singapore, Indonesia, Malaysia and Cambodia. Like all versions of Chinese opera, it is a traditional Chinese art form, involving music, singing, martial arts, acrobatics and acting.

Teochew opera, among all Chinese regional theatre traditions, is one of the forms that places the strongest emphasis on clown roles, even more so than Peking opera, which is already known for valuing its clown characters. It is one of the rare Chinese opera genres in which clowns frequently serve as the protagonists, as seen in roles such as the ferryman in The Tale of Su Liu Niang, excerpt Peach Blossom Takes the Ferry, Jin Zhang’s wife (金章婆) in The Tale of Lady Golden Flower (金花女) and Li Laosan in The Firewood Shed Encounter (柴房會).

== Origins ==
Teochew opera originated from the Teochew, or Chaoshan district in China and came into being about 300 years ago, at the end of the Ming Dynasty (1421-1431). It originated from the Nanxi of Song and Yuan Dynasties and was formed by the local culture of Nanxi.

In terms of long-term development, Teochew opera gradually formed its unique artistic style: the singing voice is light and low, lyrical and beautiful, and performances include lively singing and dancing and perfect division of characters.

== Evolution ==
Teochew opera is considered part of the Yiyang‑qiang (弋陽腔) tradition mainly because, in its early development during the Ming dynasty, it absorbed many features of Jiangxi’s Yiyang‑qiang. Its most distinctive trait is the extensive use of choral reinforcement (幫腔), combined with the vocal system of gaoqiang (高腔). This gives it the characteristic "one sings, all respond" (一唱眾和) effect, along with a musical style that is concise, forceful, and highly adaptable — an embodiment of the cross‑regional theatrical exchanges of the Ming and Qing periods.

Teochew opera is also thought to carry features of Qingyang‑qiang (青陽腔). Originating in Qingyang, Anhui, Qingyang‑qiang developed after Yiyang‑qiang spread there and absorbed elements of Kunqu (昆腔). Its most notable feature is gundiao (滾調), such as gunbai (滾白) and gunchang (滾唱) — the insertion of many colloquial filler syllables into the lyrics — which makes the singing livelier and easier to understand. By the mid‑Ming dynasty, Qingyang‑qiang entered Guangdong through commercial and trading networks, and Teochew opera adopted its gunbai and gunchang techniques, giving the originally solemn Southern Drama a stronger flavour of everyday folk life.

The style that influenced Teochew opera most deeply, however, was Siping‑qiang (四平腔). Once extremely popular in eastern Guangdong and southern Fujian, Siping‑qiang contributed its repertoire of fixed melodies and structural patterns to early Teochew opera. It is generally regarded as a fusion of Yiyang‑qiang, Qingyang‑qiang, and various local tunes, and is said to derive its name either from its steady, "four‑square" (四平) rhythm or from the place name "Siping Prefecture" (四平府). In fact, some of the oldest Teochew opera plays are explicitly labeled "Siping," demonstrating its profound impact.

Overall, Teochew opera artists absorbed the vocal styles that were popular in different periods, gradually "blending" them into the distinctive Teochew sound we hear today.

== Music in Teochew opera ==
Same as other forms of opera, Teochew opera is grounded on three expressive elements of music, libretto and stage. Unlike the others, musical instruments play an important role in Teochew opera. Another distinct feature of Teochew opera is the use of choral accompaniment in the opera music.

Musical instruments play a vital role in shaping the atmosphere of Teochew opera — they contribute to its emotional texture, reinforce thematic meaning, and heighten dramatic mood. The instrumental ensemble is traditionally divided into Wenchang (文場) and Wuchang (武場), each with a distinct musical function: the lyrical Wenchang section carries the melody and expresses emotion, while the martial Wuchang section drives the rhythm and energizes the dramatic atmosphere. Wenchang comprises the melodic instruments, including both strings and winds, such as the erxian (二弦), pipa (琵琶), and suona (嗩吶). Wuchang consists of the percussion section, featuring Teochew drums (潮州大鼓), Teochew shenbo (深波, sim¹ bo¹ in Teochew), Teochew gongs (曲鑼), cymbals (鈸), and related instruments. The shenbo is a distinctive and important percussion instrument in Teochew music, also known as the “high‑rim gong” (高邊鑼).

== Significance ==
Teochew opera often plays an essential role in religious and ancestral ceremonies within the Teochew community, where operas are staged as offerings to spirits and ancestors, reinforcing both religious and cultural bonds. The opera also includes symbolic elements that have deep cultural significance, reflecting the values, beliefs, and shared history of the Teochew people.

It often plays a role beyond entertainment in religious and community ceremonies, particularly during festivals like the Hungry Ghost Festival. During such events, the performances become offerings to ancestors and spirits, aligning with traditional Chinese beliefs about honoring one's heritage. These ritualistic performances incorporate symbolic gestures, costumes, and even specific character archetypes that convey respect for tradition and reinforce communal bonds.

== Teochew opera in Hong Kong ==
In the early days of Hong Kong opening up as a trading port, a large number of Chiuchow (Cantonese for Teochew) people came to Hong Kong to make a living. Following them came performers of Chiuchow operas and movies. It is believed that Chiuchow operas in Hong Kong begun during the Guangxu Emperor (光緒帝, 1875－1908) period. In the middle of the last century, Chiuchow opera movies also became popular throughout Southeast Asia, and Chiuchow theatrical troupes were established in Hong Kong to train local talents.

By the 1960s and 1970s, the Ullambana (盂蘭勝會), or Ghost Festival (鬼節) in the seventh lunar month was the heyday of Chiuchow opera performances, with tented performances set up in more than 50 neighborhoods throughout Hong Kong. The performances lasted non-stop for three days and three nights, staging more than 160 performances in one such festival.

Today, Chiuchow opera in Hong Kong has declined. Its presence has been reduced to only a few Chiuchow opera tents set up during the Bon Festival in districts with a larger Chiuchow population, such as Shau Kei Wan, Kowloon City District and Central & Western district.

== Teochew Opera in Thailand ==
With the migration of Teochew people to Thailand, Teochew opera has developed a long and distinguished history there, spanning more than a century. It has become a vital cultural pillar of the local Chinese community and, over time, has undergone a transformation from "traditional Teochew style" to a form of "Thai localization." Teochew opera serves as an important medium through which Thai Chinese preserve their regional cultural heritage and express their inner emotions.

Although traditional troupes face challenges such as an aging audience and a declining industry, many performers remain committed to artistic transmission, viewing it as a crucial mission to preserve the cultural roots of future generations. To address the reality that younger generations of Thai Teochews are no longer fluent in the Teochew dialect, and to make the art form accessible to Thai audiences, renowned artists such as Zhuang Meilong (莊美隆) spearheaded reforms in "Thai‑language Teochew opera." These innovations integrate Thai lyrics into Teochew melodic structures and blend elements of Thai music and tonal characteristics.

Teochew opera troupes from China and Thailand frequently engage in exchange activities—for example, the 2023 "Teochew Rhythms, Overseas Affections" program—which have further deepened the influence of Teochew culture in Thailand. In July 2025, as China and Thailand celebrated the 50th anniversary of diplomatic relations, Bangkok hosted the grand performance "World‑Shaking Teochew Opera," featuring the Guangdong Chaoju Theatre First Troupe presenting the classic play Farewell at Langzhou. The Mayor of Bangkok and the Chairman of the Thai Teochew Association were among the distinguished guests in attendance, and the event saw overwhelming demand, with tickets becoming extremely hard to obtain.

In Thai‑language Teochew opera, translations retain the distinctive Teochew vocal qualities while incorporating Thai vocabulary, resulting in a unique cross‑cultural artistic form. In Thailand, Teochew opera is not merely entertainment; it is closely intertwined with local religious life, such as temple festivals (廟會) and deity birthdays (神誕), and community organizations, becoming a symbol of cohesion within the Teochew diaspora.

== Teochew Opera in Malaysia ==
Teochew opera was brought to Malaysia in the early 19th century by Chinese Teochew immigrants, and it was often used as a celebration of festivals or recreation after a day of hard work. After Teochew immigrants brought the custom of Teochew Opera, it established a foothold for Teochew traditions within Malaysia.

During the early 19th century, Teochew people migrated to Malaysia primarily due to economic hardships and the search for better opportunities, and Teochew opera became not only entertainment but also a way to maintain community identity and ease the emotional burden of being far from their homeland. As they established communities, these cultural practices helped them connect with each other, find solace, and integrate into the multicultural environment of Malaysia. It was not just a performance art but also a coping mechanism for immigrants, who used it to maintain a connection with their homeland and ease homesickness.

As part of Malaysia’s multicultural image, the opera has taken on a new life in theatres and festivals aimed at tourists. Subtitles and creative innovations help bridge cultural and linguistic gaps for broader audiences.

=== Adaptation and cultural fusion ===
In Malaysia, where diverse ethnic and cultural groups coexist, Teochew opera has adapted to resonate with a broader audience. Performances have incorporated elements from various local cultures, including Malay traditions, for example: subtitles in English, Mandarin, and Malay, making it more accessible and relatable to the audiences who do not speak Teochew Min. In addition, it also incorporated to portray storylines that resonate with Malaysian values or cultural narratives, making the opera relatable to audiences from different ethnic backgrounds.
