= Cheguzhen =

Taiwanese folk art of singing and dancing

Cheguzhen (tshia-kóo-tīn) is a kind of musical acrobatics, being In popular in Minnan region(Southern Fujian) and Taiwan. In Taiwanese, “tshia” means flipping or dancing. In 2021, Cheguzhen was registered as an intangible cultural heritage in the category of traditional performing arts in Changhua County.

== Performing Form ==
Cheguzhen in Taiwan is mostly popular in the south, performed by the duo of dan (female) role and chou (clown) role. The chou role is funny and humorous, while the dan role behaves in a coquet manner. There are ancient and modern costumes, sometimes the costumes are dressed in a mixed style. Regardless of which costumes, the chou role always has a percussion instrument called “Si Kuai” (like a clapper), and the dan role holds colorful fan and silk scarf.

The music used in Cheguhen performances, in terms of the singing, traditionally includes nanguan music compositions and folk songs. The common instruments employed are kezaixian, daguangxian, yueqin, and the flute, collectively referred to as the “Si Kuan Chuan” (literal meaning: the complete four Instruments).

Performances of Cheguzhen are more prevalent in southern Taiwan, especially in Kaohsiung City, Tainan City, and Pingtung County. In 2005, there were 26 Cheguhen troupes in Tainan, distributed across 15 townships, such as Baihe, Dongshan, Xinying, Liujia, Xuejia, Madou, Jiali, Xigang, etc.

In 2021, the Changhua County Government registered Cheguzhen as an intangible cultural heritage in the category of traditional performing arts in Changhua County due to its artistic value, unique historical background, distinctive styles, and its significant reflection of the aesthetics of local communities and regions. The preserver of this tradition in Changhua County is Shih Chao-yang.
