= Lanyang Taiwanese Opera Company =

Taiwanese opera troupe, established 1992

Lanyang Taiwanese Opera Company is a public Taiwanese opera troupe that belongs to the Cultural Affairs Bureau, Yilan County. It was established by Yilan County Government in 1992, and it is the first and only public Taiwanese opera troupe in Taiwan. The Company has performed in US, Costa Rica, Canada, and Japan.

== Establishment ==
Yilan County is the origin of Taiwanese opera. In 1992, in light of the decline in local traditional arts and the withering of elderly artists, the then Magistrate Yu Shyi-kun decided to establish Lanyang Taiwanese Opera Company in hopes of promoting Taiwan's local traditional cultural assets and continuing the lifeline of traditional theater.

The founding purpose of Lanyang Taiwanese Opera Company is to preserve, inherit, innovate, and promote traditional opera. Its goal is to cultivate talents for Taiwanese opera and elevate the performance quality of Taiwanese opera. Additionally, it is involved in the preservation and promotion of other traditional performing arts including beiguan opera, Siping opera, and the Tiao Zhong Kui. In August 1992, the Cultural Center publicly recruited its first batch of trainee members. The selected candidates ranged in age from 16 to 30, with a majority being female. Renowned Taiwanese opera performers were hired as instructors, including National Heritage Award winners Liao Chiung-chih and Chen Wang-tsung, Chuang Chin-tsai, the founder of Hanyan Beiguan Troupe, and Shih Wen-hu, the only Taiwanese opera director at the time to receive the National Heritage Award, as well as Lin Sung-hui.

The recruitment guidelines for trainee members stated that those who passed the auditions would initially become students of Lanyang Taiwanese Opera Company and go through three months of training. The students who passed the first evaluation would be qualified to sign the trainee member contract. Following another nine months of training, performances, and passing a second evaluation, they would then sign the official member contract. After several months of training, on May 22, 1993, Lanyang Taiwanese Opera Company held its first public local Taiwanese opera Shan-po Ying-tai at Tsan Hua Temple in Jietoufen Community, Yuanshan Township, in the form of "lo̍k-tē-sàu" (a traditional form of performance that took place informally at the temple courts).

After its establishment, the leader of the troupe was held by the director of the Yilan County Cultural Affairs Bureau, and the vice leader would be appointed by the bureau director, i.e., the troupe leader, to the vice bureau director or bureau director's secretary. The troupe also had divisions for directing, administration, technical support, makeup, performers, and musicians. The troupe has cultivated numerous Taiwanese opera performers and musicians, many of whom have excelled in the field, including Chang Meng-yi, who won the Best Actor award at the Golden Melody Awards for Traditional Arts.

== Cultural exchange ==
Lanyang Taiwanese Opera Company has represented Taiwan on several occasions to promote Taiwanese opera through international cultural exchange programs. They have performed in countries such as the United States, Costa Rica, Singapore, Canada, and Japan. The first invitation for the troupe to perform abroad happened in 1995, when the troupe was invited by the National Arts Council of Singapore to perform Wrongly Married at the Victoria Concert Hall. Both performances were sold out and well received by the Singaporean audience. Upon their return to Taiwan, the members were received with encouragement by then-President Lee Teng-hui.
