= Tuma Tiao =

Tuma Tiao is one of the primary singing tunes in Taiwanese opera, originating from the Tsasui Tiao and developed by Shao Chiang-hai by combining elements of folk opera singing and melody modification. It was introduced to Taiwan in 1948 by the Xiamen Tuma Opera Troupe and subsequently became known as Tuma Tiao. Because of its slow tempo, this tune is commonly used in narrative, lyrical, expressive, and recreation scenes. Its pleasant and captivating melodies have made it popular among Taiwanese opera performers and widely adapted in performances.

== History ==
Tuma Tiao was created by Shao Chiang-hai based on the foundation of Taiwanese opera Chinko, Tsanien Tiao, and Tsasui Tiao, incorporating elements from Peking opera, Paitsu opera, and local folk melodies. This resulted in a new singing style and tune known as Kailiang Tiao (the improved tune). In 1948, when the Xiamen Tuma Opera Troupe performed in Taiwan, Tuma Tiao was introduced to the Taiwanese. It was well-received by audiences because of its melodious nature, and it is suitable for both storytellig and emotional expression. It was later extensively used by Taiwanese opera performers in performances. Because this style originated from the Tuma Opera Troupe, it was eventually named Tuma Tiao and became an essential tune in Taiwanese opera, alongside the Chitsu Tiao (the seven-character tune).

=== Xiamen Tuma Opera Troupe ===
The Xiamen Tuma Opera Troupe was established in 1940 and originally known as the Hsin Lai Chun (the new-coming spring). The authority renamed it Kang Chien Chu Tuan (the resisting troupe) to strengthen propaganda efforts during the resistance against Japanese aggression. In 1948, it was reorganized by Ye Fu-cheng and renamed the Xiamen Tuma Opera Troupe. The troupe went to Taiwan during the off-season for performances and remained there because of the impact of the Chinese Civil War. The troupe eventually disbanded in 1957.

== Lyric format ==
The lyrics and musical structure of Tuma Tiao are more flexible and varied compared to Chitsu Tiao. In Taiwan, the most common lyric format is the Four Lines of Seven Characters, also known as the Four-Line Couplet or Four-Line Regular, which follows a structured and rhythmic pattern while emphasizing rhyme. Filler words or particles can be added for liveliness and variation of rhythm. Another format is the Length-Variable Lines, which allows freedom in word count and sentence structure, with flexibility in rhyme and intonation, making it more colloquial and easily understood. But this format is less common in Taiwan.

=== Melodic variations ===
The tempo of Tuma Tiao is deeply influenced by emotional changes. The Chunpan (medium tempo) is the basic tempo used for lyrical, narrative, and dialogue. The Manpan (slow tempo) is employed for sorrowful emotions. The Kuaipan (fast tempo) is used to express excitement and anger, and it often includes ten to eleven characters in one line.
