= Hung Wen-tung =

Taiwanese politician (1937–2018)

- Born: 22 December 1937
- Died: 4 November 2018 (aged 80)
- Education: Kaohsiung Medical College
- Political party: Kuomintang
- Spouse: Yang Li-hua

Hung Wen-tung (Chinese: 洪文棟; pinyin: Hóng Wéndòng; Pe̍h-ōe-jī: Âng Bûn-tòng; 22 December 1937 – 4 November 2018) was a Taiwanese politician who served on the Legislative Yuan between 1984 and 1990.

He was the second son of business magnate Hung Wan-chuan. Hung Wen-tung graduated from Kaohsiung Medical College, and was trained as an orthopedist. He and his first wife and girl friends had three daughters and two sons . Hung married opera performer Yang Li-hua in 1983. After stepping down from the Legislative Yuan, Hung led the Zoological Society of Taipei as chairman. He died of a heart attack at the age of 80 on 4 November 2018.
