= Jim and Dad's Brewing Company =

Brewery in Yuanshan, Yilan County, Taiwan

Jim and Dad's Brewing Company 吉姆老爹啤酒工場
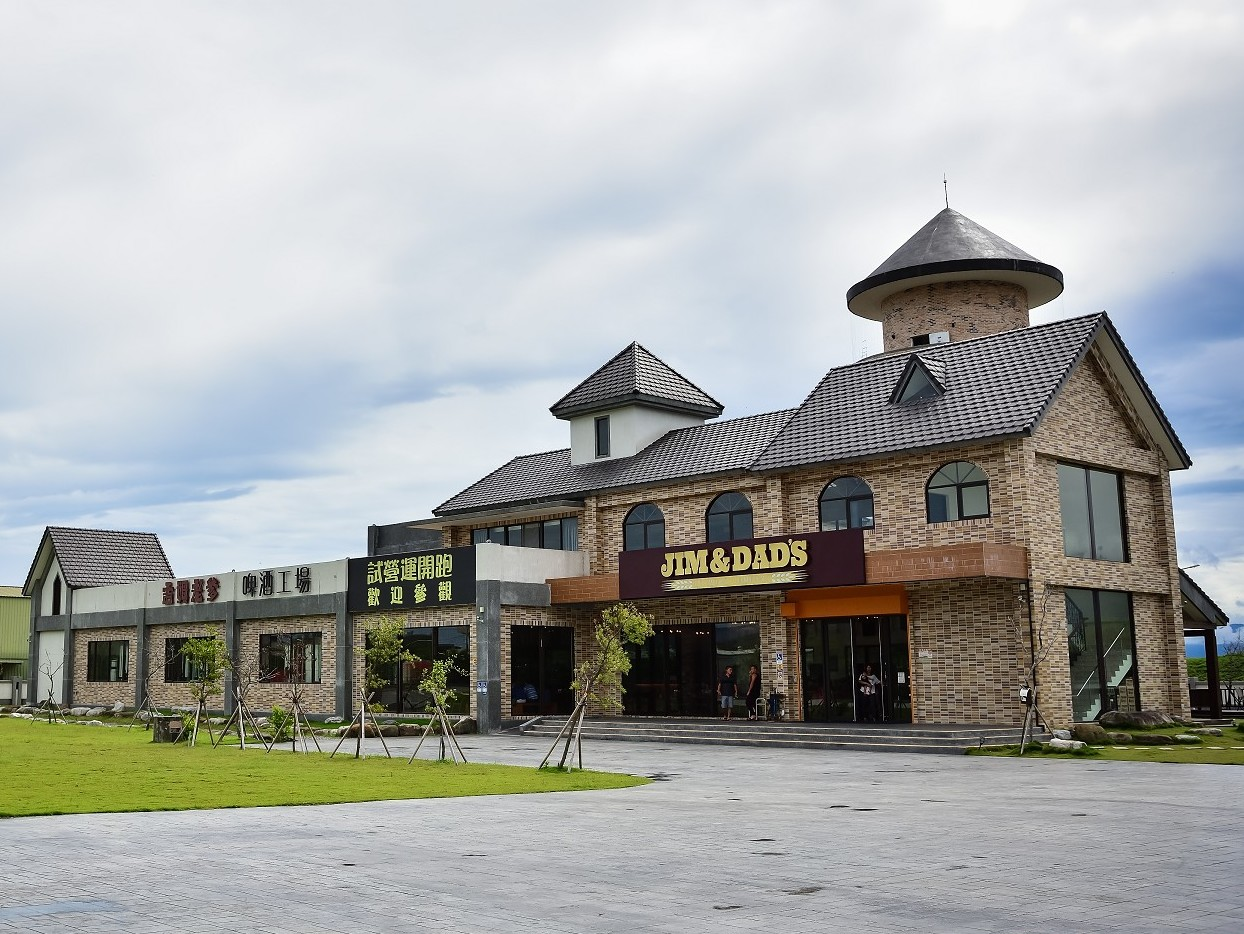
- Interactive map of Jim and Dad's Brewing Company 吉姆老爹啤酒工場
- Location: Yuanshan, Yilan County, Taiwan
- Coordinates: 24°42′28.5″N 121°41′02.4″E
- Opened: September 2015
- Key people: Jim Sung (founder)
- Website: Official website

Active beers
White, dark, pale, India pale
Name	Type

The Jim and Dad's Brewing Company (traditional Chinese: 吉姆老爹啤酒工場; simplified Chinese: 吉姆老爹啤酒工场; pinyin: Jímǔ Lǎo Diē Píjiǔ Gōngchǎng) is a brewery in Yuanshan Township, Yilan County, Taiwan.

== History ==
The brewery was founded in 2013 by Jim Sung and his father. After winning the championship in the 2013 Taiwan Brew Beer Contest, Sung started to work with his father to prepare a craft brewery which opened in 2015.

== Architecture ==
The brewery is a two-story building. The ground floor hosts the tasting area. It features a restaurant, outdoor playground and an observation tower.

== See also ==
- Beer in Taiwan
