= Liao Chiung-chih =

Taiwanese actor

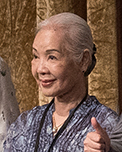

Liao Chiung-chih (Chinese: 廖瓊枝; born 13 November 1935 in Keelung) is a well-known Taiwanese gezaixi performer of stage and television. She received a Golden Bell Award in 1990 for her work in television and her lifetime achievements were recognised with a National Cultural Award in 2008 and a National Cultural Heritage Preservation Award in 2012. In 2023, Liao received the Presidential Culture Award for cultural endeavors. She has also received the National Award for Arts and the Order of Brilliant Star with Grand Cordon.
