= Yang Li-hua =

Taiwanese opera performer

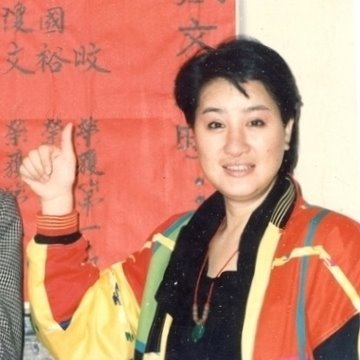
- Yang Li-hua, 1990s
- Born: Lin Li-hua 林麗花; October 26, 1944 (age 81); Yuanshan, Yilan County, Japanese Taiwan
- Occupations: actress, performer
- Spouse: Hung Wen-tung (m. 1983; died 2018)

Chinese name
- Traditional Chinese: 楊麗花
- Simplified Chinese: 杨丽花
Transcriptions
Standard Mandarin
- Hanyu Pinyin: Yáng Lìhuā
Southern Min
- Hokkien POJ: Iûⁿ Lē-hoa
- Musical career
- Also known as: A Luo 阿洛
- Genre: Taiwanese opera

Yang Li-hua (Chinese: 楊麗花; Pe̍h-ōe-jī: Iûⁿ Lē-hoa) is a Taiwanese opera performer. During her career, she performed in nearly 170 productions on TTV. Unusually for Chinese opera, she played a wide variety of male roles.

== Early life ==
Yang was born in Yuanshan, Yilan County, into a family with a theatrical background; her grandfather was the organiser of an amateur "peikuan" orchestra group, and her mother, Hsiao Chang-sou, was a male role-player with a Taiwanese opera group in Yilan County. Yang's father was Lin Huo-yan, a student of her maternal grandfather's. Because her parents had eloped, Yang Li-hua took her mother's surname. During her childhood, Yang often accompanied her mother on tour, exposing her to Taiwanese opera from an early age. Yang began to play walk-on roles when she was four years old. At the age of seven, she played the lead in a play called An-An Chases Chickens《安安趕雞》.

After starting school, Yang visited her parents on tour regularly. Eventually, after visiting her parents during a vacation, she refused to return to school, and despite opposition from her parents, she stayed to study Taiwanese opera under a strict regimen from her mother, practising proper ways of walking across the stage, conditioning by stretching muscles in her legs, basic martial arts movements, and singing.

She began performing in the 1950s, when Taiwanese opera was being performed in theaters rather than outdoors as traditional. Later, with the rising popularity of Taiwanese-language movies, many opera theaters were converted into movie theaters; the family fell on hard times and it was left to Yang as the eldest daughter to support her family.

== Early career and broadcasting ==
Yang made her starring debut at age 16 in the opera Lu Wen-long《陸文龍》. Her performances received public acclaim, and she was recruited by the Sai Chin Pao opera troupe, later being promoted alongside Hsiao Ming-ming (小明明), Hsiao Feng-hsien (小鳳仙), and other popular opera singers as the troupe's "Seven Immortals" (七仙女). The group was invited by the Chinese expatriate community in the Philippines to perform in Manila, and they went on a six-month tour of the Philippines. Yang earned enough money to buy a house for her parents, the first they had ever owned, and developed a southeast Asian fan base.

By 1962, the development of the domestic TV and movie industries had reduced the number of theatrical groups in Taiwan from around 200 down to 30. Yang's group disbanded in 1964, and she spent a year in her home village unemployed, before joining the Tien Ma Group in 1965, which became the watershed of Yang's career.

In an attempt to revive the genre, some radio shows again began highlighting Taiwanese opera, and performances by the Tien Ma Group were broadcast live throughout the island. Yang became a popular radio performer, with hits such as Xue Dingshan《薛丁山》. The lack of audience gave Yang experience of performing multiple characters at the same time, as radio stations attempted to economise. However, performing in falsetto was hard on Yang, who had previously always pushed her voice low to play male characters.

In 1966, when black-and-white television arrived in Taiwan, the only television station at the time, TTV, sought to add Taiwanese opera to its programming. Yang's troupe, Tienma, was selected for a weekly spot on the channel on the basis of its performance of Loyal Yue Fei《岳飛》with Yang in the lead role. Her performances during this period helped to popularise Taiwanese opera for new audiences, and Yang became a household name. During tours of Taiwan or abroad every few years, Yang was idolised by fans, who would often place gold pendants around her neck or thrown money onto the stage in red envelopes.

== Opera producer and manager ==
In 1969, when Yang was 25, TTV's general manager appointed her the leader of the Taiwan Television Opera Troupe, and also the show's producer. Three years later, she integrated all the Taiwanese opera troupes in Taiwan to form the TTV United Taiwanese Opera Troupe.

In 1980, Yang stated her three objectives for the future of Taiwanese opera: 1) to raise the standards of production and performance; 2) to reinforce basic research and development work in opera, specifically to record the original songs and compile new material; and 3) to support training for actors interested in performing Taiwanese opera. Yang and TTV organized a Taiwanese opera training class in 1981.

As a producer, Yang pushed for more lifelike productions, with more attention paid to props and costumes. In addition to developing script outlines, she also hired Ti Shan to write new pieces and Chen Tsung-ming to direct. She created stronger parts for actors playing male roles. She also had people search for lost Taiwanese Opera plays, write new melodies, and develop new singing styles.

Due to political restrictions at the time, Taiwanese Opera could only be on the air for 30 minutes. With commercials and credits, there were only about 23 minutes for the opera itself. Responding to the tighter time schedule, Yang cut out long, slow weeping scenes and emphasized faster-paced material. She added detailed dialogue and choreography. These performances attracted larger audiences and brought Taiwanese Opera into the age of television.

The TTV Yang Li-hua Opera show came to an end in the 1990s, amid a deterioration in Yang's working relationship with the channel.

== Notable works ==
Yang's hits over her decades-long career included: Seven Heroes and Five Gallants 七俠五義》, The Legend of the Yang Clan《楊家將》, Xue Rengui Conquers the East 薛仁貴》, Liang Shanbo and Zhu Yingtai 《梁山伯與祝英台》and A Civet for a Prince 《狸貓換太子》. The 1979 production A Hero's Shadow in the Autumn Frost《俠影秋霜》used cinematic special effects to heighten the excitement of sword fighting scenes. The following year, Xue Pinggui《薛平貴》was the first Taiwanese opera to be filmed outdoors. The 1992 production The Patrolman and the Thief《巡案與大盜》was filmed on board a pirate ship in the ocean off Cebu, Philippines.

Two years later, her God of the River Luo《洛神》was filmed on location in Beijing. She had Huang Shi (黃石), a renowned composer from the mainland, write music to be performed by a symphony orchestra. The production was the first Taiwanese opera program to be shown on Taiwanese prime time TV.

In addition to television productions, Yang also starred in many Taiwanese-language films. One of those, the 1981 film Chen San and Wu Niang《陳三五娘》, was the last such Taiwanese-language production.

Yang starred in the 1982 Huangmei opera film Imperial Matchmaker (狀元媒) directed by Pao Hsueh-li, alongside Ivy Ling Po.

== Live performances ==
In 1981, Yang's group was invited to perform in Taipei's Sun Yat-sen Memorial Hall, and she chose her favourite drama, The Fisherwoman《漁孃》as the presentation, with assistance from students of the Haikuang Opera School.

In 1982, under arrangements made by the Taiwan Provincial Government, Yang led a touring troupe around Taiwan staging traditional folk theater for fishermen and miners.

In 1984, she toured the United States, Japan and the Philippines to entertain overseas Chinese, under arrangements by the Government Information Office.

In 1991, her production of Lu Bu and Diao Chan《呂布與貂嬋》was staged at the National Theater.

In 1995, during a four-day engagement (October 25–28) at Taipei's National Theater, Yang restaged a traditional Taiwanese opera, Lu Wen-long《陸文龍》, in which Yang made her debut 30 years earlier, when she was 17 years old. The play, about a young warrior who grapples with feelings of love, hate, and clan loyalty during the Song dynasty (960–1279), included demonstrations of martial arts, but also depicted the tender, bittersweet romance between Lu and Yehlu. In the beginning of Lu Wen-lung, Yang wielded two spears in a rhythmic combat dance, considered one of the most difficult martial art scenes in Taiwanese opera. She said she had practised with the spears for three hours a day for a month in preparation. For the Taipei performances, Yang toned down the traditional emphasis on combat scenes to give the story a more intellectual appeal.

In 2000, Yang and her troupe performed the Chinese romantic tragedy Liang-Zhu 《梁祝》. Tickets for the six-day run were purchased months in advance. In one scene of Liang-Zhu《梁祝》, Yang as the male lead carries the heroine on her back for several minutes. Yang said she was physically comfortable with this, as she had performed the scene many times during her career. Yang's students Chen Ya-lan (陳亞蘭) and Ji Li-ru (紀麗如) played the other two leading characters in the play.

In 2007, having been absent from the public eye for four years, Yang was asked to return to celebrate the 20th anniversary of the opening of the National Theater by performing new versions of the operas A Civet for a Prince《狸貓換太子》and A Life for the Master《丹心救主》. She reworked the songs for the opera, wrote new choreography for the works in collaboration with performer Hsiao Feng-hsien (小鳳仙) and Peking Opera director Chu Lu-hao (朱陸豪), and also took on three different parts. As well as playing the Song dynasty emperor Renzong (宋仁宗), she also played a loyal minister and the commoner who looked after the emperor's birth mother.

== Personal life ==
Yang married Hung Wen-tung on 26 March 1983. The marriage drew thousands of uninvited fans.

== Legacy and recognition ==
Yang's performances have won acclaim both at home and abroad.

- 1967: National Theatre Contest Winner of Best Actor
- 1978: Columbia International Film Festival Award for the Most Popular Film
- 1985: Excellent TV Theatre Show --The Flirting Scholar 《風流才子唐伯虎》
- 1988: The Golden Bell Award for Traditional Theatre~The Best Soap Opera -- Wang Wenying & Bamboo Reed Horse 《王文英與竹蘆馬》
- 1991: New York American Chinese Arts Association Award for Outstanding Asian Art Performer
- 1993: The Golden Bell Award for Special Contribution-for her lifetime contribution to the development of Taiwanese opera
- 1995: Taipei City Award for Folk Art Performer
- 1996: Overseas Chinese Affairs Commission's Huaguang Medal
- 1998: Elected One of Taiwan's 50 Most Influential People in the Past 400 Years by Common Wealth Magazine
- 2022: Special Award for Opera Performance 33rd Golden Melody Awards
- 2025: National Cultural Award (shared with Wu Cheng and Fu Ming-guang)

In 1996, Yang was voted as one of the "ten hottest idols" by a gay and lesbian organization.
