= Fushan Botanical Garden =

Botanical garden in Taiwan

- 福山植物園
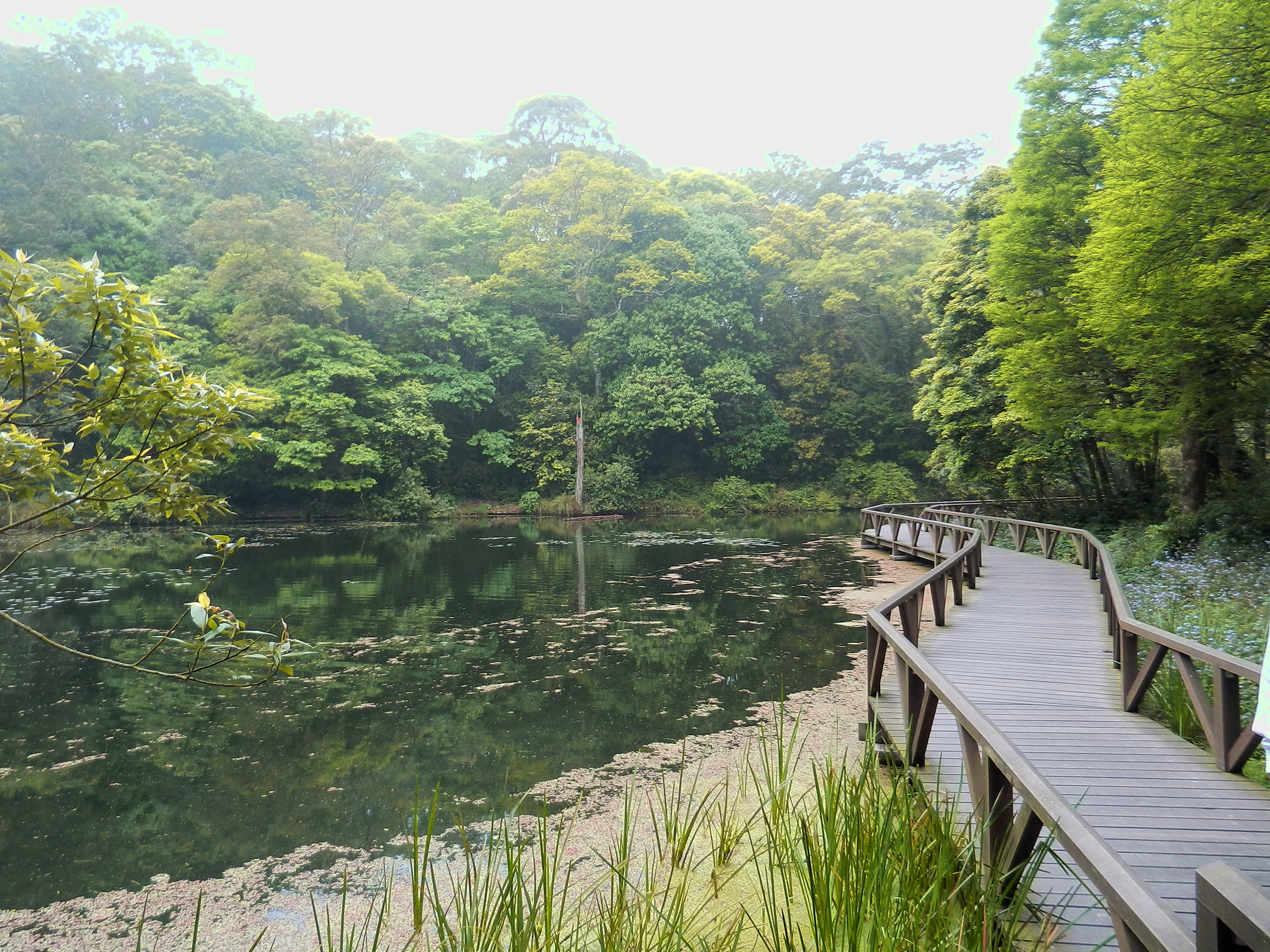
- Interactive map of Fushan Botanical Garden
- Type: botanical garden
- Location: Yuanshan, Yilan County and Wulai, New Taipei in Taiwan
- Coordinates: 24°45′34.9″N 121°35′25.1″E
- Area: 410 hectares (1,000 acres)
- Elevation: 600–1,400 m (2,000–4,600 ft)
- Administrator: Taiwan Forestry Research Institute
- Plants: 700 species
- Website: Official website

The Fushan Botanical Garden (traditional Chinese: 福山植物園; simplified Chinese: 福山植物园; pinyin: Jiāyì Zhíwùyuán) is a botanical garden in Yuanshan Township, Yilan County and Wulai District, New Taipei in Taiwan. It is managed by Taiwan Forestry Research Institute.

== History ==
The area used to be inhabited by the Atayal people.

== Geology ==
Covering an area of 410 hectares, it is the largest botanical garden in Taiwan. It stands on an elevation of 600–1,400 meters above sea level. It has an annual average temperature of 18.5 °C, and rainfall of 4,125 mm. It consists of more than 700 species of plants.

== Facilities ==
The botanical garden features a nature center which displays the information regarding the garden. It has a 20 km-long walking path for visitors to explore the garden.

== See also ==
- List of parks in Taiwan
