= Ming Hwa Yuan Arts and Culture Group =

Taiwanese opera troupe

Ming Hwa Yuan (Chinese: 明華園；Taiwanese Hokkien：bîng-huâ-hn̂g) is the largest Taiwanese opera troupe, founded in 1929 by Chen Ming-Chi (陳明吉) and theater owner Tsai Bin-Hwa (蔡炳華). The Chen family has maintained a dedicated presence in Taiwan's opera industry for over four generations. Following the passing of its founding leader, Chen Ming-chi, in 1997, the second-generation director, Chen Sheng-Fu, undertook a comprehensive restructuring of the organization.

== History ==
Chen Ming-chi, the founder of Ming Hwa Yuan, was born in Kōshun Subprefecture (恆春支廳), Akō Prefecture (阿緱廳) in Japanese Formosa (modern Checheng, Pingtung County, Taiwan). He started Ming Hwa troupe, the predecessor of Ming Hwa Yuan, with Tsai Bin-hwa (蔡炳華), as proprietor of theater.

In the early stage, the Japanese rulers allowed the local customs to develop without much interference and Taiwanese opera continue to thrive. After the Pacific War broke out, the Japanese government implemented a Kōminka policy that encouraged Japanization. During this period (1937-1945), the Japanese government prohibited the public performance of Taiwanese opera. However, Ming Hwa troupe was one of the few groups that were allowed to perform.

In 1945, Taiwan was handed over to the Kuomintang-led Republic of China. Taiwanese opera was rejuvenated and became fashionable in Taiwan. In 1949, there were over 500 registered troupes. However, the American Westerns and Japanese Samurai movies blitzed the Taiwanese film market in the 1960s, which made the Taiwanese opera's box office flop.

After experiencing the rise and fall of Taiwanese opera, Ming Hwa Yuan has not only absorbed social trends, but has innovated the art by integrating the elements of modern theater and cinema. In 1982, they won the first prize of the National Theater Competition in Taiwan by the opera “Father and Son” .

Besides their performances and theatrical creations, Ming Hwa Yuan also conducts educational outreach related to Taiwanese opera. Additionally, the troupe actively participates in international events and has received invitations to showcase their talents in countries including Japan, France, the United States, Singapore, South Africa, and mainland China.

== Organization ==
Ming Hwa Yuan is a family-owned troupe, managed by family members. Within the overarching organization of Ming Hwa Yuan, there are eight subgroups, namely "tiān(天), dì(地), xuán(玄), huáng(黃), rì(日), yuè(月), xīng(星), chén(辰)."

Additionally, collaborative teams established by family members or troupe members, including Xiu Hua Yuan, Sheng Qiu Tuan, Yang Ming Yuan, and Yi Hua Yuan, are distributed throughout various regions of Taiwan. In total, there are eight independent subgroups and four small collaborative teams.

== Further references ==
- Lu, Yu Xiu. "Taiwanese Opera." In The Music History of Taiwan, 170-172. Taipei: Wu-Nan Culture Enterprise (五南文化廣場), 2003.
- "Taiwanese Opera." Art Appreciation, Winter, 2012, December 15, 2012.
- Wang, Ying-fen (2000). "Taiwan: From Innocence to Funny Rap". In Broughton, Simon; Ellingham, Mark (eds.). World Music. Volume 2, Latin and North America, Caribbean, India, Asia and Pacific. London: Rough Guides. pp. 235–40. ISBN 9781858286365.
