= National Cultural Heritage Preservation Award =

The National Cultural Heritage Preservation Award (Chinese: 文化資產保存獎) was established in 2009 by the Ministry of Culture of the Republic of China on Taiwan. The biennial awards were established to "encourage individuals, groups, and corporations to participate in preserving cultural heritage, and to award such contributions" and are open to Taiwanese and foreign citizens as well as organisations and projects. Awardees include Liao Chiung-chih, Chen Dexing Ancestral Hall and the Railway Department of the Office of the Governor-General of Taiwan.
