= Yuanshan, Yilan =

Rural township in Yilan County, Taiwan

Coordinates: 24.744337°N 121.66838°E

Yuanshan Township 員山鄉 Inzan
- Rural township
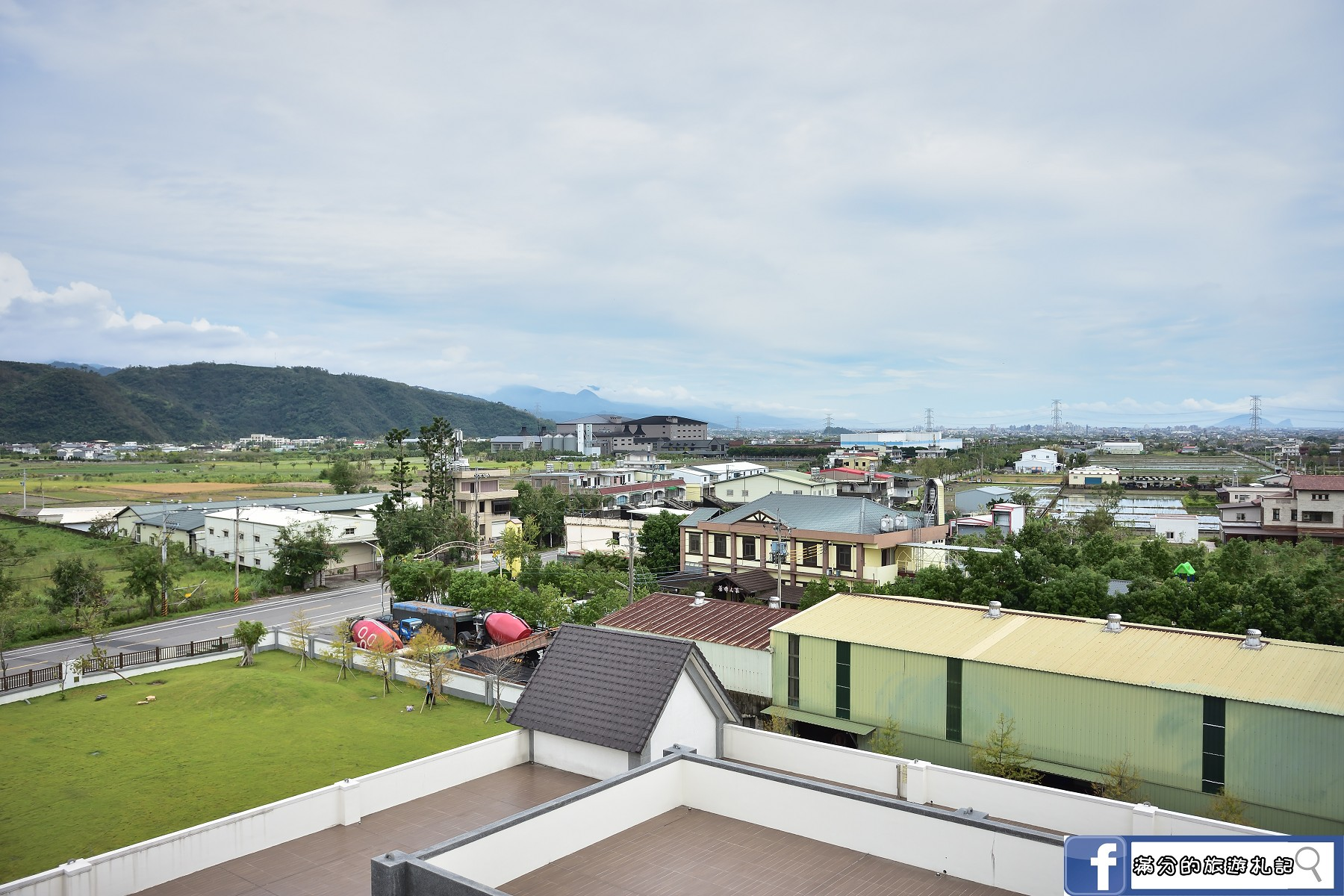

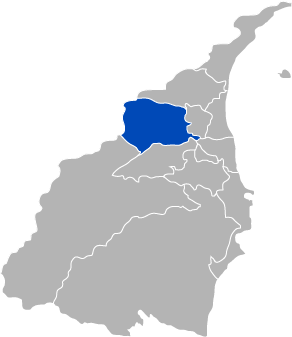
- Yuanshan Township in Yilan County
- Location: Yilan County, Taiwan

Area
  - Total: 111.91 km^{2} (43.21 sq mi)

Population (September 2023)
  - Total: 32,099
  - Density: 286.83/km^{2} (742.88/sq mi)
- Website: www.yuanshan.gov.tw (in Chinese)

Yuanshan Township (Chinese: 員山鄉; pinyin: Yuánshān Xiāng) is a rural township in the western part of Yilan County, Taiwan.

== Geography ==
- Area: 111.91 km^{2} (43.21 sq mi)
- Population: 32,099 (September 2023)

== Administrative divisions ==
The township comprises 16 villages:

- Hubei (湖北村), Huihao (惠好村), Hudong/Hutung (湖東村), Huxi (湖西村), Neicheng (內城村), Qixian (七賢村), Shangde (尚德村), Shengou (深溝村), Tongle (同樂村), Toufen (頭分村), Yixian (逸仙村), Yonghe (永和村), Yuanshan (員山村), Zhenshan (枕山村), Zhenxiang (蓁巷村) and Zhonghua (中華村).

== Tourist attractions ==
- Fushan Botanical Garden
- Jim and Dad's Brewery
- Kavalan Distillery
- Yuanshan Park

== Transportation ==
The nearest train station to the township is Yilan Station of Taiwan Railway, located in Yilan City.

- Highway
  - Provincial Highway 7:Northern Cross-Country Highway
    - Prov 7d
- Bus
  - List of bus routes in Yilan
    - Kamalan Bus Inc.
      - 751 Yilan Transfer Station - Baomin Temple
      - 752 Yilan Transfer Station - Taipei Veterans General Hospital Yuanshan Branch
      - 753 Yilan Transfer Station - Shuanglian Pond
      - 755 Yilan Transfer Station - Wanglongpo
    - Kuo-Kuang Motor Transportation
      - G12 Yilan Transfer Station - Songluo
      - G15 Yilan Transfer Station - Da Jiao Xi
      - 1785 Yilan Transfer Station - Waiyuanshan - Zuntou
      - 1786 Yilan Transfer Station - Shengou - Neicheng
      - 1789 Yilan Transfer Station - Zhensha - Dajiaoxi

== Notable natives ==
- Yang Li-hua, opera performer
- Lin Yun-ju, table tennis player
