= Taiwanese opera =

Form of traditional drama originating in Taiwan

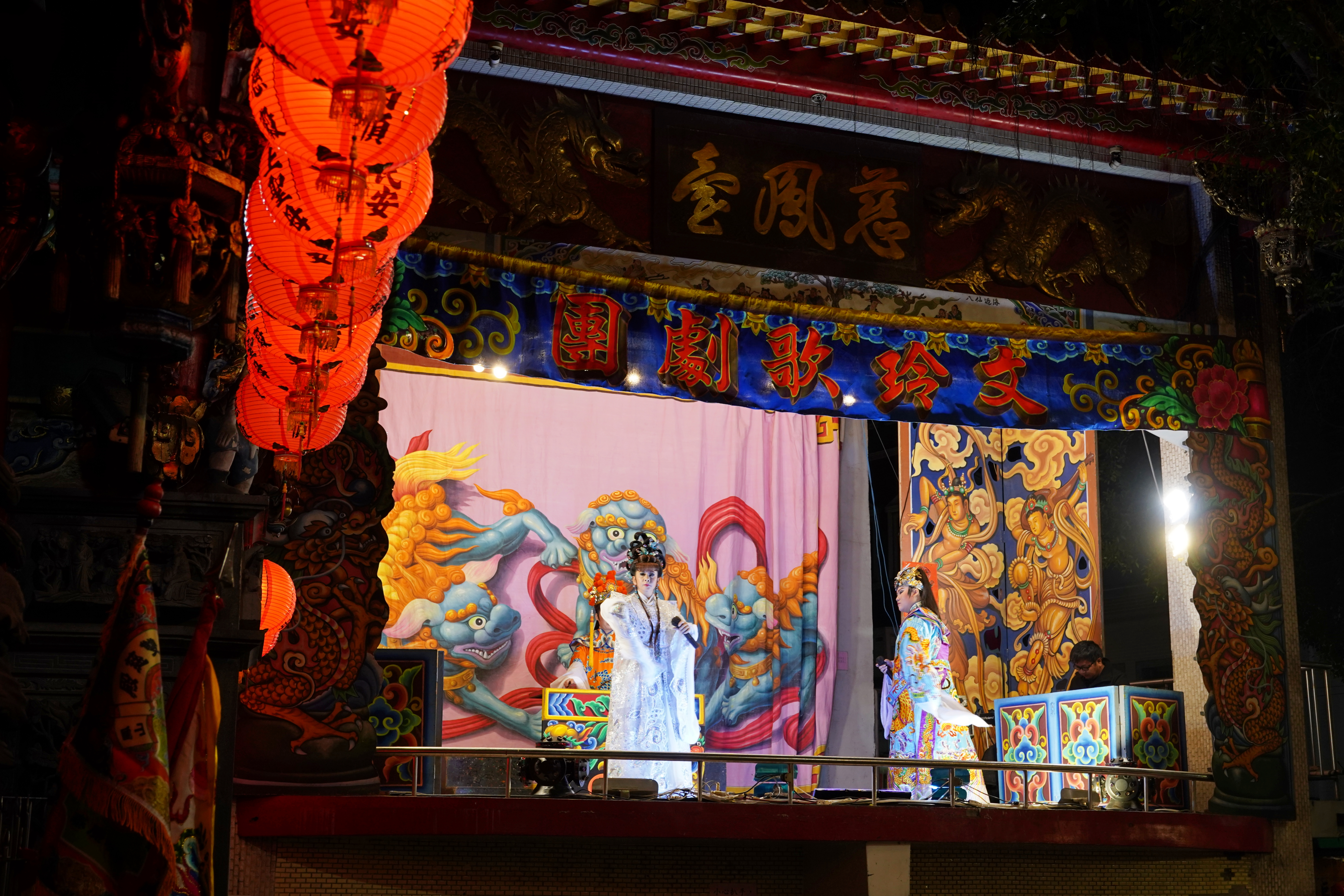
A Taiwanese opera group performing at Mazu temple

Taiwanese opera (Chinese: 歌仔戲; pinyin: gēzǎixì; Pe̍h-ōe-jī: koa-á-hì; lit. 'Song Drama'), commonly known as Ke-Tse opera or Hokkien opera, is a form of traditional drama originating in Taiwan. Taiwanese opera uses a stylised combination of both the literary and colloquial registers of Taiwanese Hokkien. Its earliest form adopted elements of folk songs from Zhangzhou, Fujian, China. The plots are traditionally drawn from folk tales of the southern Fujian region and Chinese historical legends stories, though in recent years stories are increasingly set in Taiwan itself. Taiwanese opera was later exported to other Hokkien-speaking areas, such as Singapore, Malaysia, the Philippines, and Fujian, China.

Taiwanese opera is considered as the embodiment of Taiwanese history and tradition because the political identity crisis of Taiwan shaped its development.

== History ==
=== Origin ===
Taiwanese opera is the only form of Han traditional drama known to have originated in Taiwan, specifically in Yilan. In the early stages, most Han immigrants in Yilan were from Zhangzhou, Fujian, bringing with them the Hokkien Zhangzhou dialect.

Koa-á were story-telling ballads spoken in Hokkien. Each line could have five or seven characters, and every four lines constituted a paragraph.

=== Formation ===
Jinge (錦歌; Pe̍h-ōe-jī: Kím-koa) is the forerunner of Taiwanese opera. As early as seventeenth century, immigrants from southern Fujian, China brought Jinge, the popular folk songs that set the poetry in local dialect to Taiwan. Around the nineteenth century, amateur singers in Gilan modified Jinge and gradually developed a new style called Kua-a (Chinese: 歌仔; pinyin: gēzǎi; Pe̍h-ōe-jī: Koa-á).

Other than Jinge, Taiwanese opera absorbed the styles of formal operas including Peking opera, Luantan opera (亂彈戲), Siping opera (四平戲), Liyuan opera (梨園戲), and Gaojia opera (高甲戲). Between 1923 and 1949, Peking opera troupes from Shanghai and Fujian toured Taiwan. Some actors stayed in Taiwan and became performing directors of Taiwanese operas. The influences of Peking operas can be seen in repertory, gesture, movement, percussion music and costume. Fighting themes and acrobatic movements became standards in the operas.

=== Early development ===
Taiwan was under Japanese rule from 1895 to 1945. In the early stage, the Japanese government allowed the local customs to develop without much interference and Taiwanese opera continued to thrive. In Ho-yi Lin’s book “Taiwanese Opera”, she describes how Taiwanese opera took root in China. She stated, “It’s worth noting that in 1928, the San Le Hsuan troupe (三樂軒班; Pe̍h-ōe-jī: Sam-ga̍k Hian-pan), on a pilgrimage to Wu Wang Temple in southern Fujian, performed with great success in Bai-chiao (白礁; Pe̍h-ōe-jī: Pe̍h-ta) and Xiamen… In succession, Taiwanese troupes such as Ni Sheng, Ni Kuan, Dan Feng, Mu Dan and Tun Yi also performed in Fujian province.”

==== First decline: 1936–1945 ====
After the Pacific War broke out, the Japanese government changed the previous policy and implemented a Kōminka policy that encouraged Japanisation. During this period, the Japanese government prohibited the public performance of Taiwanese opera. Even though many troupes were disbanded and Taiwanese opera witnessed its first decline, local people still tried to perform Taiwanese operas in secrecy. Taiwanese opera, also known as Bông-kok-tiāu/wangguodiao (亡國調; literally, "music from a dying nation") provided an outlet for Taiwanese people to search for their identify and fight for the "in-betweenness" of cultural influences of Taiwan, Japan and China.

Some dissidents like the "Ruiguang Theater Troupe from Ruifang in northern Taipei Prefecture premiered its own "new drama"." (Lee Daw-Ming, 158) Japanisation forbade traditional Taiwanese opera, this troupe would simply perform "new drama" which was a modern variation of Taiwanese opera, with modern costumes. The "New Drama movement" fever finally subsided in 1940." (Lee-Daw-Ming, 158)

=== Golden period: 1945–1962 ===
After Taiwan was handed to the Republic of China, Taiwanese opera was revived and more than one hundred troupes were formed within a year. In 1949, there were over five hundred registered troupes. Taiwanese operas entered into its golden age. During this time, Chen Cheng-san (陳澄三) founded “Kung Le She” (拱樂社) troupe and became the first person to use written scripts for performance. He commissioned Chen Shou-jing to write scripts of "Broken Dreams of the Red Chamber" (紅樓殘夢; Pe̍h-ōe-jī: Âng-lâu Chhân-bōng).

Even during its golden period, Taiwanese opera continued to face challenges and adapt to the changes in political and cultural environment. The rise of the new broadcasting medias including radio, film and television show, the influence and popularity of western pop songs and movies drew the general public’s attention and presented serious competition. During the martial law from 1949 to 1987, the KMT government revived the Mandarin Promotion Council and discouraged or, in some cases, forbade the use of Hokkien and other dialects. This and the shift of political environment provided little support for the Taiwanese-language based art form. The indoor performances decreased and opera troupes experimented performing on radio, film and television and large outdoor settings.

=== Transformation ===
Starting in 1954, Taiwanese operas performed on radios. In 1955, Chen Cheng-san filmed the first white and black movie of Taiwanese Opera “Xue Pin-Gui and Wang Bao-chuan” (薛平貴與王寶釧; Pe̍h-ōe-jī: Sih Pêng-kùi Ú Ông Pó-chhoàn) and the premier was a huge success. In 1962, Taiwan Television was established and started broadcasting Taiwanese operas. In 1982, Chinese Television System (CTS) Taiwanese Opera Troupe performed in Mandarin (instead of Hokkien). Televised operas are similar to soap operas and greatly increased the popularity of Taiwanese operas. However, certain traditional elements are lost because television shows feature less singing and body movements.

In the early 1980s Taiwanese opera was brought to the television audience, with Iûⁿ Lē-hoa as its popular face. The artistic elements remained largely traditional, however. Taiwanese opera, like other forms of Chinese opera and theatre around the world, often traditionally uses cross-dressed performers (反串; fǎnchùan; hóan-chhòan), specifically women portraying men's roles in the case of Taiwanese opera.

Modern and experimental forms show some propensity for syncretism. Western instruments such as the saxophone and guitar have been used in some performances. Loose Western adaptations have included Nikolai Gogol's The Government Inspector. Perhaps due to the influence of the Taiwanese localisation movement, stories set in Taiwan, as well as aboriginal characters and stories, have been developed in recent years. Taiwanese forms of the Hakka tea-picking opera show some influence. Fans of the opera attribute its continuing relevance to a willingness of performers to adapt to modern times in terms of style and artistic diversity.

==== Second decline ====
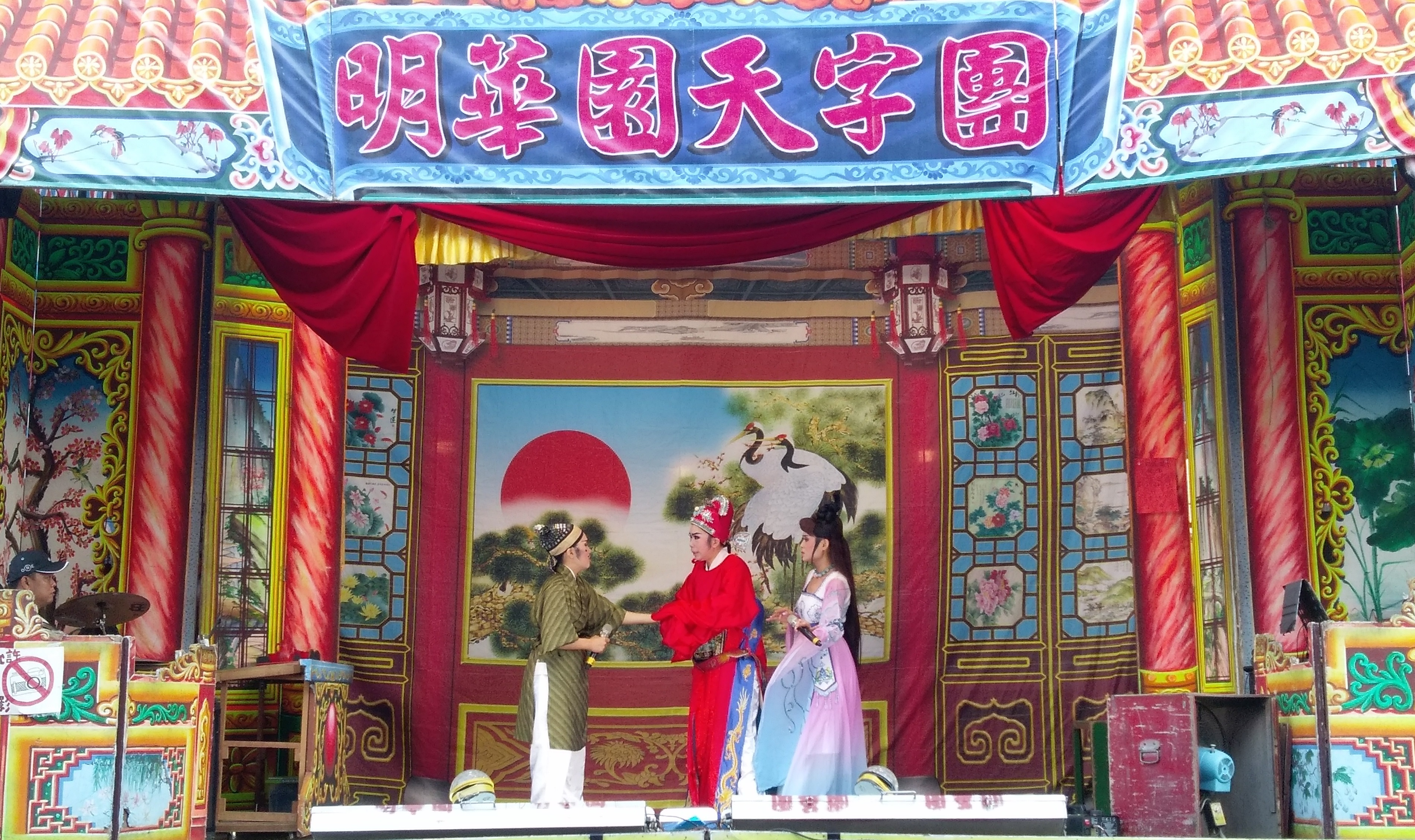
Ming Hwa Yuan Arts and Culture Group

Taiwanese opera's success in movie and television industry ironically becomes one of cause that eventually leads to the decline of indoor staged performances. Chen Shen-Fu, a general producer of the Ming Hwa Yuan Arts and Culture Group, said: "Although we know everything they do is for survival, that is not right. They are doing something that will kill the life of the opera." Other factors include political policy and social structure changes and western influences. Tsai summarised the period of decline:

The main social changes were the rise of many forms of entertainment in the 1960s and the transformation of society from agricultural to industrial and commercial in the 1970s. Government policies that were detrimental to Taiwanese opera were 1) the promotion of only national theatre – Peking Opera, 2) standardisation of plays, and 3) Limitations on religious performances and on the use of dialects.

=== Future ===
Taiwanese opera is considered as the embodiment of Taiwanese history and tradition and the political identity crisis of Taiwan shaped its development. Taiwanese opera's history reflects the growth and changes in Taiwan society starting from the earlier immigration influences, oppression under the Kōminka movement, to little state support during the martial law era and the transformations of modern medias. Taiwanese opera struggles to remain its vitality.

The refined operas in modern concert halls establish a new direction of Taiwanese opera development. One of the notable troupes is Ming Hwa Yuan Arts and Culture Group (MHY):

In 1983, MHY was the first among other folk theatres to appear on the stage of a national theatre, Sun Yat-sen Memorial Hall. A more telling example is in 1989 when MHY got permission to perform in the Zhihang airforce base. In the past, only Beijing opera had been considered proper enough to tour military bases. Three years later, MHY toured military schools. The audience's response was far more enthusiastic than it was for Beijing opera.

This transformation also reflects on the opera storylines. The traditional plots are historical and heroic events, legends and myths. Taiwanese operas gradually added more romantic elements. The intense drama and the love-hate relationships are the focuses of the televised operas. Legend of the White Snake is a typical story that combines the myth, religion, and romance.

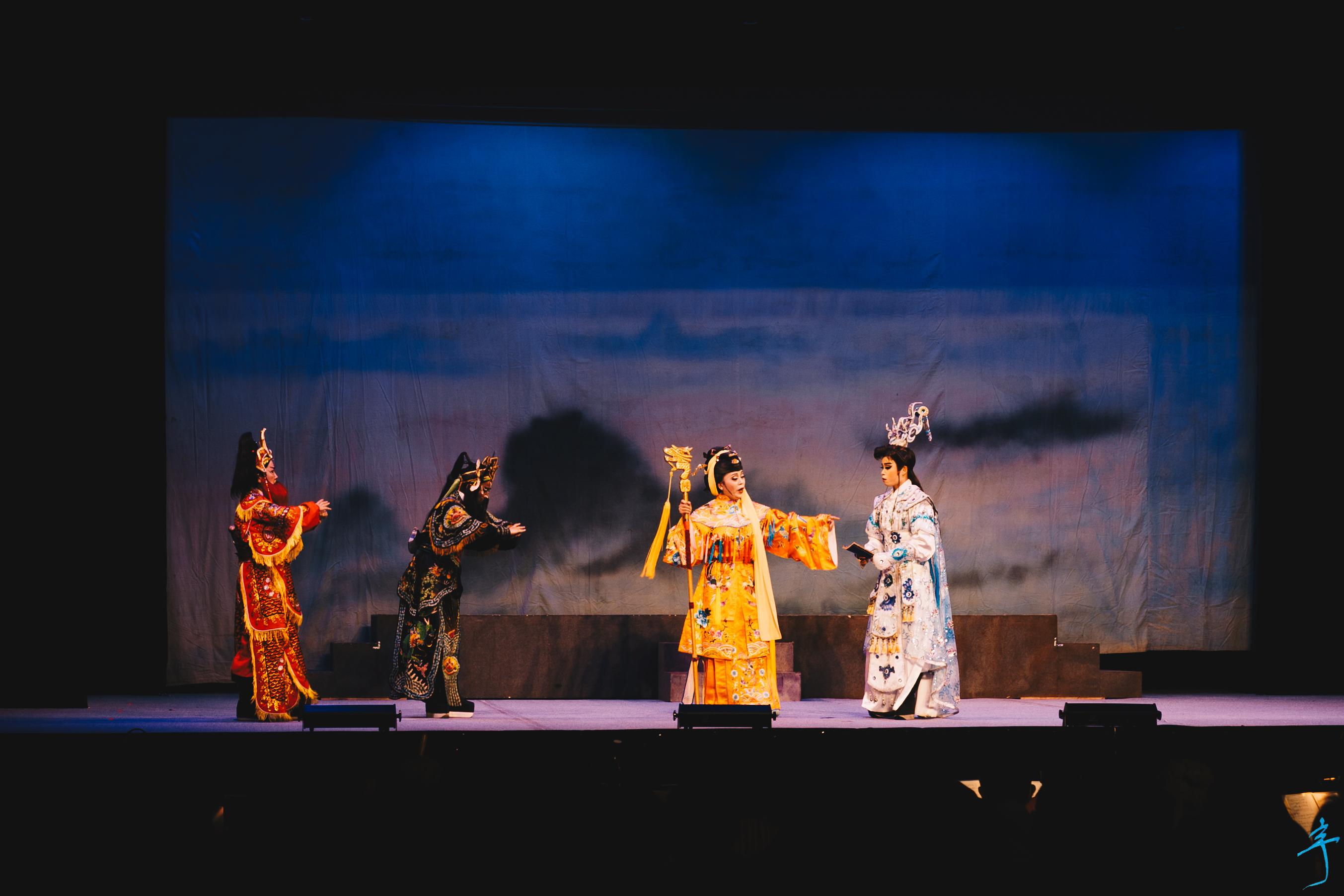
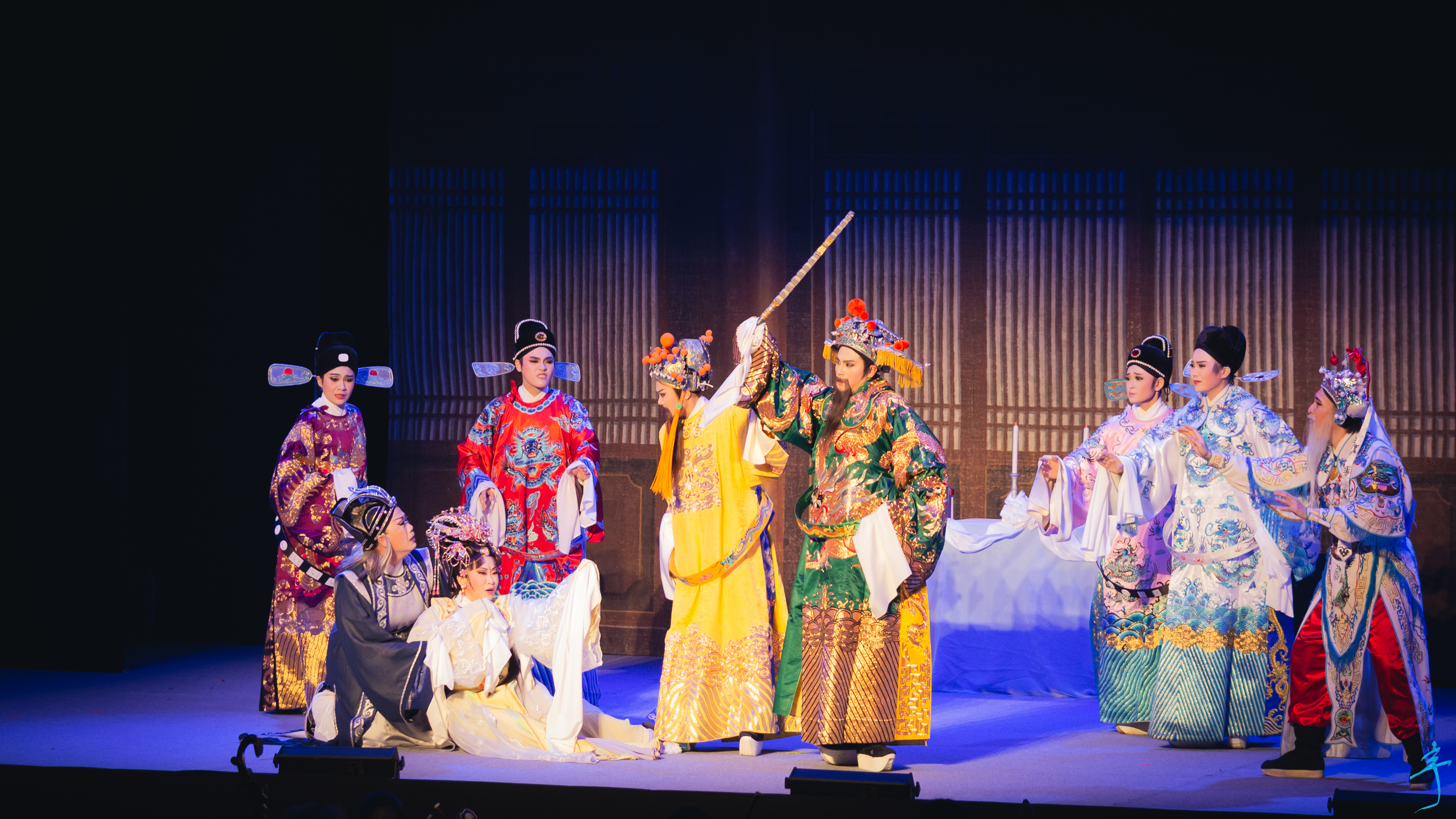
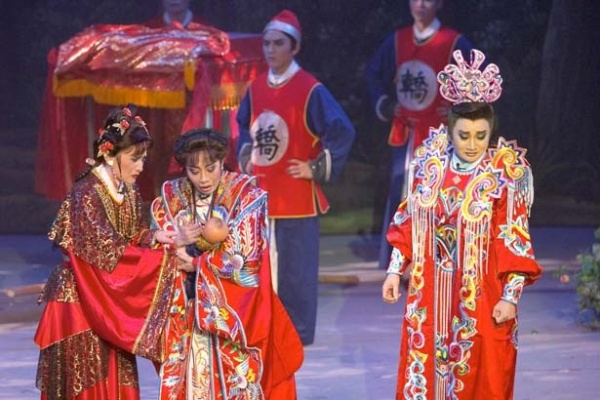
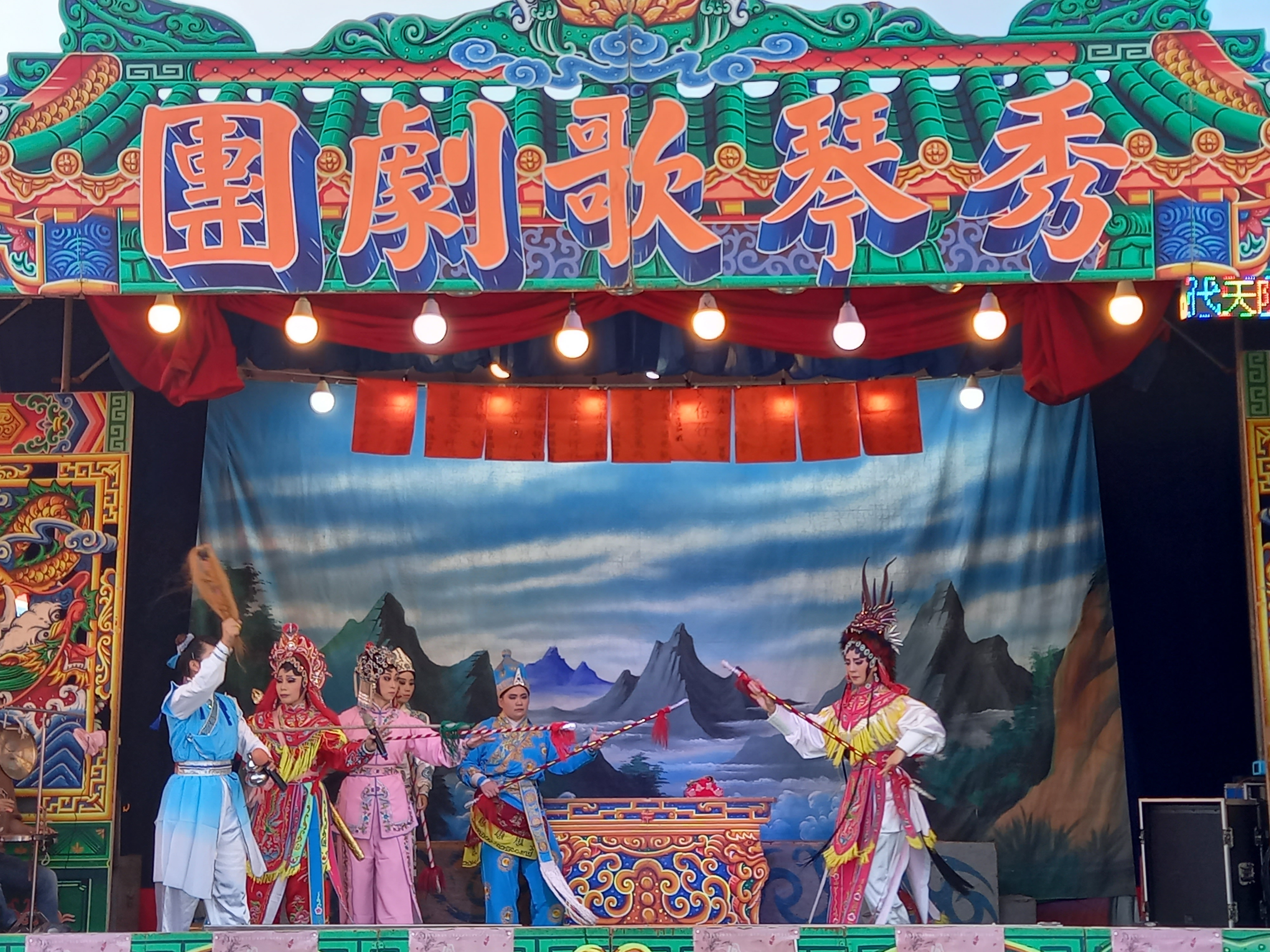
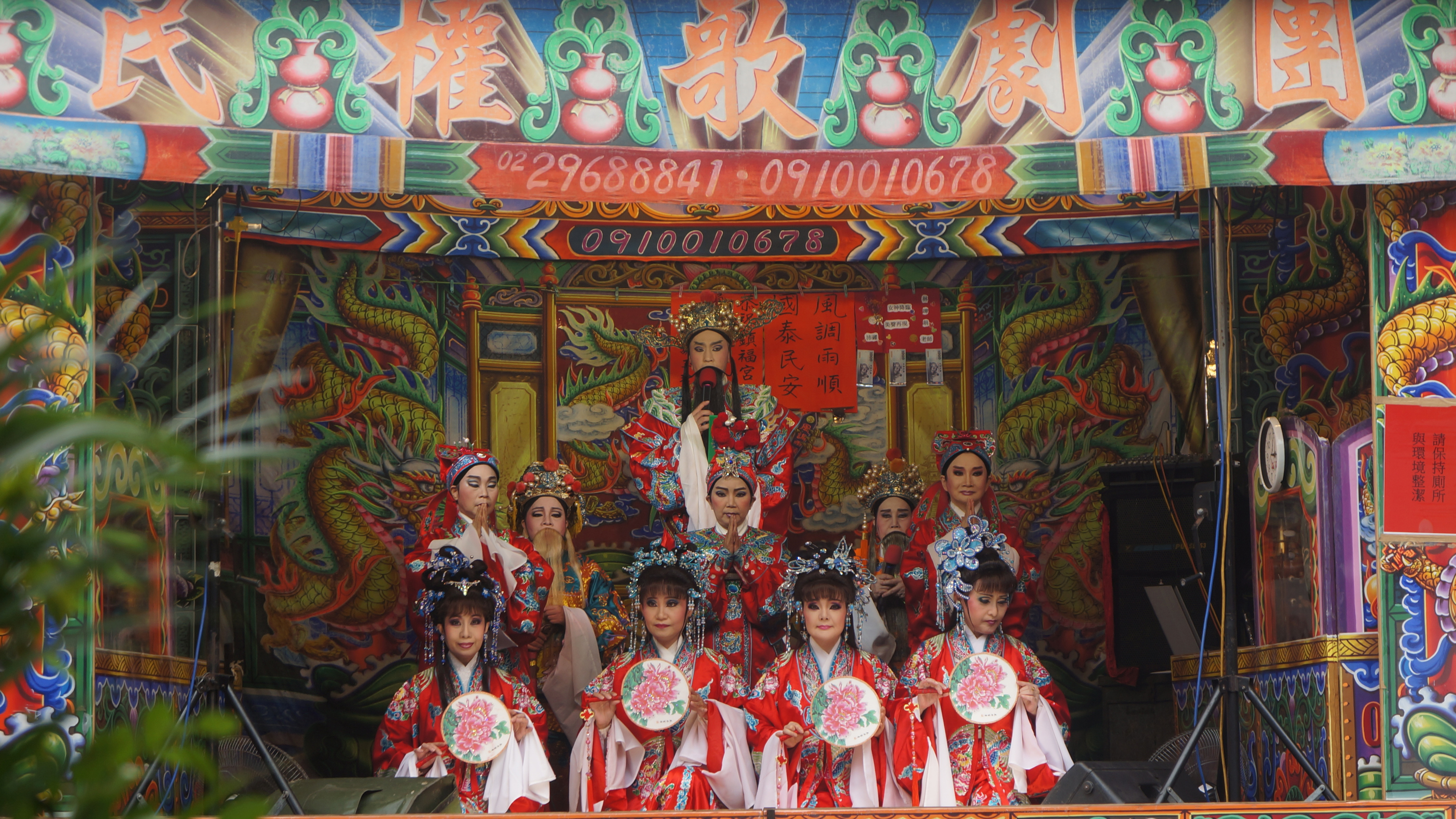
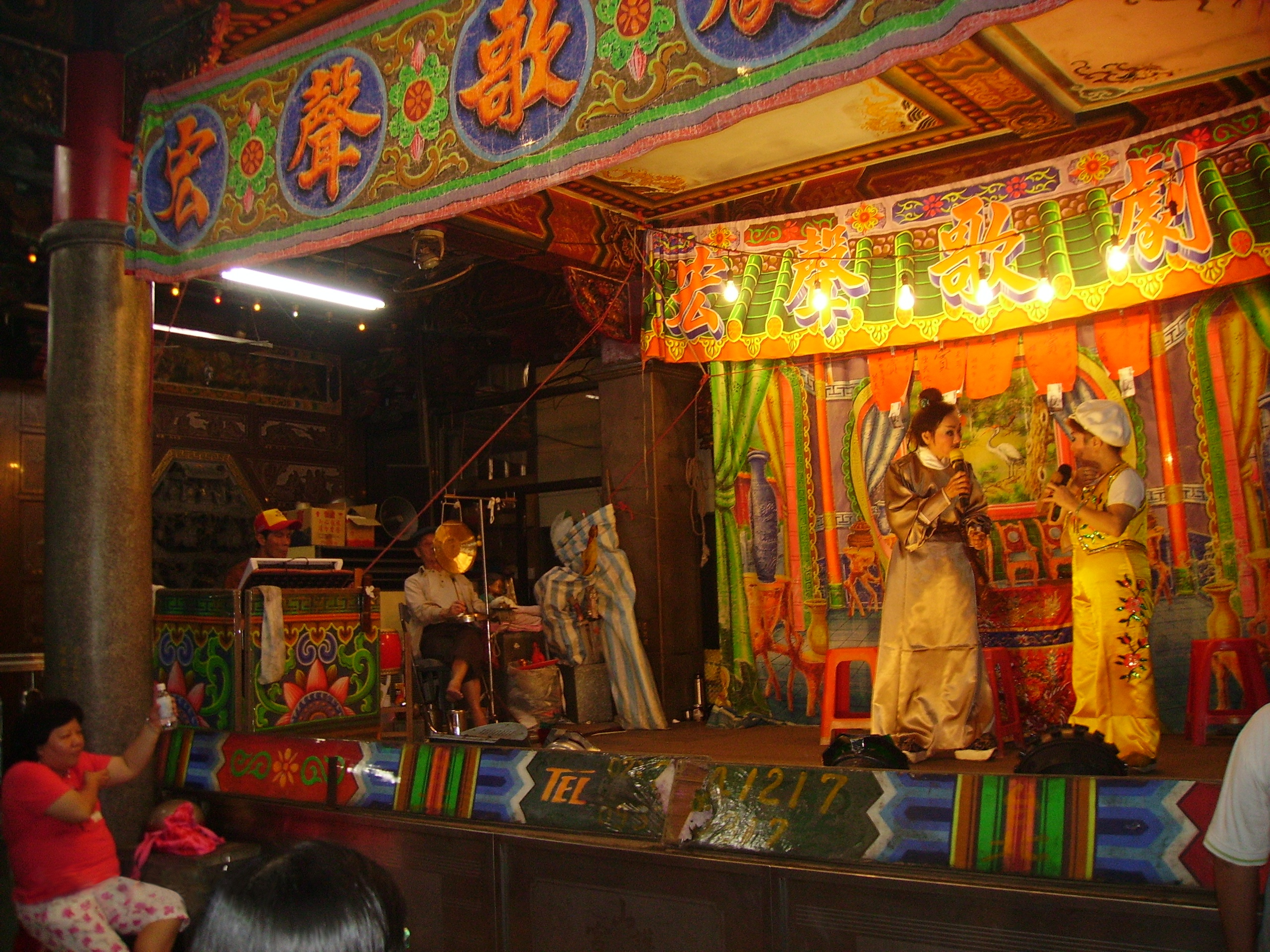

== Performance elements ==
Originally there are three roles in Taiwanese opera, Sheng, Dan, and Chou. Later, as Taiwanese opera began to incorporate more styles from other major operas, it gradually expanded to include eight major characters.

=== Male leads ===
Sheng (生; seng). These characters are gentle and brave.

- laosheng (老生; lāu-seng)
- xiaosheng (小生; sió-seng)
- fusheng (副生; hù-seng): Supporting actor
- fansheng (反生; hoán-seng)
- wusheng (武生; bú-seng): martial artist

Laosheng is an older male lead. Old shengs have a chaste and decent disposition. Young male characters are known as xiaosheng.

=== Female leads ===
In Taiwanese opera there are four subtypes in Dan (旦; tòaⁿ) roles.

- Laodan (老旦; lāu-tòaⁿ): elder female supporting character
- ku dan (苦旦; khó͘-tòaⁿ): sorrowful female character
- wu dan (武旦; bú-tòaⁿ): female warrior
- hua dan (花旦; hoe-tòaⁿ): cute or funny or a personal servant

Laodan is a dignified older role and she is a straight arrow. Also she reveals sentiment of the affection to the children so she takes sides with her children.

=== Jester ===
- Chou (丑; thiú): male jester

=== Costume ===
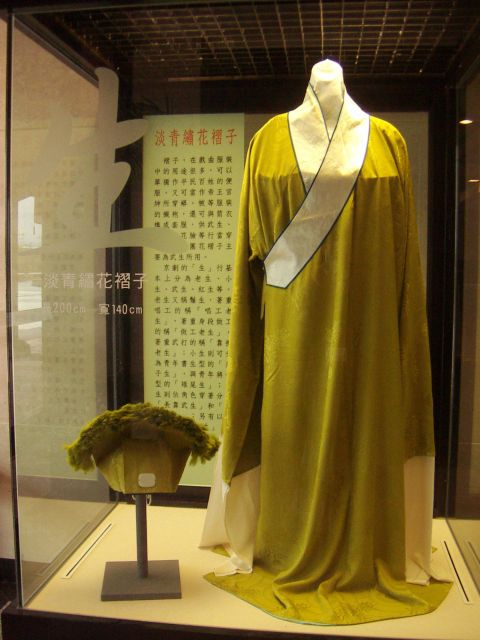
The costume of Sheng

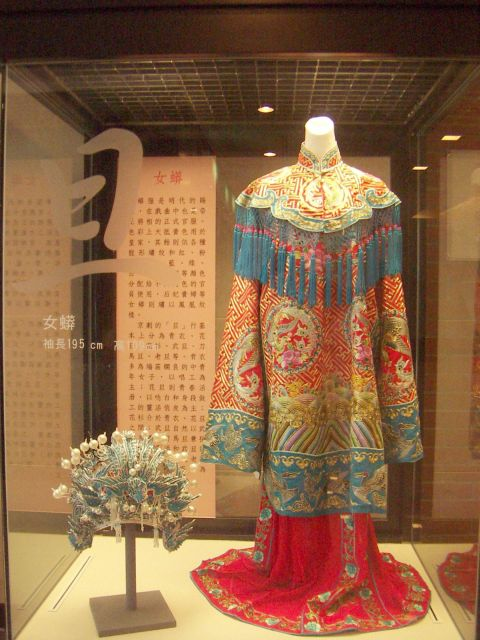
The costume of Dan

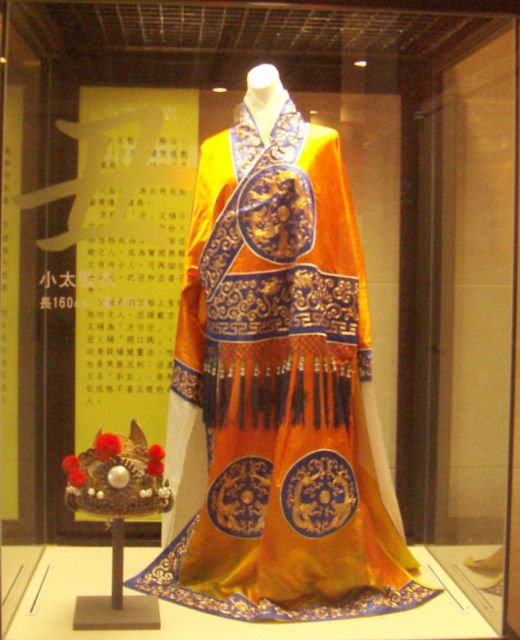
The costume of Chou

== Stage properties and figures ==
Stage properties and figures are a part of dancing. Taiwanese opera are not graphic. Sometimes a chair in Taiwanese opera stands for a fence or a bridge. Raising red flags stands for fire, raising blue flags stands for water, and raising black flags stands for wind. There are many types of figures:

- Entrances and Exits
- Pulling a Mountain
- Walking a Circle
- The Kneeling Walk
- Small, Quick Steps
- Sweeping Hair
- The Bat Jump
- The Vertigines Gesture
- The Water Sleeves

=== Voices ===
The most important in Taiwanese opera is the music for voices.

=== Instruments ===
The use of a wide range of traditional musical instruments in Taiwanese opera.

- Kezaixian
- Daguangxian
- Suona
- Jinghu

== Performance types ==
=== Three-role tea-picking opera ===
The three-role opera is known as the story of tea-farmer Zhang Sanlang performed by one clown and two female roles and the plot and the singing are fixed. The three-role tea-picking opera is simple and does not have official stage. The stage is built before the performance.

== See also ==
- Culture of Taiwan
- National Center for Traditional Arts
