= Wang Baiyuan =

Japanese era Taiwanese writer

- 王白淵
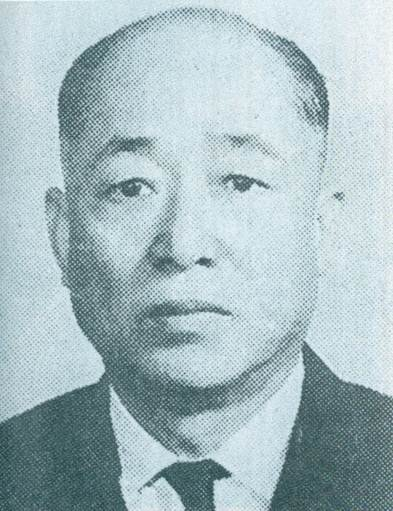
- Born: November 3, 1902; Huimin Village, Ershui Township, Changhua County, Taiwan
- Died: October 3, 1965 (aged 62)
- Education: Taipei Normal School; Tokyo School of Fine Arts
- Occupation: poet

- Wang Baiyuan
- Hàn-jī: 王白淵
- Pe̍h-ōe-jī: Ông Pe̍k-ian
- Tâi-lô: Ông Pi̍k-ian

Wang Baiyuan (Chinese: 王白淵; pinyin: Wáng Báiyuān; Wade–Giles: Wang^{2} Pai^{2}-yüan^{1}; Pe̍h-ōe-jī: Ông Pe̍k-ian; November 3, 1902 – October 3, 1965) was a Taiwanese modernist poet and a Japanese-language writer.

He was born in Huimin Village, Ershui Township, Changhua County, Taiwan. In 1918, Wang Baiyuan graduated from Ershui Public School and was admitted to the National Taipei University of Education. During his time at the National Taipei University of Education, he met Xie Chunmu, with whom he later collaborated. After graduating from a regular school, he served as a teacher at Xihu Public School in Taichung Prefecture (now Xihu Elementary School in Changhua County) in 1921 and as a trainer (formerly known as a Japanese teacher position) at Ershui Public School in Taichung Prefecture (now Ershui Elementary School in Changhua County) in 1922. Wang Baiyuan went to Japan for further studies in 1923 and attended the Tokyo University of the Arts in Japan. After graduation, he taught at the Women's Normal School in Iwate Prefecture, Japan. During his stay in Japan, Wang Baiyuan married a Japanese woman and devoted himself to literary creation, actively engaging in scholarly activities. In 1931, Wang Baiyuan published his personal poetry collection "The Way of Thorns" (蕀の道); In 1932, Wang Baiyuan and a group of literary and artistic colleagues from Tokyo and Taiwan organized the Taiwan Art Research Association and founded Formosa magazine. Due to individual members participating in anti-imperialist marches being arrested by the police, the whole group was implicated, and Wang Baiyuan suffered and lost his teaching position. In 1934, after Wang Baiyuan divorced his Japanese wife, Kubota Takashi, he left Japan and went to Shanghai to work at Hualian News Agency. Wang Baiyuan, following his tenure as an educator within the Pattern Department at the Shanghai Academy of Fine Arts, encountered tumultuous times as stability eluded him. With the eruption of the Sino-Japanese War in 1937, his life took a harrowing turn. Following the Japanese army's occupation of the French Concession, Wang Baiyuan faced arrest and subsequent sentencing to eight years of imprisonment. He endured six years of confinement before being deported to Taipei to complete his term. Upon his release, he found a new professional path, joining the ranks of Taiwan Daily News.

After the war, Wang Baiyuan actively engaged in cultural endeavors. He co-founded the Taiwan Cultural Cooperation Association (established in 1946 at Zhongshan Hall in Taipei) alongside You Mijian, Yang Yunping, Chen Shaoxin, Shen Xiangcheng, Su Xin, and others and became a member of the association. He also served as the editor and primary contributor for the organization's magazine, Taiwan Culture. Subsequently, Wang Baiyuan held positions at institutions such as Li Chunqing's Taiwan Review, where he worked as the editorial director, Taiwan New Student Daily Taiwan New Life News, and Cai Peihuo's Red Cross. By the end of 1947, Wang Baiyuan became entangled in the February 28 incident and was apprehended and incarcerated by the authorities. Fortunately, with the guarantee provided by You Mijian, he was eventually released from prison. However, after enduring a series of harsh setbacks and residing in a highly oppressive and politically charged atmosphere, Wang Baiyuan's youthful vigor gradually faded. In his later years, he began organizing literary materials and published an article titled "History of Taiwan Art Movement" in the 1954 Taipei Cultural Relics. Despite his efforts, he did not achieve significant progress after that. In 1965, Wang Baiyuan died at the age of 63 due to complications from uremia.

== Life ==
=== In Japan ===
In his childhood, Wang Baiyuan's father often told the story of Lin Shuangwen, so Lin Shuangwen's life story is deeply recorded in Wang Baiyuan's heart.

During his time at the Erbashui Public School (school in Ershui Township), Wang Baiyuan enjoyed reading and painting. He often painted ducks on the blackboard and participated in the production of wall posters.

Wang Baiyuan admitted that during his time at National Taiwan Normal University, he "disregarded worldly affairs and did not understand society. He only studied and played tennis every day."; My friend and classmate Xie Chunmu said that Wang Baiyuan was "very innocent and happy, like a bird singing and dancing brightly before spring" and "left the school loved by everyone."

As they were about to graduate, Wang Baiyuan and several classmates from Taipei Normal University took a cross-dressing photo. Wang Baiyuan disguised himself as a woman in a suit, with one classmate dressed as Charlie Chaplin and the other as a fortune teller; As for Xie Chunmu and other classmates, they were dressed in a Taiwanese uniform, holding a bicycle in both hands, making a posture of about to depart. A sign was hanging at the back of the bike with the words "Enhancing Taiwan's Culture." In front of them, a classmate pretended to be Japanese and stood there, unwilling to let him go. The same was true for the front of the bike, which hung a sign with the words "No, wait a little longer!". After graduation, Wang Baiyuan often carried this photo with him to encourage himself.

After graduating from National Taiwan Normal University 1921, Wang Baiyuan went to work as a teacher at a public school in Xihu, Changhua. His memoirs mentioned that he "only had the passion for education, worked happily every day, and played well with children." However, he had already realized the ethnic conflicts in the actual society and personally experienced the problem of exclusion and differential treatment of Taiwanese people. In addition, Wang Baiyuan also noticed the demands and activities of Chiang Wei-shui and the Taiwan Cultural Association, but he did not join the association at that time.

Wang Baiyuan was inspired by the book "The Departure of Human Culture" by Japanese scholar Naotaro Kudo and developed a strong interest in art. He later mentioned in his memoirs that this book drove him to decide his life direction. However, Wang Baiyuan seems to be somewhat concerned about this direction in life. After the war, at a banquet, he met Naotaro Kudo and said, "Mr. Kudo, I read his masterpiece 'The Departure of Human Culture' twenty years ago, so I went to Tokyo to study art. Since then, I have experienced many ups and downs in life. Should I thank you, or should I hate you?" After hearing this, Naotaro Kudo shook his head, smiled, and silently said nothing.

During his study abroad in Japan, Wang Baiyuan slept and ate with Xie Chunmu. The two often talked about the fate of Taiwanese people upstairs in their apartment until dawn. In 1931, Wang Baiyuan published the Japanese poetry collection "The Way of Thorns" (translated as "荆棘之道" in Chinese). Xie Chunmu specially wrote a preface for Wang Baiyuan, explaining his friendship with him, Wang Baiyuan's ideological transformation, and revealing his dissatisfaction with Japan's assimilation policy and educational methods. Wang Baiyuan was quite sure of Xie Chunmu's preface and translated it into Chinese many years later.

During the semester at the Tokyo School of Fine Arts, Wang Baiyuan collaborated with his classmates Hiroshi Junichi and Sato Shigeichi to release the fan magazine "Gon". Due to the mismatch between the school education and the art environment in Japan at that time, Wang Baiyuan gradually shifted his attention to poetry and prose creation.

Wang Baiyuan, who aspires to become a Taiwanese Miller, has a style that is vastly different from Miller's graduation works. According to Wang Baiyuan's student recollection, his graduation work was a Japanese painting with several trees as the background and female portraits as the theme. This painting was originally decorated inside the Morioka Women's Normal School in Iwate Prefecture, Japan, but was destroyed by a fire on August 28, 1948.

Wang Baiyuan was not only interested in the literary and philosophical ideas of Indian poet Tagore but also had high expectations for Gandhi's Indian independence movement, Sun Yat-sen's Chinese revolutionary movement, and socialism. He wrote "The Poet Saint Tagore." In 1927 and "Gandhi and India's Independence Movement" in 1930 regarded India's Renaissance and independence movement as the precursor to Asia's liberation from imperialism.

Zhang Wenhuan once mentioned at Wang Baiyuan's farewell ceremony that when Wang Baiyuan was a teacher in Japan, due to his generous nature and often helping friends, his pockets were usually empty, and he did not have much money. In addition, Zhang Wenhuan,Wu Yongfu, Wu Chuo-liu, Zhu Zhaoyang, and others also miss Wang Baiyuan's kind attitude towards others, as well as his indifference towards money and fame.

In addition to being helpful, Wang Baiyuan often travels on behalf of his predecessors to search for collectibles.

Before studying in Japan, Wang Baiyuan had already married Ms. Chen Cao, but there was a significant gap in their education level and ideological concepts. After studying in Japan, Wang Baiyuan wanted to publish "The Way of Thorns." Still, he was worried that the publication of his poetry collection and the left-wing literary and artistic activities he wanted to engage in might affect his wife, so he voluntarily requested a divorce. During an interview with Chen Caikun, Zhang Fu, a student of Wang Baiyuan, briefly described the scene and mentioned that after Wang Baiyuan spoke, Chen Cao, who was cutting fruits at the time, was shocked and angry. He accidentally waved and cut Wang Baiyuan's hand. Seeing her husband bleeding profusely, Chen Cao could not bear it and had to agree to his request.

Wang Baiyuan was originally a student selected by the Taiwan Governor General's Office to study in Japan. Still, later, due to ideological issues, he could not return to Taiwan to teach. After graduating from the Normal School of Tokyo Academy of Fine Arts, Wang Baiyuan was unemployed for more than half a year. Later, through the recommendation of his Tokyo Academy of Fine Arts classmate Imai Kikuzang, Wang Baiyuan took over the vacancy at Iwate Normal Women's School (Imai Kikuzang left due to enlistment) and was hired. In addition to the help of classmates, the open-minded attitude of the school principal was also the key to Wang Baiyuan's employment.

After divorcing his first wife, Chen Cao, Wang Baiyuan fell in love with a student from a girls' school, Kubota Tanaka. They did not spend much time together. After Wang Baiyuan left Japan, he never returned to Japan to live with Kubota Takashi and his daughter due to personal instability and the impact of the turbulent situation.

Wang Baiyuan taught at Iwate Prefecture Normal Women's School in Japan for five years and nine months. In addition to meeting with Taiwanese students studying in Japan in Tokyo and secretly engaging in left-wing literary movements, Wang Baiyuan worked hard to teach art and guided students in playing tennis. The teacher is friendly and lively, with humorous speech and a smile on the face at all times, which students welcome. Due to the widespread sympathy and even support of students towards Wang Baiyuan's remarks, Wang Baiyuan often quickly shifted the topic from politics to art through the prompts of students or the sound of the principal's shoes during the tour; The principal also turned a blind eye to Wang Baiyuan's classroom discussions on politics and Taiwan issues. Wang Baiyuan had some contact with local literati and scholars in Morioka and had made friends with colleagues such as Shingo Matsumoto and members of the Iwate Poets Association, Koyama Kazuki. A scholar who studied Wang Baiyuan, Rongcheng Itaya, speculated that Wang Baiyuan was likely to communicate or have contact with the well-known writer Kenji Miyazawa and other local writers through printing or other forms. On September 22, 1932, while giving a lecture, Wang Baiyuan was detained by Japanese police on the podium. This scene left a deep impression on the students attending the class and caused a stir in the school. The reason for being detained is that Wang Baiyuan, along with Wu Kunhuang, Lin Dui, and other Taiwanese youth studying in Japan, organized the "Tokyo Taiwanese Cultural Association" on suspicion of engaging in anti-colonial movements. Afterward, Wang Baiyuan was dismissed by the school, lost his teaching position, and had to find another way out. After Wang Baiyuan left, his former students did not forget him. Some people visited Shanghai after Wang Baiyuan went to China. One of the students, Shan Hefang, later wrote an autobiographical novel called "Nanbu Zi" (published in 1979), which is based on the story of teacher Wang Baiyuan and fellow student Kubota Tanaka as the prototype characters, and their love, marriage, and forced separation as the basis for creation. Wang Baiyuan's number one enemy – Japanese spies. They were cautious in their investigation of Wang Baiyuan. They found that during his tenure as a teacher in Morioka, Iwate Prefecture, he had "lured Iwate Medical School students to organize" personal meetings "and tried to promote and incite their national consciousness." They also handed over such investigation reports to the Shanghai Consulate so that even if Wang Baiyuan went to Shanghai, China, he could not escape the fate of being monitored.

"He has received some praise in the left-wing literary world. He has exchanged information with left-wing youths such as Lin Dui and Wu Kunhuang, who lived in Tokyo, and they have naturally exchanged opinions on the proletarian art movement with each other."

Wang Baiyuan seems to have a bad reputation in the eyes of the Government-General of Taiwan's Office and the Japanese authorities. Wang Baiyuan, as a student selected by the Government-General of Taiwan's Office to study in Japan, was unable to return to Taiwan to teach due to ideological issues. While in Japan, I interacted with some left-wing individuals from Japan and Taiwan, even Communist Party members, and provided funds to left-wing activists such as Lin Dui and Wu Kunhuang. They also advocated and organized the "Tokyo Taiwanese Cultural Association," trying to use legal means to cover up illegality, allowing some members of the Taiwan Communist Party and the Japanese Communist Party to mix in and quietly communicate with the Taiwan Communist Party, the Chinese Communist Party, the Japanese Communist Party, the Japanese Red Rescue Association, and the left-wing groups in Japan and North Korea to establish a united front to fight against imperialism and feudalism.

=== When Wang Baiyuan was in mainland China ===
Wang Baiyuan was forced to separate from his Japanese wife, Kubota Takashi. After Wang Baiyuan arrived in the mainland, Kubota Tanaka still missed him and once sent him a letter. Wang Baiyuan's elementary school classmate and childhood friend Hsieh Tung-min once mentioned to many literary friends at a farewell party the night before his funeral. In the 17th year of the Republic of China, when he was studying at Sun Yat-Sen University in Guangzhou, he suddenly received a letter from a Japanese woman. When he opened it, he found that Wang Baiyuan's wife wrote the letter, and a paragraph inside said: "Love knows no borders." Wang's wife's true feelings towards her husband moved him very much.

After learning that his Japanese wife had given birth to a daughter, Wang Baiyuan was very happy but immediately fell into sadness. He wrote a poem to express his emotions, lamenting that he was "a person exiled by Japanese imperialists, and that his biological child cannot be called 'dad.' It's sad." (Wang Baiyuan, Shiwen).

After arriving in Shanghai, mainland China, Wang Baiyuan worked at Hualian News Agency, where he was responsible for "receiving Japanese news through radio, immediately translating it into Chinese, and providing it to relevant mainland authorities.", He is suspected of engaging in intelligence work. The deeds of Wang Baiyuan during his time in China are currently not well known in the literary community of Taiwan.

During the first one or two years of Wang Baiyuan's arrival in Shanghai, he often had contact with the Taiwan Art Research Association in Tokyo, Japan, and continued to send manuscripts. He also sent some novels by contemporary Chinese writers to Wu Kunhuang. Later, due to the magazine's suspension, the situation became increasingly tense, and he lost contact with his fellow writers in Tokyo.

Like many Taiwanese who went to the mainland to live and work during the Japanese rule period, Wang Baiyuan was in mainland China, where anti-Japanese sentiment was extremely high at that time. He was faced with the dilemma of calling himself a Taiwanese in front of the mainland people, and he also realized that his appearance was similar to that of the Japanese. In the article "The Record of the Point of Famore," he described it as follows: "Because (he) lived in the north for years, his nerves became weak, so he came to Shanghai and was surprised to find himself a Japanese." Despite this, Wang Baiyuan was still moved by the patriotic enthusiasm of the mainland people to resist Japan and held hope for the future of China.

In 1935, Wang Baiyuan went to Shanghai Academy of Fine Arts as a teacher in the Pattern Department. My colleague Huang Baofang recalled that his impression of Wang Baiyuan was "short in stature, with a Japanese style short mustache, and his appearance was no different from that of Japanese people. He also spoke fluent Japanese, which was almost indistinguishable from Japanese people. The shape of the road was also an eight-character foot, possibly due to his long-term residence in Japan and his habit of wearing wooden clogs. He was naturally quiet and reserved, but his teaching was solemn. The lecture notes he compiled were easy to understand and organize, and he could explain and compare the common points of ancient and modern patterns between China and foreign countries in detail, which was very popular among students. His sketching foundation was quite solid, and he must have worked hard in pattern changes and craftsmanship when he studied back then. Not only is it aesthetically pleasing, but it also retains the characteristic form of the physical object. Since the outbreak of the Shanghai War on August 13, it has been unknown where it went... The work includes an" Introduction to Patterns "and has conducted considerable research on the carving of Auguste Rodin.

Xie Lifa, who wrote "A Chronicle of Excavated Figures in Taiwan," once heard a rumor that Wang Baiyuan had served as a Japanese teacher for Jiang Qing (who was then an actor in Shanghai) during his time in China.

Wang Baiyuan's emotional journey was quite bumpy, and he divorced his first wife, Chen Cao, due to significant differences in education level and ideological beliefs; He Divorced his second wife, Kubota Takashi, for Decolonization in China; After arriving in mainland China, Wang Baiyuan married a woman of Sichuan nationality. However, after the 813 Incident, one day, when Wang Baiyuan took his pregnant wife to seek refuge at the French Consulate in Shanghai, he was arrested by the Japanese military police and forcibly escorted back to Taiwan, where he was imprisoned and served his sentence. From then on, he had no contact with that wife.

=== After Wang Baiyuan was repatriated to Taiwan ===
During his imprisonment, he created a painted screen and exhibited it at the Prisoner's Works Exhibition. Xie Lifa described it in more detail in his "Taiwan Excavated Figures Chronicle" and mentioned an exciting incident, stating: "Wang Baiyuan, who was imprisoned for six years, gained the greatest benefit from his life in prison. He developed a strong interest in handicrafts and learned the Maki-e (in Japanese, the clay and gold paintings on lacquerware). His works were exhibited at the" Prisoner's Works Exhibition "."After being released from prison, he learned that Yen Shui Long, an old art school classmate, was working hard to promote arts and crafts. Utilizing materials from Taiwan's local specialties to meet the needs of modern life, we are eager to create practical and decorative handicrafts. As a semi-expert, we collaborate with Yen Shui Long. At that time, a hotel near Taipei Station was owned by one of their friends. Every time Yen Shui-long went north, he would make plans to discuss the promotion of handicrafts in the hotel's living room. After talking several times, Yen Shui Long became annoyed and angrily said, "You only know how to talk. If we work together, I will be infuriated by you!"

Not long after his release from prison in 1943, Wang Baiyuan wrote an article titled "Miscellaneous Thoughts of the Sixth Government Exhibition" in response to his paintings at the Taipei City Hall. His writing style was quite sharp, and both Japanese and Taiwanese painters mercilessly commented on the advantages and disadvantages of his works. Wang Baiyuan cited Immanuel Kant, Leonardo da Vinci, Michelangelo, and others to illustrate the conditions that great artists should possess. Based on this, he examined the performance of exhibition authors and criticized Taiwanese painters for generally lacking philosophy and personality, and their works could not arouse the audience's joy, resulting in superficial and impoverished issues.

=== After the war/Nationalist government relocated to Taiwan ===
Due to the deep friendship between Wang Baiyuan and Xie Chunmu during his youth, many Taiwanese people came to Wang Baiyuan shortly after Japan surrendered, hoping to get in touch with Xie Chunmu, who may return to Taiwan to serve as an official (some say Xie Chunmu may become the Director of Civil Affairs or the Director of Police), which caused Wang Baiyuan to have a "nervous breakdown" (in Wang Baiyuan's words).

After the Chen Yi government ordered the suspension of the publication of the Political and Economic Daily and the Taiwan Review, Wang Baiyuan, and Su Xin joined forces with a group of left-wing youth to founded the Liberty Daily on October 15, 1946. This publication continued to be published until February 1947 but was discontinued due to the February 28 incident.

Wang Baiyuan often met with Wu Yongfu for some time, and the two of them frequently discussed the issue of Taiwan's new poetry and art.

In the early post-war period, Wang Baiyuan served as the director of the editorial department of the New Student Newspaper and became one of the sixteen directors of the Taiwan Cultural Association. He also served as the director of education and service and actively participated in the activities of the Association. However, after leaving the newspaper industry, Wang Baiyuan frequently switched careers and held positions in aluminum plate factories, the Red Cross, electrical appliance guilds, handicraft centers, and other institutions. He also served as a part-time lecturer at Datong University of Technology, the Chinese Academy of Culture (the predecessor of the "Chinese Culture University"), and the Practitioner's College. In addition to his unstable career, Wang Baiyuan was also oppressed by the Nationalist government and imprisoned three times. The first time was in the 228 Incident, and the second was in the Taiwan Communist Party's Cai Xiaoqian case. There were occasional surveillance and visits from emotional personnel at home.

Yang Kui once mentioned to others that after the war, he was imprisoned and saw Wu Hsin-jung. When Wu Hsin-jungmet he told him, "You finally came. Wang Baiyuan thinks about you every day and always asks why Yang Kui hasn't come yet!" As Wang Baiyuan was arrested a few weeks earlier than Yang Kui and had already been moved to another place, Wang Baiyuan and Yang Kui still could not meet in the end.

In 1959, the debate over orthodox traditional Chinese painting broke out. During the Japanese colonial period in Taiwan, painters who engaged in Eastern painting (also known as "Japanese painting") were criticized for their achievements and the value of their works. Wang Baiyuan published an article titled "Reflections on the Struggle of Traditional Chinese Painting Schools," which defended the existence value of Taiwanese Eastern painting by stating that "Eastern painting (Japanese painting) inherited the development of the Northern School of Chinese painting." Unfortunately, it was not successful. The authorities and the system ultimately used political power to forcefully exclude Taiwan's Oriental paintings from provincial exhibitions and orthodox traditional Chinese paintings.

Wang Baiyuan "can often tell at a glance from the bustling crowds on the streets that those people are intelligence personnel and those people are line workers set up by relevant units. He can guess eight or nine without leaving ten."

Ni Yun'e, the wife of Wang Baiyuan, once said to others, "Throughout his life, Bai Yuan loved listening to classical music, humming a few Taiwanese songs, and playing tennis and table tennis. Although he didn't quite understand ancient poetry, he preferred to recite it, but his favorite was women." In addition, Wang Chang-hsiung also mentioned that Wang Baiyuan often quoted Tagore's lines: "Women! You wrap your tears around the world's heart like the ocean wraps around the earth!"

At 9:50 pm on October 3, 1965, Wang Baiyuan died due to uremia caused by kidney stones. On the evening of October 8, the day before his funeral, Wang Baiyuan's former friends gathered in the hall of the funeral home, presided over by Wang Chang-hsiung. Each person recounted Wang Baiyuan's life story, which is said to be the most exciting and moving anecdote from the "Formosa" era in Tokyo, narrated by Wu Kunhuang and Zhang Wenhuan. Due to Wang Baiyuan's lifelong love for singing Japanese singer Masao Koga's "Muying" and the interlude in the movie "White Fuji Ridge," these two songs were played as the final farewell song at the farewell party.

== Assessment ==
Song Dongyang (real name: Chen Fangming) compared the poetic styles of three Japanese colonial poets – Yang Hua, Loa Ho, and Wang Baiyuan – and believed that they were all interveners in the political movement, and their works were enough to represent the setbacks, pride, and achievements of the beginning of new poetry. They had once served as Japanese supervisors, and they all made specific contributions to the political movement in Taiwan. However, their works exhibited different appearances. Yang Hua's poetry is gloomy and pessimistic; Loa Ho's poetry is passionate and leaping; Wang Baiyuan's poetry is gentle on the outside but firm on the inside. Among them, Wang Baiyuan's poetry best expresses the achievements of the new poetry creation period (Omitted)... When evaluating the works of the initial stage of Taiwan's new poetry, Wang Baiyuan's poetry cannot be easily overlooked. When dealing with the themes of poetry, he was not as transparent as Yang Hua or contemporary poets, and his use of words was not as careless as Loa Ho's. In addition to his language style and rhetorical skills, Chen Fangming highly praises Wang Baiyuan. He said, "Wang Baiyuan uses metaphors and highly circuitous techniques to connect a humble heart with the vast emotions of the human world, allowing us to see that the poet's ideas are no longer personal but belong to the masses.". His poetry may not have a special significance in an ordinary society; however, placing such exquisite works in a colonial society cannot but produce rich symbolic meanings.

In his book "Unearthed Figures in Taiwan," Xie Lifa positioned Wang Baiyuan as a "hero of resistance against Japan" and a "cultural fighter of democracy.". Xie Lifa highly praised Wang Baiyuan's new poetry creation and poetry collection publication and wrote in his "Taiwan Unearthed Character Chronicle": "Following the Wind (according to: Xie Chunmu)" Later, during the same period as Wang Baiyuan, there were around Zhang Wujun, Loa Ho, Yang Yun-pin, Shi Wenqi, Jiang Xiaomei, Yang Shouyu, Zhu Dianren, Yang Hua, Kuo Shui-t'an, and Wu Hsin-Jung who were engaged in the creation of new poetry, while those who published poetry collections were probably only Zhang Wujun's "Love in the Chaotic Capital" (1925), Chen Qiyun's "Heat Flow" (1931), and Wang Baiyuan's "The Way of Thorns." It is said that "The Way of Thorns" has been highly praised by the Japanese left-wing poetry circle, But I do not know the details. If Wang Baiyuan were to be called one of the representative writers in Taiwan's early new poetry scene, no one would have any objection to it [45] Regarding the different stages of Wang Baiyuan's life, Xie Lifa's conclusion is: "Looking back at Wang Baiyuan's brief 63 year life, there were two stages that were the climax of his life and also the most brilliant period of his life: the first stage was from 1931 to 1933, when he engaged in the 'Taiwanese Cultural Circle' with Wu Kunhuang, Zhang Wenhuan, and others in Tokyo (note: also translated as' Taiwanese Cultural Fellowship Association ')." The activities of the Taiwan Art Research Association were held around the age of thirty, when his ideals of "innocence and naivety" shone brightly in him. At this moment, he fully displayed the image of "Revolutionary Poet Wang Baiyuan"; Another stage was from his release from prison in 1944 to his return to prison in 1947, during his three years of prime from leaving the Japanese prison to entering the Chinese jail. He devoted himself to cultural reconstruction and exchange as a member of the Taiwan Cultural Council, dedicating himself to promoting democratic culture. He portrayed Wang Baiyuan as a critic who fought for social reform with sharp criticism. These two stages, one during his thirties and one at the age of forty, are combined into one lasting at least five years. In the remaining years, he was first an average and an art student with a heart as clear as a mirror (as Xie Chunmu said). After 1933, he returned to his desired homeland and served in newspapers and art education. Furthermore, life in prison deprived him of his precious youth. After 1947, he was buried in historical materials and documents and was a living dictionary of the time.

Yan Juanying believes that Xie Lifa's portrayal of "anti-Japanese heroes" and "democratic cultural fighters" is not suitable for Wang Baiyuan.[1] She believes that Wang Baiyuan is a person who advocates for art to transcend nationality and emphasizes universality and universality. However, Yan Juanying sympathized with and criticized Wang Baiyuan's political stance in 1950, as well as his discussion of the Taiyang Art Exhibition and modern painting in Taiwan from an anti-Japanese perspective in "History of Taiwan Art Movement." The sympathy lies in Yan Juanying's belief that the reason why Wang Baiyuan "unilaterally discussed folk art groups from the perspective of anti-Japanese national consciousness" is not only due to personal ideological factors but also critical historical factors; Because Wang Baiyuan was concerned that the ruling mainland's political groups in Taiwan would not be able to accept Taiwanese artists, he repeatedly emphasized the nationalism of the Taiwanese art community, especially the nationalist spirit demonstrated by hosting the Taiyang Art Exhibition. The criticism lies in Yan Juanying's point: "Most of the artists during the Japanese occupation period belonged to a small group of people who had received a good education in society and had never taken to the streets for the nationalist movement.". In short, during the stage when the ethnic political groups in Taiwan were not fully formed, discussing how the Taiyang Art Exhibition or any modern Taiwanese painting could specifically 'showcase the characteristics of the Chinese nation' or 'resist Japanese discrimination and oppression' was nothing but a political lie of the 1950s In addition, regarding Wang Baiyuan's research on Taiwanese art, Yan Juanying believes that there are still two points that need to be reviewed. Firstly, consider future generations' political taboos or beliefs and explain the development of art in Taiwan during the Japanese colonial period with this mindset. Secondly, Wang Baiyuan's research and organization overly rely on literature and ignore specific artworks.

Chen Caikun, who translated and edited Wang Baiyuan's works, believes that Wang Baiyuan's concept or spirit of loneliness is "vastly different from the common" extensive head disease "and shallow practical orientation of Taiwanese people. Today, the modernization of Taiwan must be transformed from" quantitative expansion "to" qualitative improvement, "which needs to be greatly promoted. There are no other reasons, but only those with a sincere spirit of loneliness can set the pace and embark on a sacred land that no one can achieve.". Only in this way can we cultivate innovative talents in academic culture and compete with others for their strengths and weaknesses.

Luo Xiuzhi positioned Wang Baiyuan as "a coordinate star on the cultural map of Taiwan," believing that "this cultural map will always be" unfinished "and" forever progressive, "with the need for supplementation, modification, and deletion at any time... And Wang Baiyuan's coordinate star may also outline completely different shapes due to different reference coordinates drawn by different writers.". Regarding Wang Baiyuan's art criticism and art history articles, Luo Xiuzhi believes that Wang Baiyuan "faces the limitations of colonial history and even cannot break free from the framework of Han ethnic historical and modern art views." The Taiwan art history he strives to present still needs to be clarified in appearance. His view on art history is contradictory and complex because it includes two incompatible ideologies – left-wing literary concepts that transcend national identity and nationalism that emphasizes blood ties to the homeland. In addition, Luo Xiuzhi also examined Wang Baiyuan's artistic taste and found that the art education of public schools and Tokyo Art School profoundly influenced him. "The aesthetic standards he followed were still very academic, emphasizing the expression of basic painting techniques such as lines, colors, composition, and the coordination and unity of images." Based on this principle, he appreciated individual painters and their works. Secondly, in her book "Complete Collection of Taiwanese Art Critics - Wang Baiyuan Volume," she gave an example to demonstrate that "Wang Baiyuan also used Japanese aesthetic standards to judge in many places.". After examining Wang Baiyuan's art criticism and his historical views and thoughts on art history, she believes that he has not yet formed a specific, complete, and systematic personal art theory system. What can be determined is that "Geography of Taiwan" is the most critical benchmark for Wang Baiyuan to construct his artistic thinking system.

In his book "Taiwan Modern and Contemporary Art Fengshen Ranking - Advanced Painting Theory - Five Steps," Wang Fudong included an article titled "The Way of Thorns, Wang Baiyuan," which stated that "Wang Baiyuan is not only a poet, writer, and painter, but also the first art critic in Taiwan's art history.". The article states that in 1947, Wang Baiyuan experienced a series of brutal blows due to the February 28 incident, and it was not until his later years that he began actively organizing literature. For some time, Wang Baiyuan often met with Wu Yongfu, and the two frequently talked deeply about the development of new poetry and art in Taiwan. In the early post-war period, Wang Baiyuan served as the director of the editorial department of the "New Life Newspaper" and became one of the sixteen directors of the "Taiwan Cultural Association." He also served as the director of education and service and actively participated in the activities of the Association. During this period, Wang Baiyuan often wrote commentary articles on art exhibitions. On October 3, 1965, Wang Baiyuan died at the age of 63 due to Uremia caused by Kidney stone disease. Wang Baiyuan's memorial service was hosted by Wang Changxiong, the author of "Ruan Ruo Da Happy Inner Doors and Windows." During the memorial service, Wang Baiyuan's wife Ni Yun'e said, "... The woman Baiyuan loved the most in his life was a woman..." During his speech, Wang Changxiong specifically mentioned that Wang Baiyuan had quoted a line from Tagore's poem: "Woman! You wrap your tears around the heart of the world, just like the ocean wraps around the earth!" Wang Fudong wrote in "The Road to Thorns.", At the end of the article "Wang Baiyuan", it is said that "So! As the first person in Taiwan's art review, Wang Baiyuan, like his favorite woman, also loves the art he loves with the words: 'Tears wrap around the heart of the world', just like the ocean wraps around the earth!"

== Publication and publication status of works ==
For the writing and publication of his works, please refer to the "List of Wang Baiyuan's Literary Works." Using the "Taiwan Bibliography Integration Query System," the publication status of Wang Baiyuan's works up to now (September 15, 2014) is as follows:

- "The Way of Life", first edition in 1931 (Showa 6), Kubo Village, Morioka City, Japan. The library of Taiwan University has a collection of this book.
- Chen Caikun/Chinese translation, "Wang Baiyuan: The Road of Thorns" (Part 1) (Part 2), Changhua County Cultural Center, 1995—In addition to the poetry and prose of "The Way of Thorns," the book also includes several important political, dramatic, and artistic critiques by Wang Baiyuan.
- Wang Baiyuan's new Japanese poems "The Groundhog" and "Sunflower" are included in the translated version of Lin Ruiming's "National Anthology: Modern Poetry Volume I."
- Some of Wang Baiyuan's poems "The Way of Thorns" are included in the "Taiwan Poetry Collection." The book was published by the Japanese Green Shadow Study in 2003.
- Wang Baiyuan's new Japanese poems "Unfinished Portrait" and "Mole" were translated into Chinese by Chen Qianwu and included in the "Selected Poems Translated by Chen Qianwu" edited by Chen Mingtai.
- Mo Yu/Editor and translator, "The Way of Wang Baiyuan's Thorns," published by Morning Star in 2008.
- It is known that scholar Liu Shuqin translated these poems into Chinese and presented them in the specialized book "The Road to Thorns: Literary Activities and Cultural Struggle of Taiwanese Youth Traveling in Japan."

== See also ==
- National Taipei University of Education students who were in the same class as Wang Baiyuan are known to include Hsieh Nan-kuang, Guo Baichuan (painter), Lin Weikun (novelist), Zhu Zhaoyang (educator), Hsieh Tung-min, and others.
- People who have had a profound influence on Wang Baiyuan's thoughts and have good relationships include Xie Chunmu and others.
- Famous figures who profoundly influenced his thoughts included Gandhi, Tagore, Sun Yat Sen, and others.
- While in Japan, Wang Baiyuan organized various clubs, such as the Taiwanese Cultural Association and the Taiwan Art Research Association (official magazine: Formosa).
- After the war, I participated in the Taiwan Cultural Association (official magazine: Taiwan Culture (magazine)).
- She previously worked in the following institutions: Taiwan Daily News (before 1945), editor and main contributor of Taiwan Culture (Magazine) of the Taiwan Cultural Council, editor in chief of Li Chunqing's Taiwan Review, editor in chief of Taiwan New Life Daily, and Red Cross Society of Cai Peihuo.
