= Wu Kunhuang =

Taiwanese literature creator

Wu Kunhuang (1909–1989), pen names "Wu Yesheng", "Kitamura Toshio", and "Yuyu Huangsheng", was a literature creator from Nantou, Taiwan.

== Life ==
While studying at Taichung Normal School, Wu Kunhuang dropped out to initiate Student activism. Later, he went to Tokyo to study and graduated from the Department of Arts at Nihon University and the Department of Liberal Arts at Meiji University.

In 1933, he and Zhang Wenhuan, Wang Baiyuan, Liu Jie, Su Weixiong, Shi Xuexi, Wu Yongfu, and others initiated the organization of the "Taiwan Art Research Association," and participated in the publication of literary magazines such as “フォルモサ，” "Formosa" and "Taiwan Alliance for Literature and Arts," and was also responsible for the affairs of the Tokyo branch of the Taiwan Literary and Art League. At the same time, through poetry writing and drama performances, he established cross-border connections with many Left-wing politics and artistic societies in East Asia, exchanges spread across Taiwan, Japan, China, and North Korea, and thus forged friendships with Choi Seung-hee, Lei Shiyu, and others.

During the Second Sino-Japanese War, he lived in Beijing and returned home after marriage and having children.

1951 in Taiwan, the Taiwanese authorities sent him to Green Island to serve a 10-year sentence without trial because he had leftist ideas.

== Genre and style ==
Wu Kunhuang's works are a genre of modern Chinese poetry and literary criticism, appearing in Taiwan Literature and Art, Taiwan Xinmin Daily, Taiwan News, Japan's Poetry God, Chinese, and Foreign Magazine, and China's Poetry Magazine.

In his works, Wu Kunhuang often uses buffaloes, black drongo, egrets, and chinaberry trees to express his longing for his hometown. He also uses street Rōnin, factory workers, artists who died in foreign countries, and Dissident to accuse the authorities of injustice.

== Work ==
Wu Kunhuang's Japanese poem "People Wandering in the Wilderness" was translated into Chinese by Taiwanese poet Chen Qianwu after the war and was later included in "Selected Poems Translated by Chen Qianwu" edited by Chen Mingtai. His life's works have been edited into a book by his son Wu Yanhe and scholar Chen Shurong and published by the National Taiwan University Publishing Center. Wu Kunhuang wrote and published some articles in literary journals after the war. Using the "Taiwan Journal Article Indexing System" query, as of October 23, 2014, there were several articles:

Wu Kunhuang/author, "Memories of the Establishment of the Taiwan Art Research Association and the Founding of "Formosa", "Taiwan Literature and Art," May 1982, pp. 334–338.

Wu Kunhuang/author, "In Memory of Brother Wen Huan," "Taiwan Literature and Art," March 1983, pp. 57–86.

Wu Kunhuang/Author, Peng Xuan/Translation, "On Taiwan's Vernacular Literature," "Literature Taiwan," April 2001, pp. 27–41.

== Related research ==
=== Doctoral and Master's Dissertations ===
Using the "Taiwan Doctoral and Master's Dissertation Knowledge Value-added System" to search, as of October 23, 2014, the known ones are:

Liu Shuqin, "The Path of Thorns: Literary Activities and Cultural Struggles of Young People in Japan", Ph.D. dissertation of the Department of Chinese Literature of Tsinghua University, 2000.

Zhao Xunda, "The Three-Line Conflict of "Popularization of Literature and Art": Cultural Thinking and Struggle of Left-wing and Right-wing Intellectuals and New Traditionalists in Taiwan in the 1930s", Ph.D. dissertation of the Institute of Taiwan Literature of National Cheng Kung University, 2008.

Xu Weiying, "Dancing at Sunset: The Situation and Breakthrough of Pioneers of Taiwan's Dance Art from Japanese Occupation to the Early Postwar Period," Ph.D. dissertation of the Department of Sociology of Tunghai University, 2013.

=== Collection of Dissertations ===
There is no relevant article using the "Taiwan Literature, History, and Philosophy Dissertation Collection Indexing System" as of October 23, 2014. Among other books that include Wu Kunhuang's poems and essays, only one was found:

Chen Qianwu, "The Light of Nantou Literature - Wu Kunhuang's Poem "People Drifting in the Wilderness" is included in the "2008 Nantou Literature Academic Symposium Papers", published by the Nantou County Cultural Bureau in 2008.

Journal Papers and Reviews

Using the "Taiwan Journal Paper Indexing System" to search, as of October 23, 2014, the following are known:

Xie Shuangtian, "Interview with Advanced Literary Writers: A Poet Who Sets Off Again - Interview with Mr. Wu Kunhuang," "Central Monthly," May 1982, pp. 90–92.

Huang Guoshu, "The Development of Taiwan's Left-wing Theater Movement during the Japanese Occupation," "Contemporary," August 1988, pp. 34–45.

Huang Qichun, "Local Literature Debate and Taiwanese Vernacular Movement under the Socialism Thought during the Japanese Occupation," "Chinese and Foreign Literature," February 1995, pp. 56–74.

Yang Ziqiao, "Pre-war Taiwanese New Poetry," Guowen Tiandi, October 2000, pp. 16–25.

Yeh Ti, "Sketch of Wu Kunhuang - A Cultural Person's Spiritual Landscape," Genesis Poetry Magazine, October 2004, pp. 336–341.

Cui Moshun, "The Formation and Development of the Left-wing Literary Movement in Taiwan during the Japanese Occupation Period," Journal of Taiwan Literature, December 2005, pp. 149–172.

Zhang Wenxun, "The Struggle for the Voice of Taiwan's Literary Circles in the 1930s - Repositioning Formosa", Journal of Taiwan Literature Research, February 2006, pp. 105–125.

Liu Shuqin, "The Marginal Battle of Taiwanese Literature: Writers in Japan in the Cross-domain Left-wing Literary Movement," Journal of Taiwan Literature Research, May 2007, pp. 51–84.

Lin Qi-yu, "Re-examining the "meaning map" of Nantou—Analysis of the development model of Nantou's new literature since the Japanese occupation," "Taipei University of Education Language and Literature Journal," July 2008, pp. 29–56.

Chen Shu-Rong, "Rereading Wu Kun-Huang: A Historical Study of Thoughts and Actions," "Literary Taiwan," July 2013, pp. 43–72.

=== Related books (including articles in them) ===
Yang Zi-Qiao, "Social Realist Poet--Wu Kun-Huang," originally included in "Penglai Articles and Taiwanese Poems" published by Yuanjing Publishing House, and later included in "Mysterious Tentacles" (published by Tai Li Publishing House in 1996).

Zhu Shuang-yi, "Presenting the prosperous literary creation in the development period--Poetry creation inside and outside the left-wing literary and artistic groups such as Wang Bai-yuan and Chen Qi-yun (Wu Kun-Huang part)," "History of Taiwan Literature" (Volume 1), Fuzhou, Strait Literature and Art Publishing House, 1991.

Liu Shuqin, The Path of Thorns: Literary Activities and Cultural Struggles of Taiwanese Youth in Japan, Lianjing Publishing House, first edition 2009.

Chen Shurong and Wu Yanhe/eds. Poems and Essays by Wu Kunhuang, NTU Publishing Center, 2013.

== Related entries ==
Taiwan Art Research Association

People who interacted with him during his stay in Japan: Wang Baiyuan, Zhang Wenhuan, Lin Dui, and Su Weixiong.
