= Formosa (magazine) =

Japanese literary magazine

Formosa (Chinese: 福尔摩沙, Japanese: フォルモサ) is a Japanese literary magazine published during the Japanese colonial period in Taiwan. Its publishing organization was the "Taiwan Art Research Society," founded by a group of Taiwanese students studying in Japan in Tokyo on March 20, 1932. Its founding purpose was "to promote the advancement of Taiwanese literature and art."

== Predecessors of issuing agencies ==
=== The formation and dissolution ===
The predecessor of the Taiwan Art Research Association was the left-wing literary group "Taiwanese Cultural Association." In June 1931, Wang Baiyuan's collection of poems and essays, "The Thorny Road," was published. After reading this collection of poems and essays, a radical left-wing youth, Lin Dui, whether he was moved by the socialism in the collection or out by the usual rational calculations of politicians and business people, felt that the author's political ideology was similar to his own. He could be won over and began to correspond with Wang Baiyuan. After chatting, the two exchanged opinions on the proletarian art movement and finally proposed a plan to organize the Taiwan Proletarian Cultural Alliance.

On March 25, 1932, Lin Dui, Wang Baiyuan, Wu Kunhuang, and others decided to establish the "Taiwanese Cultural Association" as the first step to organize the Taiwan Proletarian Cultural Alliance. They also tried to use this legal cover-up to allow some members of the Taiwan Communist Party and the Japanese Communist Party to mix in and secretly communicate with the Taiwan Communist Party, the Chinese Communist Party, the Japanese Communist Party, the Japanese Red Rescue Association, and the left-wing groups in Japan and Korea to establish a united front to fight against imperialism and feudalism. On July 31 of the same year, Lin Dui, Wang Baiyuan, Wu Kunhuang, and others met to discuss the publication of the association's journal NEWS and fund-raising issues. However, the good times did not last long. On September 1 of the same year, Ye Qiumu, an association member, was reported for participating in an anti-imperialist demonstration. The Japanese authorities discovered the news of the establishment and operation of the Taiwanese Cultural Association. Afterward, Lin Dui, Zhang Wenhuan, Wang Baiyuan, Zhang Lixu, and others were arrested by the Japanese police, and the association disintegrated and disappeared.

=== Records of the authorities ===
"According to the Police History of the Government-General of Taiwan Office Police Bureau, the Taiwan Art Research Society was a cultural organization under the Japan Proletarian Culture Federation. Its predecessor was the left-wing literary group Taiwan Cultural Association organized by Wang Baiyuan, Lin Dui, Wu Kunhuang and others on March 20, 1932. The organization was disbanded in September of the same year. However, despite being closely monitored and warned, Wang Baiyuan and others did not give up their ideals. They overcame problems such as insufficient funds and disputes over their course of action and formally formed the Taiwan Art Research Society in March 1933. They also published Formosa, which was more "literary" than "revolutionary."

== Purpose of publication ==
After being released, Zhang Wenhuan, Wu Kunhuang, and other members of the Taiwanese Cultural Association decided to form a legal and moderate literary group, "Taiwan Art Research Association," with other young people in Japan. After a fierce debate, the official magazine "Formosa" was published. So on March 29, 1932, Su Weixiong, Wei Zhengchun, Zhang Wenhuan, Wu Hongqiu, Wu Yongfu, Huang Botang, Wang Baiyuan, Liu Jie (Taiwanese writer), Wu Kunhuang and others proposed to establish the Taiwan Art Research Association in Tokyo, to improve and create new Taiwanese literature and art. The editor-in-chief of its official magazine was Su Weixiong, the editor was Zhang Wenhuan, and the publisher was Shi Xuexue. The publication was founded on July 15, 1933. Although they did not directly state the purpose of the "Taiwan Art Research Association," from the few paragraphs in the publication's introductory text, we can see that the literary and artistic magazine is based on Taiwan's folk art and literary traditions (which are cultural assets inherited from China) and attempts to create literature and art that truly reflects the spirit of the Taiwanese people. The magazine's introductory text reads: "Although there is a cultural heritage of thousands of years, the people who are still in this special situation have not yet produced their own culture." "Therefore, colleagues often take it as their responsibility to improve this kind of literature and art and boldly take the lead in independence." "On the negative side, we want to organize and study the literary and artistic works that have always been weak to match the folk art, such as folk songs and legends that are popular among the public; on the positive side, the special atmosphere mentioned above has generated our full spirit, our thoughts, and feelings from the heart, and we are determined to create new literature and art that truly needs Taiwanese people. We are very willing to re-create "Taiwanese literature and art."

== Important works published ==
The magazine published three issues in total, with various columns. In terms of reviews, there are articles such as Su Weixiong's "A Trial Discussion on Taiwanese Ballads," Yang Xingdong's "Expectations of Taiwanese Literary Circles," Liu Jie (Taiwanese writer)'s "Taiwanese Literary Circles in 1933", and Wu Kunhuang's "On Taiwanese Native Literature." In terms of novels, there are Zhang Wenhuan's "Falling Buds" and "Chastity"; Wu Yongfu's "Head and Body" and "Black Dragon"; Wu Tianshang's "Dragon"; Wang Baiyuan's "Don Juan and Gapony"; Lai Qing's "Concubine Controversy"; Wu Xisheng's "Pig"; Zhang Bihua's "Waxing Moon" and so on. In terms of poetry, there are Shi Xuexue’s “Suicide,”; Su Weixiong’s “Spring Night Hate,” “Mute Poet,” and “Unchanging Guest,”; Wang Baiyuan’s “The Hard Road” and “Lovely K-son” and many other poems that integrate Tagore, Ishikawa Takuboku and Socialism; Yang Jizhen’s “Poem”; Chen Chuanzhuan’s “Haze of Contradiction”; Chen Zhaobai’s “Destiny”; Weng Nao’s “Tamsui Seaside”; Wang Dengshan’s “Scenery of Salt Fields”; Tuo Wei’s “Under the Purple Mountain” and other poems.

== Reasons for suspension and dissolution of issuing agency ==
After the third issue was published on June 15, 1934, the magazine was forced to cease publication due to lack of funds. The magazine's founders and writers also joined the Taiwan Alliance for Literature and Arts and became members of the Tokyo branch of the Taiwan Alliance for Literature and Arts. The Taiwan Art Research Association disbanded on its own. "The association's headquarters was located in Tokyo, and its publications were also published in Tokyo. It had little influence on Taiwan. After the third issue of Formosa magazine, it ceased publication on June 15, 1934, and was merged with Taiwan Literature and Art."

== Historical positioning ==
Researcher Huang Te-shih believes that: "The founders of Formosa magazine were all students who majored in literature, philosophy or art at various universities in Japan. Therefore, they could use modern Western literature to create and promote literary movements. Their desire to promote literary movements was powerful and ardent, and they were determined not to give up until they created a new kind of literature. They placed particular emphasis on the creation of novels and poems. At the same time, they also attached great importance to the compilation of past cultural heritage, such as the collection of folk songs and current literary criticism."

== Original collection and reproduction status ==
Using the "National Library Catalog Information Network" to search, as of October 10, 2011, the National Taiwan Normal University collected a reproduction published by the Oriental Culture Bookstore in 1981. As for the original collection and microfilm collection, no original collection or microfilm collection was found.

== Related research ==
=== Doctoral and master's theses ===
Using the "Taiwan Doctoral and Master's Theses Knowledge Value-added System" and the "National Book Catalog Information Network" to search, as of October 10, 2011, no doctoral and master's theses specifically use this literary magazine as the primary research object, and only related studies use this literary magazine as the object of examination.

Liu Shuqin, "The Path of Thorns: Literary Activities and Cultural Struggles of Young People in Japan," the doctoral dissertation of the Department of Chinese Literature, Tsinghua University, 2000.

Deng Huien, "A Study on the Translation of Foreign Thoughts during the Japanese Occupation: Focusing on Loa Ho, Yang Kui, and Zhang Wojun," master's thesis of the Institute of Taiwan Literature, Tsinghua University, 2006. This thesis discusses the translation of foreign thoughts during the Japanese occupation period in Taiwan. The thesis examines 11 literary magazines mainly published on the island of Taiwan, whose activities were conducted primarily by Taiwanese people, and "Formosa" is one of them.

Chen Yunyuan, "Island Capital and Imperial Capital: Urban Images of Taiwanese Novels in the 1920s and 1930s (1922-1937)", Master's thesis, Institute of Taiwanese Literature, National Taiwan University, 2007.

Zhang Wenxun, 〈植民地プロレタリア青年の文芸再生: 张文环を中心とした"フオルモサ"世代の台湾文学〉"The Literary Rebirth of Colonial Proletarian Youth: Taiwanese Literature of the "Folmosa" Generation Centered on Zhang Wenhuan," Department of Chinese Language and Literature, Graduate School of Humanities and Social Sciences, University of Tokyo. This thesis is available at the National Chengchi University and National Library.

=== Collected papers ===
Using the "Taiwan Literature, History, and Philosophy Collected Papers Indexing System," as of October 10, 2011, no paper has taken this magazine as its leading research object.

=== Papers and reviews in journals ===
Using the Taiwan Journal Paper Indexing System, as of October 10, 2011, the following are known:

- Zhang Wenxun, "Aiming at literary creation--Introduction to Formosa," February 2011, Wenxun.
- Liu Sifang, "Young Japanese Literary Students Standing on the Trend Line: On the Popularity of Formosa and Wu Yongfu's "New Feeling" Writing," January 2009, Taiwan Literary Review.
- Yokomichi Keiko, "Mixed Body--On Wu Yongfu in the 'Formosa' Era," December 2008, National Taiwan University Japanese Language Research.
- Zhang Wenxun, "Struggle for the Voice of Taiwan's Literary Circles in the 1930s--Repositioning Formosa", February 2006, Taiwan Literary Research Journal.
- Wu Kunhuang, “Recollections of the Establishment of the Taiwan Art Research Association and the Founding of Formosa,” Taiwan Literature and Art, May 1982.
- Shi Xuexi, “The Establishment of the Taiwan Art Research Association and the Founding of Formosa,” Taipei Cultural Relics, May 1954.

=== Books ===
Using the National Library Bibliography Information Network, as of October 10, 2011, the following are known:

- Liu Shuqin, “The Path of Thorns: Literary Activities and Cultural Struggles of Taiwanese Youth in Japan,〈フォルモサ〉” Taipei: Lianjing Publishing, first edition 2009.
- Kawahara Isao/author, Mo Suwei/translator, “The Development of the New Literary Movement in Taiwan: The Connection with Japanese Literature,” Taipei: Quanhua Science and Technology Books, 2004.
- Mo Suwei/author, “Tokyo’s Taiwan Art Research Association” and “Folmosa,” Senriyama Literary Collection 43, Kansai University, Japan, 1990.

== See also ==
- The publishing organization of this literary magazine is the Taiwan Art Research Association.
- The colleagues of this magazine include Zhang Wenhuan, Wu Yongfu, Wang Baiyuan, Wu Kunhuang, Liu Jie (Taiwanese writer), Su Weixiong and others.
- Other literary and artistic groups and publications related to it are the Taiwan Alliance for Literature and Arts and Taiwan Literature and Art.
