= Saline Land =

Saline Land (Chinese: 鹽分地帶) is a term in the history of Taiwanese literature that generally refers to a relatively unique literary group with a distinctive local color that spontaneously formed in the salty coastal areas in Beimen County, Tainan Prefecture, after the birth of New Taiwanese Literature during the Japanese rule period. On May 15, 1988, the group members organized the "Taiwan PEN Saline Land Branch", which became the first branch of the Taiwan PEN.

== Style ==
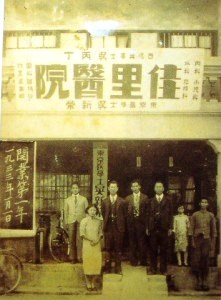
On January 1, 1933, Dr. Wu Hsin-jung and others gathered in front of Jiali Hospital in Tainan.

The literature of Saline Land often depicts the scenery and people of the salt villages, embodying the local atmosphere and expressing the strong spirit of resisting the invasion of foreign people. It shows the hardworking, simple, and unyielding character and virtues of the local people in their struggle against the barren natural environment. Since its foundation, new poetry has dominated the literature of Saline Land. As a result, during the Japanese rule period, this region was known as the "Hometown of Poets", with local poets such as Wu Hsin-jung (吳新榮) forming a poetry community of Saline Land in Taiwan.

Wu Hsin-jung believed that the literary group in the Saline Land during the Japanese rule was a naturally formed small community. This group, aside from the friendships among its members, lacked a strict organization or rules. It wasn't until it transformed into a branch of the Taiwan Alliance for Literature and Arts that it became integrated into the broader cultural movement system in Taiwan.

== Activities ==
Several writers in Saline Land organized literary groups using their existing connections and financial resources, planning and hosting large-scale literary events, such as "Saline Land Literary Camp" (鹽分地帶文藝營) and "Nankunshen Taiwanese Literature Camp" (南鯤鯓台語文學營). In addition, literary enthusiasts in Saline Land have published Literature of Saline Land (鹽分地帶) literary anthologies, series, etc., either paying for it themselves or relying on their publishers. The above-mentioned activities consolidate the local writers and literary enthusiasts, encouraging them to identify with the literature and culture of Saline Land.

The literary tradition of Saline Land continues to be developed and passed down. Every year, the Taiwanese literary community organizes a youth literary camp at Nankunshen Temple (南鯤鯓代天府) in the Beimen District, Tainan City, which is attended by hundreds of people. Novels, poetry, and essays are all included on the agenda. Authors, poets, and critics are invited to give lectures here, facilitating the exchange of literary experience and promoting literary creation in a positive way.
