= Hsieh Li-fa =

Taiwanese writer and painter

- 謝里法（謝理發）
- Born: March 28, 1938; Taipei, Taiwan
- Education: National Taiwan Normal University; Beaux-Arts de Paris
- Occupations: Painter, art historian, art critic, curator, writer
- Organization(s): Fifth Moon Group; Paris Foundation for Culture and Education
- Notable work: A History of Art Movements in Taiwan During the Japanese Era; A Journal of Unearthed Figures in Taiwan; Purple Dadaocheng (novel); Primary Color Dadaocheng—Shaih Lifa Talks About Himself (autobiography); Cow Series

Hsieh Li-fa (Chinese: 謝里法; pinyin: Xiè Lǐfǎ; Wade–Giles: Hsieh^{4} Li^{3}-fa^{3}; born March 28, 1938), also known as Shaih Li-fa and Xie Lifa, is a Taiwanese artist, writer, and art historian.

Hsieh was a member of the Fifth Moon Group and crossed over to literature. He was also involved in the founding of groups such as the Taiwan Literature Research Association and the Taiwan Cultural Exchange Center. In 1993, he co-founded the Paris Cultural and Educational Foundation with Liao Shiou-ping and T. F. Chen and established the "Paris Prize" to help talented young artists study abroad.

Hsieh Li-fa
- Chinese: 謝里法
- Traditional Chinese: 謝里法
- Simplified Chinese: 谢里法
Transcriptions
Standard Mandarin
- Hanyu Pinyin: Sièh Lǐ Fǎ

Prints made by Hsieh Li-fa are held in the collection of the Museum of Modern Art in New York City. Since 1996, he has lived in Beitun District of Taichung City. He has promoted environmentally friendly art in Changhua County, Taiwan. The installation artwork "Drifting Light Coordinate" is located in Fubao Ecological Park, Fuxing Township, Changhua County, made of 374 pieces of driftwood. He has previously taught at National Taiwan Normal University's postgraduate Department of Fine Arts.

He is the author of many books related to Taiwanese art, including A History of Art Movements in Taiwan During the Japanese Era and Talking About Art with A Li (also known as Art Letters: A Li). In 1981, A History of Art Movements in Taiwan During the Japanese Era won the second Wu Yung-fu Cultural Criticism Award. In addition, Hsieh also published A Journal of Unearthed Figures in Taiwan in the 1980s, describing Taiwan's predecessors such as Tan Teng-pho, poet Wang Baiyuan, musician Chiang Wen-yeh, etc.

In 2017, he was awarded the 37th National Cultural Award, and subsequently donated all the prize money to establish the Romain Rolland Million Novel Award.

== Life ==
Hsieh graduated from the National Taiwan Normal University's Department of Fine Arts. In 1964, Hsieh began to live in Paris, France, to study sculpture, and in 1968, he studied art theory and art history in New York City, United States.

=== Return to Taiwan (1988–present) ===
Hsieh Li-fa did not want the historical chapter of Taiwanese art to exist only in the corridors of art museums. After returning to China, in addition to continuing to engage in artistic creation, he also devoted himself to the field of literature. He wrote the history of Taiwan's art movement during the Japanese era, which was later extended to his first novel, Purple Dadaocheng, which was also Taiwan's first art novel. In 2016, this work was remade into a TV series of the same name.

Hsieh Li-fa's creations are in various forms, combined with curatorial concepts, and he has also dabbled in "land art". Take "Drifting Light Coordinates" in 2004 as an example. The materials used are driftwood and a reflector. The driftwood is cut into a bevel and a reflector is attached to the top. It can have various appearances as the light changes. Since Fubao's outlet is located at Below the aircraft flight path, this artistic creation is called a work that can be seen from an airplane.

In 2021, the Year of The Ox, The Juan I-jong Taiwan Story Museum and invited Mr. Hsieh Li-fa to exhibit ox paintings for a Year of the Ox exhibition. His work was paired with Juan I-jong's photography of cattle in Taiwan and the Beigang Cow Market as well as the "Five Cows Picture" painted by Han Huang.
