= Taiwan PEN =

Taiwanese literary organization

Taiwan PEN (臺灣筆會) is a Taiwanese literary organization founded on January 18, 1987. Its founding principles include ensuring creative freedom, promoting Taiwanese culture, and fostering international exchanges. The association is typically led by novelists or poets in rotation.

The association was founded in response to a proposal by writer Li Min-yung (李敏勇) at the annual meeting of the Taiwan Literature (臺灣文藝) on December 7, 1986. On January 18, 1987, a founding meeting was held to invite Taiwanese writers to sign up as founding members, and the association was officially established on February 25, 1987.

Since its founding, the Taiwan PEN has been committed to promoting Taiwanese literature. It publishes the organization's newsletter, Taiwan PEN Communication (臺灣筆會通訊), along with publications like PEN Monthly (筆會月報) and Taiwan PEN Columns (臺灣筆會專欄). The association organizes literary lectures, seminars, and workshops, and published columns in Independence Evening Post (自立晚報) and Taiwan Times (臺灣時報). It actively participates in social movements, collaborates with over twenty cultural organizations, advocates for the establishment of Taiwanese literature departments in universities, and played a role in the establishment of the National Museum of Taiwan Literature. The association annually selects the year's top 10 books and compiles the Annual Anthology of Taiwan Literature.

After the lifting of martial law in Taiwan, the Taiwan PEN established its first branch, the Saline Land Branch, consisting of writers in the region with a strong sense of local consciousness. The branch aimed to promote Taiwanese literature and continue the spirit of caring for the local community, following the footsteps of senior writers in the Saline Land such as Wu Hsin-jung (吳新榮), Kuo Shui-t'an (郭水潭), Lin Fang-nian (林芳年), and Wang Deng-shan (王登山), who were part of the Taiwan Alliance for Literature and Arts Jiali Branch during the Japanese rule period. However, this branch gradually declined and practically dissolved.
