= Kangxi Taiwan map =

Earliest colored map of Taiwan

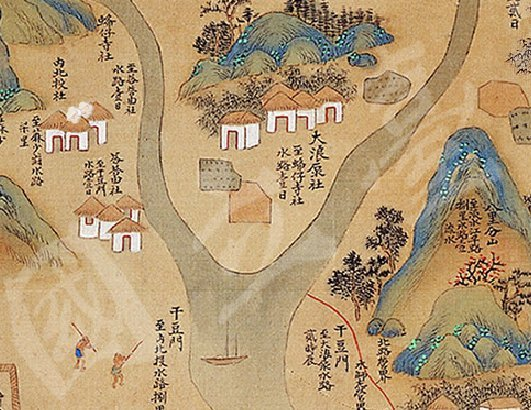
《康熙臺灣輿圖》中的淡水河與基隆河流域，上有大浪泵社與北投社等標記

The Kangxi Taiwan Map (康熙臺灣輿圖) was the extant single-scrolled, earliest colored map of Taiwan. The whole map was in silk texture with a horizontal length of 523 cm and vertical height of 64 cm. The original map was drawn between 1699~1704 (Kangxi 38-43 of Qing Dynasty), and it was the extant single earliest colored and scrolled map of Taiwan. The whole map depicted the early 18th century Taiwan’s landscape and humanity settlement scenery through a traditional Chinese landscape painting style. It was praised by Inō Kanori (伊能嘉矩) as “the best of Taiwan’s ancient maps” and was National Taiwan Museum’s most treasured collection. It was designated as a “national treasure” in 2010.

The Kangxi Taiwan Map is a horizontal long scroll painted by traditional Chinese landscape painting style. It took a bird’s eye view from above the Taiwan Strait and viewed Western Taiwan from west to east. The left side of the map indicated the north and the right side of the map indicated the south. Its content included a realistic depiction of terrains of mountains and rivers, administrative and military deployments, roads, urban and rural landscapes in Western Taiwan from north to south at the turn of the 17th and 18th centuries. It could be considered as a miniature of Taiwan’s contemporary social and cultural life, as well as early Qing Dynasty's understanding of Taiwan’s geographical knowledge, which showed aspects of a geographical map, military map, and customs map at the same time.

During Japanese occupation, the map was purchased by the Government-General of Taiwan from a certain Zheng family in Hsinchu in 1902 (Meiji 35), which became a collection of the Government-General of Taiwan Museum. After the 2nd Sino-Japanese War, the Government of the Republic of China took over Taiwan, and collections of the Government-General of Taiwan Museum were received by the National Taiwan Museum.

== Current version ==
The Kangxi Taiwan Map held in the National Taiwan Museum had actually more than one copy. The “original version” that was drawn during Qing Dynasty’s Kangxi era (also referred to as ver. A) was reportedly originally stored in Beijing's Imperial Palace, though it was later brought to Taiwan as a result of the Boxer Rebellion in 1900 and became part of National Taiwan Museum’s collection. Despite its designation as a national treasure, this version actually had a large missing area at the south of Kaohsiung on the map, which could not be fully restored even after repairs were made, and thus its circulation was limited. Versions that had broader circulation, however, were two copies that were created in the first half of the 20th century: The first copy (ver. B) and the second copy (ver. C). While these two had discrepancies in painting style and content when compared with the original version, they were better in clarity and completeness, while also preserving most of the imagery missing from the original version. As a result, over the years these two copies gradually replaced the original version as the main versions used and circulated by the museum.

=== Original version of the Kangxi Taiwan Map (ver. A) ===
The original version of the Kangxi Taiwan Map was a silk-based, huge long scroll map of Taiwan. According to research conducted by academic circles, it was created some time between Kangxi 38-43 (1699-1704). This map was reportedly stored in Beijing’s Imperial Palace, though it was later brought to Taiwan through tosses and turns after the outbreak of the Boxer Rebellion in 1900, where it was purchased by the Japanese Government-General of Taiwan and stored in the Government-General of Taiwan Museum (the predecessor of National Taiwan Museum) until this day. This work could be considered the most famous and representative ancient Taiwan map, which received wide attention ever since it became a collection. However, since it had been constantly on display from early times, its condition had gradually deteriorated over time, where the map’s silk layer had peeled off at multiple spots; the damage was especially severe in the region depicting south of Kaohsiung, an area that was almost unidentifiable on the map. Although the National Taiwan Museum entrusted the Japanese firm Usami Shokakudo (宇佐美松鶴堂) to conduct a professional maintenance on the map during 2004-2005, due to the severe peeling condition of the map’s silk layer, the damage area could not be restored to its original state and could only be filled in with blank supplemental silk that shared a similar background color of the map. Fortunately, the missing content of the Southern Taiwan region was fully preserved on the two early 20th century copies: the first copy (ver. B) and second copy (ver. C) of the Kangxi Taiwan Map.

=== First copy (ver. B) of the Kangxi Taiwan Map ===
The first copy of the Kangxi Taiwan Map was inferred to be a direct duplication made on the original Kangxi Taiwan Map by the Government-General of Taiwan Museum during the Japanese occupation era. This map had vivid colors, its graphic was complete and had clear information. Its preservation condition was better than the original version, thus it gradually replaced the original version as the choice for exhibition and circulation in the second half of the 20th century. This was the most common version of the Kangxi Taiwan Map as it was widely featured in public publications. Nevertheless, there were obvious discrepancies in painting style, coloring, and calligraphic style when compared with the original version, there were also partial mistakes and omissions regarding its textual information and graphic symbols, a certain number of these errors occurring even more frequently than the second copy (ver. C), which was also created in the same period.

=== Second copy (ver. C) of the Kangxi Taiwan Map ===
The second copy of the Kangxi Taiwan Map, like the first copy, was also inferred to be a direct duplication made on the original Kangxi Taiwan Map by the Government-General of Taiwan Museum during the Japanese occupation era. While it was called the “second copy,” it was not a copy of the first copy, but another independent copy of the original version. In fact, when compared with the first copy, the second copy was a more faithful reproduction of the original version in terms of textual information and graphic symbols. The painting quality of this version was slightly rougher than the first copy, so it took part in fewer public exhibitions and was seldomly provided for external circulation and usage. Though regarding the map content, it preserved, this version should be considered the more faithful reproduction.

=== Digital/Dream Reconstruction Version (ver. D) of the Kangxi Taiwan Map ===
The National Taiwan Museum formed a team with the Graduate Institute of Electro-Optical Engineering of National Taiwan University of Science and Technology during 2016-2017. Based on the digital image of the original version of the Kangxi Taiwan Map while also referring to ver. B and ver. C for graphic information, the team reconstructed the missing content of the original version through a digital approach to complete a digital reconstruction version of the Kangxi Taiwan Map. As a continuation of the alphabetical naming pattern used for earlier versions, while also taking the Digital/Dream English meaning into consideration, this version was referred to as ver. D. This version not only preserved the classical painting style and calligraphic style of the original version of the Kangxi Taiwan Map, made up for the mottled details and large missing areas, it also corrected more than a hundred occurrences of typos and variant characters that were present in ver. B and ver. C. These changes made this version a faithful-to-the-original, visually beautiful, and information-wise complete version of the Kangxi Taiwan Map.
