= Zhang Wenhuan =

- 張文環
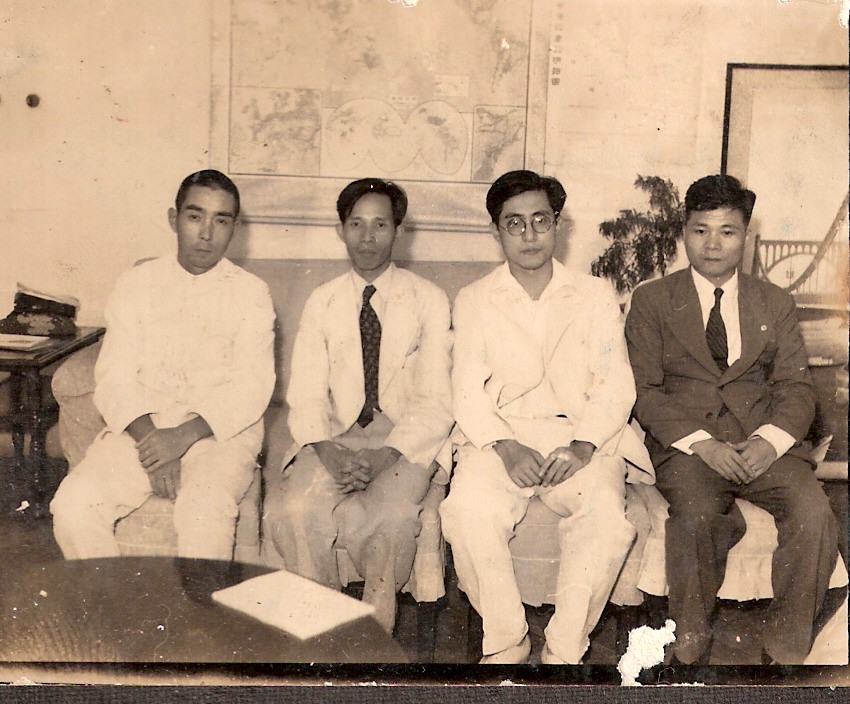
- Photo of Hamada Hayao, Lung Ying-tsung, Mitsuru Nishikawa, and Zhang Wenhuan (1942)
- Pronunciation: Tiunn Bûn-khuân

Zhang Wenhuan (Chinese：张文环, October 10, 1909 – February 12, 1978) was a novelist and magazine editor during the Japanese colonial period in Taiwan. He was born in Meishan Township, Chiayi County.

== Life ==
In 1927, he went to Okayama Junior High School in Japan and then entered the Faculty of Literature of Toyo University. After graduating in 1933, he organized the "Formosa (magazine)" with Wang Baiyuan, Wu Yongfu, and others, and published the pure literature magazine "Formosa". He also organized the "House Drama Research Society" with Wang Jingquan, Lin Tuan-chiu, Lu Ho-jo, and others. In 1941, he founded "Taiwan Literature" with Wang Jingquan, Zhongshan You and others. Zhang Wenhuan was enthusiastic about local politics before and after the war. In 1944, he served as the head of Taichung Zhouda Village. In 1946, he was elected as the first Taichung County Senator. In 1947, he served as the acting director of Nenggao District. After the 228 Incident, he became disappointed with politics.

Zhang Wenhuan's works are mostly based on Taiwanese customs, and his realistic style is heavy and simple. His representative work "Night Monkey" won The Kominhokokai Taiwan Literature Award. His novel "Castrated Chicken" was adapted into a stage play by playwright Lin Tuan-chiu and performed at Taipei Yongle Theater. His editing and creative energy made him quite influential in the local literary world during the war. After the war, he stopped writing due to the political atmosphere.

== Publication of the Works after the War ==
So far (2011/10/01), the known ones are:

Zhang Wenhuan/author, "Gundilo on the Ground", Tokyo Metropolitan Contemporary Culture Publishing House, 1975. The book also includes "Brother Zhang Wenhuan and I" and Zhang Wenhuan's work "Father's Face".

Zhang Wenhuan/author, Liao Qingxiu/translation, "Gundilo", Hongru Hall, 1991.

Zhang Henghao/editor, "Zhang Wenhuan Collection", Qianwei Publishing House, 1991.

Chen Wanyi, Liu Shuqin, Xu Weiyu/editor, "Zhang Wenhuan Complete Works Data Collection", Taichung County Cultural Center, April 1997~April 1998.

Zhang Wenhuan/translation, Ah Q's brother/author, Kawahara Isao/supervision, "Lovely Enemy", Tokyo Yumani Shobo, published in 2001 (Heisei 13).

Chen Wanyi/Editor, "Complete Collection of Zhang Wenhuan's Japanese Works and Drafts", Taichung County Cultural Center, 2001. 3 CDs: audio; 4 3/4 inches + 1 instruction manual.

Chen Wanyi/Editor, "Complete Works of Zhang Wenhuan", 8 volumes, Taichung County Cultural Center, 2002.

Zhang Wenhuan/Text, Chung Chao-cheng/Translation, Liu Bole/Illustration, "The Analects and Chicken", Yuanliu Publishing House, 2006.

Nakajima Toshiro, Shimomura Sakujiro, Kawahara Isao, et al./Editors, "Collection of Works of Taiwanese Writers in Taiwanese Literature during the Japanese Colonial Period", Volume 4, Volume 5, and Special Volume, Tokyo Metropolitan Green Shade Bookstore, 1999.

Nakajima Toshiro, Shimomura Sakujiro, Kawahara Isao/Editors, "Collection of Taiwanese Novels", Tokyo Metropolitan Green Shade Bookstore, 2002.

== See also ==
- Taiwan Art Research Association, Formosa
- Kosei Drama Research Society
