= Kun Ying Poetry Society =

Poetry society in Taiwan, founded 1912

The Kun Ying Poetry Society (Chinese: 鯤瀛詩社) is a traditional poetry society in the Tainan region of Taiwan. It was founded on the Mid-Autumn Festival in 1912, and its original name was Yu Chiang Recitation Society (嶼江吟社). It has undergone several name changes, and the current name was adopted in 1962.

The society has undergone several changes over the years. The original name was Yu Chiang Recitation Society, which was located in Peimen Isle (now Peimen District). It later moved to the area of present-day Chiangchun District, and the name was changed to Lu Hsi Recitation Society (蘆溪吟社) using the old name of Chiangchun. In 1921, former members Wang Ta-chun (王大俊) and Wu Hsuan-tsao (吳萱草) proposed to merge to form the White Seagull Poetry Society (白鷗詩社). The activities of this society expanded to cover the entire Peimen County. During the Second Sino-Japanese War, Chinese-language creation was censored by the Japanese colonial government, and the activities of the poetry society were suspended.

After World War II, Chen Chun-sheng (陳峻聲) and Chen Chang-yen (陳昌言) organized the Lang Huan Poetry Society (琅環詩社) in 1947 at the Chiali Hospital. It was renamed to Chiali Poetry Society in 1960, located at the Chin Tang Temple (金唐殿). The poetry society changed its name several times, and the organization also changed several times. The main area of activity was then the Peimen District of Tainan County, with Chiali Township as the center. In 1962, a poetry conference was held in the rear hall of the Chin Tang Temple, formally founding the Kun Ying Poetry Society and electing Wu Hsin-jung (吳新榮) as the first president.
