= Hsieh Nan-kuang =

Chinese politician

Hsieh Nan-kuang (Chinese: 謝南光; November 18, 1902 - July 26, 1969), formerly known as Xie Chunmu and pen name Zhui Feng, was a Taiwanese activist and politician. Born in Changhua, he was a famous social movement participant in Taiwan under Japanese rule and a well-known post-war Chinese political figure.

== Life ==
Xie Chunmu graduated from Taipei Normal School (now National Taipei University of Education) in 1921 and soon studied at Tokyo Higher Normal School (now Tsukuba University), Japan. He graduated in 1925 and transferred to higher education. While in school, Xie Chunmu participated in the second and third summer cultural lecture groups of the Taiwan Cultural Association. However, due to the Erlin Incident, he dropped out of school and returned to Taiwan to support the movement. Soon, he joined the Taiwanese People's Daily in Taipei to work. When the Taiwan People's Party was established in 1927, Hsieh Chun-mu served as a member of the Central Standing Committee, director of the Political Department, and chairman of the Labor and Peasants Committee. However, due to Hsieh Chun-mu's radical line that dominated the Taiwan People's Party, Japanese officials forcibly disbanded the Taiwan People's Party in 1931.

After the Taiwan People's Party was dissolved, Hsieh Chun-mu moved his family to mainland China in 1931 and founded the "Hualian News Agency." Xie Chunmu changed his name to Xie Nanguang in December 1933 and became the secretary of the Nanyang Overseas Chinese Federation. After the outbreak of the Sino-Japanese War, Xie Nanguang entered the Institute of International Studies in Chongqing and was responsible for collecting Japanese military intelligence. In September 1940, he became the Secretary-General. After that, Xie Nanguang served as a standing committee member of the Taiwan Revolutionary Alliance and became the chairman in November 1943. After the Second World War ended, Xie Nanguang served as a member of the Chinese delegation in Japan and as deputy leader of the political and economic group. He stayed in Tokyo, Japan. In 1950, Xie Nanguang resigned, served as the chairman of the Tiande Trading Association, and was elected the chairman of the China-Japan Trade Association. A director of the China Friendship Association, he went to Beijing in 1952 to participate in the Chinese People's Political Consultative Conference as a "special entertainer." He returned to serve as a representative of the National People's Congress of China and a member of the Standing Committee. He died of illness in Beijing on July 26, 1969.

=== Before going to China ===
When he was about to graduate, Wang Baiyuan took a cross-dressing photo with several Taipei Normal University classmates. Wang Baiyuan dressed up as a woman in a suit, one classmate dressed up as Chaplin, and another as a fortune teller; as for Xie Chunmu and other classmates, they "wore a pair of Taiwanese clothes, holding a bicycle in both hands, doing As he was about to set off, there was a sign on the back of the car that read "Promote Taiwan's Culture." A classmate was in front of him pretending to be Japanese and standing there refusing to let him go. The same was true for the front of the car. A sign was hung that read, "No, just wait a little longer!" "The words".

When Xie Chunmu was studying at Taipei Normal School, he often read "Taiwan Youth" (the official journal of the New People's Association), which schools in Taiwan banned then. He was a sympathetic supporter of the magazine and an active member of the secret circulation of this publication in the school. In 1921, Xie Chunmu graduated from Taipei Normal University with first-place honors and accepted a scholarship from the Government-General's Bureau of Culture and Education to study at Tokyo Normal University. However, after he came to Japan, he became a critic of Japanese colonial rule. In 1922, Xie Chunmu published a short story "Where Will She Go? To Troubled Young Sisters" in "Taiwan" under the pen name "Zhui Feng." Scholars later regarded this work as one of the most critical chapters in the history of Taiwanese literature. It is a significant work of vernacular fiction. After that, Xie Chunmu successively published his comments on Taiwan's colonial authorities' education, law, agricultural and industrial movements, and other issues in publications such as "Taiwan," "Taiwan People's Daily," and "Taiwan Xinmin Daily."

During Hsieh's stay in Japan, he actively participated in various overseas activities of the Taiwanese Cultural Association, as well as studying and writing. He also participated in the Cultural Association's Summer Cultural Lecture Group for International Students in Tokyo. He returned to Taiwan for promotion in the three years from 1923 to 1925. According to research by Taiwanese literature and history scholar He Yilin, the titles and contents of Xie Chunmu's first two speeches back home include: "Generalization of Education," Scientific Attitude and Daily Life," Characteristics of Modern Education," Personalization of Education" and socialization" etc. Later, Xie Chunmu served as a secretary of the Tokyo Youth Association and Petition Movement for establishing a Taiwanese Parliament.

During his stay in Japan, Xie Chunmu slept and ate together with Wang Baiyuan. The two often talked about the fate of Taiwanese people upstairs in their apartment until dawn. In 1931, Wang Baiyuan published the Japanese poetry collection "The Way of Thorns" (Chinese translation as "The Way of Thorns"). Xie Chunmu wrote a remarkable preface for Wang Baiyuan, explaining his friendship with Wang Baiyuan, Wang Baiyuan's ideological changes, and revealing his love for Japan. Dissatisfaction with assimilation policies and educational methods. This preface by Xie Chunmu was affirmed by Wang Baiyuan and was translated into Chinese by Wang Baiyuan many years later.

The "Erlin Incident" broke out in October 1925. This peasant movement gave Xie Chunmu a considerable shock because the location of the conflict between police and civilians on October 22 happened to be in the sugar cane field of Xie Chunmu's relatives, and many of those arrested were his Relatives and friends (for example friend Li Yingzhang). Xie Chunmu gave up his studies to support the peasant movement and returned to Taiwan to join the rescue team. After returning to Taiwan, Xie Chunmu worked in the Taipei branch of the Taiwan People's Daily, actively participated in the booming agricultural and industrial movement at that time, and participated in the activities of the Taiwan Cultural Association. In July 1927, Chiang Weishui established the Taiwan People's Party, with Hsieh Chun-mu serving as its first secretary-general. In August 1930, he and Huang Baichengzhi jointly served as editors of "Flood". His political stance gradually shifted to the left, and he paid attention to the survival rights of Taiwan's peasants and workers. This was related to his concern for cultural enlightenment, educational reform, and the petition movement to establish Taiwan's parliament when he was studying abroad. Different.

Because Xie Chunmu was actively engaged in politics and the agricultural and industrial movement from when he returned to Taiwan to his move to Shanghai in December 1931, Xie Chunmu became a target of surveillance by the Japanese special police. This was also true from when he moved to China to the end of the Sino-Japanese War.

=== After going to China ===
"Don't Forget the Dream of Falling Flowers in Taiwan" by Zhang Xiuzhe, twenty-nine, goes: After the Sino-Japanese Incident in 128, Japan's military power expanded and spread to the Shanghai Concession. Xie Junnai felt the danger around him because the Hualian News Agency's style was mainly anti-Japanese. The Japanese quickly criticized his views, so he decided to flee to Shanghai to avoid being captured and sacrificed by the Japanese. Rumors spread that Xie Jun was killed or killed in Fujian... Xie Jun ran around but later went to Xiamen and ran away again. He went to Hong Kong, did some particular work, and later transferred to Chongqing, but he was a brave Taiwanese compatriot. ...is also an outstanding talent in Taiwan.

After the outbreak of the Anti-Japanese War, Xie Chunmu served as the Secretary-General of the Institute of International Studies of the China Institute of International Studies. It is said that the elusive character "Yangtze No. 1" in the Taiwanese TV series "Yangtze River Storm" is his code name at the "Institute of International Studies."

Xie Chunmu once told Lan Min, a Taiwanese female student who went to Chongqing: "If China wins in the future, it will not be the world of the Kuomintang, but the world of the Communist Party." He also hoped that she would go to Yan'an.

== Written works ==
Literary works written in Chinese and Japanese:

- Japanese novel "Where Will She Go—To the Troubled Young Sister" written by Xie Chunmu from May 21 to 23, 1922. The work was serialized in "Taiwan Youth" and was first published in the 5th issue of July 1922.
- New Japanese poems "Imitation of Poetry: Praise for the King of Bo," "Imitation of Poetry: Ode to Coal," "Imitation of Poetry: Love Will Thrive," and "Imitation of Poetry: Before the Flowers Bloom" Were written in May 1923 and published In April 1924, the fifth-year issue of "Taiwan" was published, which was delayed by eight months. The four poems mentioned above were initially written in Japanese and were later translated into Chinese by Taiwanese poet Chen Qianwu. Now, people can read the Chinese translations of these four poems through "Selected Poems Translated by Chen Qianwu," edited by Chen Mingtai. Xie Chunmu wrote four "Imitation of Poems" under the pseudonym "Zhui Feng." The Chinese translations of two of them - "Praise to the King of Tibet" and "Ode to Burning Charcoal" - were included in the National Anthology edited by Lin Ruiming. ‧Modern Poetry Volume I".
- Chinese novel "Ignorance's 'Mysterious Homemade Island'" (1923) (an essential work of Taiwan's early New Literature Movement)

Other works were written in Chinese and Japanese:

- "Taiwanese People's Requirements" (published in 1929): The Japanese title is "Taiwanese People's Requirements: The Development Process of the People's Party." Taiwan Xinmin Newspaper published the book in 1931 (Showa 6).
- "Taiwanese People View This Way" (published in 1931): The Japanese title is "Taiwanese People View This Way". The Taiwan People's Newspaper Company published this book in 1930 (Showa 5). It is also the most precious record in the history of Taiwan's national movement—one of the documents.
- "The Decline of Japaneseism" (published in 1933): Published by Chongqing National Books Publishing House.
- "The Truth about Japan after the Defeat" (page archive backup, stored in the Internet Archive) (published in 1935): by the People's Press Press of Taiwan (Republic of China).

Publications selected by posterity:

- In 1974, Tokyo Longxi Bookstore reprinted and published three books by Xie Chunmu: "This is How Taiwanese See It," "Taiwanese People's Demands," and "The Decline of Japanese."
- Guo Pingping/editor, "Selected Works of Xie Nanguang" (Part 1) (Part 2), Taipei: Straits Publishing House, 1999.

== Public image ==
The police investigation unit of the Government-General of Taiwan classified Xie Chunmu as a "national movement rightist," while the Security Section of the Police Security Bureau of the Ministry of Internal Affairs of Japan, the Shanghai Consulate, and other units listed Xie Chunmu as a "Special A" surveillance target.

Japanese scholar Wakabayashi Shojo, who studies the political movement in Taiwan, believes that before going to China, Xie Chunmu's Socialism ideology was "a slightly socialist tendency among the moderates" between the "moderates" represented by Lin Xiantang, Cai Peihuo, and others. Among the "radicals" were Jiang Weishui, Lian Wenqing, and others.

Regarding Xie Chunmu's political and cultural discussion, Taiwanese scholar Liu Shuqin commented that "Taiwanese People View This Way" and "Taiwanese People's Requirements" written before Xie Chunmu left Taiwan and went to China, "the two books can be said to be "her The 1930s version of "Where Are We Going?" can also be said to be another "The Way of Thorns" in the form of a political commentary that colonial youths were trying to identify with. However, in the 1930s, Xie Chunmu gave up metaphors and shed his literary cloak, looking directly at Taiwan's future with current trends."

Later generations' evaluation of Xie Chunmu's literary works:

- Poet Chen Qianwu hailed his "Imitation of Poetry" series as "the prototype of Taiwan's new poetry."
- Scholar Chen Fangming regards Xie Chunmu's novels as the origin of Taiwan's left wing.

== See also ==
- Friend: Wang Baiyuan.
- He has served or participated in Taiwanese groups, such as Taiwan People's Daily, Taiwan Cultural Association, Taiwan People's Party, and other organizations.
- Chinese organizations that he has served or participated in Hualian News Agency, Nanyang Overseas Chinese Federation, Taiwan Revolutionary Alliance, Tiande Trading Association, China-Japan Friendship Association, Chinese People's Political Consultative Conference, National People's Congress, and other institutions.
