= Ushinosuke Mori =

Japanese anthropologist and folklorist

- Born: January 16, 1877; Kyoto, Japan
- Died: July 4, 1926 (aged 49)
- Occupations: Anthropologist, folklorist

Ushinosuke Mori (森丑之助, January 16, 1877–July 4, 1926), who often published articles under pen names Mori Heiushi (森丙牛) and Mori (森), was a Japanese naturalist born in Gojo Muromachi (五條室町), Kyoto. A drop out of Nagasaki Commercial School (長崎商業學校), he went to Taiwan as an army interpreter and began to conduct research, until he ended up missing on board a steamship in 1926. The scope of his research not only included anthropological investigations on Taiwan aborigines, folklore objects and archaeology, but also involved the collection and research of plants, making him a Taiwan naturalist during the early Japanese occupation period. Due to his love and contributions to Taiwan aboriginal studies, he was praised as the “Leading researcher of Taiwan aborigines (臺灣蕃界調查第一人).” The specimens he collected were mostly preserved in the National Taiwan Museum.

== Life ==
Mori Ushinosuke studied at the Nagasaki Commercial School (長崎商業学校, now Nagasaki City Nagasaki Commercial High School 長崎市立長崎商業高等学校) at a young age. He dropped out and ran away from home when he was 16, and began a wandering life.

In May 1895, he went to Taiwan as an army interpreter to conduct field study on Taiwan aborigines. He traveled around Taiwan Island and visited local tribes, collecting a copious amount of data in the fields of anthropology, history, folklore, archaeology, botany and geography in the process and compiled books from the data. He gained titles such as “Taiwan Aboriginal Know-it-all (台灣蕃通)” and “Grand Chief of Taiwan Aboriginal Tribes (台灣蕃社總頭目).”

In 1900, when Mori conducted an anthropological survey with Torii Ryūzō (鳥居龍藏), he decided to hike the Niitakayama (新高山, now Yü Shan 玉山). After enduring two days of food shortage crisis, his party crossed the Tataka Saddle (塔塔加鞍部), passed the Front Peak (前峰) and West Peak (西峰), and finally reached the summit of the Main Peak (主峰).

On May 17, 1915, after the Bunun chief Lahu Ali (拉荷·阿雷) initiated the Dafun Incident (大分事件), Mori advocated for a non-suppressive approach on administering aboriginal affairs and the bestowment of autonomy to aborigines.

In July 1925, he boarded the steamship Kasadomaru (笠戶丸), which was sailing on the Inner Taiwan route. While en route, he disappeared on June 4. The authorities ruled that he committed suicide by jumping into the sea.

== Contribution and Appraisal ==
Mori made significant contributions to the anthropology of Taiwan and research on indigenous peoples. In his article “On the Investigation of Taiwan’s Aboriginal Tribes,” he outlined six main areas of his field investigation:

1. Physical Anthropometric Survey: Utilizing physical anthropometric charts and portrait photography to understand different indigenous groups. Mori’s measurement charts were provided by Shōgorō Tsuboi (坪井正五郎), a professor at Tokyo Imperial University and one of the founders of the Anthropological Society of Tokyo. Tsuboi had studied in England between 1889 and 1892 and was also the mentor of Torii Ryūzō (鳥居龍藏).
2. Exploration of Archaeological Remains: Conducting excavation records of prehistoric sites belonging from the Stone Age and being the first to photograph Taiwan’s megalithic culture. In his 1911 article “On the Stone Age Sites in Taiwan” (Parts 1-3) published in the Taiwan Times (Japanese colonial period), Mori documented 169 Stone Age sites, laying the foundation for archaeological anthropology in Taiwan.
3. Collection and Comparative Study of Myths and Legends: Published in various journals and periodicals such as the Journal of the Anthropological Society of Tokyo, the Taiwan Times, and the Oriental Times, as well as in volumes one and two of his monograph Taiwan Aboriginal Chronicles.
4. Linguistic Collection: Published works include Paiwan Language Collection, Amis Language Collection, and Bunun Language Collection, among others.
5. Collection of Ancient and Folk Songs.
6. Collection and Study of Ethnographic Data: Mori’s collected and analyzed data covered topics such as the social organization of different tribes, burial practices, punishments, economic activities and cultural observations between indigenous tribes and the Japanese government and trading companies. These findings are scattered across various articles and periodicals.

Additionally, between 1900 and 1901, Mori studied botany and specimen collection methods under Konishi Narishige. From 1906 to 1909, while serving as a commissioned researcher in the Useful Plants Survey Division, he assisted in the extensive collection of alpine plant specimens. At least 20 plant species bear the Chinese name “森氏 "(Mori)" or the Latin term "morii", such as Cyclobalanopsis morii (Mori Oak), Angelica morii Hayata (Mori Angelica), Dendranthema morii (Mori Chrysanthemum), Cirsium morii (Mori Thistle), Rubus morii Hayata (Coarse-haired Raspberry) and Polystichun morii Hayata (Yushan Shield Fern).

Mori also contributed to significant discoveries in the study of Taiwan’s geography. In November 1908, with the assistance of indigenous guides from eight different tribes, an expedition team was formed, including Noro Nagayoshi (野呂寧), Chief Engineer of the Office of Aboriginal Affairs; Shida Umetaro (志田梅太郎), a survey contractor; and Mori, as an Aboriginal Affairs contractor. This “Southern Central Mountain Range Expedition Survey Team” conducted explorations and mapping to determine the location of the Niitaka Mountain Range (玉山|山脉). They ultimately confirmed that the Niitaka (Yushan) Mountain Range was not a subsidiary branch of the Central Mountain Range, but rather an independent mountain range.

In terms of recognition, Miyamoto Nobuhito (宮本延人) praised him as the “leading researcher of early Taiwanese aboriginal studies;” Torii Ryūzō praised him as the “leading researcher of Taiwan aborigines.”

== Work collections and publications ==
Published works:

- Ushinosuke, Mori. 1909. The Collection of Paiwan Aboriginal Language. (ぱいわん蕃語集) Published by The Aboriginal Affairs Section of the Police Department, Civil Affairs Bureau, Taiwan Sōtokufu. Archived in National Taiwan University Library, Inō collection(伊能文庫).
- Ushinosuke, Mori. 1909. The Collection of Amis Aboriginal Language. (阿眉蕃語集：アミス族) Published by The Aboriginal Affairs Section of the Police Department, Civil Affairs Bureau, Taiwan Sōtokufu. Archived in National Taiwan University Library, Inō collection.
- Ushinosuke, Mori. 1910. The Collection of Bunun Aboriginal Language. (ぶぬん蕃語集) Published by The Aboriginal Affairs Office, Taiwan Sōtokufu. Archived in National Taiwan University Library, Inō collection.
- U. Mori & S. Nakai. 1913. Landscape of Taiwan Mountains. (臺灣山岳景觀) Taihoku: Shinkodo. Online archived in National Museum of Taiwan History.
- Ushinosuke, Mori. 1915. Atlas of Taiwan Aboriginals, volume I. (臺灣蕃族圖譜I) Taihoku: Temporary Taiwan Old Customs Investigation Committee. Online archived in National Museum of Taiwan History.
- Ushinosuke, Mori. 1915. Atlas of Taiwan Aboriginals, volume II. (臺灣蕃族圖譜II) Taihoku: Temporary Taiwan Old Customs Investigation Committee. Online archived in National Museum of Taiwan History.
- Ushinosuke, Mori. 1917. Taiwan Aboriginal Chronicles. (臺灣蕃族志) Taihoku: Temporary Taiwan Old Customs Investigation Committee. Archived in National Taiwan University Library, Inō collection.

Unpublished works:

- Ushinosuke, Mori. 1910. Adventure Report on Crossing the Central Mountain Range between Jiji and Bazaizhuang. (集集．拔仔庄間中央山脈橫斷探險報文)
- Ushinosuke, Mori. 1910. The Collection of Taroko Aboriginal Language. (大魯閣蕃語集)
- Ushinosuke, Mori. 1910. The Collection of Taroko Aboriginal Language in Puli Society. (埔里社方面トルコ蕃語集)

Published articles (newspaper, journals, magazines):

- Journal of the Anthropological Society of Tokyo (24 articles)
- Taiwan Nichinichi Shinpō (18 articles)
- Taiwan Times (Japanese colonial period, 34 articles)
- Industrial Taiwan (7 articles)
- Oriental Review (6 articles)
- Taiwan Agricultural Report (4 articles)
- Bulletin of the Taiwan Natural History Society (3 articles)
- The Aboriginal Territories (3 articles)
- Taiwan Education (2 articles)
- Patriotic Women (1 article)
- Japanese Encyclopedia (1 article)
- Outline of Aboriginal Policy (1 article)
- New Taiwan (1 article)

== Related studies ==
- Yang, Nanjun; Miyaoka, Maoko; Miyazaki, Seiko; etc., The Phantom Anthropologist: Mori Ushinosuke: A Lifetime Dedicated to Studying Taiwan Aborigines (《幻の人類學者:森丑之助:台灣原住民の研究に捧げた生涯》), Tokyo: Fukyosha, 2005.
- National Taiwan Museum’s permanent exhibition Discovering Taiwan: Revisit the Age of Taiwan’s Natural History and Naturalists (〈發現臺灣：重訪臺灣博物學與博物學家的年代〉) and its dedicated exhibition book: The exhibition brought up discussions on the early 20th century, a period where the Government-General of Taiwan Library was first established and called the “Age of Discovery” because the study of Taiwan’s natural history and naturalists flourished. The discussions were meant to reexamine the discoveries, discoverers and the tradition of discovery of natural history that served as the foundation of National Taiwan Museum’s collection and shaped the museum’s style. Mori Ushinosuke’s story and specimen collection were displayed in the first unit "Way to Discovery", outlining how naturalists of that generation emphasized personal on-site surveying, which referred to as the so-called “knowledge is gained alongside people’s journeys” investigation tradition.
- The character "Hayashi Mokunosuke" (林木之助) in the manga The Name of the Moon (月亮的名字), published in 2023, is based on Mori.

== Related entries ==
- 伊能嘉矩、金關丈夫、鳥居龍藏、鹿野忠雄、宮本延人、移川子之藏、馬淵東一、國分直一、淺井惠倫、千千岩助太郎
