= Torii Ryūzō =

Japanese anthropologist, ethnologist, archaeologist, and folklorist (1870–1953)

Ryuzo Torii
- 鳥居 龍藏
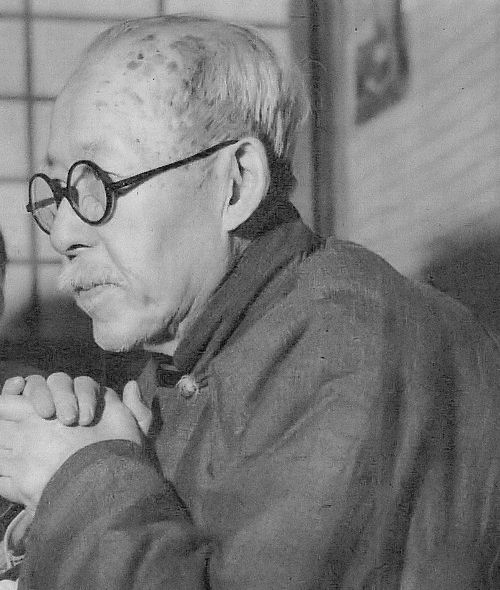
- Torii in 1952
- Born: March 4, 1870; Tokushima, Shikoku, Japan
- Died: January 14, 1953 (aged 82)
- Occupation(s): anthropologist, ethnologist, archaeologist and folklorist

Ryuzo Torii (鳥居 龍藏; May 4, 1870 – January 14, 1953) was a Japanese anthropologist, ethnologist, archaeologist, and folklorist. Torii traveled across East Asia and South America for his research. He is known for his anthropological research in China, Taiwan, Korea, Russia, Europe, and other countries.

Described by Terry Bennett as "a pioneer in the use of the camera in anthropological fieldwork," Torii is believed to have inspired researchers, including Ushinosuke Mori, to make use of photography in their research. Torii first made use of a camera while conducting fieldwork in North-East China in 1895.

Later, in the 1900s, Torii was assisted in his research by Mori, who acted as his interpreter.

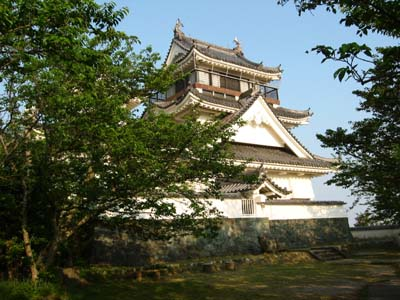
Torii's Memorial Museum established by Tokushima Prefecture (徳島県立鳥居記念博物館).

== Early life ==
Torii was born into a merchant family on the island of Shikoku, in the Tokushima quarter of Higashi Senba-chō (東船場町). Torii received formal education through second grade, and left school at age seven. From an early age, he was a passionate collector of artifacts of all kinds, though he showed little interest in schoolwork. He eventually left school, until a teacher (Tominaga Ikutarō:富永幾太郎) convinced him to complete his schooling. One of his hobbies was local history, and he pursued research in his home region.

He began writing articles on anthropological topics as a teenager. These came to the attention and appreciation of Tokyo Imperial University (TIU) professor of anthropology Tsuboi Shōgorō (坪井正五郎). Shōgorō took an interest in him, and went to Tokushima to advise Torii to study anthropology. Acting on Shōgorō's advice, Torii moved to Tokyo at age 20. Once there, Shōgorō hired Torii as a specimen classifier in the anthropology research institute of the university in 1893.

== Career ==
His early reputation came from his research on the native Ainu people of the Kuril Islands.

Torii used eight different languages in his studies, including the Ainu language. His article "Ainu people in Chishima Island", written in French, is a landmark in Ainu studies.

Torii spent most of his life in field-work (research). He insisted, "Studies should not be done only in the study room. Anthropology is in the fields and mountains." He believed that anthropological theories should be backed by empirical evidence.

Torii began to use sound recording for anthropology research in domestic research at Okinawa Prefecture.

Though Torii is famous for research performed outside of Japan, his research began in Japan where he studied many places, including his hometown, Hokkaido, and Okinawa. During his time at TIU, he studied Japan, on the invitation of various prefectures, villages, streets, etc. After completing his research in an area, he held an exhibition, lecturing, and revealed discoveries. The Torii style is research, exhibit, and lecture. In 1898 he became an assistant at TIU.

In 1895, TIU sent Torii to Northeast China to the Liaodong Peninsula, his first overseas posting. In 1896, the university sent Torii to Taiwan.

In 1899 he worked in Hokkaido and Chishima Islands, studying the Ainu people, yielding a 1903 book Chishima Ainu, on the Kuril Ainu.

In 1900, he completed the first ascent of Taiwan's Mount Niitaka.

In 1905, he became a TIU lecturer.

In 1906, he was engaged by the Karachin Royal Family of Mongolia. Kimiko worked as a teacher at Karachin Girl-School. Torii became a professor at Karachin Boy-School.

In 1911, Torii conducted fieldwork in Korea. At the time Sada Sekino described an ancient tomb as a Goguryeo artifact. Torii pointed out that it instead belonged to Han dynasty. This cost him friends since Sekino was a powerful figure at TIU. Torii proved that the Han Chinese had arrived in Korea at an early period.

In 1921 Torii earned a Ph.D. in anthropology from TIU.

In 1922 Torii became an assistant professor at TIU.

In 1924 Torii left TIU and established Ryuzo Torii Institute, staffed by his family members.

In 1928 Torii worked on establishing Sophia University in Tokyo. It was the only foreign school there for many years. As a Catholic anthropologist, Torii did all procedures for Ryuzo Torii and succeeded in lifting it to a university level.

In 1937 he traveled to Brazil and excavated the sambaqui archeological site Morro do Bernardes, Jupuvura, municipality of Iguape, São Paulo - with support from Museu Paulista and botanist Frederico Lange de Morretes.

In 1939 he joined the Harvard–Yenching Institute, the top Institute for Asian studies in the US at the time as an "Invited Professor". A sister university of Harvard was named Yenching University in Peking, China, and was an American missionary school. The Japanese Army could not come into this university until the Pearl Harbor attack. Torii was sent to the American area in China by the institute during the Second Sino-Japanese War, where his China anthropology studies reside.

== Recognition ==
In 1920, Torii was honored for an Ordre des Palmes Académiques of France. The award disappeared within the university.

In 1964 the "Torii Memorial Museum" was established by Tokushima prefecture, in the Naruto area. It is in a Japanese traditional castle on the top of Myoken Mountain. Funds came from local people, showing their memory and love for Ryuzo Torii. In 2010 the Museum moved to Tokushima city in the Forest of Culture area.

== Personal life ==
In 1901, he married Kimiko, daughter of a samurai in Tokushima. She was talented in music, language, and education.

In the wake of Yoshino Sakuzō's criticism of Japan's imperial ambitions in Korea, Torii aligned himself with those who justified Japanese annexation on the grounds that the contemporary consensus worldwide in linguistics, anthropology and archaeology were that the Korean and Japanese people were the same race/people (dōminzoku). (Note: Japanese original, Tan'itsu minzoku shinwa no kigen, Shin'yōsha, Tokyo 1995 pp.153ff.)

== See also ==
- Inō Kanori

== Sources ==
- Oguma, Eiji (2002). A Genealogy of Japanese Self-images. Trans Pacific Press. ISBN 978-1-876-84304-5.
- Siddle, Richard (1997). "The Ainu and the Discourse of 'Race'". In Dikötter, Frank (ed.). The Construction of Racial Identities in China and Japan: Historical and Contemporary Perspectives. C. Hurst & Co. ISBN 978-1-850-65287-8.
