= Inō Kanori =

Japanese academic

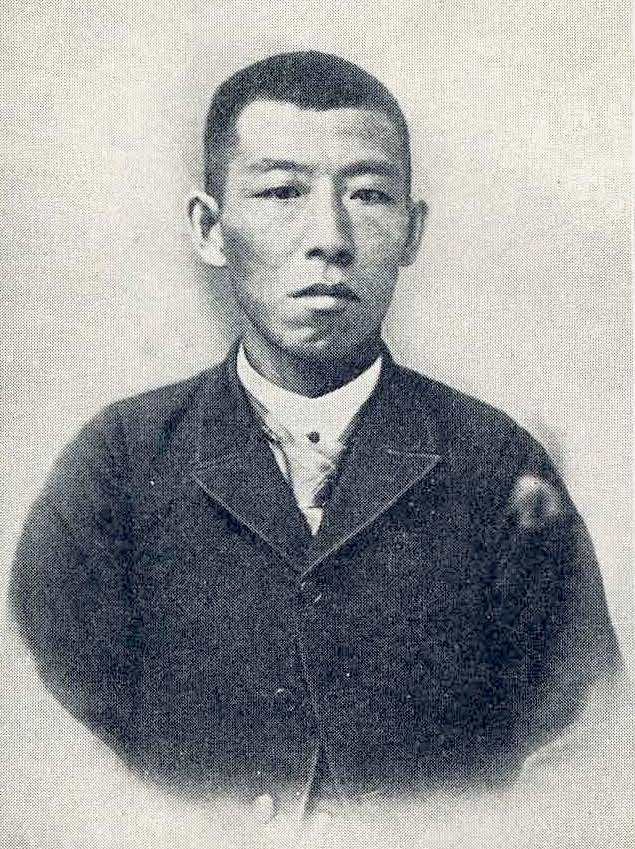
- Born: June 11, 1863; Japan; Iwate, Tōno
- Died: September 30, 1925 (aged 62)
- Occupation: Anthropologist

Inō Kanori (伊能 嘉矩; 11 June 1867 – 30 September 1925) was a Japanese anthropologist and folklorist known for his studies in Taiwanese indigenous peoples. Inō was the first person who classified the aboriginal tribes into several groups, instead of the traditional classification, dating back to the period of Qing rule and earlier, which imprecisely recognized these aborigines only as "cooked/domesticated" (熟蕃, jukuban) or "raw/wild" (生蕃, seiban).

== Biography ==
Inō was born in Shinyashiki (新屋敷), Yokota Village (橫田村), Tono City (遠野市), what is now part of the city of Tōno, Iwate, Japan. He moved to Tokyo in 1885 and was active in the Freedom and People's Rights Movement. He later worked as a journalist and for a printing company before becoming a pupil of the noted professor of biological anthropology, Tsuboi Shogoro, at Tokyo Imperial University in 1893, along with Torii Ryūzō. Following the acquisition of Taiwan by the Empire of Japan following the First Sino-Japanese War in 1895, he received permission from the Governor-General of Taiwan to conduct research there. Upon his arrival in Taiwan in November 1895, Inō joined the Governor-General's Office in Taipei to catalog material on indigenous people collected during the Qing administration. Inō began field research the following year. He remained in Taiwan to 1906, publishing several works on the culture of the Taiwanese aborigines.

In The Island of Formosa (1903), former US Consul to Formosa James W. Davidson presented the first English-language account of the aborigines of the whole island, which was almost entirely based on the comprehensive work collected over several years of study by Ino, the foremost authority on the topic at the time. In his book, Davidson presented Ino's formalization of eight tribes of Taiwanese aborigines: Atayal, Vonum, Tsou, Tsalisen, Paiwan, Puyuma, Ami and Pepo.

Inō returned to his native Tōno in 1905 and pursued cultural and folklore studies there, together with Kizen Sasaki. He became acquainted with Kunio Yanagita, who was also collecting oral traditions and tales in preparation of his Tōno Monogatari. He died in 1925, due to complication from malaria contracted while he was living in Taiwan.

== Contributions to Taiwan’s historiography ==
Since Inō Kanori conducted the "survey on the preparation of educational facilities for aborigines," he had published several important and general articles on knowledge of Taiwan’s aborigines. In 1900, when Taiwan Customs Study Group (臺灣慣習研究會) was founded, Inō Kanori often published articles relating to old customs and folklore of Han Taiwanese on Articles on Taiwan Customs (《臺灣慣習記事》), marking his entrance into the realm of history from anthropology. In 1902, he published his first major work since he arrived in Taiwan: Chronicles of Taiwan (《臺灣志》). In 1908, he participated in the editorial work of Preface to the Greater Japan Dictionary of Geographical Names-Chapter of Taiwan. In 1922, when the Government-General established the Government-General of Taiwan Historical Materials Editorial Committee, Inō Kanori was hired as a committee member and compiled articles. When he died in 1925, he left a posthumous manuscript of The Complete History of Taiwan (《臺灣全史》) with as many as 54 volumes, which was published as Chronicles of Taiwan Culture (《臺灣文化志》) in 1928, and the renowned Japanese intellectual Ozaki Hotsuma who was in Taiwan praised Inō as "the authority of Taiwan’s historiography.” In the same year, most of Inō Kanori’s Taiwanese ethological specimens became part of Taihoku Imperial University's (臺北帝國大學, nowadays National Taiwan University) collection in the specimen room, while his books and manuscripts entered the university library, and was collectively named Inō Bunko (伊能文庫, “Ino’s book collection”).

In 1941, famous Taiwanese scholar Yang Yun-pin (楊雲萍), who dedicated herself to the study of Taiwan’s history, appraised Inō as “the master of Taiwan studies” and “the immortal pyramid in the history of Taiwan studies.” In 1997, sorting of the Inō Bunko, which had stayed in National Taiwan University’s library for a long time, was finally complete, bringing Inō's achievements in Taiwan’s historiography to an even higher peak. His works were considered important references of Taiwan studies, and among the cultural and historical knowledge they offered, the Pepo survey record Chronicles of Politics of Taiwan Aborigines and Chronicles of Taiwan Culture were considered the most important.

== Bibliography ==
- Kanori Ino (2012). 平埔族調查旅行: 伊能嘉矩<台灣通信>選集 [Research trips among the Plains Aborigines: Selections from Inō Kanori's Taiwan diaries] (in Chinese). Translated by Yang Nanjun [in Chinese]. Taipei: Yuan-Liou. ISBN 9789573268932.

== See also ==
- Torii Ryūzō
