= Yeh Ti =

Taiwanese poet and translator (1931–2006)

Yeh Ti (Chinese: 葉笛; September 21, 1931 – May 9, 2006), originally named Yeh Chi-min (葉寄民), was a Taiwanese poet, translator, critic, and educator, hailing from Wanli in Tainan. He published poetry collections such as Purple Songs (紫色的歌) and Fire and Sea (火和海), a collection of essays titled Ukiyo-e (浮世繪), critical works like A Literary Tour of Taiwanese Literature (臺灣文學巡禮), and Essays on Early Modern Taiwanese Poets (臺灣早期現代詩人論), and translated more than ten works.

== Works ==
A pioneer in the early days of Taiwan's modern poetry scene, Yeh Ti began publishing new poetry in renowned magazines like Half-Moon Literary Arts (半月文藝) and Wild Wind (野風) in 1951. His primary creative period spanned from 1951 to 1958. After studying in Japan until 1969, he ceased composing poetry but continued to translate various foreign literary trends and works. Yeh's research extended to the development and comparison of modern poetry in Japan and China. During his time in Japan, he translated works by contemporary Japanese literary figures like Ryūnosuke Akutagawa, contributing to the foundation of translating Japanese works into Chinese in Taiwan.

Yeh Ti received various awards, including the Special Contribution Award in Literature from the 2nd Tainan Cultural Awards and the Wu Yong-fu Literary Criticism Award. His creative works mainly consisted of poetry and essays. In 1954, he published the poetry collection Purple Songs (紫色的歌). Upon returning to Taiwan in 1993, he settled down and completed the full translation of works by Japanese writers from the colonial era. His translated and critical work, Essays on Early Modern Taiwanese Poets (臺灣早期現代詩人論), published in 2003, serves as a pivotal piece that addresses a longstanding gap in the history of Taiwanese literature. His collected works and translations were compiled into the 18-volume Complete Works of Yeh Ti (葉笛全集) and published in 2007 by the National Museum of Taiwan Literature.
