= Lin Tuan-chiu =

Lin Tuan-chiu (Chinese: 林摶秋; October 6, 1920 - April 4, 1998) was a playwright, theater director, film producer, and film director from Taoyuan, Taiwan. During the Japanese rule and the early post-war years, he concentrated mainly on writing and directing plays, earning praise from the Tokyo Shimbun (東京新聞) as "Taiwan's first native playwright". After the war, he devoted himself to the film industry, founding the Yufeng Film Company and the Hushan Film Studio. The plays he wrote include The Tribe in the Deep Mountains (奧山の社), Castrated Chicken (閹雞), Takasago Inn (高砂館), Geothermal (地熱), and Lights of the Marketplace from the Mountain (從山上看街市的燈火). He also directed films such as The Election Campaign of Brother Ah San (阿三哥出馬), Sigh for Fireworks 1 and 2 (嘆煙花), Wrong Love (錯戀), and May 13 Heartbreaking Night (五月十三傷心夜).

== Career ==
Lin's father was in the mining industry. As a result, Lin came from a wealthy background and went on to study Political Economy at Meiji University in Japan in 1938. While at university, the manager of the Moulin Rouge in Shinjuku introduced him to the Toho Studio, where he worked as a director's assistant, laying the foundation for his future film career. After graduation, he joined the literary department of the Moulin Rouge in Shinjuku, Tokyo. From January 1943, Lin collaborated with local Taiwanese theater groups and organized study groups, producing popular works that were acclaimed as "the dawn of Taiwan's new drama movement" and a milestone in the history of modern Taiwanese drama.

After the February 28 Incident, Lin retired from the theater. He returned home and took over his family's business. He resumed his film career in 1957, founding the Yufeng Film Company and establishing a professional film industry in Taiwan. During his time at Yufeng, he directed six works. However, with the decline of Taiwanese dialect films, Lin stopped making movies in 1961. Although he briefly returned to filmmaking, Yufeng ceased operations in 1971.
