= Lin Dui =

Taiwanese socialist

Lin Dui (Chinese:林兑，Pinyin：lín duì，born 1906) was a native of Longjingzhuang, Dajia County (Chinese:台中州大甲郡龙井庄,pinyin:tái zhōng zhōu dà jiǎ jùn lóng jǐng zhuāng), Taichung Prefecture during the Japanese colonial period. A Taiwanese young man living in Japan with a radical political stance. During his stay in Japan, he was actively engaged in the Socialism movement with strong anti-colonial overtones at the time. He once participated in the 27 Brigade. Later, he was arrested and imprisoned by the Kuomintang authorities many times and fell into despair. His whereabouts after being released from prison are unknown (one theory is that his position had changed and he would no longer participate in politics or social movements after his release. Another said: After torture and imprisonment, Lin Dui finally suffered a mental breakdown).

== School days ==
Lin Dui once studied at Taipei Normal School, but was expelled from the school because of his participation in the student unrest triggered by the travel incident. After dropping out of school, Lin Dui received the help of Chiang Wei-shui, an alumnus of Beijing Normal University, and went to Tokyo to study in March 1925. He transferred to the third grade of the five-year Japanese university junior high school and graduated in March 1928. During his stay in Japan, he actively participated in political and social movements. He once participated in a Petition Movement for the Establishment of a Taiwanese Parliament. He also successively participated in the Taiwan Cultural Movement Reform Association, the Social Science Research Association (later renamed: "Taiwan Academic Research Association"), the Taiwan Youth Association in Tokyo, and Japanese Communist Party and other groups.

During his stay in Japan, Lin Dui lived with left-wing figures such as Chen Zhiqi, Wang Liansheng, Lin Tianjin, Wang Minchuan, Lin Chaozong, He Huoyan, and Zhuang Shou, and his thoughts became increasingly left-leaning. After his arrest in the April 16th Incident, Lin Dui once confessed to the Japanese side his past left-leaning and the reasons for joining the Communist Party. He mentioned that while he was studying at the Junior High School of Nihon University in 1926, he had been influenced by his fellow residents Lin Chaozong and Lin Tianjin, and he began to Become interested in socialism, worship Lenin, long for communist society, discuss socialist issues together, read the works of Japanese socialists Hitoshi Yamakawa, Sakai Toshihiko and others, as well as "Historical Materialism" and "Proletarian News" (the organ of the Japanese Communist Party) and other left-wing publications.

== Short-lived action ==
Lin Dui was not the founder of the Taiwanese Communist Party, nor did he actively join the Communist Party. Instead, he joined the party through the recommendation of his friend Chen Laiwang. On September 23, 1928, four people including Lin Dui, Chen Laiwang, Lin Mushun, and Lin Tianjin organized the Tokyo Special Branch of the Communist Party of Japan. During the meeting, it was decided that this organization would achieve two goals. First, establish a strong relationship between the Taiwan Academic Research Association and the Tokyo Taiwan Branch. The Youth Association established the party's guiding position in order to recruit Taiwanese students as party members; second, establish a relationship with the Japanese Communist Party and Taiwan party organizations. At the end of 1928, Lin Dui, Xiao Laifu, Huang Zongyao, He Huoyan, Chen Quansheng, Lin Sang, Su Xin and Chen Laiwang met three times at the site of the "Taiwan Popular Times" under the Tokyo Cultural Association to discuss the organization's guiding line and activity content, and made a Several important decisions were made. Lu Xiuyi, a scholar who wrote the history of the Communist Party of Taiwan, listed six points in his book: 1. Organize Taiwanese people in schools. 2. Reform the Taiwan Youth Association in Tokyo and make it a mass organization under the guidance of the Tokyo Special Branch. 3. Publish a newspaper. 4. Organize a Taiwanese alliance to support "Proletarian News". 5. Organize a support committee to rescue victims of the Taiwan liberation movement. 6. Issue a letter of support for the Taiwan Farmers’ Association Congress to be held at the end of 1928. On January 2 of the following year, he held a meeting with the branch members. During the meeting, a decision was made to reorganize the seven local groups into ten school groups and assign each person's tasks. He decided to strengthen the recruitment of party members and take on the responsibility of selling "Proletarian News" "work. The important decisions made at these meetings became the content of Lin Dui's future actions. In February 1929, he received the Communist Party membership card by mail, and began to circulate "Red Flag" from Chen Laiwang and others. Before being replaced in April, Lin Dui and other members of the Tokyo Special Branch of the Communist Party of Taiwan held successive meetings Several secret meetings.

Lin Dui and other branch members successfully seized the leadership of the Tokyo Youth Association. At the meeting on February 3, 1929, they tried to get the conference to pass a resolution to reform the Youth Association and establish the "Japanese Taiwan Students Association"; later, they The Tokyo Youth Association was further transformed into a left-wing organization of Taiwanese in Tokyo, and a decision made at the previous secret meeting was implemented: "Reform the Tokyo Taiwan Youth Association so that it becomes a mass organization under the guidance of the Tokyo Special Branch." In addition to transforming the Tokyo Youth Association, Lin Dui and other branch members also obtained leadership of the Taiwan Academic Research Association, a left-wing organization, and actively recruited party members. In addition to infiltrating student organizations, Lin Dui and his branch members also actively participated in Taiwan's peasant movement, trying to turn Taiwan's peasant associations into an organization under the control of the Taiwan Communist Party. In the summer of 1928, Lin Dui returned to Taiwan during his vacation and got in touch with Jian Ji, a leader of the farmers' association, and Xie Xuehong, a member of the Taiwan Communist Party. At the end of November of the same year, Lin Dui returned to Taiwan with the instructions of the branch and the countermeasures for farmers' issues prepared by Lin Mushun. Later, he jointly guided the second conference of the Taiwan Farmers' Association with Jian Ji, Xie Xuehong and others to strengthen the influence of the Taiwan Communist Party on Taiwan's farmers' activities. . However, Lin Dui refused to serve as secretary of the Central Committee of the Peasants' Union and returned to Tokyo in January 1929.

Not long after Lin Dui returned to Tokyo, on April 15, 1929, the Japanese police found a list of Japanese Communist Party members from the leader of the Japanese Communist Party organization, Sueyoshi Mataba. There were three Taiwanese on the list; in order to know the identities of these three Taiwanese Names, Tokyo police arrested forty-three leading members of the Taiwan Academic Research Association in one go. After investigation, the Japanese police discovered that the three Taiwanese were Chen Laiwang, Lin Dui, and Lin Tianjin. The three became the targets of the Japanese police's arrest. The Tokyo branch also collapsed due to this incident and disappeared from the stage of history.

== After being released from prison ==
After the April 16 incident, Lin Dui was arrested by the Japanese police because his identity as a communist was exposed. Lin Dui was released from prison on parole in 1931, but he did not change his ambition. He negotiated with Ye Qiumu, Lai Tongyao and others to continue the past movement and wanted to form another national struggle group mainly composed of Taiwanese students in Tokyo. After some discussions, he It was decided to establish the "Taiwan Issues Research Association". After the "Taiwan Issues Research Society" was established, members like Lin Dui not only held reading clubs to discuss issues such as the communist movement in Taiwan and the dissolution of cultural associations, but they also worked hard to save other victims of the April 16th Incident. In 1932, Lin Dui, Zhang Lixu, Liao Chengtang, Ye Qiumu, Lu Shifen, Lu Jianghan and other members of the "Taiwan Issues Research Society" established the "Tokyo Local Committee Josai District Koenji No. 1" under the "Japan Red Rescue Society" Class 15" actively organizes friendly activities to attract students from Taiwan and Japan. In July 1932, the "Japanese Red Relief Society" established the "Colonial Countermeasures Department", and Lin Dui joined the "Colonial Countermeasures Department" to engage in contact activities between the society and left-wing people in Taiwan and North Korea.

== Moved into the left-wing literary and artistic movement ==
In June 1931, Wang Baiyuan's collection of poems and essays "The Road of Thorns" was published. After Lin Dui read this collection of poems and essays, he didn't know whether he was moved by the Socialism ideas contained in the collection of poems or essays, or out of the usual rational calculations of political and business figures - he felt that the author's political ideology was similar to his own, so he began to correspond with Wang Baiyuan, and then exchanged opinions on the proletarian art movement, and finally proposed a plan to organize the Taiwan Proletarian Cultural Alliance.

On March 25, 1932, Lin Dui, Wang Baiyuan, Wu Kunhuang and others established the "Taiwanese Communist Party" as the first step to organize the Taiwan Proletarian Stage Cultural Alliance, and tried to use this legal method to cover up the illegal, so that some Taiwan Communists Members of the Japanese Communist Party and the Japanese Communist Party were mixed in, secretly exchanging messages with the Communist Party of Taiwan, the Chinese Communist Party, the Japanese Communist Party, the Japanese Communist Party, and left-wing groups in Japan and North Korea to establish a united front to fight against imperialism and feudalism. On July 31 of the same year, he met with Wang Baiyuan, Wu Kunhuang and others to discuss the issue of the association's publication NEWS and fund raising issues; but on September 1 of the same year, Ye Qiu Mu, a member of the association, was reported for participating in an anti-imperialist demonstration. The Taiwanese Information about the establishment and operation of the Cultural Association was discovered by the Japanese authorities. Later, Lin Dui, Zhang Wenhuan, Wang Baiyuan, Zhang Lixu and others were arrested by the Japanese police, and the association collapsed and disappeared. Although Wang Baiyuan, Lin Dui, Zhang Wenhuan and others organized a literary and art association, it was continued through the efforts of others. After Zhang Wenhuan, Wu Kunhuang and others were released, they jointly established a legal and moderate literary and art association with other young people in Japan. However, Lin Dui was unable to participate in the group "Taiwan Art Research Association" due to his arrest; he was imprisoned again on November 4, 1932, and then disappeared.

Lin Dui later ran a lumber shop in the Wuquan West Road area of Taichung City, and helped his classmate Zhou Zonghe, who had been dropped out of Taipei Normal University in his early years, arrange a residence. Participated in the 27 Brigade in the 228th Incident. During the White Terror, according to the oral memory of Zhou Zonghe's second son Zhou Haixiong (joint video interview with Chen Baiqian and Zhou Keren on December 28, 2018), Lin Dui was said to have been purged and imprisoned by the Kuomintang, and there was no news from him again.
