= Wang Chang-hsiung =

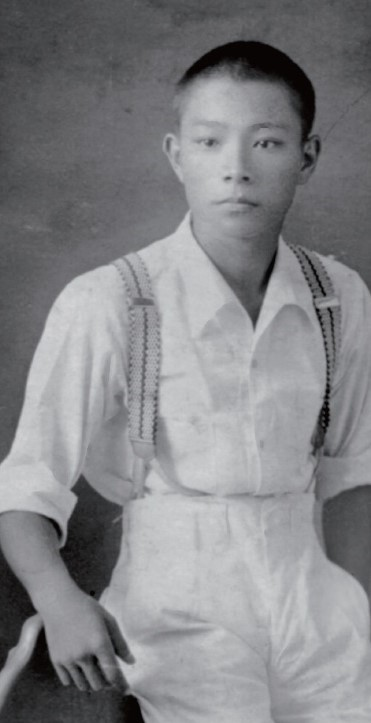
Portrait of Wang Chang-hsiung in his youth.

Wang Chang-hsiung (Chinese: 王昶雄; 1915–2000), originally named Wang Jung-sheng (王榮生), was a dentist and writer born in Tamsui District, New Taipei City, Taiwan. He gained recognition for his novella A Raging Torrent (奔流) published in 1943, which received diverse reviews due to its seemingly political nature and struggles with national identity.

== Works ==
Wang Chang-hsiung entered Nihon University in 1935 and published new poems like "Notes from a Narrow Lane" (陋巷札記) and the novella Ripples of the Tamsui River (淡水河之漣漪) in the Taiwan New People Newspaper (臺灣新民報) during his study in Tokyo. Ripples of the Tamsui River was his first fiction published in a newspaper. In 1942, he returned to Taiwan and opened a dental clinic in Tamsui. Besides his profession, he continued writing and gained attention with the novella A Raging Torrent in 1943. Due to political circumstances, Wang suspended his writing activities until around the 1960s. In 1958, he wrote the lyrics for the song "If We Open the Doors of Our Hearts" (阮若打開心內的門窗), composed by Lu Chuan-sheng (呂泉生), becoming a representative work in the popular Taiwanese music of that time.

== Reception ==
At the time of its publication, A Raging Torrent was regarded by the Japanese colonial authorities as a pinnacle work of Imperial Subject Literature. The story depicts the emotional journey of characters like Ito Shunsai (伊東 春生) and Lin Bonien (林柏年) under Japanese colonial rule, ostensibly praising the greatness of Imperialization while highlighting the suffering of the people in Taiwan who couldn't adapt.

Scholars have debated the political stance of A Raging Torrent and related works from the same period. Some argue that, in the context of the time and space in which A Raging Torrent was published, all articles in Taiwan were Imperialized Subject Literature; others contend that it was all protest literature, not Imperialized Subject Literature. There are also scholars who see protest literature and Imperial SubjectLiterature as classification methods used by researchers studying the new literature of Taiwan in the Japanese era.
