= New Taiwanese Literature =

- Traditional Chinese: 台灣新文學
- Hanyu Pinyin: Táiwān Xīn Wénxué
- Hokkien POJ: Tâi-oân Sin Bûn-ha̍k

New Taiwanese Literature, also referred to as Taiwanese New Literature or by the Japanese name Taiwan Shinbungaku, was a literary magazine published briefly during the period of Japanese rule over Taiwan. The editor-in-chief, Yō Ki, had previously been on the board of another journal, Taiwan Bungei, but left after a dispute regarding editorial policy and established New Taiwanese Literature. The first issue was published in December 1935. Yō supported the magazine with his own funds, soliciting contributions from not only local writers, but Japanese writers of the proletarian literature movement such as Hayama Yoshiki, Ishikawa Tatsuzō, and Hirabayashi Taiko as well as Korean writer Chō Kakuchū (張 赫宙). In total, 15 issues of the magazine went to press. It published works in Japanese as well as Chinese, but was nevertheless ordered to cease publication in April 1937 in part of a wider campaign to prohibit the use of the Chinese language. Its closure represented the start of a period of stasis in the development of Taiwanese literature which would last until Yō Unhei established the Shijin Kyōkai (詩人協会) in 1939.
