= Wu Hsin-jung =

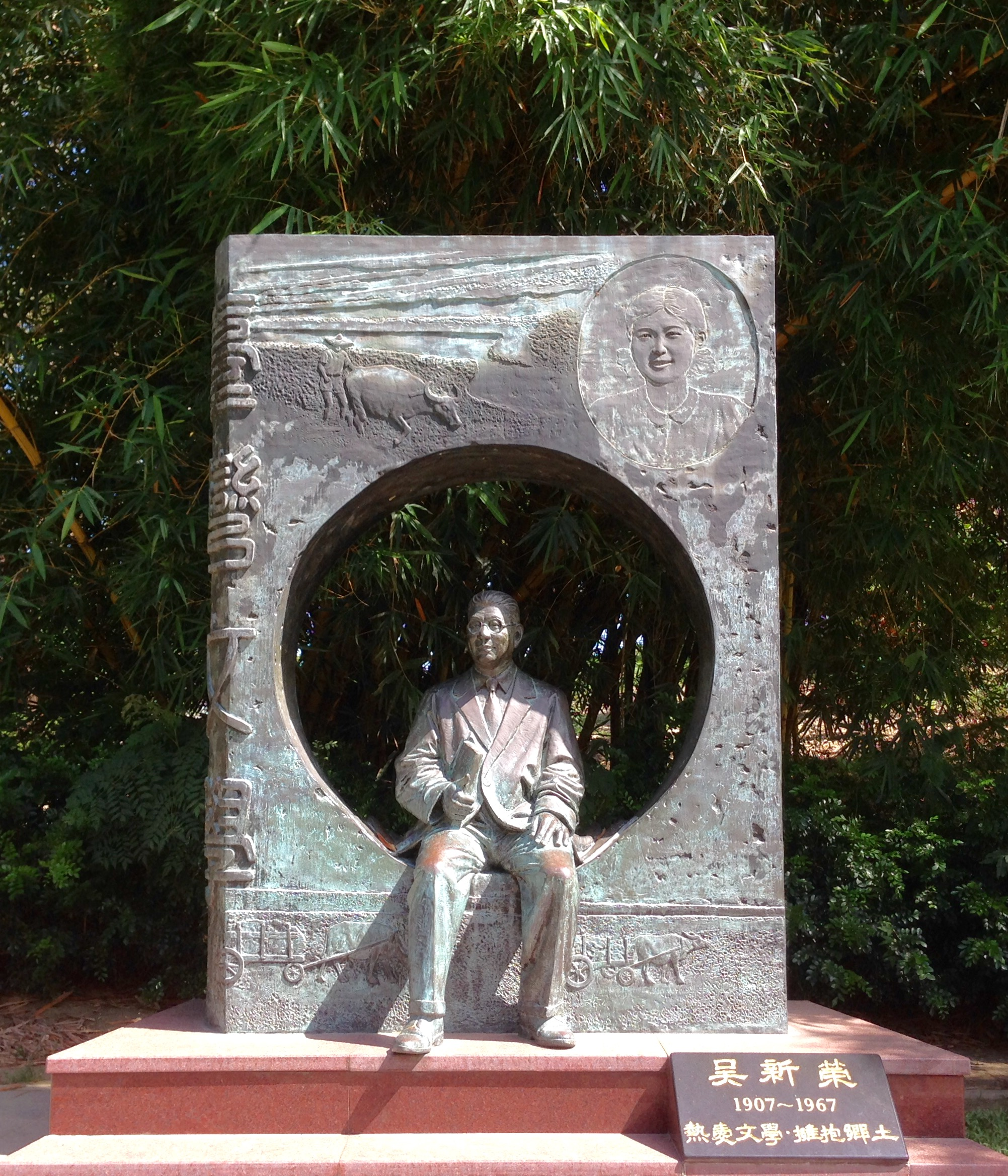
Wu Hsin-jung Memorial Statue.

Wu Hsin-jung (Note: Courtesy name Shih-min (史民), pseudonyms Chen-ying (震瀛), Chao-hsing (兆行), or later Suo-Lang-shan-fang-chu-jen (琑琅山房主人, literally “Owner of the Crystal and Clear Mountain House”)) (Chinese: 吳新榮; Taiwanese: Ngôo Sin-îng; October 12, 1907 – March 27, 1967) was a prominent figure in the literary group known as the Saline Land and was also a physician and political figure. He was from Siaolung Subprefecture, Yenshui Port Prefecture, which is present-day Jiangjun District, Tainan City, Taiwan.

== Activities ==
Around 1930, Wu Hsin-jung began publishing new poems, describing himself as "a doctor by profession and a literary lover by passion". He actively engaged in literary creation and activities. Later, he participated in the Taiwan Alliance for Literature and Arts and, in 1935, co-founded the Taiwan Literature and Art Association Jiali Branch with Kuo Shui-t'an and others. Since many works of the Taiwan Alliance for Literature and Arts Jiali Branch were inspired by the local Saline Land, this literary school was also called the Saline Land School. After the dissolution of the association in 1936, Wu Hsin-jung continued to publish works in literary magazines and was later known as one of the Seven of Beimen (北門七子).

For a period, Wu Hsin-jung was actively involved in public affairs and politics. He was elected as a councilman in Tainan County after World War II, but later shifted his focus to local history research and writing after facing consecutive election defeats around 1950. He edited the quarterly Tainan Vignettes (南瀛文獻) and worked on books such as Tainan County Gazette (台南縣志稿) and Annals of the Changes of Nankunshen Temple (南鯤鯓代天府沿革志).

After Wu Hsin-jung's passing, his works were compiled into The Complete Works of Wu Hsin-jung (published by Vista Publishing) and three volumes of Selected Works of Wu Hsin-jung (published by Tainan Cultural Center). In 2007, the National Museum of Taiwan Literature published Wu Hsin-jung 1933-1937 (吳新榮日記全集), which became an important historical source for understanding southern Taiwan.
