= Yang Yun-pin =

Taiwanese writer and historian

Yang Yun-pin (Chinese: 楊雲萍; Pe̍h-ōe-jī: Iûⁿ Hûn-phêng; October 17, 1906 - August 6, 2000) was a Taiwanese writer and historian. His pen name, Yun-pin (雲萍), comes from the fact that he published an article in the Taiwanese newspaper The Taiwan Minpao (臺灣民報) in 1924 under the name "Yun Ping Sheng of Shilin" (士林雲萍生). He was one of the key figures in the Taiwanese New Literature Movement.

Yang Yun-pin was born in Shirin, Taihoku, Taiwan, during the Japanese rule period. In 1925, he co-founded the first Taiwanese vernacular magazine, People Periodical (人人), with the writer Chiang Meng-pi (江夢筆). This magazine played a crucial role in the rise of the Taiwanese New Literature Movement and marked the beginning of literary works written in vernacular Chinese in Taiwan. After returning to Taiwan from Japan, he delved into the study of the history and culture of the Ming Dynasty and the history and culture of Taiwan. After 1945, he served as a columnist for newspapers and magazines and held teaching positions in several schools.

== Style ==
Yang Yun-pin's classical Chinese education came from his grandfather, and he was also fluent in Japanese. As a result, he was exposed to world trends and developed a sense of identity with the language of his cultural homeland, "Chinese language". In 1926, Yang Yun-pin traveled to Japan, where he was influenced by the writers Kan Kikuchi and Yasunari Kawabata. His Chinese novels were all published during this time.

In contrast to the leftist literature that was popular in Taiwan at the time, Yang Yun-pin maintained that artistic aesthetics should be used to document the history of the colonial period. His short stories are relatively short and do not contain any sharp ideological messages. Instead, they contain a hidden resistance to Japanese rule, as well as a dispassionate intellect and a poetic spirit. He wrote a new poetry collection titled Mountain and River (山河) and an old poetry collection titled Collection of Poetic Musings (吟草集).
