= Kuo Shui-t'an =

Taiwanese poet

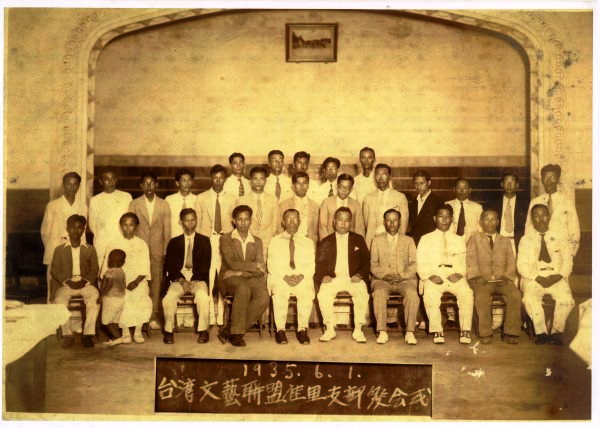
In the 1935 Taiwan Literature and Art Association Jiali Branch meeting, the person standing in the front row, seventh from the right, is Kuo Shui-t'an.

Kuo Shui-t'an (Chinese: 郭水潭; February 7, 1908 – March 9, 1995), also known by the pen name Chien-chih (千尺), was a prominent figure in the literature of the Saline Land during the Japanese rule period in Taiwan. Hailing from Jiali in Tainan, he was one of the seven notable poets known as the "Seven of Beimen" (北門七子). Due to his education in Japanese, his primary language of creative expression was Japanese and was already involved in the creation of haiku and short poems during his student years. He was also actively involved in various literary organizations, including Nan Ming Paradise Society (南溟樂園社), the Taiwan Literature and Art Association, and the publication Taiwan New Literature (臺灣新文學).

== Works ==
Kuo Shui-t'an initially entered the Taiwanese literary field through the creation of Japanese short poems, and his works were featured in the Imperial Year 2594 Poetry Collection (皇紀二五九四年歌集). His literary genres included short poems, haiku, novels, diaries, essays, critiques, and modern poetry. He began by studying classical Japanese literature and short poems, gaining later recognition for his modern poetry. His works encompassed both lyrical poetry and social criticism. Notably, his poem "Mourning at the Coffin" (向棺木慟哭), lamenting the death of his second son, was hailed by critic Lung Ying-tsung (龍瑛宗) as "the most touching masterpiece of 1939." In 1935, his autobiographical novel in the form of a diary, A Man's Memoirs (某男人的手記), earned him the Newcomer Award in the Main Island from the Osaka Daily News (大阪每日新聞). Kuo Shui-t'an was also honored with the Tainan Literature Award (南瀛文學獎) for Special Contributions.

== Reception ==
Huang Wu-chung (黃武忠) noted that his poetry tended towards realistic literature, primarily focusing on depicting the scenes of his hometown and nativist literature. Kuo's works often revealed personal thoughts, exposed societal inequalities, and expressed resistance against the oppression of Japanese imperial rule. Some of his poems and novels carried elements of class criticism, satirizing oppressive class systems and conveying the sentiments of the laboring masses.

His collected works have been published in The Kuo Shui-t'an Collection edited by Yang Tzu-chiao (羊子喬) and in Compilation of Research Materials on Contemporary Taiwanese Writers Volume 56: Kuo Shui-t'an by the National Museum of Taiwan Literature.
