= Taiwan Communist Party =

1994–2020 social democratic party in Taiwan

Taiwan Communist Party 臺灣共產黨
- Chairman: Wang Lao-yang
- Vice Chairmen: Chien Ping-hung; Wu Miao-huo
- Founder: Wang Lao-yang
- Founded: 16 October 1994; 32 years ago
- Registered: 20 July 2008; 18 years ago
- Dissolved: 29 April 2020; 6 years ago
- Membership: approx. 2,000 (2008 est.)
- Ideology: Social democracy; Three Principles of the People; Factions: Marxism
- Political position: Centre-left

Party flag

Taiwan Communist Party
- Traditional Chinese: 臺灣共產黨
- Simplified Chinese: 台湾共产党
Transcriptions
Standard Mandarin
- Hanyu Pinyin: Táiwān Gòngchǎndǎng
Wu
- Romanization: De^{平}uae^{平} Gon^{去}tshae^{上}taon^{上}
Hakka
- Romanization: Thòi-vàn Khiung-sán-tóng
Yue: Cantonese
- Jyutping: Toi^{4}waan^{1} Gung^{6}caan^{2}dong^{2}
Southern Min
- Hokkien POJ: Tâi-oân Kiōng-sán-tóng

The Taiwan Communist Party (Note: In local languages: Traditional Chinese script: 臺灣共產黨; Mandarin Pinyin: Táiwān Gòngchǎndǎng; Hokkien: Tâi-oân Kiōng-sán-tóng; Sixian Hakka: Thòi-vàn Khiung-sán-tóng) was a social democratic political party in Taiwan. It was founded in 1994, but it could not register with the Ministry of the Interior until 2008, when the Constitutional Court removed anti-communist provisions from the Constitution of the Republic of China. The party was abolished by the Ministry of the Interior in 2020.

== History ==
The Taiwan Communist Party was founded by Wang Lao-yang on 16 October 1994 in Sinhua, Tainan. Before founding the party, Wang was an active member of the Democratic Progressive Party (DPP). Wang left the DPP after an internal party struggle, in which the faction he favoured lost.

A wealthy landowning farmer, Wang spent the next thirteen years and NT$60 million (US$1.85 million in 2008) trying to register the Taiwan Communist Party with the Ministry of the Interior, but his annual applications were repeatedly rejected. It was not until 20 June 2008 that Wang's goal was finally realised; on that day, the justices of the Constitutional Court ruled the prohibition of communism in Taiwan unconstitutional, thus allowing the registration of communist parties. Wang subsequently registered the Taiwan Communist Party on the same day, making it the first party to legally include "communist" in its name after the ruling.

Wang claimed that the party had grown to 2,000 members by the end of 2008.

On 29 April 2020, the Ministry of the Interior abolished the political party status of the Taiwan Communist Party.

== Ideology ==
Although the party had "communist" in its name, Wang stated in an interview that he had never read the works of Karl Marx or Vladimir Lenin, and he only chose the name because he thought it would attract more interest. Wang described the party as social democratic, and advocated the establishment of a welfare state and mutual aid in Taiwan. Wang also stated that the party's purpose was to "create a socialist paradise in Taiwan" by "upholding the socialist line and the legacy of Sun Yat-sen and his Three Principles of the People".

However, one of the party's vice chairmen, Chien Ping-hung, stated in an interview that the party had an ideologically diverse membership, from moderate progressives disillusioned with the DPP to devout Marxists. For example, another vice chairman of the party, Wu Miao-huo, claimed to have spent two decades studying Marxism in Mainland China. Nonetheless, the party was officially not communist; as such, it did not attempt to establish relations with the Chinese Communist Party.
