= Taiwan Alliance for Literature and Arts =

Literary organization founded in 1934

The Taiwan Alliance for Literature and Arts was founded on May 6, 1934, as a private literary organization. The alliance brought together Taiwanese literary artists of various styles and schools at that time, with Chang Shen-chieh (張深切), Lai Ming-hung (賴明弘), Yang Kui (楊逵), and Loa Ho (賴和) as the leading writers. The alliance held activities throughout Taiwan and as far away as Tokyo, Japan. In addition to hosting literary lectures and forums and publishing art booklets in various places, it also published its official journal, the Taiwan-Bungei (Taiwan Literature and Arts). The founding and activities of the association are seen by scholars as a shift from political movements to cultural resistance in the 1930s.

Researcher Huang Wu-chung (黃武忠) believes that the alliance and the Taiwan-Bungei adequately represent the Taiwanese literary scene of the time and that they served as a spiritual fortress for Taiwanese intellectuals. Its role was no less than a spiritual pillar and a platform for expression, fostering close bonds among writers. The establishment of the alliance gave the Taiwanese literary movement consciousness, visualization and readiness. Based in Taichung, the Taiwan-Bungei appealed to writers all over the island and worked closely with its Tokyo branch. With the largest number of writers, it was the longest-running and most culturally influential literary magazine founded by Taiwanese, and it added luster to the new Taiwanese literary movement. With the establishment of the association, the new Taiwanese literary movement gradually moved away from politics to the realm of pure literature.

The official journal of the Taiwan Alliance for Literature and Arts, the Taiwan-Bungei, was published by the Central Bookstore in Taichung. It was published monthly from November 1934 to August 1936 and accepted articles in Chinese, Japanese, and Taiwanese. The content consisted of six categories: commentary, fiction, drama, poetry, essays, and academic research. After the journal ceased publication, the Taiwan Alliance for Literature and Arts was disbanded in August 1936.
