= Liu Shuqin =

Taiwanese researcher

Liu Shuqin (born November 1, 1969) is a researcher of Taiwanese literature who works at the Institute of Taiwanese Literature at Tsinghua University. Her research specialties include Taiwanese literature during the Japanese colonial period, Colonialism and literary production, and Comparative literature of East Asian colonies.

== Life ==
Liu Shuqin was born on November 1, 1969, in Hualien, Taiwan. She once did short-term research at the Graduate School of Humanities and Social Sciences of the University of Tokyo.

=== Research philosophy and academic concern ===
Regarding the rising atmosphere of nationalism (whether in China or Taiwan) within the Department of Literature in Taiwan and in the country, Liu Shuqin once advised readers in the preface of her representative work "The Thorny Road: Literary Activities and Cultural Struggles of Taiwanese Youth in Japan," saying: "While fighting colonialism, the nation-state has to some extent fallen into the perspective of cultural essentialism. Nationalism has stifled various local differences, suppressed the multiple possibilities of local literature, and reduced multiple local cultural traditions." Compared with some scholars who use postcolonial discourse as a weapon for their discourse or as a theoretical basis for supporting Taiwan's independence or unification, she has a different view on postcolonial discourse, believing that "the ultimate goal of postcolonial discourse is to liberate various regional and indigenous words and expressions from the monocultural dictatorship, and naturally show an equal dialogue between the local and the rest of the world from the inside out."

Regarding the existence of "Taiwanese literature", especially the creation and intellectualization of Taiwanese literature, she does not believe that it is "the result of a temporary, one-party, or political operation," but instead that it has its causes and profound significance. In an article, she mentioned: "The canonization of Taiwanese literary works and the discipline of Taiwanese studies are cultural phenomena that can be objectively analyzed. This cultural phenomenon has long and profound social roots, reflecting our society's power and desire to express collective emotions and understand our land and history."

She is very concerned about the problems of "Taiwan usually has only one or a few representatives participating," "weak numbers", and "lack of a generational team." She believes this phenomenon will eventually affect the voice of Taiwanese and Taiwanese literature in the international academic community and create a disadvantage in academic inheritance and international competition for the next generation.

Regarding the development of Taiwanese literary research, Liu Shuqin believes that thinking about "what Taiwanese literature can give back to society" is more important and urgent than "discussing research topics and research methods in detail." At the "Current Issues in Taiwanese Literature Symposium" held by the Taiwan Research Center of the College of Humanities and Social Sciences at Providence University, the National Museum of Taiwanese Literature, the Taiwan Research Center platform, and relevant university departments and institutes were called upon to invite people from all walks of life to discuss the various changes that have occurred in the domestic cultural and educational fields in recent years through some means (such as a series of workshops) and to think about the various impacts these changes have brought to the discipline of, the social needs they reflect, and the strategies for responding to these changes.

== Literary work ==
Articles can be divided into "academic works" and "general works". As of now (August 27, 2014), the electronic files of most articles can be found on the personal web pages of teachers at the Institute of Taiwanese Literature at National Tsing Hua University.

=== Academic works ===
==== Dissertations ====
- "The Path of Thorns: Literary Activities and Cultural Struggles of Young People in Japan", PhD dissertation, Department of Chinese Literature, National Tsing Hua University, 2001.
- "War and Literature: Literary Activities in Taiwan during the Late Japanese Occupation", Master's dissertation, Department of History, National Taiwan University, 1994.

==== A whole book is a work composed of a single or multiple papers ====
Korean title:"식민지문학의 생태게：이중어체제 하의 타이완문학" (Chinese title: 《殖民地文学的生态系：双语体制下的台湾文学》), Yile Publishing House, Seoul, South Korea, May 14, 2012.

"The Path of Thorns: Literary Activities and Cultural Struggles of Taiwanese Youth in Japan,"(Chinese:《荆棘之道：台湾旅日青年的文学活动与文化抗争》) Lianjing Publishing House, published in May 2009. ---A work based on his doctoral thesis, supplemented, rewritten, and revised.

==== Books co-authored with ====
Liu Shuqin, Li Zhuoying, Zhao Qinghua, and others co-authored "Going to Dachuan: An Oral Biography of Ji Gang," National Taiwan Literature Museum, Tainan, June 2011.

Editor's work:

- Co-edited with Zhang Wenxun, Compilation of Research Materials of Contemporary Writers in Taiwan 6. Zhang Wenhuan, National Taiwan Literature Museum, Tainan, March 2011.
- Self-edited, War and demarcation: Main Body Reshaping and Cultural Politics of Taiwan and South Korea under the "General War", Lianjing Publishing House, Taipei, March 2011.
- Edited with Xu Peixian and Shi Wanshun, "Local Culture in the Empire": The Cultural Situation of Taiwan during the Japanization (Wu Mi-cha planned the book), Sower Publishing House, Taipei, 2008.
- Co-edited with Qiu Guifen, Post-Colonial East Asia Localization Thinking: Taiwan Literature Field, Preparatory Office of Taiwanese Literature Museum, 2006.
- Edited with Chen Wanyi and Xu Weiyu, Complete Works of Zhang Wenhuan (Volume 8, Data Collection), Collection of Taichung County Cultural Center, April 1998.

Translation:

- He Tian Yi's "The Conflict between the East and the West: Modern Western Civilization, Natsume Sōseki, and Zhang Taiyan" is included in the Proceedings of the International Conference on the Dilemma and Outway of Modernization in East Asia, which was published by the National Policy Research Center of the Chinese Cultural Rejuvenation Movement in July 1995.
- Yoshio Tsuji "Zhou Jinbo's Theory: Focusing on Series Works," was published in the 8th issue of Literary Taiwan in October 1993.
- Masayoshi Matsunaga, "Literary Activities in Taiwan", published in Contemporary No. 87, pages 13–29, July 1993.
- Gilfilla, S. Colum, The Decline of the Roman Empire and Lead Poisoning published in Historiography in December 1989, pages 67–78.

=== General works ===
Literary creation:

Most of his papers and essays are published under their real names, and his poems are published under the pseudonym of Hibiscus.

Prose:

- "Taiwan and Northeast in the Intellect of History: Field Notes of Northeast Literature," published in Wenxun No. 320 in June 2012, pages 70~80.
- "Taiwanese Literature: The Softest and Most Beautiful Business Card in Taiwan" was published in the album "Taiwanese Literature and Me" in October 2011, pages 41–46.
- "Echor," included in "Nanfeng: Lin Fan's Return to the Peach and Plum Collection" (Taipei: Printing Publishing House), July 2010, pages 79~101. --Reminiscing the time with the teacher (Lin Ruiming, pseudonym: Lin Fan).

New poem:

- "Master", included in "South Wind: Lin Fan's Return of Peaches and Plums" (Taipei: Printing Publishing House), July 2010, pages 11–12.
- "Erythrina variegata," published in the 21st issue of Ecological Taiwan, October 2008, page 60.
- "Smile" and "Mengshan Shi Shi" were published in the fourth issue of Xindi Literature in June 2008, pages 99–101.
- "Epic Flower" and "May Rain" were published in the first issue of "New Land Literature" in September 2007, pages 133~134.

== Judgment of others ==
- Criticism of her research orientation:

Because she advocated that the study of Taiwanese literature during the Japanese rule should adopt "positivism" and advocated that another Taiwanese writer, You Shengguan, should take a "critical" position, she wrote an article to review "critical" academic research. You Shengguan also wrote an article criticizing the research orientation of Liu Shuqin, Huang Mei'e, and other scholars and their interpretation of the historical materials and research objects of Taiwanese literature during Japanese rule.

- Comments on her research results:

Zeng Shirong's "The Way of Thorns: Literary Activities and Cultural Struggles of Taiwanese Youth Traveling to Japan" by Liu Shuqin: This article was published in "Research on Taiwan History" (Taipei City: Institute of Taiwan History, Academia Sinica) in December 2011, page 241–249.
