= List of Taiwanese writers =

This is a list of authors from Taiwan.

- Bi Pu 畢璞
- Bo Yang 柏楊
- Chang, Belinda 章緣 (Zhang Yuan)
- Cai Sufen 蔡素芬
- Chang Hsiu-ya 張秀亞 (Hsin-ching)
- Chen Ruoxi 陳若曦 (Chen Jo-hsi)
- Chen Yingzhen 陳映真
- Cheng Ching-wen: see Zheng Qingwen
- Chiang Kuei 姜貴
- Chiung Yao 瓊瑤
- Chou Meng-tieh 周夢蝶
- Chu Hsi-ning 朱西甯
- Chu T'ien-hsin 朱天心
- Chu T'ien-wen 朱天文
- Chung Chao-cheng 鍾肇政
- Danny Wen 溫士凱
- Hsiao Sa 蕭颯 (Xiao Sa)
- Hsing Chia-hui 幸佳慧
- Huang Fan 黃凡
- Huang Chunming 黃春明 (Hwang Chun-ming)
- Huang Fengzi
- Kao Yi-feng
- Kuo Cheng 郭箏
- Lai He 賴和
- R. C. T. Lee 李家同
- Li Ang 李昂
- Li Ao 李敖
- Li Li 李黎
- Lin Haiyin 林海音
- Lin Huaimin 林懷民
- Lin Wenyue 林文月
- Lo Fu 洛夫 (Mo Luofu)
- Lung Ying-tai 龍應台
- Ma Sen 馬森
- Nie Hualing 聶華苓
- Ouyang Tzu 歐陽子
- Pai Hsien-yung 白先勇
- Ping Lu 平路
- Qiu Miaojin 邱妙津 (Chiu Miao-chin)
- Rong Zi 蓉子 (Wang Rongzi)
- Sanmao 三毛
- Shi Shuqing 施淑青
- Su Weizhen 蘇偉貞
- Tsai Chih-chan 蔡旨禅
- Wang Ching-lin: See Ya Xian
- Wang Tuoh 王拓
- Wang Wenhua 王文華
- Wang Wenxing 王文興
- Wang Zhenhe 王禎和 (Wang Zhen-ho)
- Wei Zi-Yun 魏子雲 (Zi-Yun Wei)
- Wu Zhuoliu 吳濁流 (Wu Chuo-liu)
- Wu Ming-yi 吳明益
- Xi Murong 席慕容
- Yang Kui 楊逵 (Yang K'uei)
- Yang Mu 楊牧
- Yang Chian-Ho 楊千鶴
- Yang Shuang-zi 楊雙子
- Ya Xian 瘂弦
- Ye Shitao 葉石濤 (Yeh Shih-tao)
- Yu Guangzhong 余光中
- Yu Lihua 于梨華
- Yuan Chiung-chiung 袁瓊瓊
- Zhang Dachun 張大春
- Zhang Xiguo 張系國 (Chang Hsi-kuo)
- Zhang Yingtai 張瀛太
- Zheng Qingwen 鄭清文 (Cheng Ching-wen)
- Chung Ling 鍾玲
- Zhong Zhaozheng: see Chung Chao-cheng
- Zhu Tianwen: see Chu T'ien-wen
- Zhu Tianxin: see Chu T'ien-hsin
- Zhu Xining: see Chu Hsi-ning

== See also ==
- List of Taiwanese people
- Literature of Taiwan
- National Museum of Taiwanese Literature
- Culture of Taiwan
