= 2021 in Taiwan =

- Decades: 2000s; 2010s; 2020s
- See also: Other events of 2021; History of Taiwan • Timeline • Years

Events from the year 2021 in Taiwan, Republic of China.

== Incumbents ==
- President: Tsai Ing-wen
- Vice President: Lai Ching-te
- Heads of Five Yuan
  - Executive Yuan/Premier: Su Tseng-chang
  - Legislative Yuan: Yu Shyi-kun
  - Judicial Yuan: Hsu Tzong-li
  - Examination Yuan: Huang Jong-tsun
  - Control Yuan: Chen Chu

== General ==
- 24th happiest country in the world and the first in Asia on the 2021 World Happiness Report.
- 43th in 2021 World Press Freedom Index.
- Top destination for expats, according to the Expat Insider Survey by InterNations.
- Taiwan ranks 8th in "World Competitiveness" in the World Competitiveness Yearbook published June 17 by Swiss International Institute for Management Development.

== Events ==
Drought.

=== January ===
- 6 January - Minister of Health and Welfare Chen Shih-chung, Slovenian Prime Minister and acting Minister of Health Janez Janša, hold a virtual meeting.
- 10 January - United States Secretary of State Mike Pompeo lifts all restrictions on Taiwan-U.S. official exchanges.
- January 11 - New passport released, making "Republic of China" smaller and emphasizing "Taiwan" on the cover.
- January 13 - Ministry of the Interior National Immigration Agency announces the 7th automatic 30-day visa extensions for foreigners who have legally stayed in Taiwan for 180 days or more.
- January 14 - President Tsai Ing-wen meets with United States U.N. Ambassador Kelly Craft via videoconference.
- January 18 - Minister of Foreign Affairs Joseph Wu accepts copy of credentials from Haiti ambassador Hervé Denis.
- January 19 - President Tsai meets British Office Taipei Representative John Dennis
- January 20 - Head of TECRO Hsiao Bi-khim represents Taiwan at the inauguration of the 46th U.S. President Joe Biden and Vice President Kamala Harris.
- January 21
  - Taiwanese Foreign Minister Joseph Wu attends Palau presidential inauguration.
  - The EP passes three resolutions calling for expanded partnership with Taiwan and support for Taiwan's participation in international organizations.
- January 23 - Taiwan-Japan friendship event at Taipei 101.
- January 24
  - 2 Taiwanese satellites are launched, in collaboration with SpaceX. The Flying Squirrel and Yushan.
  - CECC continues to monitor the new domestic COVID-19 cluster in Taoyuan and quarantines an estimated 5,000 individuals.
  - Taiwan's badminton duo win men's double at the Toyota Thailand Open.
- Jan 26 - Jan 31, All physical components of the 2021 Taipei International Book Exhibition (TiBE), canceled due to the COVID-19 pandemic. Online parts were held as scheduled.
- January 27
  - President Tsai Ing-wen launches a campaign regarding book reading in support of Taiwanese book publishers.
  - TECO Prague representative, Ke Liang-ruey, meets with Prague mayor Zdeněk Hřib and announces that Prague and Taiwan will have increased cooperation in science and education.
- January 28
  - Number of international students in Taiwan surpass 130,000.
  - Taiwan and United Kingdom ink a memorandum of understanding on agricultural cooperation.
  - Taiwan is ranked at 2nd place by The Economist in Asia-Pacific personalized health index.
- January 29
  - The Ministry of the Interior begins a study to change the national emblem due to its similarity with the Kuomintang party symbol.
  - Tainan begins self-driving bus test with passengers.
  - Taiwan has their 8th COVID-19 fatality.
- January 31 - Andrzej Duda signs law regarding legal cooperation in criminal matters between Taiwan and Poland.

=== February ===
- February 1
  - MOTC bans all eating and drinking on the THSR, on all TRA trains, on long-distance buses, on domestic flights, on ferries, and in post offices.
  - Artworks by late Taiwanese artist Hong Rui-lin are donated to the MOC.
  - A survey by the Chicago Council on Global Affairs found that the majority of opinion leaders in the United States, supported sending US troops to defend Taiwan from a Chinese invasion, while most of the American public opposes doing so, both regardless of partisan affiliation.
  - The establishment of National Yang Ming Chiao Tung University after merging between National Yang-Ming University and National Chiao Tung University.
- February 4
  - Taiwan established a trade office in Guyana.
  - The first American naval vessel entered the Taiwan Strait under Biden.
  - Semiconductor chip shortages, and Taiwan, which has one of the world's largest chipmaking industries, is at the center of efforts to resolve the shortage.
  - Taiwan plans to increase childcare subsidies and tax deductions, have more benefits for parents, and expand the number of spots at affordable preschools and day care facilities in an effort to lift the country's birthrates.
- February 5
  - Taiwanese film director Ang Lee received the Legion of Honour.
  - Guyana yields to Beijing's pressure and cancels representative office deal with Taiwan, saying the deal was a misunderstanding.
  - Taiwan's Minister of Economic Affairs Wang Mei-hua meets with “very senior U.S. officials,” such as Matt Murray (Deputy Assistant Secretary for Trade Policy and Negotiations Bureau of Economic and Business Affairs), the first high-level exchange between the Biden administration and Taiwan, to discuss mainly chip shortages.
  - Ministry of the Interior National Immigration Agency announces the 8th automatic 30-day visa extensions for foreigners who have legally stayed in Taiwan for 180 days or more.
  - Taiwan moves to enhance the performance of their water storage facilities.
- February 6 - Progress made on Taiwan La Fayette-class frigate scandal.
- February 9 - All Formosat satellites (Formosat-1, Formosat-2, Formosat-3, Formosat-4, Formosat-5, Formosat-6, Formosat-7) reach mission orbit.
- February 11 - NT$60 billion stimulus and bailout plan announced.
- February 12
  - Lunar New Year / Chinese New Year.
  - The National Airborne Service Corps begins to ask for payment for first aid and transportation due to a surge of rescue operations.
- February 18
  - U.S. Senator Rick Scott reintroduces the Taiwan Invasion Prevention Act bill.
  - U.S. lawmakers introduce bill to allow Taiwan attend WHO meetings as an observer.
  - Taiwan's first space development draft act is approved.
  - A Taiwanese NCSIST developed Teng Yun drone crashes.
- February 19
  - National security staff reorganization is announced.
  - President of Academia Sinica, James Liao, is awarded with Samson Prime Minister's Prize for Innovation in Alternative Energy and Smart Mobility for Transportation.
- February 24 - Taiwan-Poland legal agreement takes effect. (from Jan. 31)

=== March ===
- March 1
  - Regulations on foreign visitors are partially lifted, restrictions apply.
  - Taiwan allows non-R.O.C. citizens to visit Taiwan for non-urgent medical care with proper documents.
  - China bans Taiwanese pineapples, saying that the fruit has harmful organisms, creating a "Freedom Pineapple" movement.
- March 3-March 6 Taipei Cycle postpones all physical parts of the exhibition, online parts are still to be held on schedule.
- March 4
  - Freedom House scores Taiwan 94/100 in Freedom in the World report.
  - 8 Taiwanese Illustrators are selected for the 55th Illustrators Exhibition of Bologna's Children Book Fair.
- March 5 - Taiwan, US, and Eswatini have their first Partnership Opportunity Delegation.
- March 6 - Taiwan wins mixed doubles at WTT Contender Doha 2021.
- March 7
  - A man in Taoyuan kills two people with a firearm
  - HP CEO travels to Taiwan.
- March 11 - Many Taiwanese fruit are found to meet standards for consumption at Tokyo Olympics.
- March 12-April 4 - Taipei Rose Festival
- March 13 - CPBL 2021 Chinese Professional Baseball League season opening day.
- March 17 - 25th Taiwan-France Cultural Award awarded.
- March 18 - Salmon chaos: Restaurant chain Sushiro offers free sushi to people with the word for salmon (鮭魚) on their ID, resulting in many people requesting name changes.
- March 19
  - First batch of Oxford–AstraZeneca COVID-19 vaccine arrive at Taiwan.
  - Taipei City Police Department adds Teddy bears to all patrol vehicles.
  - Acer is hit with a Ransomware attack, with the cyber threat actors, REvil, demanding for $50,000,000 USD, a precedent.
- March 20 - Taiwan is ranked as 24th happiest country by in the world by the World Happiness Report, listed on page 22 as "province of China".
- March 22 - Two F-5E collide midair, 1 pilot dead, the second missing.
- March 23 - Panama registered container ship Ever Given operated by Taiwanese Evergreen Marine, becomes stuck in the Suez Canal, disrupting global shipping.
- March 27 - Yuguan Island Art Festival begins, ends on April 18.
- March 29 - Suez Canal obstruction resolved.
- March 10–15 - 2021 Taipei Fashion Week.
- March 30 - Palau president and first lady visits Taiwan.

=== April ===
- April 1
  - Travel Bubble between Taiwan and Palau launched.
  - Large Solar power plant opens.
- April 2 - Hualien train derailment killed 49 and injured 216.
- April 4 - First batch of vaccines from COVAX arrive in Taiwan.
- 6 April - IMF reevaluates Taiwan's GDP forecast from 1.5% to 4.7%.
- 7 April - MOFA minister accepts copy of credentials from Belize ambassador Candice Pitts.
- 8 April - An agricultural internship program between Taiwan and the Philippines is launched.
- 9 April
  - 2021 Dajia Matsu Pilgrimage Procession.
  - United States announces new guidelines for government contacts with Taiwan to reflect deepening unofficial relations.
  - Formosa Club in West Asia is launched.
  - 80th anniversary of Taiwan-Honduras diplomatic ties.
- 10 April
  - Annual traditional market festival.
  - Man is run over by Puyuma Express train, found dead.
- 12 April
  - Mayors of Taoyuan, Taipei, New Taipei, and Taichung are vaccinated.
  - HFX controversy over whether to award John McCain Prize to Tsai Ing-wen and risk provoking Beijing.
- 13 April
  - Regarding to the Japan cabinet's decision to dump radioactive water of the Fukushima nuclear plant into the Pacific Ocean, Taiwan's Foreign Ministry expressed concern and the Atomic Energy Council expressed strong opposition.
  - First indigenous Amphibious transport dock, Yu Shan, is launched.
  - Seafarers Act amended to include waters known for piracy, not just warzones.
  - Travel bubble between Palau and Taiwan (from 1 April) canceled due to low demand.
  - Renovated historic site, the Keelung Fort Commander's Official Residence, opens.
  - April 14
  - Arrival of a bipartisan American delegation.
  - Ordnance found on Kinmen.
- April 15
  - Amendments to foreign professional recruitment law passed (less requirements, tax breaks, etc.)
  - US delegation sent by Biden meets with President Tsai.
  - Anti-corruption workshop between IB and IRS.
- April 16
  - CPC Corporation will begin to drill for water, amidst drought/water shortage.
- April 16 - April 17 - Live fire exercise between many military branches.
- April 17 - Travelers from Taiwan who present proof of negative coronavirus tests from select hospitals will be exempt from Hawaii's quarantine.
- April 18
  - Body of missing pilot (March 22) found.
  - Matzu procession (April 9) ends.
  - Taiwan wins bid from TWIF to host 2026 World Indoor Tug of War Championships.
  - Two relatively large earthquakes in Taiwan (5.8 and 6.2).
- April 19
  - National Center of Photography and Images (NCPI) opens in Taipei.
  - Taiwanese weightlifter Kuo Hsing-chun wins three gold medals and sets new records for the 59 kg category.
  - April 19 - Reservations for self-pad coronavirus vaccination available.
- April 20
  - Taiwan Solidarity Act introduced in the United States' congress.
  - Despite need of vaccines, Paraguay does not end diplomatic ties with Taiwan for China.
  - Tainan joins Kaohsiung and Hsinchu and closes swimming pools, car washes, and other things that require much water to preserve water during the drought.
  - Greenpeace urges the Environmental Protection Administration to go carbon neutral by 2050 and have a carbon price of US$35 per Tonne.
  - Candice Pitts presents credentials to Tsai Ing-wen, the 32nd anniversary of Belize-Taiwan official diplomatic relations.
  - Zengwen Reservoir, the largest in Taiwan (by volume) is at less than 11% capacity.
- April 21
  - Amang's Verse novel Raised by Wolves: Poems and Conversations is awarded the annual prize by PEN America.
  - High-speed ferry between Anping Harbor and outlying islands of Penghu launched, used to transport tourist and food.
  - April 21 - Self-paid COVID vaccines for public planning to travel abroad.
- April 22
  - Quanta Computers cyber-attacked with Apple.
  - S&P Global Ratings changes Taiwan's credit rating from AA− to AA.
- April 23
  - Digital Han Kuang Exercise
  - MOF and CABEI agree on establishment of regional office in Taiwan.
- April 24 - Taiwan's 12th COVID-19 fatality, a man in his 70s.
- April 27 - United Kingdom confirms cooperation in automatic exchange of financial account information and tax matters annually on September.
- April 28
  - TSMC listed on Time magazine's inaugural list of "100 Most Influential Companies" under the category "Titan".
  - Taiwan and U.S. signs Patriot III inspection deal.
- April 29 - Diplomatic training cooperation agreement with Saint Lucia inked.
- April 30 - Delfina Foundation selects two Taiwanese artists for 2021 resident artists.
- April (New Taipei City) - Cloud Gate tour in Taiwan.

=== May ===
- May 1 - Labor Day protest to raise minimum wage, increase pay for teachers, civil servants, employees of state-run enterprises, and fix pension issues.
- May 2
  - Taiwan donates 150 oxygen concentrators and 500 oxygen cylinders to India, India has had 400,000 New cases daily.
  - Taiwan begins centralized quarantine system for people traveling from/through India due to a large amount of cases in late April-early May.
  - Maokong Gondola offers NT$50 rides to all Taiwan residents.
- May 4
  - Taiwan military implements electronic warfare countermeasures.
  - Hong Kong imports 136x Taiwanese pineapples after China bans it.
  - Ministry of Finance will now allow people to file taxes through mobile devices.
  - CYBERSEC 2021
  - Cloud Gate performs at NTU during the university's art festival.
  - President Tsai Ing-wen awarded John McCain Prize (April 12).
- May 5 – 15 cryogenic ISO tanks donated to India.
- May 6 - Le Grand Cirque performs in Taipei.
- May 7
  - 2021 Europe Festival at Huashan Creative Park
  - Indigenous groups lose an eight-year legal battle on hunting rights with the government.
  - French Senate passes resolution to support Taiwan's international participation.
- May 8 - 2021 Europe Festival opens at Huashan Creative Park.
- May 8–9 (Taoyuan) - Cloud Gate tour in Taiwan.
- May 10
  - Criminal Investigation Bureau arresting 20 alleged money mules.
  - 783 invasive catfish (Amazon sailfin) 666 other invasive fish, and 1 native carp removed from Bihu lake in Neihu.
  - Czech Art in Taiepi exhibition.
- May 12 - Foreign Ministers Wu and Brolo video call.
- May 15 - COVID-19 alert level raised to 3 in Taipei and New Taipei.
- May 15–16 (Changhua), May 22–23 (Chiayi), May 29–30 (Tainan), June 5–6 (Hualien), June 12–13 (Pingtung) - Cloud Gate tour in Taiwan.
- May 17
  - Spike in COVID-19 cases raises alarm and forces the Taiwanese government to impose its toughest social restrictions in order to curb the rising infection rate.
  - Formosa Club in the Caribbean launched.
- May 18
  - Kaohsiung imposes restrictions similar to Level 3 epidemic alert.
  - Soldiers disinfect Taipei Metro
  - Most reservoirs in central and southern Taiwan at less than 10% capacity.
  - CECC denies Kinmen County Commissioner Yang Cheng-wu’s request for permission to purchase COVID-19 vaccines from China.
  - 240 cases and 2 reported deaths from COVID-19.
  - 37 Taiwanese students test positive for COVID-19.
  - The legislative committee responsible for constitutional amendments holds its first meeting.
  - Taiwan Depository & Clearing Corporation, Taiwan's central securities depository, issues statement for all companies listed on the TWSE, TPEx, and ESB to comply with pandemic restrictions and recommends having shareholder meetings online.
  - GCTF meeting with the United States, Japan, UK, Australia.
- May 19
  - Migrant workers banned from entry due to COVID-19 surge.
  - Executive Yuan introduces contact tracing text messaging service.
- May 19 - June 18 - Border control tightens amid COVID-19 case spikes, visa application processing and entry of foreign nationals will be paused. Exceptions will be made on a case-by-case basis.
- May 19–28 - All schools in Taiwan switch to virtual/distance learning.
- May 20
  - Rouday Stanley Penn, ambassador of Haiti to Taiwan gives copy of credentials to Foreign Minister Wu.
  - National Palace Museum entries at WorldFest Houston film festival win 26 Remi awards.
- May 21
  - 13 of Taiwan's 15 diplomatic allies have made appeals to the World Health Organization calling for the country's participation in the WHO as an observer.
  - Blood supplies are the lowest in 20 years, with blood banks reporting an average of 4.4 days of stock, according to the Taiwan Blood Services Foundation.
  - Taiwan reports 312 local COVID-19 cases.
- May 22–23 (Chiayi) - Cloud Gate tour in Taiwan.
- May 24 - Two indigenous artisans recognized as 'Important Traditional Crafts' preservers.
- May 25 - 7th Taiwan-Estonia Economic Cooperation conference.
- May 27 - 2nd Taiwan-Croatia Economic Cooperation Videoconference.

New relief package amid latest COVID-19 wave.

- May 28
  - 297 local cases, 258 retroactive cases, and 19 new COVID-19 fatalities, bringing the total up to 78.
  - Yuanta Financial Holdings, Cathay Financial Holdings, Taishin Financial Holdings, and Fubon Financial have pledged NT$160 million, NT$40 million, NT$30 million, and NT$23 million, respectively to support medical workers and fight COVID-19.
  - Heat alerts issued in 18 cities and counties, forecasted to reach up to 38 degrees.
  - Frequency of MRT trains reduced, up to twice more waiting time and disinfecting.
  - Visa extension for foreigners.
  - Kinmen decides not to enter COVID lockdown.
  - First batch of Moderna Vaccines arrive in Taiwan, 150,000 doses.
  - Taiwan and Guatemala sign the Mutual Recognition Arrangement on Authorized Economic Operator.
- May 29 - TECO in Sydney and Sydney Opera House hold contemporary art project.

May 29–30 (Tainan) - Cloud Gate tour in Taiwan.

- May 30 - Citywide drill on level 4 COVID-19 precautions in Taipei.
- 31 May - 30 June - Computex (virtually)

=== June ===
- June 1 - Illustrator Lin Lian-en wins the BolognaRagazzi Award in the fiction category.
- June 3
  - New relief package amid latest COVID-19 wave.
  - Foreign Correspondent's Club of Japan.
- June 4
  - Ministry of the Interior announces that landlords may be fined of up to NT$150,000 (US$5,417) for evicting tenants for COVID-19-related reasons.
  - Japan donates 1.24 million doses of AstraZeneca COVID-19 vaccines to Taiwan.
  - Taipei 101 displays "台灣❤️日本" (Taiwan❤️Japan) thanking Japan's vaccine donation.
  - Taiwan passes 10,000 total COVID-19 cases.
- June 15 FoundOcean secures major contract to build offshore wind farm.
- June 16–28 Chinese military aircraft enter Taiwanese airspace.
- June 23
  - Lithuania announces donation of 20,000 AstraZeneca vaccine doses to Taiwan.
  - All 13 issues listed in the 2020 Taiwan White Paper by the American Chamber of Commerce are completely resolved, a record in the 25-year history of the paper.
- June 24
  - Taiwanese film "Synapses" (Directed by Chang Tso-chi wins Best Film Award at the 18th edition Asian Film Festival which took place at the Cinema Farnese in Rome, Italy, from June 17 through 23.
  - Port of Kaohsiung Wins International Association of Ports and Harbors (IAPH) 2021 Award for Best Resilient Physical Infrastructure in World Ports Sustainability Program Awards.
  - Level 3 COVID-19 alert is given a 2-week extension to July 12.
- June 25 - The Coast Guard receives a new corvette, the Chenggong (成功艦), the second Anping class with the hull number of CG-602.
- June 26
  - Taiwan confirms first local case of the Delta COVID variant in Pintung.
  - CECC confirms 78 new local cases and 13 deaths.
  - Half of Fangshan Township in Pingtung County enters "semi-Level 4" lockdown.
  - The Chinese Professional Baseball League postpones plans to begin fanless games on June 29, mainly due to the Delta variant.
- June 27
  - CECC confirms 89 new cases (1 imported, 88 domestic) and 9 deaths.
  - Southern Taiwan tries to quickly vaccinate as Delta variant spreads.

=== September ===
- September 13 – Han Kuang exercises begin.
- September 25 – Eric Chu wins 2021 Kuomintang chairmanship election.

=== October ===
- October 14 – 2021 Kaohsiung building fire
- October 23 – Legislator Chen Po-wei recalled from office.

=== December ===
- December 10 - Official bilateral relations between Nicaragua and Taiwan end.
- December 18 - A referendum was held, and all four proposals were rejected.

== Predicted and scheduled events ==
- Public holidays in Taiwan
- May 22 - November 21, 17th International Architecture Exhibition.
- June 25 - The exhibit Monet and Friends begins.
- June 30, Trade and Investment Framework Agreement (TIFA) talks with the United States.
- October 30 - 2021 Asia Art Biennial with the theme of "Phantasmapolis".
- April (New Taipei City), May 8–9 (Taoyuan), May 15–16 (Changhua), May 22–23 (Chiayi), May 29–30 (Tainan), June 5–6 (Hualien), June 12–13 (Pingtung) - Cloud Gate tour in Taiwan

=== Date unknown ===
- February – June - Taiwan will receive 1,303,200 AstraZeneca vaccine doses as a non U.N. member state from the COVAX program.
- May - Moderna will begin delivering 5.5 million doses of COVID-19 vaccine to Taiwan.
- June - Second AZ vaccine shipment through COVAX.
- End of June - U.S. will send 20 million vaccines by the end of June.
- July - Taiwanese developed COVID vaccine rollout.
- Taiwan moves to ban all single use utensils for customers dining on the premises.
- Multipurpose facility for Far Eastern Group will be designed by Santiago Calatrava.
- 2021 Taiwan Literature Award.
- United States may have first military arms sale with Taiwan.
- Dancing Dandelion.

== Deaths ==
- 9 January – Rong Zi, 98, Chinese-born Taiwanese writer and poet.
- 5 March – Chuang Ling-yun, 21, Taiwanese singer and actress, suicide by jumping.
- 22 March
  - Lo Shang-hua
  - Pan Ying-chun
- 31 March – Hsu Shui-teh, 89, Taiwanese politician, Mayor of Kaohsiung (1982–1985), Taipei (1985–1988), and President of the Examination Yuan (1996-2002), pneumonia.
- 5 April – Luo Ying-shay, 69, Taiwanese politician, Minister of Justice (2013–2016).
- 17 April – Hsu Sheng-fa, 96, Taiwanese automotive executive (Prince Motors) and politician, MLY (1981–1990)
- 1 May – Kuan Yun-loong, 92, Taiwanese writer.
- 26 May – Sze-Piao Yang, 100, Taiwanese pulmonologist.
- 14 June – Wang Chiu-Hwa, 95, Taiwanese architect.
- 16 June – Chou Ching-chun, 77, Taiwanese activist and politician, president of the Patriot Alliance Association (since 2018).
- 21 June – Mei Xun, Taiwanese writer.
- 7 July – Kuo Jung-cheng, 71, Taiwanese politician, MLY (1999–2002), liver cancer.
- 30 August – Wang Kuang-hui, 56, Taiwanese baseball player (Brother Elephants) and coach, liver cancer.
- 14 September – Lung Shao-hua, 68, Taiwanese actor.
- 25 September – Elmer Fung, 73, Taiwanese politician, MLY (1999–2002), cancer.
- 8 October – Chang Yung-hsiang, 91, Taiwanese screenwriter.
- 22 October – Ju Gau-jeng, 67, Taiwanese politician, MLY (1987–1999).
- 30 October – Francisco Ou, 81, Taiwanese diplomat, Minister of Foreign Affairs (2008–2009).
- 31 October – Chang Kuo-tung, 92, Taiwanese actor.
- 3 November – Tang Yao-ming, 80, Taiwanese military officer, Minister of National Defense (2002–2004).
- 11 November – Lee Ying-yuan, 68, Taiwanese politician, member of the Legislative Yuan (1996–2000, 2012–2016), carcinoma of the ampulla of Vater.
- 12 December – Nai-Ni Chen, 62, Taiwanese-American dancer and choreographer.
- 17 December – Chen Sung-young, 80, Taiwanese actor.

== See also ==
- Water supply and sanitation in Taiwan
- Cross-Strait relations
- Political status of Taiwan
- China–United States relations
- Taiwan–United States relations
- China
- Inter-Parliamentary Alliance on China
