= Taiwanese literature =

Taiwanese literature refers to the literature written by Taiwanese in any language ever used in Taiwan, including Japanese, Taiwanese Han (Hokkien, Hakka and Mandarin) and Austronesian languages.

== Novels, short stories, and poetry ==
Taiwan has a very active literary scene, with a large number of writers of novels and (especially) short stories enjoying a wide readership, many of them for many decades running. A short selection of prominent writers and poets includes:

- Wang K'ai-yün (1889–1969)
- Wu Zhuoliu (1900–1976)
- Bo Yang (1920–2008)
- Yao Yi-Wei (1922–1997)
- Chen Min-hwa (1934–)
- Huang Chun-ming (1935–)
- Pai Hsien-yung (1937–)
- Chen Ruoxi (1938–)
- Wang Wen-hsing (1939–2023)
- Yang Mu (1940–2020)
- San Mao (1943–1991)
- Lung Ying-tai (1952–)
- Qiu Fengjia (1864–1912)
- Loa Ho (1894–1943)
- John Ching Hsiung Wu (1899–1986)
- Chou Meng-tieh (1921–2014)
- William Marr (1936–)
- Li Kuei-Hsien (1937–)
- Wai-lim Yip (1937–)
- Xi Murong (1943–)
- Wu He (1951–)
- Lin Yang-min (1955–)
- Luo Yijun (1967–)
- Hou Wen-yong (1962–)
- Li Bi-chhin (1979–)

See the full list of Taiwanese writers.

Similarly, there is a large poetry community in Taiwan, and there have been several anthologies of Taiwanese poetry in English translation. The New Century New Generation Poetry Selection, edited by Taiwanese poets Xiang Yang (Poet), targets the millennials poets (born between 1980 and 1999, active from 2000 to 2022) who created modern poetry in Taiwan. It includes 52 poets such as Liao Chi-Yu, Yang Chih-Chieh, Hsu Pei-Fen, and Lin Yu-hsuan.

Two areas of cross-pollination between literature and other arts in Taiwan include modern dance (particularly the modern dance troupe Cloud Gate Dance Theater, founded and directed by author Lin Huai-min) and filmmaking (including productions of stories by Huang Chunming directed by the leading Taiwanese filmmaker Hou Hsiao-hsien).

The 1990s saw the rise of a nativist Taiwan literature movement.

More recently, Taiwan literature has also been included in Sinophone literature and world literature.

== Literature relating to politics ==
With the establishment of the People's Republic of China in 1949, books from the PRC were not often published in Taiwan and books from Taiwan were not often published in the PRC. In 1986, the first novel, Three Kings, written by a mainland Chinese writer, Ah Cheng, was openly published as such in Taiwan.

Some books from China still found their way into Taiwan before 1986 by different ways. As pirate editions, under both a different title and a pseudonym for the author, under a different title, but with the author's name unchanged, under a pseudonym but with the title unchanged, or altered by changes in the text itself.

== Literary awards ==
The awards for Taiwanese literature include Taiwan Literature Award (presented by National Museum of Taiwan Literature), Wu San-lien Literary Award (Wu San-Lien Award Foundation), Aboriginal Literature Award, and Min-Hakka Literary Award (both by the Ministry of Education of Taiwan).

== Museums ==
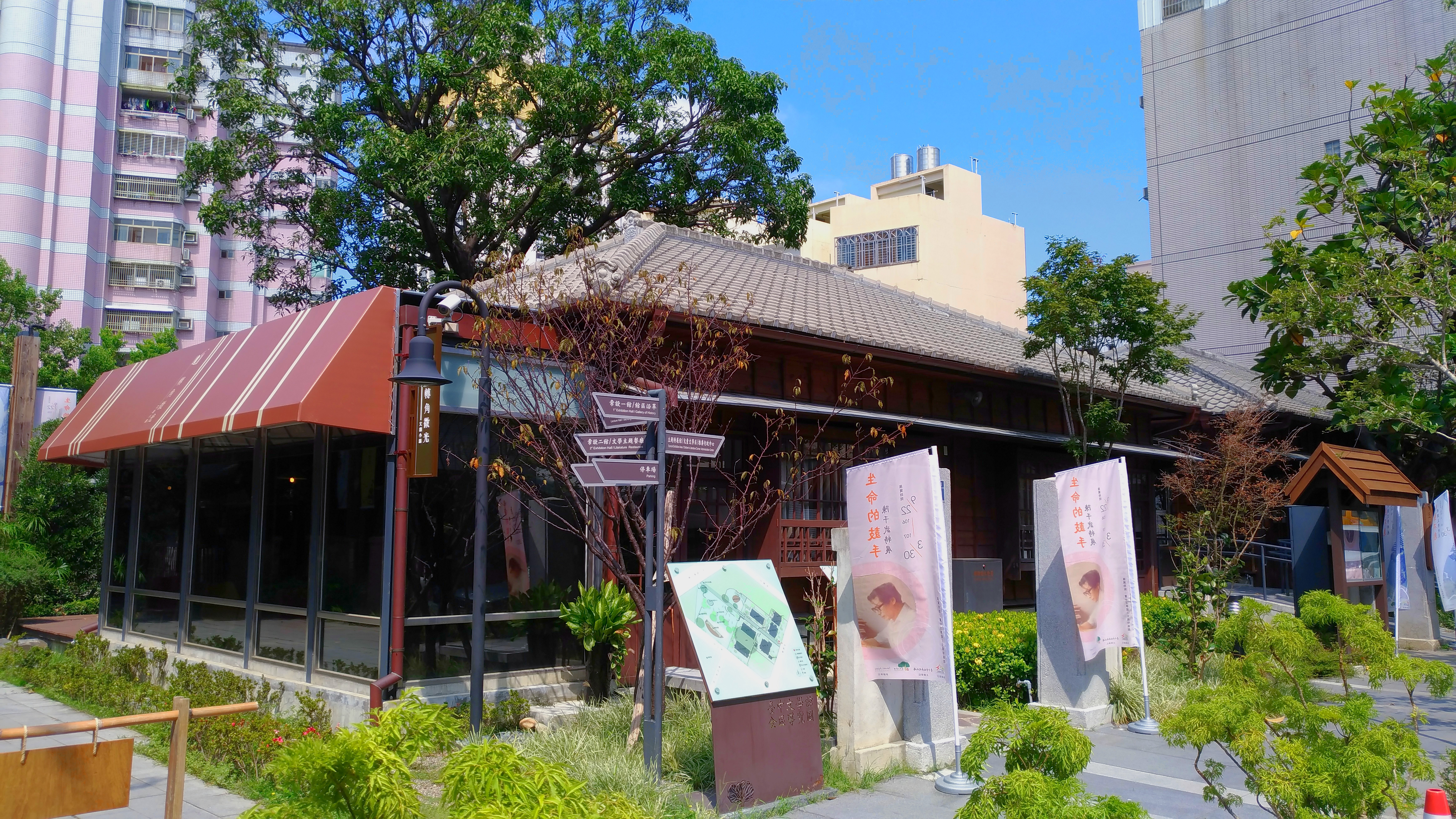
Taichung Literature Museum

- National Museum of Taiwan Literature
- Lee Rong-chun Literary Museum
- Taichung Literature Museum
- Yang Kui Literature Memorial Museum
- Yeh Shih-tao Literature Memorial Hall
- Yilan Literary Museum

== See also ==
- Taiwan nativist literature
- Saline Land
- Culture of Taiwan
- Chinese culture
- List of Taiwanese writers
- Chinese poetry by Taiwanese-Japanese
