= Chen Min-hwa =

Taiwanese poet

- 陳敏華
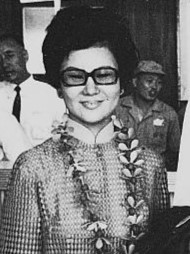
- Chen Min-hwa (photographed in the Philippines in 1969)
- Born: September 7, 1934 (age 92); Huangxian, Shandong, China
- Education: Providence University
- Occupations: poet and television presenter
- Spouse: Zhang Shaozai
- Writing career
- Period: 1960s–1970s
- Genre: Modern Chinese poetry
- Notable awards: Chinese Arts and Literature Award (1971)
- Movement: Vineyard Poetry Society

Chinese name
- Traditional Chinese: 陳敏華
Transcriptions
Standard Mandarin
- Hanyu Pinyin: Chén Mǐnhuá

Chen Min-hwa (Chinese: 陳敏華; pinyin: Chén Mǐnhuá; born 7 September 1934) is a Taiwanese poet and television presenter known as the "Crystal Poetess". She is one of the founders of the Vineyard Poetry Society and was nominated for the Nobel Prize in Literature in 1974, becoming the first female Chinese author to be nominated.

== Biography ==
=== Early life ===
Chen was born on 7 September 1934 in Huangxian, Shandong, China. In 1949, she went to Taiwan due to the Chinese Civil War. After graduating at Providence University, she eventually hosted the "Literary Showcase" program of Education Radio and the "Literary Salon" program of Taiwan Television for several years.

=== Literary career ===
In April 1962, after graduating from the "New Poetry Research Class" sponsored by the Chinese Literature and Art Association, she cofounded the literary club "Vineyard Poetry Society" with Wang Zaijun, Gu Ding, Wen Xiaocun, Li Peizheng, Song Houying and others (all of whom were students of the research class). The club was located in her home in the Yonghe District. On July 15 of the same year, the Vineyard Poetry Society issued the quarterly Vineyard. The magazine called for "all poets who are isolated from society and readers to wake up early, bravely abandon nihilism, obscurity and weirdness, and return to reality, return to clarity, and create poems with flesh and blood." It advocated the popularization of poetry and adhered to the principle of "health, clarity and China". The "Vineyard Poetry Society" thus laid the foundation for the transformation of contemporary Taiwanese poetry creation from "Westernized" modernism to "local" realism.

In 1965, Chen was elected as the president of the Vineyard Poetry Society succeeding Li Peizheng. On 25 August 1969, Chen together with Ji Xian, Zhong Dingwen, Lin Lu, Luo Men, Rong Zi and Lu Di represented Taiwan at the "1st World Congress of Poets" in Manila, Philippines. Chen eventually won a commemorative gold medal at the conference. In 1975, she left the poetry world and went to Costa Rica to study Spanish for several years. In the 1980s, she moved to Redwood City in the San Francisco Bay Area, California and participated in the establishment of the Chinese cultural organization "Chinese Art Society" in the said Bay Area, and served as its president and consultant. As of March 2024, Chen is the honorary president of the Chinese Art Society.

==== Poetry ====
Most of Chen's works are poetry that pursue the realm of "beauty" and describe the scenery by combining the real and the imaginary, borrowing the subject to express ideas. Zhong Dingwen believes that Chen's poetry has a kind of "modest reserve".

Chen's published poetry collections include Daisy (1967), Through the Crystal Glass (1970), Qin Window Poetry Collection (1971), and As Dawn Whistles Over the Sea (1973), embodying strong sense of female self-consciousness. In the poem Daisy, she compares women to a small flower, which, although it only "owns a small piece of heaven and earth" and "has not produced mature fruits", has "roots that expand the universe" and is "beautiful and abundant". The poem as follows:

《雏菊》

Daisy

有什么可悲的呢
你本可以挺起胸膛,昂立于
无所不容的蓝天之下

What's so sad about it?
You could have held your head high and stood tall
Under the all-embracing blue sky.

在此广阔的世界
你也拥有一小片天地
清风雨露里,枝叶如意舒展

In this vast world,
You also have a small piece of heaven and earth
In the breeze, rain and dew, the branches and leaves stretch out as they wish.

开出朵朵小花如莲心
圆而纯白,美而丰盈
当众花枯瘦,秋已飘零

The small flowers bloom like lotus seeds
Round and pure white, beautiful and full,
When the flowers wither, autumn has already passed.

有什么可悲哀呢
阳光如此博爱,润泥情深
虽然没结下成熟的果实
但你却有扩展宇宙的根

What is there to be sad about?
The sun is so kind, it moistens the mud with deep affection
Although it has not produced mature fruits
But you have the roots to expand the universe.

Her poems have rarely been selected for poetry anthologies other than the Vineyard Anthology. This is due to her straightforward style, in which the lyricism is too explicit, and the overall superficiality is related. In addition, although Chen is a feminist poet, some of her poems are considered by some scholars to be praising the center of patriarchal order. Her poems also reflects the spirit of traditional Chinese culture, profoundly and implicitly expressing the glory and continuity of traditional Chinese culture, and describes the lives of the local poor in Taiwan.

Since most Taiwanese female writers in the mid-20th century wrote novels and essays, Chen belongs to a group of pioneers of Taiwanese female poetry that includes Rong Zi, Chen Xiuxi, Fangge Dupan and Chang Hsiu-ya. These poets all adopted the form of modern poetry to express their feminine consciousness, proving that true feminist poetry as a group has emerged in Greater China.

== Honors ==
Chen has won awards such as the Asian Outstanding Poet Award, the 60th Annual Literature Award of the Ministry of Education and Culture, and the 12th Literature and Poetry Creation Award of the 12th Chinese Literary and Art Association. In December 1969, upon the recommendation of the United Poets Laureates International, the British International College awarded Chen an honorary master of arts degree.

Although Chen has won many awards including the "Poet Goddess Award" from the International Poets Conference, she has been attacked by some literary groups due to the deep prejudices among the different schools of thought in the Taiwanese poetry world. In response, Wen Xiaocun of the Vineyard Poetry Society wrote an article criticizing:

"Why can't our poetry world work together to expand the Chinese poetry movement under the principle of letting a hundred flowers bloom and a myriad of colors bloom, or the principle of seeking common ground in differences and seeking common ground in differences?"

In 2025, after the Swedish Academy revealed the official nominations list in 1974 kept secret for 50 years, Chen was included on the recommendation of Emeterio Barcelón y Barceló-Soriano, president of the Philippine Academy of the Spanish Language. She became the first Chinese female writer to be nominated for such an honor.

== Publications ==
- Daisy [雏菊], 1967.
- Through the Crystal Glass [水晶集], (Taipei: Grape Garden Magazine, 1970 and 1972).
- Qin Window Poetry Collection [琴窗诗抄] (Taipei: San Min Book Company, 1971 and 1979). ISBN 9789571415239
- As Dawn Whistles Over the Sea [星海的风笛], (Taipei: Grape Garden Magazine, 1973).
