= Cafe Astoria =

First Western-style bakery in Taiwan

Cafe Astoria 明星咖啡館
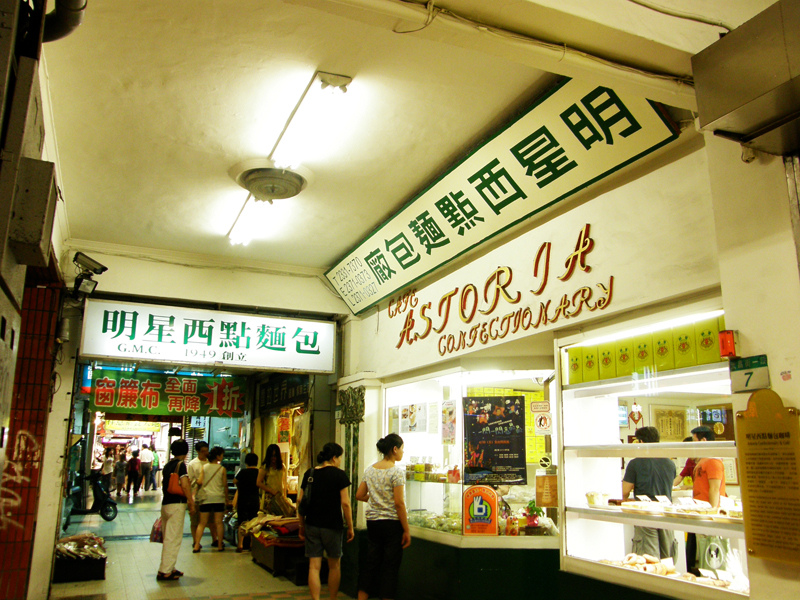
- Interactive map of Cafe Astoria 明星咖啡館

Restaurant information
- Established: October 1949; 76 years ago
- Owner: Archibald Chien
- Food type: Pastries
- Location: No. 7, Wuchang Street, Section 1, Taipei, Taiwan
- Coordinates: 25°2′38.84″N 121°30′45.73″E
- Website: www.astoria.com.tw

The Cafe Astoria (Chinese: 明星咖啡館; pinyin: Míngxīng kāfēi guǎn) is the first Western-style bakery in Taiwan. It is located in the Zhongzheng District of Taipei, Taiwan, on Wuchang Street across from the City God Temple.

== History ==
In October 1949, 18-year-old Archibald Chien became business partners with six Russian immigrants who fled Shanghai to Taiwan. Together they opened Taipei's first Western style pastry shop on Wuchang Street in downtown Taipei. They offered pastries on the first floor and a cafe on the second floor. One month after the Astoria opened for business, Chiang Kai-shek resumed presidency of the Republic of China and relocated his government to Taiwan. After the Korean War broke out in 1950, the United States maintained a significant troop presence on Taiwan. During this time, the Astoria hosted many important guests from abroad, including Jane Fonda. The cafe was also frequently visited by Chiang Ching-Kuo – who had studied in Moscow for many years – and his Belarusian wife Chiang Fang-liang. In 1950, Astoria hosted a Russian New Year Celebration which was attended by Chiang Ching-Kuo and his family. Chiang Kai-shek's last birthday cake was also prepared by chefs from the Astoria. After World War II, the Cafe Astoria became a popular spot for many socialites and government officials. It was also a spot where many struggling writers and intellectuals met and composed their works. Famous writers, poets and artists known to have frequented the Astoria include Pai Hsien-yung, Chou Meng-tieh, Yu Guangzhong, and choreographer Lin Hwai-min.

In 2011, the Taipei City Government designated the Cafe Astoria as a historic building.

== Transportation ==
The cafe is accessible within walking distance north east of Ximen Station of Taipei Metro.

== See also ==
- List of Taiwanese writers
- History of Taiwan
