= Epoch Poetry Society =

The Epoch Poetry Society (Chinese: 創世紀詩社) is the largest and longest-running literary group for modern poetry in Taiwan, and it is still operating today. Co-founded by the Epoch Poetry Trio poets Chang Mo (張默), Luo Fu (洛夫), and Ya Hsien (瘂弦) in 1954 in Taiwan, the poetry society was initiated in the military, and its early members and organization had a distinct military style. In the 1960s, the Epoch Poetry Society became a hub for surrealism in the Taiwanese poetry scene, having a far-reaching influence on the promotion of modern poetry in Taiwan.

== History ==
The society operates through the publication of The Epoch Poetry Quarterly, and its activities can be divided into four stages.

In the first stage, the content of the publication prioritizes imagery and conception, emphasizing Chinese and Oriental style. It also kept a balance between the horizontal transplantation of Western modernist poetry proposed by Taiwanese modernists and the continuation of the culture in Chinese traditional verse advocated by the Blue Star Poetry Society.

In the second stage, they turned to modernism and began to advocate "surrealism", initiating discussions on the form and content of poetry through the analysis and explanation of translations of foreign poems. It proposed the "globality", "surrealism", "originality", and "purity" of poetry.

In the third stage, which coincided with Taiwan's withdrawal from the United Nations and the Defend the Tiaoyutai Islands movement, the Taiwanese literary community criticized the over-westernization of modern poetry writing at that time, sparking discussions on the style of modern poetry writing. The poetry society responded that they opposed realism and reiterated their perspective on modernist aesthetics.

In the fourth stage, spanning from the 1980s to the 1990s, when martial law was lifted and cross-strait exchanges increased, Taiwanese society gradually became more diverse, and the Epoch Poetry Society started various conversations at home and abroad.
