= Orphan of Asia =

Orphan of Asia (Japanese: アジアの孤児) is a Japanese-language novel written by Taiwanese writer Wu Cho-liu at the end of World War II, completed in 1945. It was initially published as "Hu Chih-ming", after the novel's protagonist's name, in 1946 but since the name was the same as the Vietnamese leader Ho Chi Minh's name as read in Chinese, the protagonist's name was changed to Hu Tai-ming and the title was also changed when it was republished in 1952. This work is considered a significant piece in the history of Taiwanese literature, as Wu Cho-liu wrote it while living in Japanese-ruled Taiwan, facing the constant surveillance of the Japanese police, risking his life.

== Plot ==
The novel tells the story of Hu Tai-ming, a Taiwanese intellectual who struggles with his identity as both Japanese and Chinese. Hu Tai-ming is educated in both traditional Chinese and Japanese schools, and he eventually becomes a schoolteacher. During his tenure as a teacher, he falls in love with a Japanese colleague, facing obstacles from the school and rejection due to racial differences. Experiencing racial discrimination in both emotional and professional aspects, he resigns from his teaching position and decides to study in Japan. However, in Japan, his Taiwanese identity leads to suspicion from Chinese students, who suspect him of being a spy. Subsequently, Hu teaches in Nanking, China, but is arrested by the police due to his Taiwanese identity. The novel concludes with Hu returning to Taiwan, profoundly affected by the extreme policies implemented by the Japanese government during the war, ultimately leading to his collapse.

== Reception ==
Taiwanese writer Yeh Shih-tao has said that Wu Cho-liu's Orphan of Asia "captures all aspects of Taiwanese society, and reveals the sorrows and joys of Taiwanese people, as well as their tortuous fate. It also has a rich local color and points to the Taiwanese people's will, the path they should take, and their future fate." The novel is a powerful depiction of the sense of alienation and despair felt by Taiwanese youth under Japanese colonial rule. It also reveals the complex and tragic history of Taiwan.

Taiwanese scholar Chen Wan-yi (陳萬益) has said that the novel, through the experiences of the protagonist Hu Tai-ming, vividly depicts the sense of isolation felt by Taiwanese people during the Japanese ruling period who were caught between Japan and China.

== See also ==
- Wu Cho-liu
