= Fangge Dupan =

Taiwanese poet (1927–2016)

- 杜潘芳格
- Born: 9 March 1927; Xinpu, Hsinchu County
- Died: 10 March 2016 (aged 89)
- Education: National Hsinchu Girls' Senior High School
- Occupation: Writer

Fangge Dupan (Chinese: 杜潘芳格; pinyin: Dùpān Fānggé; Wade–Giles: Tu P'an Fang-kê; 9 March 1927 – 10 March 2016) was a Taiwanese poet of Hakka descent, renowned as a member of the "generation that straddles between (Japanese and Chinese) languages." Born to a prestigious Hakka family in Xinpu, Hsinchu, she began writing as a teenager in high school. Most of her early work is written in Japanese because she was educated in that language. Due to political pressure, she stopped writing in Japanese and did not publish until the 1960s, in Mandarin. In 1965, she joined the Li Poetry Society with a strong emphasis on the sense of place, and in the 1980s she began actively creating Hakka poetry. In the late 1980s, Fangge Dupan turned to her native Hakka language.

Her main works are Ghost Festival (中元節), PinAn Drama (平安戲), Paper Man (紙人), and Vegetable Garden (菜園).

== Life and career ==
Fangge Dupan's family was a prestigious family in Xinpu, Hsinchu. Her grandfather, Pan Cheng-chien, was chief of the village during the Japanese colonial period. Her father, Pan Chin-wei, studied law in Tokyo. Her mother, a native of Kansai, Hsinchu, was adopted and attended Third Taipei Girl's High School. Fangge Dupan's background influenced her writing greatly.

Fangge Dupan was born in Xinpu, Hsinchu on 9 March 1927. She had three younger sisters and three younger brothers. The family moved to Japan with her father soon after she was born and returned to Taiwan in 1934. Due to her background, she was able to enter the "elite primary school", normally for Japanese, for aristocratic education. There, she was bullied by Japanese schoolmates. Fangge began attending National Hsinchu Girls' Senior High School in 1940, where she continued to face bullies. She attempted to get along with her Japanese classmates, and started writing in Japanese, including poems, novels and prose.

After leaving Hsinchu, Fangge Dupan enrolled in Taipei Girls Senior High School. At school for two years, the classes included domestic arts such as: ikebana, the tea ceremony, sewing and knitting, as well as literature and history. As a whole, Taipei Girls Senior High School's educational mission was to develop humble, virtuous women to serve husbands and educate children. What she learned in Taipei inspired Fangge Dupan to ponder the status of women, which became a recurring theme in her writings. After World War II, she returned to Xinpu to teach junior high school. There, she met her future husband, Dr. Du Ching-shou. By 1946, Fangge Dupan stopped writing in Japanese because the Kuomintang had banned the use of that language. In the 1947 228 Incident, her maternal uncle Chang Chi-liang, and two other people were killed by the Kuomintang. The loss of family members affected Fangge Dupan's work deeply; she expressed an ironic attitude towards politics in her work. The next year, Fangge Dupan married Du despite opposition from her family. She and Du moved to Chungli, Taoyuan. Fangge Dupan worked at her husband's clinic while writing articles as a freelancer. She did not publish under her own name until the 1960s when she began writing in Mandarin. This language shift marks Fangge Dupan as a member of what writer Lin Heng-tai called the "translingual generation" in 1967, Taiwanese writers who were educated in Japanese while Taiwan was governed by Japan, but later published in Mandarin Chinese as the Kuomintang asserted control of Taiwan.

In 1965, Fangge Dupan joined the Li Poetry Society. On 17 September 1967, her husband was badly injured in a car accident, but recovered. Fangge Dupan, a Christian, turned to religious works, and began preaching. In May 1982, Fangge Dupan became an American citizen. She began writing in Hakka in 1989. In 1992, her poem 遠千湖 written in Mandarin, English and Japanese was awarded the first Chen Xiuxi Poetry Prize.

During the 1990s, Fangge Dupan served as the director of Taiwan Literature, as well as the president of the Female Whale Poetry Society. In 1992, she authored a collection of poems titled Faraway Thousand Lake (Yuan Qian Hu) in Beijing Mandarin, English, and Japanese, winning the first Chen Hsiu-hsi Poetry Award. Her major works include Ghost Festival (Zhong Yuan Jie), Well-being Drama (Ping An Xi), Paper Man (Zhi Ren), Vegetable Garden (Cai Yuan), etc.

On 10 March 2016, Fangge Dupan died at home at the age of 89. A memorial was held on 19 March at the Presbyterian Church in Zhongli, where she was posthumously presented with a presidential citation by Hakka Affairs Council minister Chung Wan-mei.

== Style ==
Owing to her family background, Fangge Dupan had the privilege of enrolling in a Shōgakkō (elementary school), at the time it was normally exclusively catered for Japanese children, where most students were of Japanese descent. She began to express herself through Japanese writing as a means of alleviating the torment of being bullied. Since she had learned to think and write in Japanese, it was quite challenging for her to relearn Chinese after World War II.

However, she did not cease her creative endeavors. Instead, she regarded her poems as a form of diary, a means to vent the inner anguish she had no other outlet for. In 1947, the 228 Incident erupted, leading to the arrest and subsequent execution of three of Fangge Dupan's family members by the Kuomintang (KMT) authority. This tragic event deeply affected her, and in her later works, she strongly demonstrated a critical and satirical attitude towards politics.

The Li Poetry Society's poets primarily concentrated on depicting the minutiae of daily life under the influence of the German Neue Sachlichkeit (New Objectivity) movement in the early 1920s. Fangge Dupan's poetry also frequently employs common objects and scenes as symbols. However, the themes she addresses in her work can be profound, encompassing reflections on time, mortality, and the concept of nationhood.
