= Kuan Yun-loong =

Taiwanese artist and writer (1929–2021)

Kuan Yun-loong (Chinese: 管運龍; 27 September 1929 – 1 May 2021) was a Taiwanese painter, poet and writer known by the pen name Guan Guan (管管).

== Biography ==
Kuan was employed as a commercial clerk in the Tzu Chi Private Red 4D Association in Qingdao. During the Chinese Civil War, he was arrested by the National Revolutionary Army at the age of seventeen and forced to enlist in the army. In 1949, he followed the Nationalist Government to Taiwan and served as a reporter for Zuoying Junzhong Radio Station and Hualien Junzhong Radio Program Director.

During his service in Kinmen, he was guided by the poet Ruan Nang from the Blue Star Poetry Society. The publication of the work "The Man with Stars" in the "Blue Star Poetry Magazine" was highly encouraged. Later when he was trained in Fengshan, he met the poets Chang Mo and Ya Hsien, and others. Because he loved the surreal style of modern poetry, he joined Epoch Poetry Magazine and served as the president. Since retiring from the army, he has concentrated on writing and drawing. In addition to the Epoch Poetry Society, Guan Guan also edited "Mercury Poetry Magazine" with Chang Mo. Guan Guan's own poetry featured the Shandong dialect and largely ignored sentence divisions. In 1980, he and Wang Chu-chin were shortlisted for the Golden Horse Award for Best Original Screenplay at the 17th Golden Horse Awards.

On April 30, 2021, Guan Guan was sent to the intensive care unit of the hospital due to a coma after a fall at home. On May 1 of the same year, Guan Guan died in the hospital at the age of 92.
