= Chinese poetry by the Japanese in Taiwan =

Chinese poetry by the Japanese in Taiwan (Chinese: 在臺日人漢詩) refers to the Chinese poems written by Japanese authors in Taiwan between 1895 and 1945, or the Chinese poems related to Taiwan written by these Japanese authors after leaving Taiwan. From these works, one can observe the records of Taiwan's local customs and traditions during the Japanese rule period, as well as writings on travel, colonialism, modernization, the dissemination of political ideas, and the exchange of Chinese literary expressions. Through these poems, a record of Taiwan's history is preserved.

== Scope ==
- Chinese poems written by Japanese authors in Taiwan during the Japanese rule period.
- Chinese poems written by Japanese authors outside of Taiwan during the Japanese rule period, but related to Taiwan.
- Chinese poems published in Taiwanese newspapers and journals during the Japanese rule period, including those published in Taiwan after the author had left Taiwan.
- Chinese poetry collections published in Taiwan during the Japanese rule period.

== Style ==
During the period of Japanese rule over Taiwan from 1895 to 1945, Japanese poets with a background in Chinese literature actively worked or traveled in Taiwan. After coming to Taiwan, they formed their own communities and established new literary circles, collaborating with local Taiwanese literati. Using Chinese as a medium, they engaged in literary exchanges and left behind poetic works. These Japanese poets of Chinese poetry, from a foreign perspective, documented Taiwan's landscapes, customs, food production, and societal changes during that era.

== See also ==
- Taiwanese literature
