= Luo Fu (poet) =

Taiwanese writer and poet

- 莫洛夫
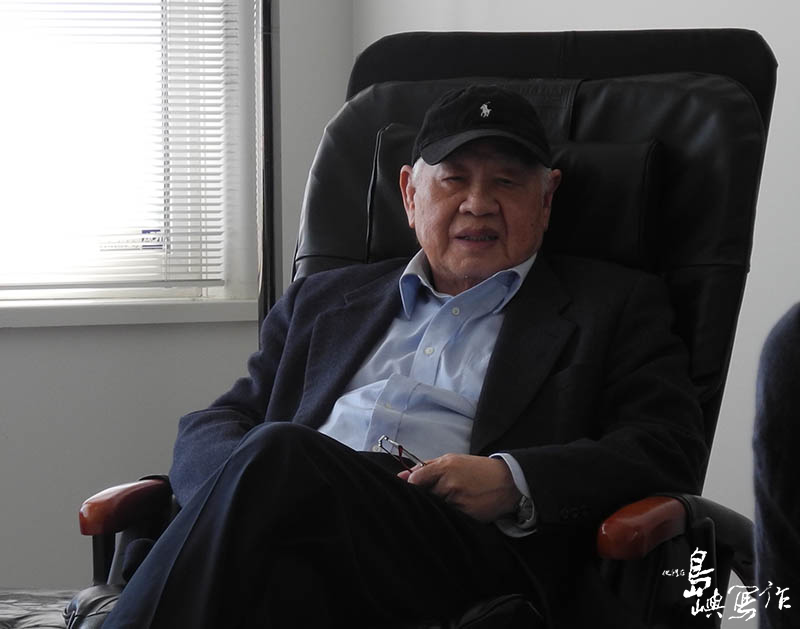
- Luo Fu in 2012
- Born: Mo Yun-tuan (莫運端); 11 May 1928; Hengyang, Hunan, Republic of China
- Died: 19 March 2018 (aged 89); Beitou, Taipei, Taiwan
- Education: Tamkang University (BA)
- Occupation: poet
- Spouse: Chen Chiung-fang
- Writing career
- Pen name: Luo Fu
- Language: Chinese
- Period: 1943–2018

Mo Luo-fu (Chinese: 莫洛夫; pinyin: Mò Luòfū; 11 May 1928 – 19 March 2018), known by the pen name Luo Fu (洛夫; Luòfū), was a Taiwanese writer and poet.

== Early life ==
He was born Mo Yun-tuan in 1928 and raised in Hengyang. Mo's first work was published in 1943. He joined the Republic of China Navy, and moved to Taiwan in 1949. Mo received a bachelor's degree in English from Tamkang University in 1973, the same year he retired from the navy. He married Chen Chiung-fang of Kinmen.

== Career ==
In Taiwan, Mo published several collections of poetry, anthologies, and essays, as well as a number of translations. His own works were translated into several languages. Mo and his contemporary Yu Kwang-chung were described as the Gemini of Chinese poetry, in reference to the constellation depicting the mythological twins Castor and Pollux. Luo Fu founded the Epoch Poetry Society alongside Chang Mo and Ya Hsien in 1954. He later left Taiwan for Canada in 1995. Wang Dan published a collection of poems titled Travel in Cold Alone in 2000, and cited Mo as an influence. Mo's poem "Driftwood" (2000) was nominated for the Nobel Prize for Literature in 2001. His final works were published in January 2018.

== Death ==
In June 2016, Mo was diagnosed with adenocarcinoma of the lung. He died of respiratory complications on 19 March 2018, while seeking treatment at Taipei Veterans General Hospital.
