= Fu Hsing Kang College =

Military academy in Beitou District, Taipei, Taiwan

Fu Hsing Kang College, National Defense University
- 國防大學政治作戰學院
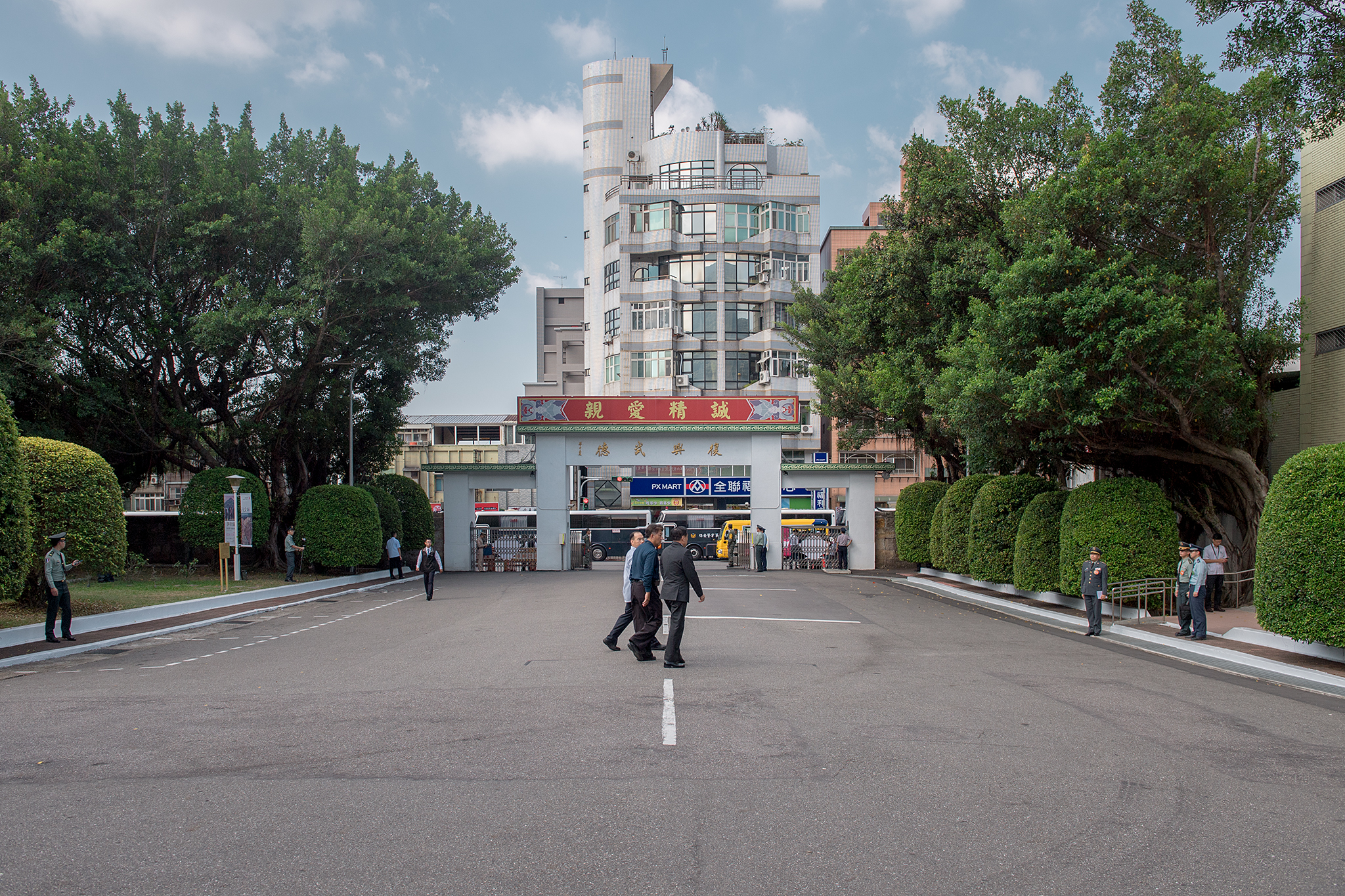
- Type: Military academy
- Established: 1951
- Location: Beitou District, Taipei, Taiwan
- Website: Official website (in English)

The Political Warfare College (Chinese: 政治作戰學校), also known as Fu Hsing Kang College (復興崗, "Renaissance Hill"), is a military academy in Beitou District, Taipei, Taiwan. During the Japanese occupation period, this location was the racetrack of Beitou; after Chiang Ching-kuo's inspection, on July 15, 1951, it became the campus of the formerly known "Political Worker Cadres School".

The College was modelled after the pre-war Moscow Sun Yat-sen University; it was intended to provide the Republic of China Armed Forces with political commissars loyal to the Kuomintang. On 1 September 2006 the College became part of the National Defense University, thereby ceasing to be a stand-alone institution.

After graduating from the college and their commissioning as second lieutenants or ensigns, they serve as platoon leader, counselor, political affairs officer, and psychology officer in the Republic of China Armed Forces. As political warfare officers, they are partly responsible for implementation of state political agenda on national defense matters and thus serve to provide moral, political, and cultural support. There are two graduates who have been promoted to generals. They are Yang Tingyun (Army) in the 1st year graduate and Chen Guoxiang (Marine Corps) in the 19th year graduate.

== History ==
After losing the Chinese Civil War in 1949 President Chiang Kai-shek retreated to Taiwan, and put forward the argument of "three points military, seven points politics". Chiang Ching-kuo was appointed to establish the school.

- 1950 Political Cadre Training Course started
- July 15, 1951 Political Worker Cadres School established
- October 31, 1970 Changed name to Political Warfare Cadres Academy
- July 2006 Stopped Junior College, September 1 Changed name to Political Warfare College under National Defense University

=== Foreign students ===
During the cold war the tuition of Nicaraguan military personnel at the college was subsidized by the World Anti-Communist League, right wing regimes across Latin America sent personnel to the college to learn "counterrevolutionary techniques." According to Le Monde diplomatique the College was "highly reputed for its training in anti-communist warfare."

South Korea sent military personnel for political warfare training at Fu Hsing Kang College.

== Departments ==
=== Undergraduate ===
- Department of Political Science (Public Administration Group, International Relations Group)
- Psychological and social work (Psychology Group, Social Work Group)
- Department of Journalism
- Department of Applied Arts (Theater Group, Music Group, Art Group)

=== Graduate school ===
- Political Science (Master, Doctor)
- Psychology (Master)
- Social Work (Master)
- Journalism (Master)

== Notable alumni ==
- Henry Liu – Taiwanese writer and journalist
- Jin Chao-chun – Taiwanese actor
- Muammar Gaddafi – Libyan leader
- Roberto D'Aubuisson – founder of the Nationalist Republican Alliance in El Salvador. Notorious war criminal known as “Blow Torch Bob”
- Ya Hsien - Taiwanese poet and scholar

== See also ==
- World Anti-Communist League
- Political warfare
- Ray S. Cline
