= Lin Ming-chang =

Taiwanese chemist

- 林明璋
- Born: 24 October 1936 (age 89); Xinpu, Shinchiku, Taiwan, Empire of Japan
- Education: National Taiwan Normal University (BS); University of Ottawa (PhD)
- Awards: Navy Meritorious Civilian Service Award; Humboldt Prize

Lin Ming-chang (Chinese: 林明璋; pinyin: Lín Míngzhāng; born 24 October 1936) is a Taiwanese chemist.

== Life and career ==
Born in Zhaomen, Xinpu, Hsinchu, on 24 October 1936, Lin Ming-chang attended Hsinchu Senior High School and graduated from National Taiwan Normal University before pursuing graduate study under Keith J. Laidler at the University of Ottawa. After completing his postdoctoral research in Ottawa, Lin joined Simon H. Bauer at Cornell University in 1967. Lin moved to the United States Naval Research Laboratory in 1970.

While working at the NRL, Lin received a Navy Meritorious Civilian Service Award in 1979, followed by a Guggenheim fellowship and Alexander von Humboldt Award in 1982. From 1981, Lin concurrently held an adjunct professorship at the Catholic University of America. in 1988, he became Robert W. Woodruff Professor of Chemistry at Emory University. In 2000, he became a member of Academia Sinica.

Lin was named TSMC Distinguished Professor at National Chiao Tung University in 2005, where he had served as director of the Center for Interdisciplinary Molecular Science since 2002. In 2009, Lin was named a foreign fellow of the Royal Society of Chemistry. Lin retired from NCTU in 2011, and was granted distinguished professor emeritus status.

Lin supported Tsai Ing-wen's 2012 presidential campaign. Lin backed efforts to end nuclear power production in Taiwan, submitting a petition advising people to vote against question ten of the 2018 Taiwanese referendum.
