= Xinpu, Hsinchu =

Coordinates: 24°50′52″N 121°05′44″E

Xinpu Township 新埔鎭
- Urban township
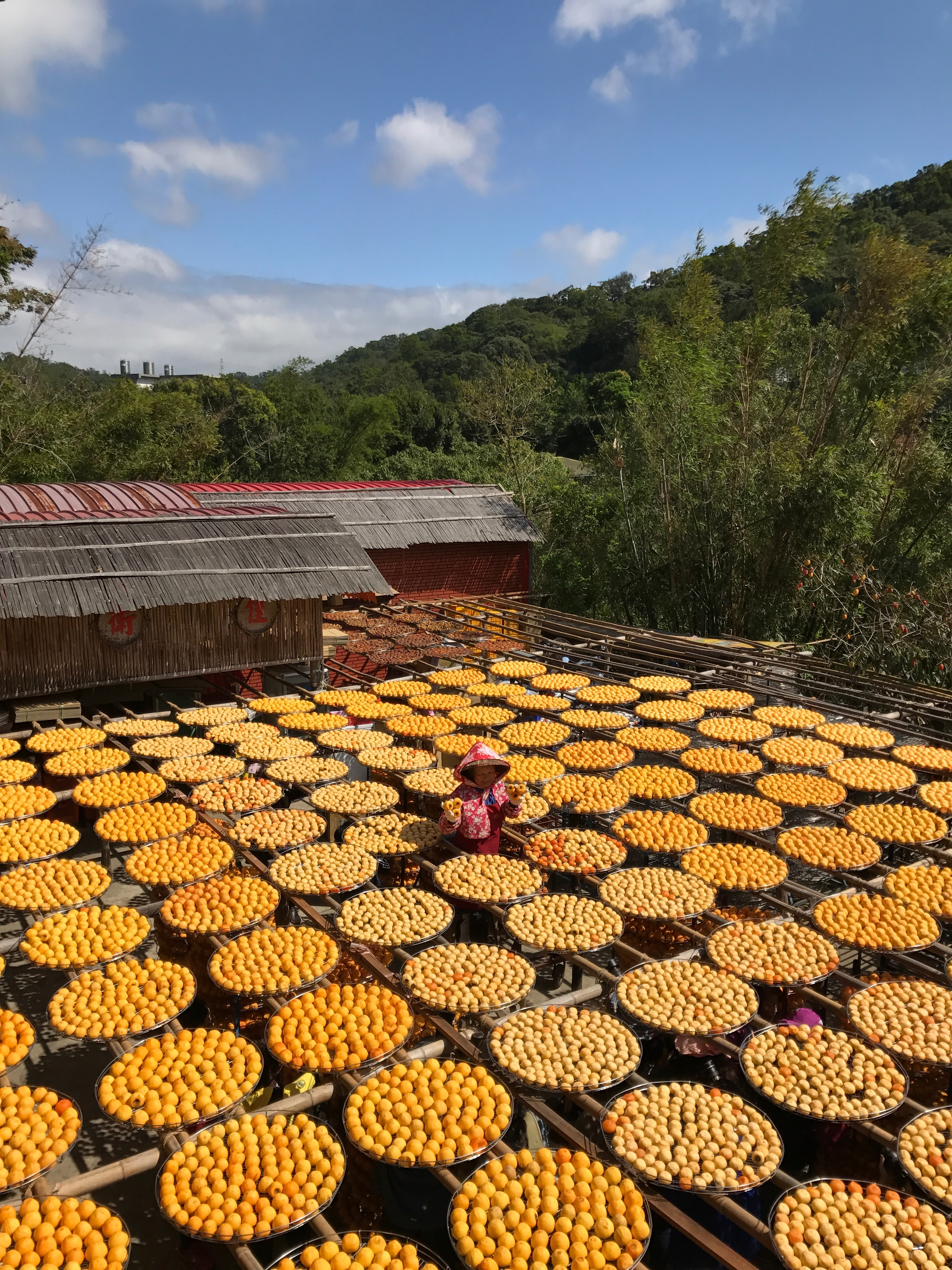
- Persimmons drying in Xinpu Township

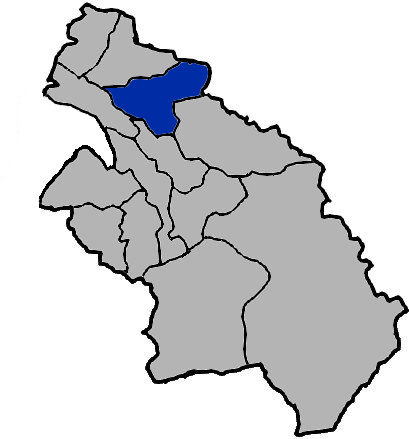
- Xinpu Township in Hsinchu County
- Location: Hsinchu County, Taiwan

Area
  - Total: 72 km^{2} (28 sq mi)

Population (February 2023)
  - Total: 33,002
  - Density: 460/km^{2} (1,200/sq mi)

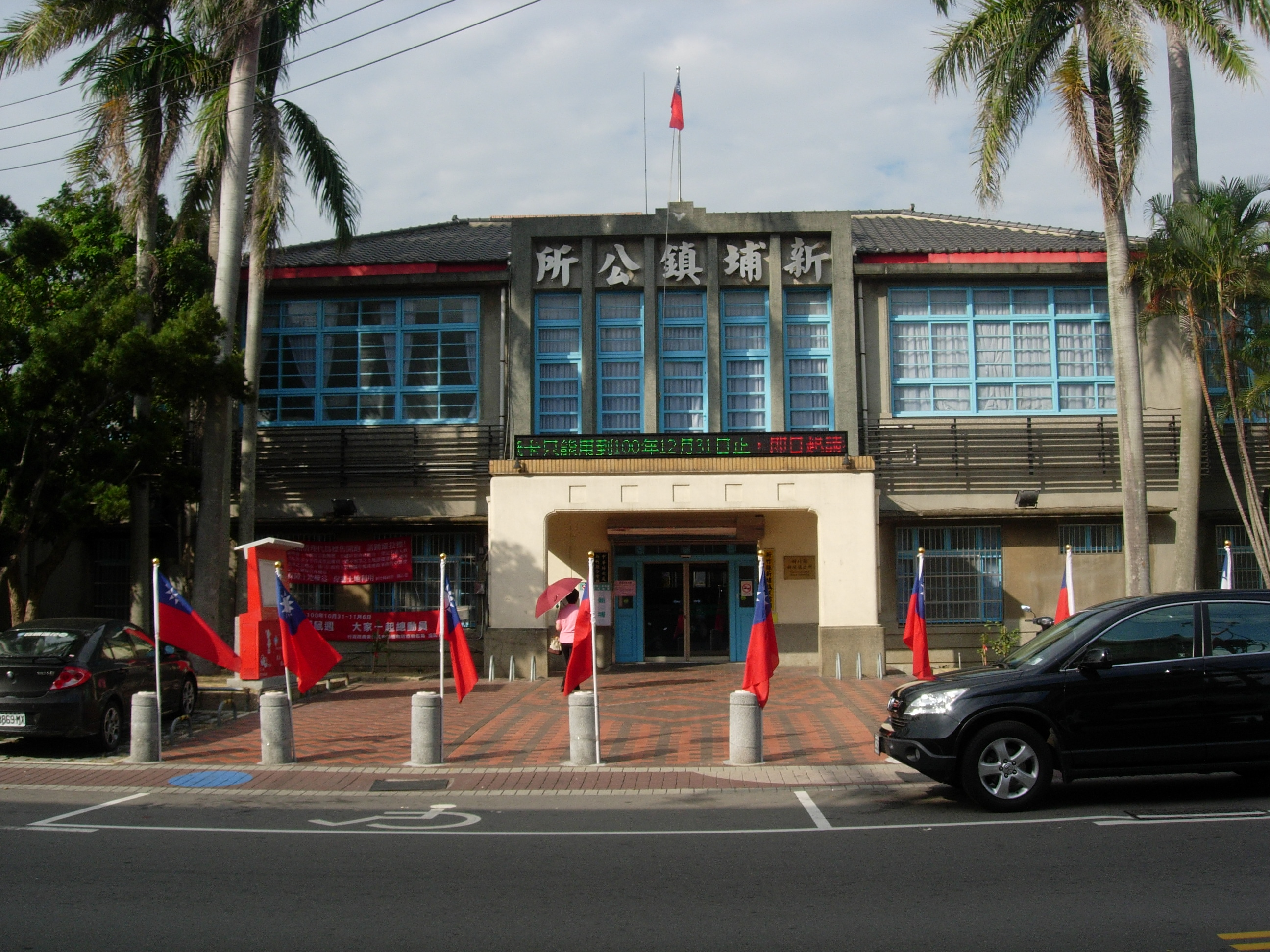
Hsinpu Township office

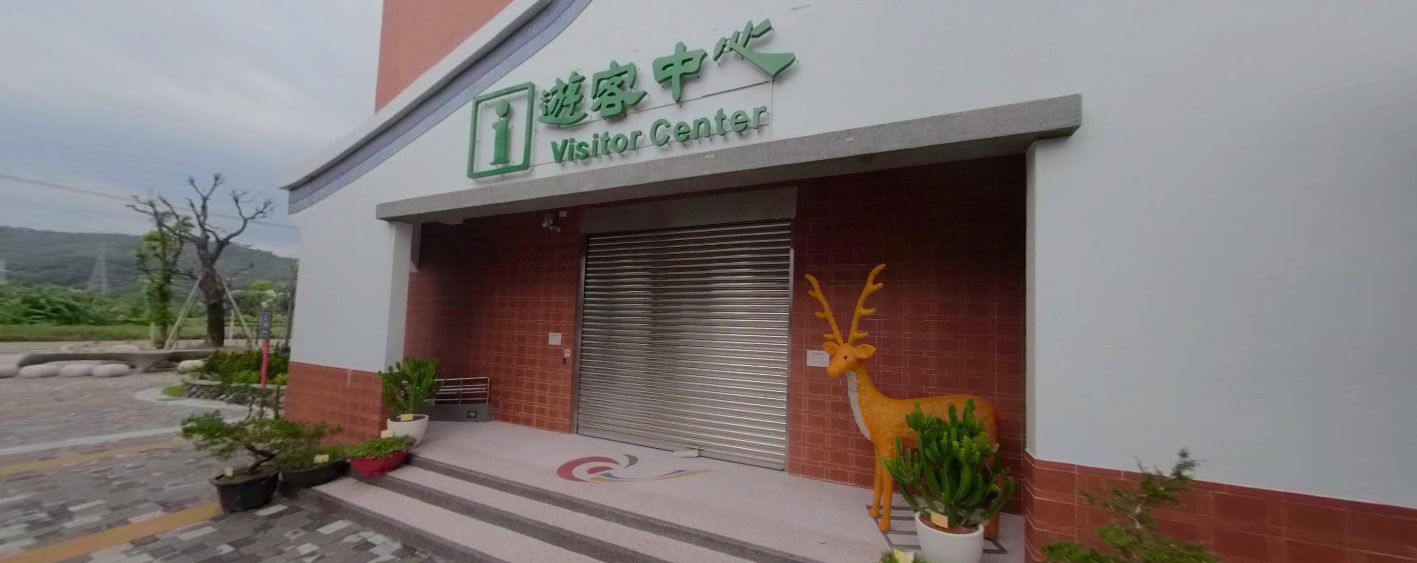

Xinpu Township (Chinese: 新埔鎭; pinyin: Xīnpǔ Zhèn; also known as Hsinpu) is an urban township in Hsinchu County, Taiwan.

== History ==
Xinpu was formerly known as Baliguo (吧哩嘓), a commercial center during the Jiaqing Emperor rule of Qing Dynasty.

== Geography ==
Area: 72.19 square kilometres (27.87 sq mi)
Population: 33,002 (February 2023)

== Administrative divisions ==
The township comprises 19 villages: Baoshi, Beiping, Hankeng, Jupu, Luming, Nanping, Neili, Qingshui, Shangliao, Sizuo, Tianxin, Wenshan, Wupu, Xialiao, Xinbei, Xinmin, Xinpu, Xinsheng and Zhaomen.

== Tourist attractions ==
- Zhaomen Leisure Agricultural Zone
- Zhaomen Zone
- Taiwan Cycling Route No.1 Passes through Xinpu township.
- Recently rebuilt (Early 2019) Hsinchu County Xinpu Township Office and Visitor Center

== Transportation ==
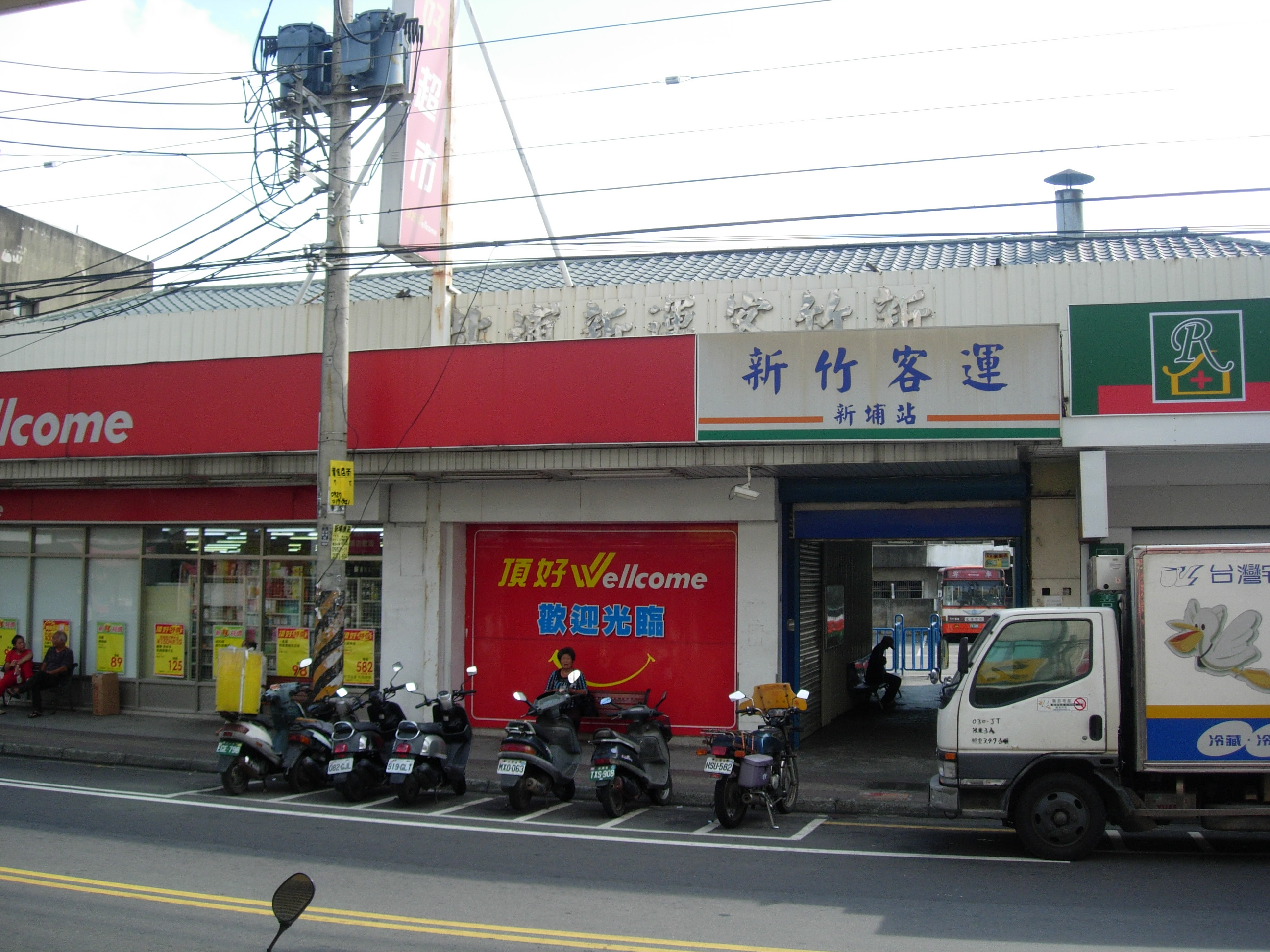
Xinpu Bus Station

Bus station in the township is Xinpu Bus Station of Hsinchu Bus. Taiwan High Speed Rail passes through the western part of the township, but there is no planned station.

== Education ==
=== Elementary ===
- Xinzhuxianxinbuzhenguomin High School

Hsinchu County Xinpu Township National High School

- Ching-Shuei Elementary School
- Xinzhuxianxinbuzhenbaoshi Elementary School

Hsinchu County Xinpu County Bao-shi Elementary School

- Xinzhuxianxinbuzhenxinbu Elementary School

Hsinchu County Xinpu County Xinpu Elementary School

- Xinzhuxianxinbuzhenwenshan Elementary School

Hsinchu County Xinpu County Wen-shan Elementary School

- Fangliao Elementary School
- Jhao-Men Elementary School
- Xinzhuxianxinbuzhenxinxing Elementary School

Hsinchu County Xinpu County Xin-xing Elementary School

- Chao-Tung Elementary School

=== High schools ===
- Xinzhuxianzhaomenguomin High School

Hsinchu County Zhao-men High School

- School Library Pei Pin, Hsin Chuw County

Hsinchu County Pei-ping Waldorf School

- 新竹縣照海華德福實驗教育機構

Hsinchu County Tsio-hai Waldorf Education Organization

- Tianzhujiaoneisi Vocational High School

Nei-si Catholic Vocational High School

=== Other ===
- 新埔數位機會中心(新埔DOC)

Xinpu [Something, ?"Digital Chance"?] Center

- 新竹縣私立仁美幼兒園

Hsinchu County Ren-mei Private Kindergarten

== Notable natives ==
- Fangge Dupan, poet
- Lin Ming-chang, chemist
