= Chuang Ling-yun =

Taiwanese actress (1999–2021)

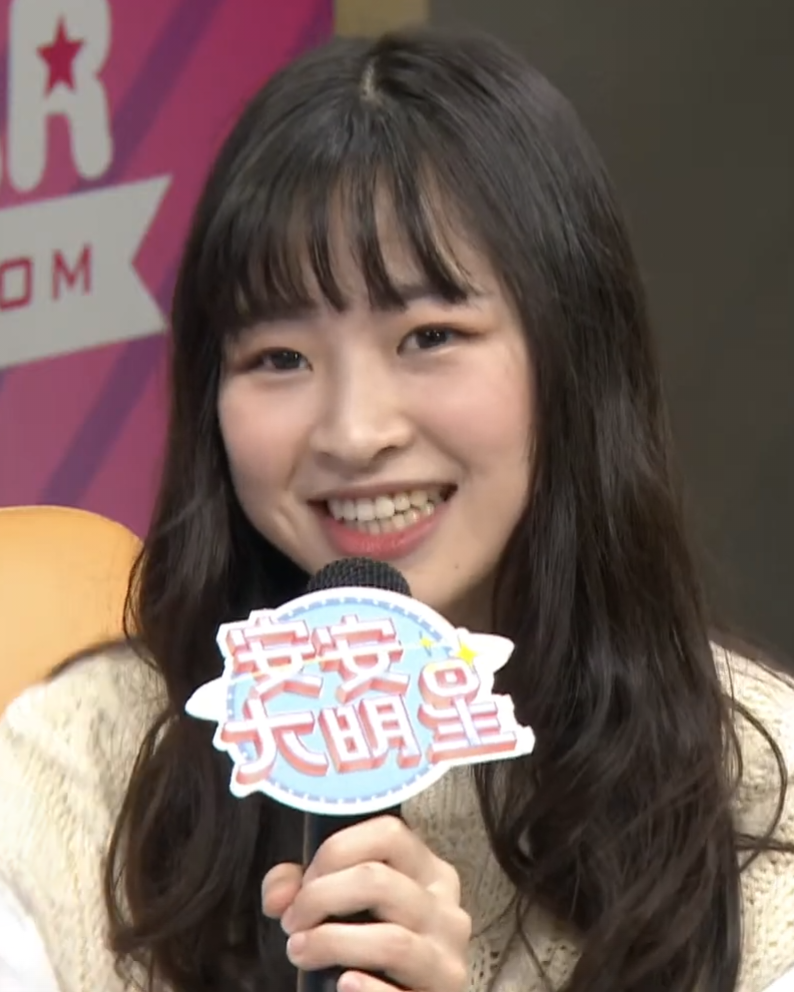
- Chuang in November 2020
- Born: 9 October 1999; Keelung, Taiwan
- Died: 5 March 2021 (aged 21); Cathay General Hospital, Daan District, Taipei, Taiwan
- Cause of death: suicide by jumping
- Occupation: actress

Chuang Ling-yun (9 October 1999 – 5 March 2021) was a Taiwanese actress and singer. She was one of the participants at the 2018 Taiwanese singing program Jungle Voice. She released her only single in November 2020.

On 1 February 2021, Chuang was struck twice by her father during an argument with her family. She reported the incident to the police and started living temporarily at her mother's residence. On 5 March 2021 she jumped from the 10th floor of a school in Songshan District, Taipei and died at the age of 21.
