= Wu Chuo-liu =

Taiwanese journalist and novelist

- 吳濁流
- Born: Wu Jiantian; 28 June 1900; Shimpu, Shinchiku, Japanese Taiwan
- Died: 7 October 1976 (aged 76)
- Education: Taiwan Governor's Office Japanese School

Wu Chuo-liu (Chinese: 吳濁流; pinyin: Wú Zhuóliú), born Wu Jiantian (吳建田) (2 June 1900, Shimpu, Shinchiku – 7 October 1976, Taipei?) was an influential Taiwanese journalist and novelist of Hakka ancestry. He has been described as the most powerful witness to history in Taiwanese letters. Many of his most important novels were first written in Japanese.

== Life and work ==
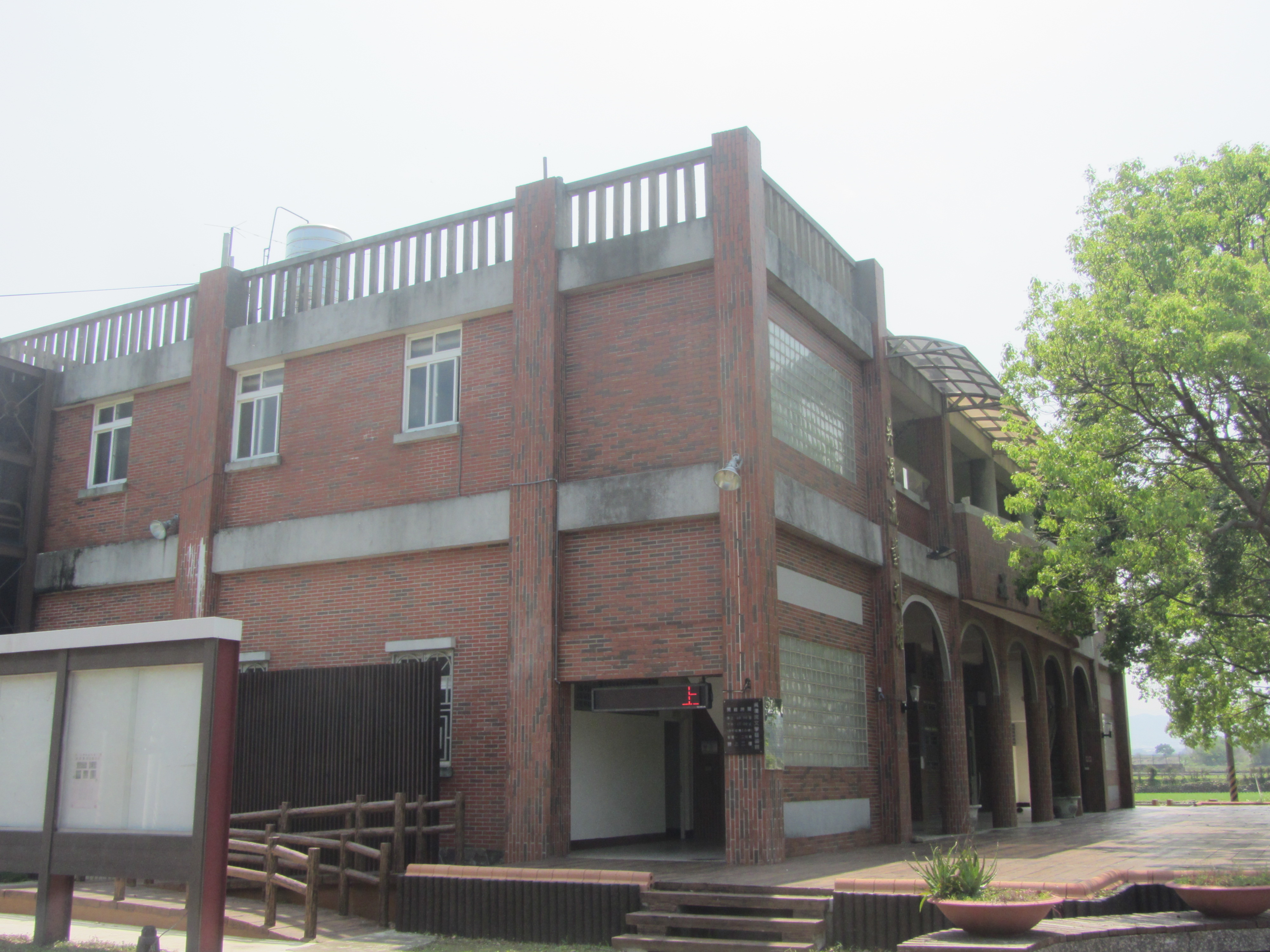
Wu Chuo-liu Art and Cultural Hall

His family was long established in Shimpu in what is now called Hsinchu County. His grandfather, Wu Fang-hsin, was a well-known traditional poet. He began with a standard Chinese education but, due to the Japanese rule, most of his studies were conducted in the Japanese manner. In 1916, he was admitted to the "Taiwan Governor's Office Japanese School". In 1919, he visited Japan for the first time on a school trip that lasted 18 days—it was an eye opener. He graduated in 1920 and became a teacher in the public schools.

After publishing an article called "School and Autonomy", he was labeled a radical by the Japanese government and transferred to a village school in Byōritsu District. In 1927, he joined the Kurisha Poetry Society, a group that would produce some of Taiwan's best known modern poets. Ten years later, he managed to secure an appointment as "Chief Disciplinarian" of the schools in Kansai, Shinchiku, but he resigned in 1940, following an incident in which the teachers were insulted by the Japanese authorities.

In 1941, he went to China and worked as a reporter in Nanking for Mainland News (大陸新聞). He stayed in China for 15 months and returned home in 1943 and took a position with the Taiwan Daily News. These experiences served as the inspiration for his most famous work, Orphan of Asia, a semi-autobiographical account of the experiences of a fictional protagonist named Hu Taiming (胡太明) during the course of the colonial period. This work, which highlighted the ambiguity and tension inherent in being Taiwanese, has since become a key text in the contentious subject of Taiwanese identity. He is also known for his autobiography The Fig Tree (無花果).

After the war, he continued his journalistic work at the People's Daily, but the political repression that followed the February 28 incident of 1947 forced him to abandon this line of work for seven years. During that time, he served as director of the Tatung Senior High School.

In 1964, Wu was one of the founders of the magazine Taiwan Literature and Art, which served as a starting point for many of Taiwan's young aspiring writers. At that time though, emphasizing Taiwanese identity was still politically controversial and Wu was pressured by the authorities to drop 'Taiwan' from the title of his magazine. He demurred: "what I want to promote is Taiwan native literature and arts. Drop 'Taiwan' [from the title] and the whole venture loses its meaning". The title stayed.

In 1969, using money from his own pension, Wu established the Taiwan Literature Award (台灣文學獎) – it was later renamed the Wu Chuo-liu Literary Award. It remains one of Taiwans's prestigious literary awards to this day.

He died in 1976, following a brief illness.

== Bibliography ==
- Wu, Zhuoliu (1956). Ajia no koji アジアの孤児 [Orphan of Asia] (in Japanese). Tōkyō: 一二三書房. OCLC 80018391.
  - Wu, Zhuoliu (2008). Orphan of Asia. Translated by Mentzas, Ioannis. New York: Columbia University Press. ISBN 9780231137263.
- Wu, Zhuoliu (1970). Wu hua guo 無花果 (in Chinese). Taipei: 林白出版社. OCLC 50775839.
  - Wu, Zhuoliu (2002). The Fig Tree: Memoirs of a Taiwanese Patriot. Translated by Hunter, Duncan. Bloomington: AuthorHouse. ISBN 9781403321503.
