= Sze-Piao Yang =

Taiwanese physician and pulmonologist (1920–2021)

- 楊思標
- Born: 4 June 1920; Hsinchu, Shinchiku Prefecture, Taiwan
- Died: 26 May 2021 (aged 100)
- Education: National Taiwan University (BS); Niigata University (PhD)
- Occupations: General physician Pulmonologist
- Known for: Developing thoracic medicine and X-ray interpretation in Taiwan
- Awards: 2018 Medical Contribution Award

Sze-Piao Yang (Chinese: 楊思標; pinyin: Yáng Sībiāo; 4 June 1920 – 26 May 2021), also spelled as Sibiao Yang, was a Taiwanese physician and pulmonologist who focused on treating tuberculosis and related lung diseases. He acted as dean of the affiliated hospital of the National Taiwan University Hospital from 1978 to 1984. He then served concurrently as the dean of the National Taiwan University School of Medicine from 1983 to 1985, and also as president of the Tzu Chi University of Science and Technology. He is referred to as the "Father of Thoracic X-ray Interpretation in Taiwan" due to his work in establishing the field of research involving X-rays in Taiwan.

== Childhood and education ==
Born in Hsinchu on 4 June 1920, Yang went on to attend and graduate from National Taiwan University with a Bachelor of Science. Because of the rampant outbreaks of tuberculosis in his youth and contracting the disease during his schooling years, Yang's medical education and research ended up focusing on that and other lung-based diseases. He decided after recovering from his illness that he was only able to survive because of his access to medical care and the "financially underprivileged" wouldn't have the same level of healthcare accessibility, so he wanted to devote himself to such treatments He then continued his education at the Niigata Medical University, obtaining his Ph.D.

== Career ==
After completing his degree at the National Taiwan University, Yang went on to become an unpaid deputy in the university's hospital at the Department of Internal Medicine. During the day, he assisted doctors with their procedures and worked on lab research during the night. However, because Taiwan was under Japanese rule at the time, it was difficult for Taiwanese medical workers to advance to full positions. It wasn't until he turned 25 and Taiwan gained independence after WWII that he was given the opportunity to become a professor at the university. After a number of promotions, he was also given a grant by the Ministry of Education to study medical techniques in the United States.

The earliest research Yang was involved in during the 1940s and 1950s was thoracic medicine and he was the first to conduct such research in Taiwan after his return to the country. His first major case occurred in 1951 while treating tuberculosis patients. A ship's captain had purportedly contracted the disease, but Yang's analysis of the sputum found that the man was instead infected with lung leeches, which can frequently be misdiagnosed as a variety of lung-based diseases. The cause of such infections usually results from eating raw shellfish and it led to Yang further investigating and writing a paper on how lung leech infections occur. His research was published both in the journal of the International Society of Thoracic Diseases in 1954 and then the American Journal of Respiratory and Critical Care Medicine in 1955. These were the first papers from Taiwan published in major international journals and resulted in his work being included in medical textbooks in Taiwan. Another incident in 1952 involving a trio of sick mine workers resulted in Yang being sent to Jinguashi to investigate and he was able to do a work environment study to determine that pneumoconiosis was the cause of the outbreak. This resulted in the first occupational disease research that was conducted in Taiwan.

Yang would go on to establish a Joint Thoracic Disease Symposium in the mid-1950s involving multiple hospitals and would treat the first person in Taiwan for lung cancer in 1957. Another medical conference was established by Yang in 1971 named The Second Asia Pacific Conference on Thoracic Diseases for an international attendance. After this, he would continue his medical work and eventually become dean of the school of medicine at the National Taiwan University and of the on-campus hospital in 1979. That same year, he joined the Sino-Saudi Medical Corps in order to expand Taiwan's medical outreach to other countries. Starting in 1984, he became the director of the Tzu Chi general hospital and was involved in the opening of the hospital in 1986. He also was the first principal of the Tzu Chi Nursing College (later renamed to the University of Science and Technology) and helped in its creation.

An area of research Yang became highly trained in was X-ray interpretations and even after his retirement from the hospital in 1985, he spent the next three decades until 2018 traveling once a week to the Hualien Tzu Chi Hospital to teach students how to read and interpret patient X-rays.

== Awards, honours, and legacy ==
The 2018 Medical Contribution Award was given to Yang for his contributions to medical knowledge throughout his lifetime. A TV series also aired in 2019 titled "Hundred Years Old Doctor" that was based around events in his life.

== Personal life ==
During his early 20's working as a medical assistant in the National Taiwan University Hospital, Yang met the head nurse at the time, Chen Baoyu. Later, at the height of World War II, the Japanese commercial ship Takachihomaru was sunk by American battleships at the Port of Keelung. His brother, sister-in-law, and their yet-to-be-born child died in the incident, and the grief this caused the family resulted in them ordering Yang to get married. This never occurred with Chen, however, due to him leaving for his research grant in the United States and this part of his life was dramatized in the theater play titled Medical World Love. In the subsequent years, he was married to a different partner, but she died in the 1960s, and he later rekindled a relationship with Chen before marrying her in 1984.

Yang published a book about his life in early 2018 titled A Hundred Years Old Physician Dedicates with Love with the dedication that he would not retire until he reached 100 years old. In March 2018, Yang donated $60 million out of his life savings to the Tzu Chi general hospital. He died on 26 May 2021, aged 100.

== Bibliography ==
- — (2017). 百歲醫師以愛奉獻: 楊思標教授的醫者之路 [A Hundred Years Old Physician Dedicates with Love: Professor Yang Sibiao's path as a doctor] (in Chinese). Tzu Chi Communication Humanities Foundation. ISBN 9789866292941.
