= Zi-Yun Wei =

Zi-Yun Wei (simplified Chinese: 魏子云; traditional Chinese: 魏子雲; Pe̍h-ōe-jī: Wèi Ziyún; 1917 - December 27, 2005) was a Chinese classics scholar. He is most famous for his study of Jin Ping Mei (金瓶梅), a novel written by Lanling Xiaoxiao Sheng during the Ming dynasty. In addition to Jin-Ping-Mei, his works incorporate a wide range of Chinese literature including traditional Chinese operas and grass-root novels.

Zi-Yun Wei was born in Anhui province, China. He died on December 27, 2005, at age 88.
