= Blue Star Poetry Society =

The Blue Star Poetry Society (Chinese: 藍星詩社), founded in March 1954, was a salon-style poetry society that focused on pure poetry and lyricism. The poetry society was initiated by Taiwanese writers, such as Chin Tzu-hao (覃子豪). In the context of the Nationalist government's promotion of anti-communism and the policy of combat literature, as well as the background of the modern poetry society of Chi Hsien (紀弦) that advocated intellectual contents and rejected the lyrical, the Blue Star Poetry Society which primarily focused on pure poetry and lyricism stood out as the only salon-style poetry society without a president, rules or repetitious, please revise.

== Activities ==
The Blue Star Poetry Society advocated a steady and progressive approach by avoiding detachment from the times, writing outdated poems or indulging in fantasies. The society aimed to express and create content from real-life experiences. Due to the society's stance, some members participated in literary debates about modern poetry in the 1950s. The debates included the “Modernism Debate” against Chi Hsien on directions of modern poetry, the "Symbolism Debate" which responded to doubts about modern poetry by figures like Su Hsieh-lin (蘇雪林) and the "New Poetry Debate Discussions" with writer Yen Hsi (言曦).

The Blue Star Poetry Society published various periodicals, with the first being the Blue Star Poetry Weekly (藍星週刊), published on the Taiwan Justice Weekly News (公論報). The most recent publication was Blue Beauty of Tamkang: Blue Star Poetics (淡藍為美：藍星詩學), published in 2007. The society also organized several annual and anniversary events in its early years to foster connections between authors and readers.
