= National Hsinchu Girls' Senior High School =

- 國立新竹女子高級中學
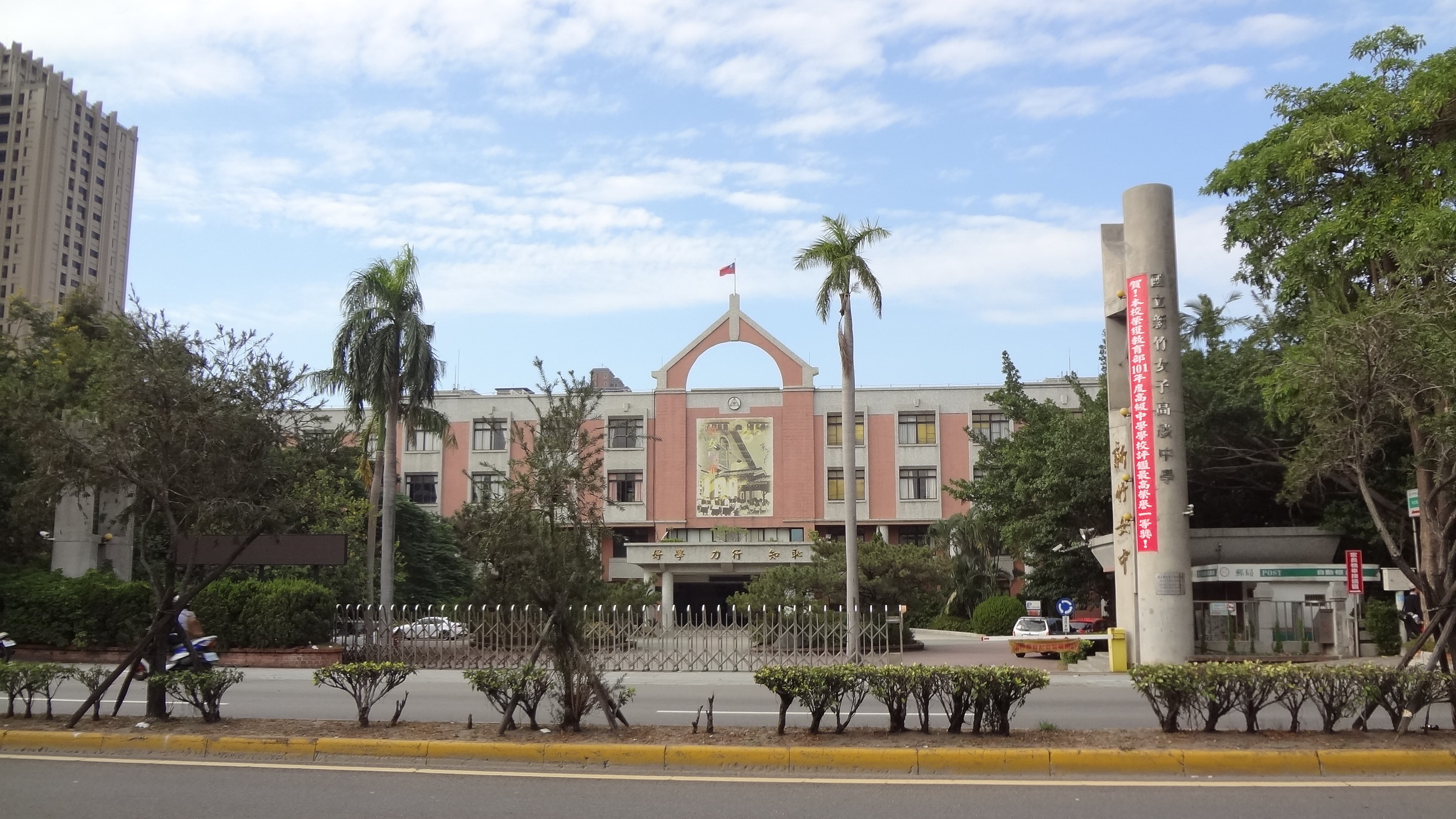

Location
- 270, Zhong-Hua Road Sec.2, East, Hsinchu City, Taiwan

Information
- Type: Public High School
- Established: 1924
- Principal: Lin Guifeng 林桂鳳
- Grades: 10 through 12
- Enrollment: 2000
- Website: http://www.hgsh.hc.edu.tw/

The National Hsinchu Girls' Senior High School (Chinese: 國立新竹女子高級中學) is a high ranked public high school in East District, Hsinchu City, Taiwan. Student enrollment averages around 2000. Students take Comprehensive Assessment Program for Junior High School Students (Chinese: 國中教育會考)to attend school. The campus is in Hsinchu City downtown where transportation is convenient, only 400 meters away from Hsinchu Train Station.

== School History ==
- 4.24.1924: Japan Established with the name of Hsinchu State Hsinchu Girls' High School
- 12.1945: The school was renamed Taiwan Province Hsinchu Girls' High School.
- 1988: The Art Talented Program was established, and the school became one of the first girls’ high schools to admit male students.
- 1996: A Mathematical Talented Class was introduced, contributing to the development of Taiwanese scientific talent and achieving success in national and international competitions.
- 2000: Following the abolition of provincial administration, the school was renamed National Hsinchu Girls' Senior High School.
- 2005: A Language and Literature Talented Class was added.

== See also ==
- Education in Taiwan
