= Cai Sufen =

Taiwanese novelist

- 蔡素芬
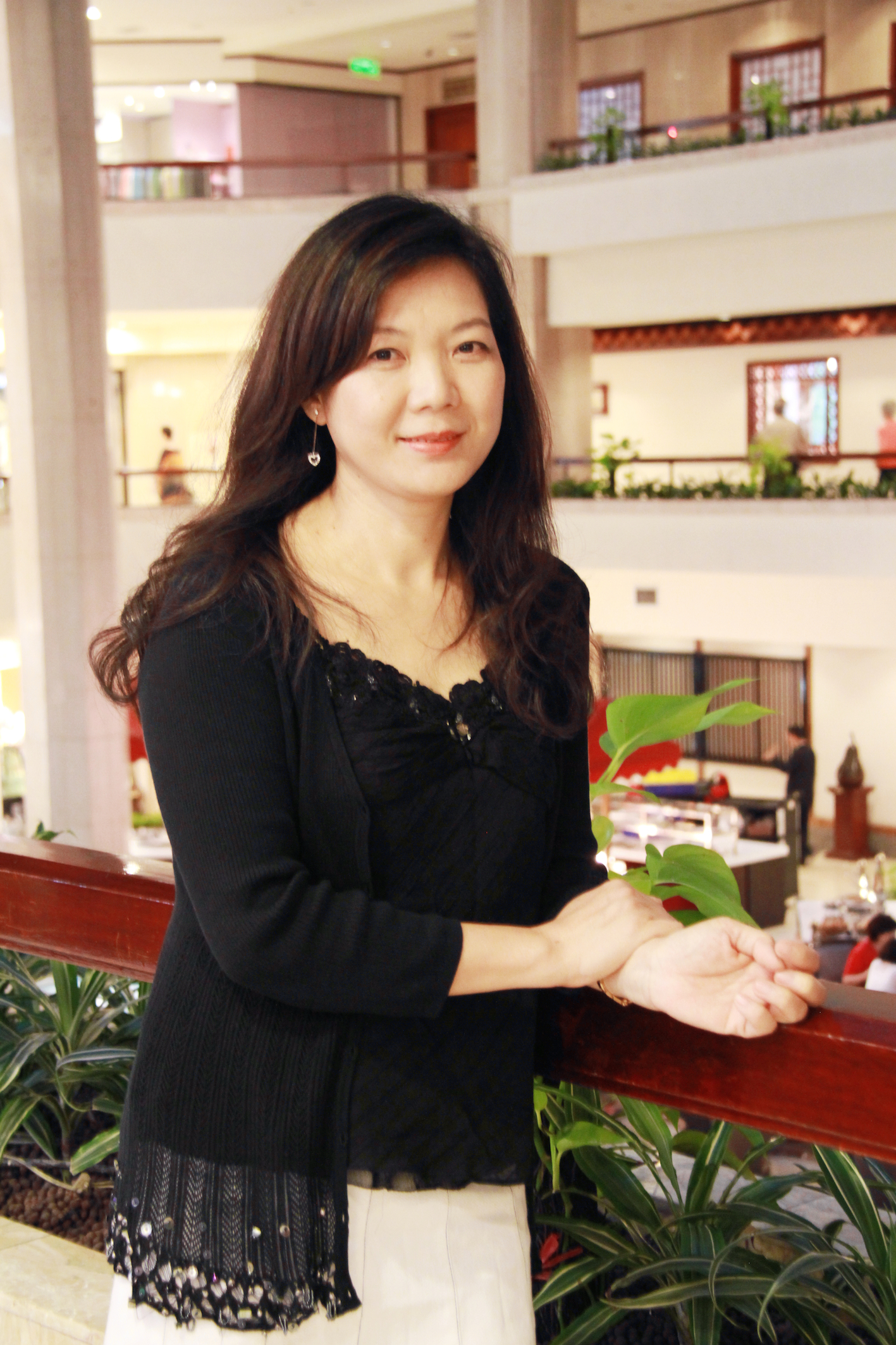
- Born: 1963 (age 62–63)
- Occupation: Writer

Cai Sufen (Chinese: 蔡素芬; pinyin: Cài Sùfēn; born 1963) is a Taiwanese novelist, working for the Liberty Times. Her best known books, The Child of Salt Pan and The Olive Tree, describe the life and development of a mother and her daughter. The Olive Tree, after being featured on Long-Si Ho's Book of the Month Club, became a best-seller.
