= Global Cooperation and Training Framework =

The Global Cooperation and Training Framework (GCTF) is a transnational training programme initiated by a 2015 memorandum of understanding between the government of Taiwan and the American Institute in Taiwan. It holds several international seminars and forums every year, with experts and officials from the participating countries. Topics include public health, women's rights, media literacy, information security, and humanitarian aid. Japan joined the framework in 2019, Australia in 2021, Canada in 2024, and the United Kingdom in 2025. It is headquartered at Taiwan’s Ministry of Foreign Affairs.

== See also ==
- Foreign relations of Taiwan
