= Chang Hsiu-ya =

Taiwanese writer

Chang Hsiu-ya (Chinese: 張秀亞; September 16, 1919 – June 29, 2001) was a female writer from Taiwan, also known by her baptismal name Cecilia (則濟利亞) and pen names such as Chen Lan (陳藍), Chang Ya-lan (張亞藍), Hsin-ching (心井, literally "Well of Heart"), and others. Born in Cang County, Hebei Province, China, her family moved to Tianjin when she was seven years old. She later came to Taiwan in 1948. She served as a professor at Providence University and Fu Jen Catholic University's Graduate Institute. She is particularly well-known for her prose.

== Career ==
Chang Hsiu-ya began publishing works in children's weekly magazines when she was nine years old. At the age of 15, she published poems in the literary weekly of the Yi Shi Bao (益世報) magazine. At 17, she published her first book, By the Banks of the Talung River (大龍河畔). In 1948, she started publishing under the pen name Hsin-ching in Taiwan. In 1952, she published her first prose collection in Taiwan under her real name, Wild Pansy (三色堇).

Chang excelled in poetry, prose, and fiction, with a dreamlike writing style. Her life experiences led to a shift in the themes of her prose, focusing on simple character sketches and everyday life. In the 1970s, her prose became more philosophical and reflective, incorporating literary criticism. Taiwanese scholar Frances Chang (張瑞芬) considers Ode to Narcissus (水仙辭), Lake Water and Autumn Oranges (湖水・秋橙), and Below the Northern Window (北窗下) as the three peaks of Chang’s prose craftsmanship.

== Reception ==
Chang Hsiu-ya was not only a significant figure in women's literature, but was also hailed by poet Ya Hsien as a "master of beautiful writing". Ya believed that Chang was an artist full of nativist colors. Chen Fang-ming (陳芳明) pointed out that "her noteworthy creative technique lies not in localization, but in the tireless pursuit of imagination."
