= Huang Fengzi =

Taiwanese writer

Huang Fengzi (or Feng-tzu; born 1928) is an essayist and memoirist in Taiwan, active during the Japanese occupation. Her memoir is one of the few extant sources describing life in Taiwan during the Second World War from the perspective of a girl.

Huang wrote in Japanese and published her first story when she was only in fifth grade. The work was folkloric in nature and was praised by Buhō. She also published an essay on the Yasukuni Shrine. In 1944, as a teenager, Huang published a memoir, Taiwan no shôjo (A Young Girl of Taiwan).

She later married anthropologist Ikeda Toshio.
