= Yang Chian-Ho =

Taiwan's first woman journalist

Yang Chian-Ho (Chinese: 楊千鶴; pinyin: Yáng Qiānhè; Pe̍h-ōe-jī: Iûⁿ Chhian-ho̍h; 1921-2011) was a Taiwanese journalist who is considered Taiwan's first woman journalist.

== Biography ==
Yang Chian-Ho was born in Taihoku in 1921. She was educated in Japanese as Taiwan was under Japanese rule at the time, and graduated from Taihoku Women's College. She worked as a journalist for the Taiwan-based Japanese newspaper Taiwan Daily News (the largest newspaper in Taiwan at the time). As a journalist, she interviewed many public figures and introduced Taiwanese culture and advanced knowledge in areas such as education and health to facilitate the modernization of Taiwan society. She also wrote essays and short stories, which appeared in various publications.

In 1942 she published a short story, The Season When Flowers Bloom (花咲く季節), depicted the life and inner-world of the young educated women. She addressed the topics of female friendships, self-concept and consciousness-raising for women, family communication and pursuit of happiness. It was widely cited by researchers in trying to understand women's choices in upper-middle class society and the social expectations pushing them toward marriage during that time in Taiwan. In 2023, the original Japanese text was translated into English, Chinese and Taiwanese by her daughter, Chimei Lin Chen.

In 1993, Yang published her memoir, Prism of Life (人生のプリズム) in Japanese and translated into Chinese in 1995.
