= Bi Pu =

Chinese broadcaster, writer and translator

Bi Pu 畢璞
- Born: Zhou Sunshan 周素珊; May 16, 1922 Guangzhou
- Died: January 1, 2016 (aged 93)

Bi Pu (Chinese: 畢璞; Pe̍h-ōe-jī: Pit Phok), born Zhou Sunshan (Chinese: 周素珊; Pe̍h-ōe-jī: Chiu Sò͘-san) was a Chinese writer and translator, who was born in Guangzhou and later based in Taiwan.

== Life ==
Bi Pu was born in Lingnan University, Guangzhou. Her father taught at Lingnan University. The eldest of seven brothers and sisters in her hours at Affiliated Ling attended kindergarten, she lived in Tianjin for several years, but return to Guangzhou at age eight.

In 1943, during the Second Sino-Japanese War, as her parents fled from Macau to the capital cities of Guangdong and Guangxi, her notes became her first submission to Travel Journey Magazine. The following year, as her family fled from Wuzhou to Guilin, she wrote "Fu River Boat Line 20th" to "Cosmic Wind" and met with YE Guangliang, editor in chief of the magazine, and Lin Yi-Chung, publisher (whom she later married).

In 1948, Bi Pu and her husband and children went to Taiwan. Her husband was working at the Gazette at that time, and her family lived in a newspaper-style Japanese public quarters. The editor-in-chief of the Chinese Women of the Women's Federation called for her husband's friend to translate a series of articles on knitting wool, but the friend did not think it appropriate and she recommended BI to translate and open her translation career in Taiwan. From 1952 she worked in a radio station as an editor, from broadcasts to ad copy, and even letters. Focussing mostly on family articles, she began to write short stories and novellas.

With experience of editing for broadcast, Bi turned to the newspaper office and successively served as the home edition editor in Dahua Evening News and China Times. Bi Pu became an editor for the Dahua Evening News. After 1966, Bi moved to live Yonghe District.

In 1997 turned to essay writing over fiction.

In the summer of 2013, Bi Pu donated a work by Feng Zikai in aid of Wen magazine. On 7 July 2014, the publication of Bi Pu's Complete Works book was held in the main meeting room of the Red Chamber of the Taiwan's parliament.

Bi died on New Year's Day 2016.
