= Taichung Literature Museum =

Museum in West, Taichung, Taiwan

- 臺中文學館
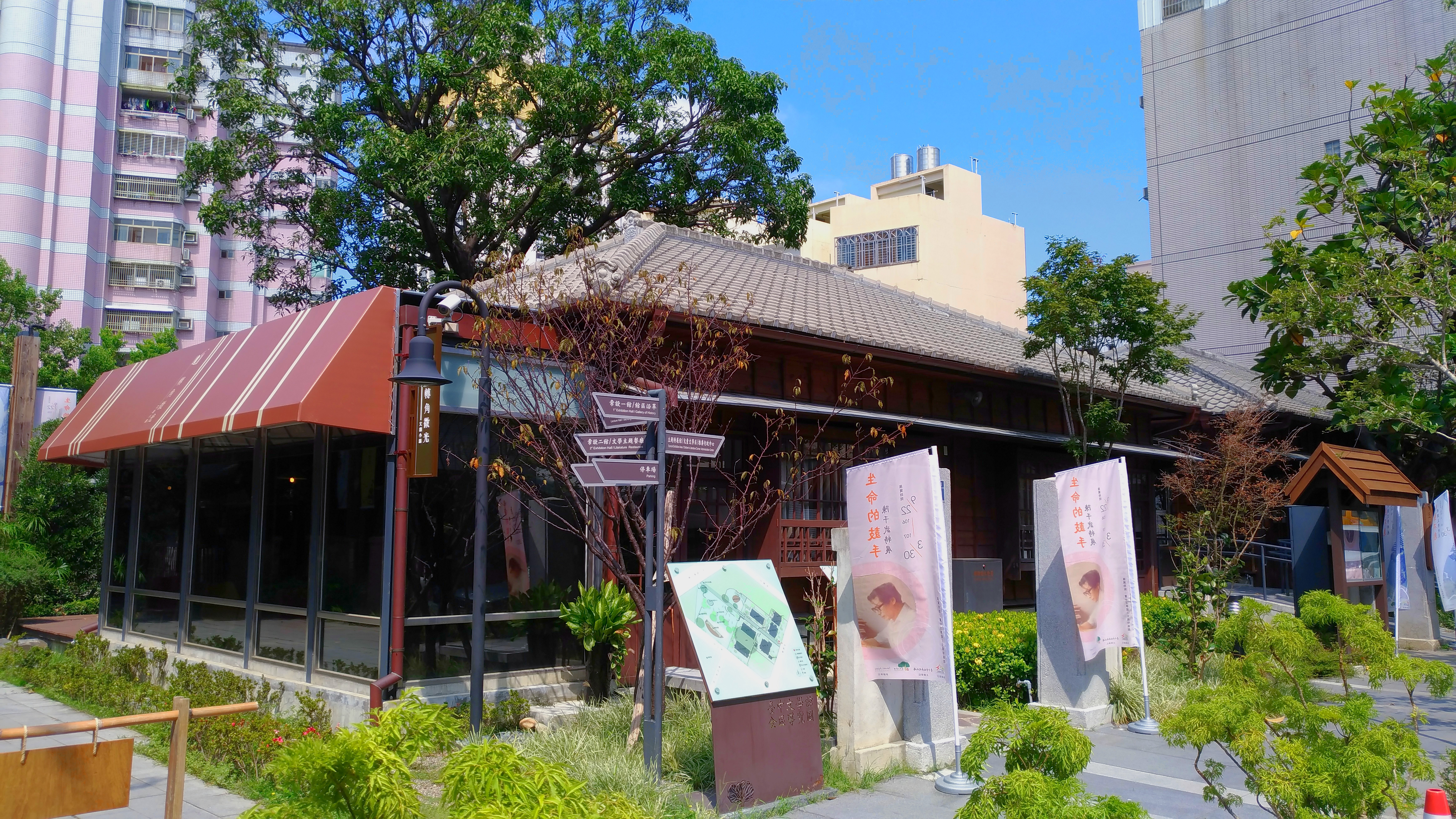
- Established: 26 Augusts 2016
- Location: West, Taichung, Taiwan
- Coordinates: 24°08′22.4″N 120°40′22.0″E
- Type: museum
- Website: Official website

The Taichung Literature Museum (TLM; traditional Chinese: 臺中文學館; simplified Chinese: 台中文学馆; pinyin: Táizhōng Wénxuéguǎn) is a museum in West District, Taichung, Taiwan.

== History ==
The museum buildings were originally constructed as a police dormitory in 1934 during the Japanese rule of Taiwan. In 2009, the buildings were designated as historical buildings by Cultural Affairs Bureau of Taichung City Government. In April 2010, the buildings were renovated by the city government and turned into the Taichung Literature Museum to honor literature contribution and promote literature in Taiwan. The museum exterior part and premises were opened to the public in April 2015 and the museum was fully opened on 26 Augusts 2016.

== Architecture ==
The museum consists of a literature park and six buildings, which are:

- permanent exhibition
- themed exhibition
- children's literature
- workshops and lectures
- themed eatery area
- administration office

== Transportation ==
The museum is accessible by bus from Taichung Station of Taiwan High Speed Rail or Taichung Station of Taiwan Railway.

== See also ==
- List of museums in Taiwan
