= Nai-Ni Chen =

Chinese-American dancer and choreographer (1959–2021)

- Born: October 31, 1959; Keelung, Taiwan
- Died: December 12, 2021 (aged 62); Kailua Beach, Hawaii, U.S.
- Education: Chinese Culture University; New York University
- Occupations: Founder and artistic director, Nai-Ni Chen Dance Company
- Years active: 1988–2021
- Spouse: Andrew N. Chiang
- Children: 1

Nai-Ni Chen (October 31, 1959 – December 12, 2021) was a Taiwanese-American dancer and choreographer. Trained in traditional Chinese and Taiwanese dance before immigrating to the United States in the early 1980s, she was the founder of the Nai-Ni Chen Dance Company, a dance company which blends traditional and contemporary dance.

== Biography ==
Chen was born in Keelung, Taiwan, on October 31, 1959, and started dancing when she was four. She studied modern dance, jazz, and Chinese martial arts at a secondary school for the performing arts; as a student, she joined the Cloud Gate Dance Theater of Taiwan and danced with the company for three years.

In 1982 she moved to New York to attend New York University, where she studied choreography and education. In a 2017 interview she said: “I was so excited about the dancing in New York, that I decided to stay rather than teach in Taiwan.”

Chen drowned while on vacation in Hawaii on December 12, 2021. She and her husband Andrew N. Chiang had one daughter, Sylvia.

== Nai-Ni Chen Dance Company ==
Chen and her husband, Andrew N. Chiang, founded Nai-Ni Chen Dance Company in 1988 in Fort Lee, New Jersey, where she lived with her family. In addition to Chen's original works, which incorporated her broad influences, the company performed traditional fan dances and ribbon dances. Productions frequently include a hybrid fusion with traditional Chinese dance. They began to tour in the early 1990s, originally on the East Coast, and later internationally. The dance company was multi-racial and multi-national. Her dances were inspired by nature, which she described as the "Chinese way and philosophy," stating that her choreography emphasized the relationship and harmony between people and nature.
