= Wang K'ai-yün =

Wang K'ai-yün (Chinese: 王開運; 1889–1969), with courtesy name Hsiao Yen (笑岩), pseudonym Hsing An (杏庵), and pen name Hsing An (幸盫), born in what is now Luju District, Kaohsiung City, Taiwan, was an important local scholar and influential figure in various fields such as literature, culture, politics, finance, and business in the Tainan area during the Japanese rule period and after World War II. Wang authored Poetry Collection of Hsing An (杏庵詩集) and Complete Works of Wang K'ai-yün (王開運全集).

Influenced by his father and elder brothers who had achieved academic success, Wang K'ai-yün was well-versed in traditional Chinese scholarship, particularly in classical Chinese studies. As a result, his literary creations mainly revolved around classical Chinese poetry and prose. He was actively engaged in literary activities, particularly during the 1930s when he contributed to the literary magazine 369 Newspaper (三六九小報) and Taiwan Poetry Circle (臺灣詩壇), established after the Republic of China's government relocated to Taiwan. From 1921 to 1930, Wang K'ai-yün contributed articles to newspapers during the Japanese rule period, expressing his views on various issues such as Taiwanese culture, customs, and economic development.

In 1930, he co-founded 369 Newspaper with members of classical Chinese literary societies in Taiwan. This publication focused on classical Chinese composition and often featured humorous content. Wang K'ai-yün served as an editor for 369 Newspaper and facilitated the collaboration between traditional literati and emerging intellectuals.

== Evaluation ==
Taiwanese literature researcher Shi Yi-lin (施懿琳) believes that Wang K'ai-yün, belonging to the upper echelons of Taiwanese society during the Japanese rule period, should have lived a joyful life, but his works are imbued with a sense of "worldly distress" and "enigmatic melancholy." The reasons for this may be attributed to Wang K'ai-yün's experiences as an intellectual under Japanese rule, his attachment to his homeland, his lamentation over the decline of the cultural and educational realm, and his concerns about the deteriorating social atmosphere.
