= Yao Yi-Wei =

Chinese playwright

Yao Yi-Wei (Chinese: 姚一葦; April 5, 1922 – April 11, 1997), originally named Yao Gong-wei (姚公偉), was a Taiwanese playwright, translator, and art critic. He taught at the National Taiwan University of Arts, Chinese Culture University, and Taipei National University of the Arts. He published and staged numerous theatrical works. Yao Yi-Wei is considered a pioneer in post-war modern theater in Taiwan and a significant advocate for the development of Taiwanese theater and literature. He dedicated himself to establishing the post-war contemporary theater, literature, and art criticism environment in Taiwan, receiving various awards and being praised by novelist Chen Ying-chen as the "lamplighter in the dark night".

== Activities ==
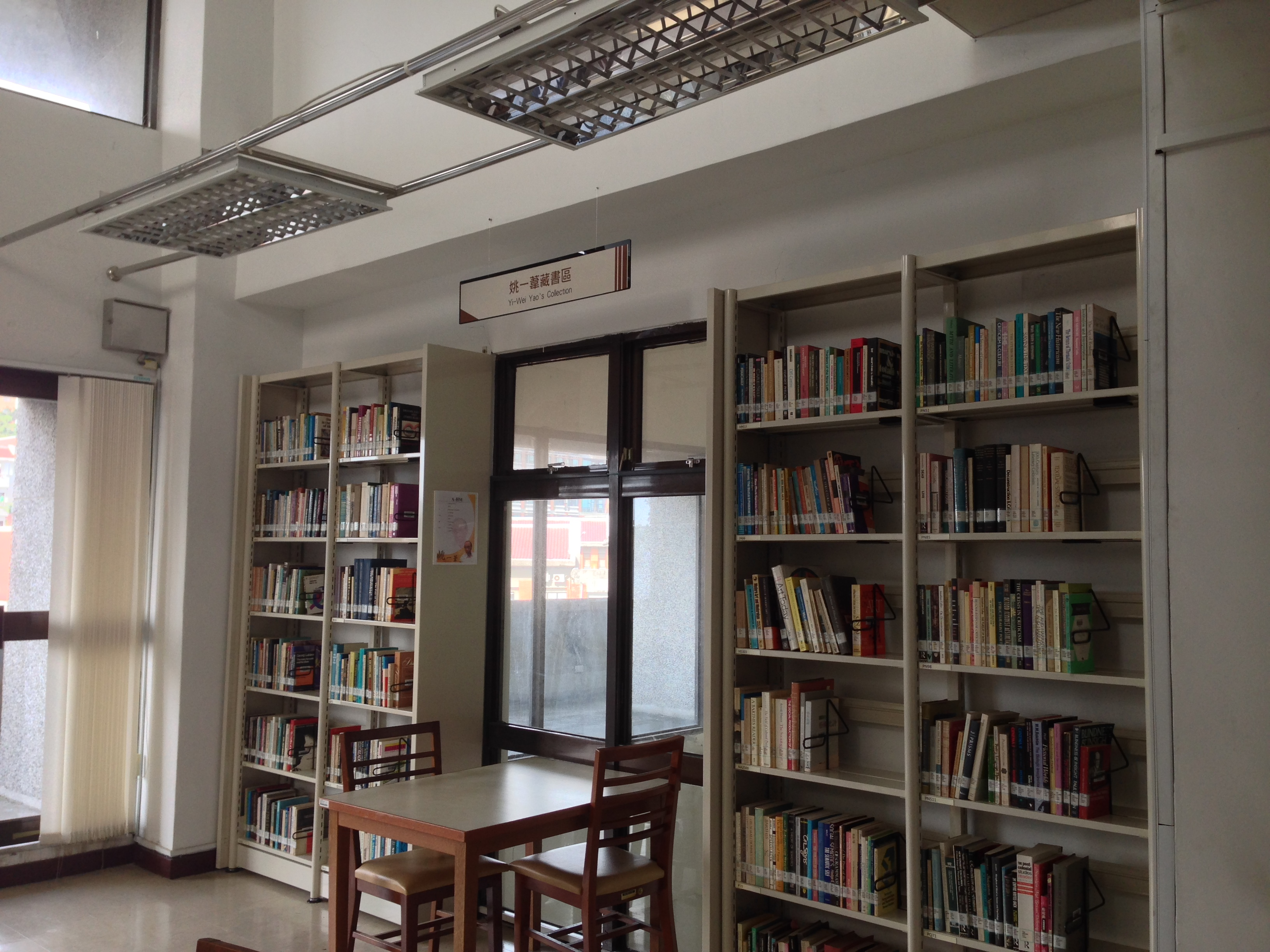
"Yao Yi-Wei Collection" in the Library of Taipei National University of the Arts.

Yao Yi-Wei was born in Poyang County, Jiangxi Province. In 1946, he moved to Taiwan with the Republic of China government and worked at the Bank of Taiwan for 30 years while also serving as a professor at the Graduate Institute of Arts at Chinese Culture University. He participated in the editorial work of various journals and magazines, including Bihuai (筆匯) and Modern Literature Quarterly (現代文學). After retiring from the bank in 1982, he founded the Department of Theatre Arts of the National Institute of the Arts (now Taipei National University of the Arts), organized experimental drama exhibitions annually, and hosted five times from 1980 to 1984, nurturing a large number of young directing talents.

Yao Yi-Wei's creative works span various genres, including scripts, theories, and essays. He created a total of 14 plays throughout his life, including "Tso Po-t'ao" (佐伯桃), "A Box" (一口箱子), "Jade Guanyin" (碾玉觀音), and more. He also published books on theories of theatre and art criticism such as Drama and Literature and Art Criticism. His theatrical themes and forms were highly diverse, incorporating techniques from traditional Chinese theatre as well as Western theatre models to explore contemporary social realities.
