= Chen Xiuxi =

Taiwanese poet

Chen Hsiu-hsi Ch'en Hsiu-hsi Chen Xiuxi
- 陳秀喜
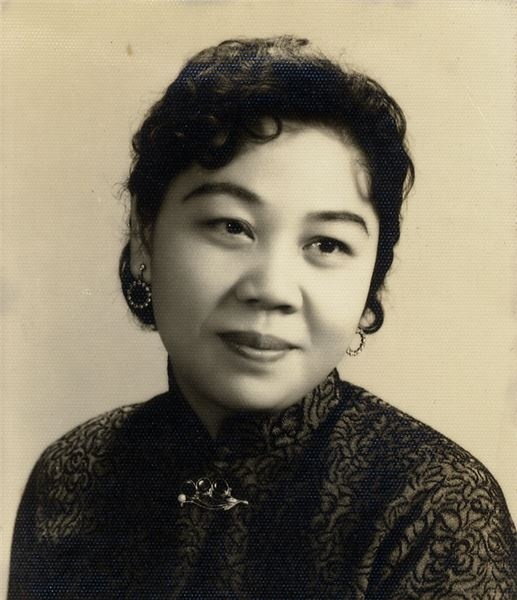
- Born: 1921
- Died: 1991 (aged 69–70)
- Occupation: Writer

Chen Hsiu-hsi (Chinese: 陳秀喜; Hsinchu, 1921–1991), also known as Chen Xiuxi, was a Taiwanese poet. She published her first book of poetry in Japanese in 1970.
