= Chou Meng-tieh =

Taiwanese poet and writer

Chou Meng-tieh 周夢蝶
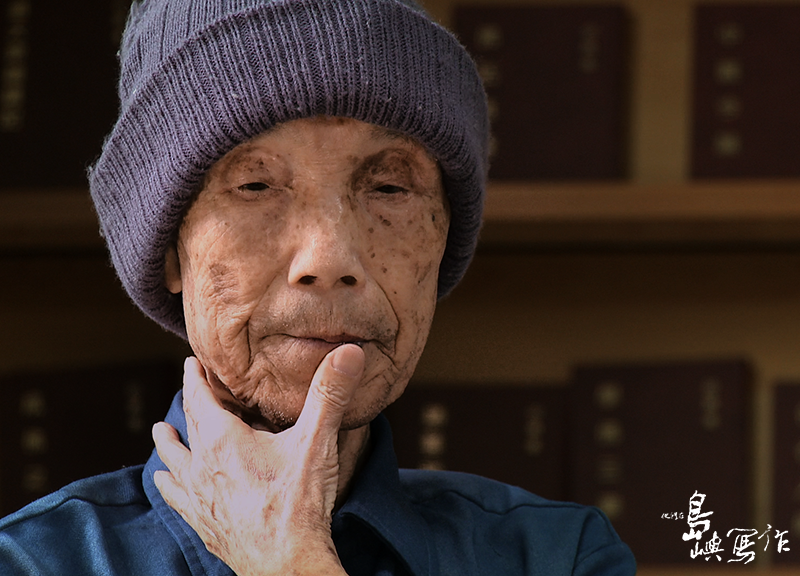
- Born: 29 December 1921; Xichuan County, Henan
- Died: 1 May 2014 (aged 92); Xindian, New Taipei, Taiwan
- Writing career
- Period: 1952–2014
- Notable works: Gudu guo [Lonely Country] (1959) and Huanhun cao [Goddess incarnate] (1965)
- Notable awards: Literature Laureate

Chou Meng-tieh (simplified Chinese: 周梦蝶; traditional Chinese: 周夢蝶; pinyin: Zhōu Mèngdié; 29 December 1921 – 1 May 2014) was a Taiwanese poet and writer. He lived in Tamsui District, New Taipei City.

== Biography ==
He was born Chou Chi-shu in Xichuan County, Henan in 1921. In 1948, Chou joined the China Youth Corps and was forced to drop out of school. He was sent to Taiwan following the defeat of Chiang Kai-shek's army in the Chinese Civil War, leaving his wife, two sons, and daughter behind in Mainland China. He settled in Tamsui District, New Taipei City.

Chou started writing in the Central Daily News and publishing poetry in 1952. He retired from the army in 1955. In 1959, he started selling books outside the Cafe Astoria in Taipei and published his first book of poetry entitled Lonely County. Chou's book stall became a gathering spot for well-known writers, such as Huang Chun-ming, Pai Hsien-yung, and Sanmao. Chou wrote often on the subjects of time, life, and death, and was influenced by Buddhism.

In 1980, the American magazine Orientations praised him as the "Amoy Street Prophet". During the same year, he was forced to close his book stall in front of Cafe Astoria due to gastric ulcer surgery. He was the first recipient of the National Culture and Arts Foundation Literature Laureate Award in 1997.

Chou died of pneumonia in New Taipei City on May 1, 2014 at the age of 92. His funeral was held twelve days later, with writers and politicians including Chang Show-foong, Lung Ying-tai, Timothy Yang, and Hsiang Ming in attendance.

A bilingual selection from Chou's poetry with English translations by Lloyd Haft, Zhou Mengdie: 41 Poems, was published by Azoth Books (Taiwan) in 2022.
