= Yu Kwang-chung =

Taiwanese poet (1928–2017)

- 余光中
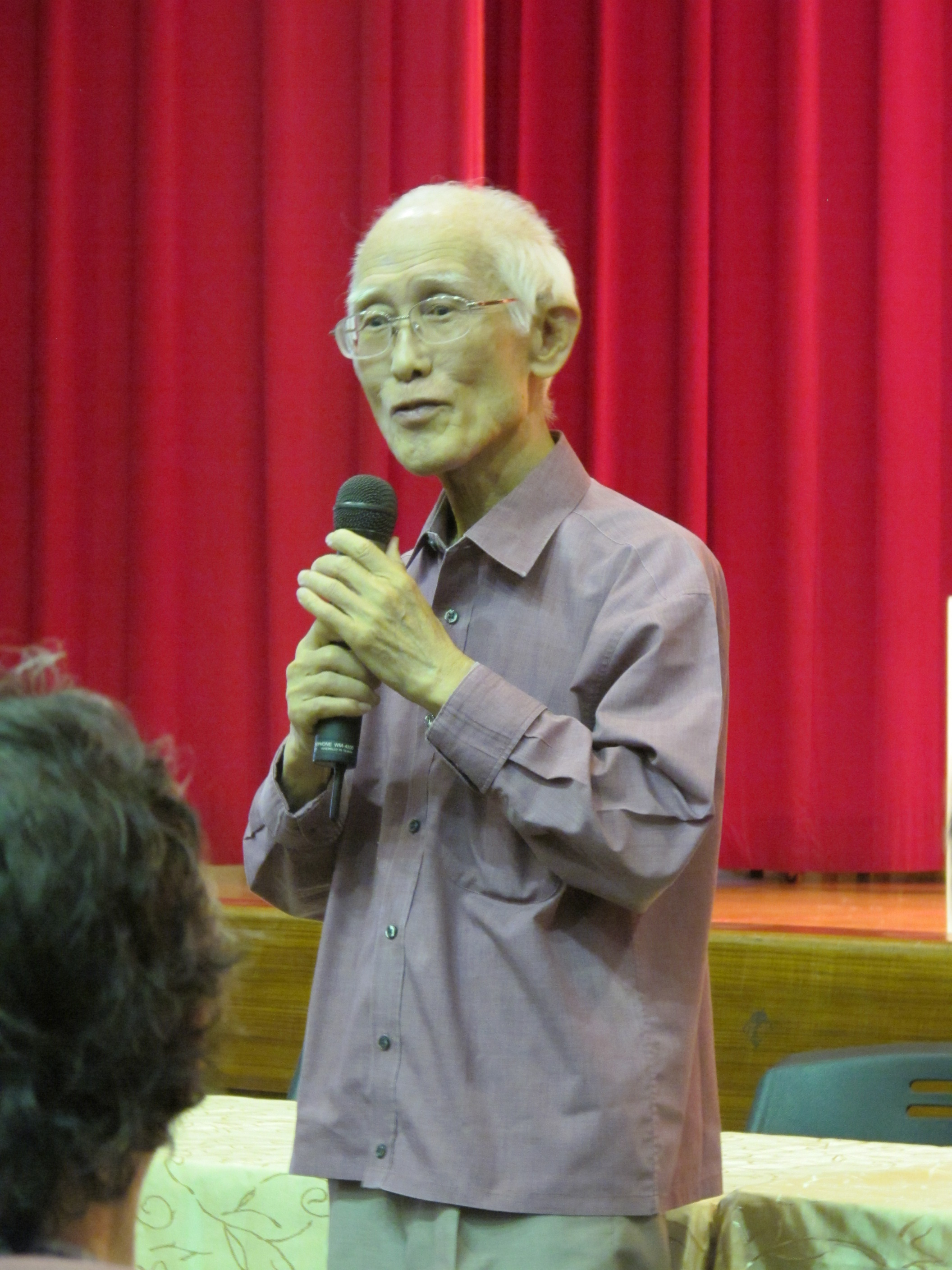
- Yu Kwang-chung in 2011
- Born: 21 October 1928; Nanking, Republic of China
- Died: 14 December 2017 (aged 89); Sanmin, Kaohsiung, Taiwan
- Education: National Taiwan University (BA); University of Iowa (MFA)
- Writing career
- Language: Mandarin and English
- Period: 1952–2017
- Notable works: Blue Feather; Cold War Years; Tug-of-war with Eternity
- Notable awards: Order of Brilliant Star

Yu Kwang-chung (Chinese: 余光中; 21 October 1928 – 14 December 2017), also romanised as Yu Guangzhong, was a Taiwanese writer, poet, educator and critic.

== Life ==
Yu was born in 1928 in Nanking to Yu Chaoying and Sun Xiujun, but fled with his family during the Japanese invasion. After returning to Nanjing many years later, he enrolled at the University of Nanking to major in English in 1947, before transferring to Amoy University. Due to the Communist victory in the Chinese Civil War, by 1950, Yu again was forced to flee with his family, this time to Taiwan via British Hong Kong with the Kuomintang-led Government. He enrolled at National Taiwan University and was one of the first students to graduate with a degree in foreign languages. He held a master of fine arts degree from the University of Iowa.

After graduation, he began his career as a university teacher in 1956. In 1959, Yu was recommended by Liang Shih-chiu and became a lecturer in the Department of English at National Taiwan Normal University. He was promoted to professor in 1971 and served as the chair of the Department of English and director of the graduate institute from 1980 to 1981. He became a reader within the Department of Chinese Language and Literature at The Chinese University of Hong Kong in 1974. He joined the faculty of National Sun Yat-sen University in 1985 as dean of arts. He taught in the United States, including at Gettysburg College. He was awarded a National Award for Arts in 1989 and a National Cultural Award in 2014.

Yu died on 14 December 2017 from pneumonia, at Chung-Ho Memorial Hospital in Kaohsiung. He was married to Fan Wo-tsun from 1956 until his death.

== Works ==
He published 17 poetry collections and 12 prose collections. Yu's poetry since the 1970s had focused on the theme of longing for China felt by many Mainland Chinese soldiers and Nationalist Government workers who fled to Taiwan after the Chinese Civil War.

Yu's works often focused on four fundamental aspects of literature; namely poetry, prose, translation, and commentary. Among writers using Chinese, Yu Kwang-chung became well-received to readers by showing innovative humour in his essays, exhibiting wit in his appreciations, and evincing his understanding of humanistic culture in his poetry.

A former professor at the Chinese language and literature faculty at the Chinese University of Hong Kong, Yu was internationally acclaimed for his command of traditional Chinese as well as modern literature. Besides his proficiency in the English language, for which he had been appointed professor at departments of English in Taiwan and the US, Yu was also an eager learner of languages, especially European ones. He spoke French, German, Spanish, and Italian, languages which he sometimes cited in his Chinese essays when juxtaposing the Chinese and Western cultures. He also learned Russian.

He targeted the Taiwanese literature movement in an August 1977 publication titled "The Wolf Is Coming", comparing nativist writings to "worker-peasant-soldier arts and literature" and linking them with Mao Zedong. Coupled with a Peng Ke editorial that appeared in the Central Daily News, Yu's piece engendered heavy criticism of nativist literature that lasted until January 1978.

== See also ==
- List of Taiwanese authors
