= Ya Hsien =

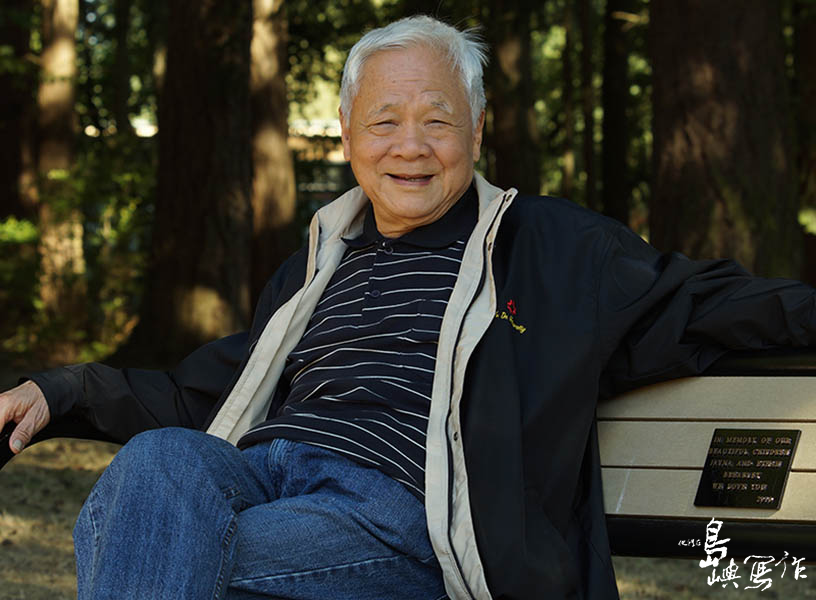
Ya Hsien in 2012

Ya Hsien (1932 – 11 October 2024), real name Wang Ching-lin, was a Taiwanese poet and scholar.

== Early life and education ==
Ya Hsien was born in Henan province in China in 1932. In 1949 his family moved to Taiwan as a result of the Chinese Civil War.

He first attended Fu Hsing Kang College gaining a degree in film and drama. He then attended the University of Wisconsin where he was awarded a master's degree.

== Career ==
His first poem, entitled "A Small Flower" (我是一勺靜美的小花朵), was published in 1954. Also in 1954 alongside fellow poets Chang Mo and Luo Fu he founded the Epoch Poetry Society which subsequently became highly influential.

He died on 11 October 2024 at the age of 92.
