= Rong Zi =

Chinese-born Taiwanese poet (1922–2021)

Wang Rongzi
- 王蓉芷
- Born: May 4, 1922; Jiangsu, Republic of China
- Died: January 9, 2021 (aged 98); Xuzhou, China
- Occupations: Writer, poet
- Writing career
- Pen name: Rong Zi 蓉子
- Period: 1953–2021
- Genres: Modern Chinese poetry, prose, children's literature

Rong Zi (Chinese: 蓉子) was the pen name of Wang Rongzi (Chinese: 王蓉芷; 4 May 1922 – 9 January 2021), a Chinese-born Taiwanese writer who is considered to be a leading modern day Taiwanese poet.

She was born in Jiangsu province and was educated in Christian primary and secondary schools. She continued her education at an agricultural college. She first worked as a teacher and then later at a radio station; she came to Taipei in 1949. She retired from the Taipei International Telecommunications Bureau in 1976.

She published her first book of poetry Qingniao ji (Blue Bird) in 1953. Rongzi married the poet Luo Men in 1955. The couple has been called "the Brownings of Chinese Modern Poetry". Besides several volumes of poetry, she also published essays and a volume of children's literature. She received national and international awards for her work.

Rong Zi returned to Jiangsu in 2019, to live with a relative. She died in Xuzhou on 9 January 2021.
