= Liang Jingfeng =

Taiwanese specialist on Taiwan nativist literature

Liang Jingfeng (梁景峰; also Liang Ching-feng, Liang Chingfeng; born 1944 in Gaoshu Township, Pingtung County) is a Taiwanese specialist on Taiwan nativist literature, especially native Taiwanese poetry since the 1920s. In 1979, Liang's, "Modern Aspects in the poetry of Heine" was dealt with in the Heine Jahrbuch 79 (Heine Yearbook), Stuttgart: Metzler, 1979, p. 263. – He is also mentioned in Wolfgang Bauer (1930–1997), Peng Chang, Michael Lackner, Das chinesische Deutschlandbild der Gegenwart: A. Deutsche Kultur, Politik und Wirtschaft im chinesischen Schrifttum 1970 – 1984. Stuttgart: Steiner-Verlag, Wiesbaden, 1989. He was a notable activist in the Tangwai movement that took to the streets in the mid-1970s in opposition to the KMT dictatorship and for democracy and the rights of workers, peasants and fishers. In the 1970s, he was very active in the Tangwai movement or Democracy Movement. Liang was active in the folk music movement scene and is known in Taiwan for writing the lyrics of the song Meilidao (Beautiful Island美麗島). This song, composed by Liang's friend, the painter, writer, and composer Li Shuangzi, was the anthem of the Tangwai (or Democracy) movement in the 1970s and later became almost the unofficial anthem of Taiwan.

== Education ==
Liang Jingfeng pursued advanced studies in German at Heidelberg University in Germany. In Germany, he translated poems by Bai Qiu (白萩 Pai Chiu, also Pai Ch'iu) together with Karlhans Frank. This small volume of poems was published in 1974. The translation marked Liang's commitment to poetry by Taiwan-born poets.

In 2011, Liang noted on his blog's website that he had returned to Bai Qiu, translating more of his poems – this time together with the German scholar Wolf Baus. Silvia Marijnissen mentions Liang's book Selected Historical Archives: New Taiwanese Literature Under Japanese Occupation. Part 4: Poetry.

== Career ==
Liang returned to Taiwan in 1976 and obtained a teaching position at the German Department of Tamkang University. Liang focused on Heine.

He also focused on Taiwan's critical literature, especially poetry that had often been leftist and anti-colonialist during the period of Japanese colonial rule. He published "Who is Lai He?" (賴和是誰？) in the leftist democratic opposition magazine Xiachao 夏潮 under the pseudonym Liang Demin in 1976.

His students read stories and novels by Xiangtu Wenxue authors such as Wang Tuoh, Wang Tuoh, Yang Qingchu (楊青矗) and Chen Yingzhen. Chen had been imprisoned by the government for "subversive activity" between 1968 and 1973 and was again imprisoned in 1979, in the context of the crackdown unleashed after the Formosa incident, also known as the Kaohsiung Incident. In this, Liang paralleled the practice of other teachers at the Department of German and the English Department, most notably Wang Jinping (scholar and activist) (Wang Chinping 王津平). In 1977 or 1978, Wang was dismissed by the university because of his political activities; he then operated a bookshop in Tamshui and a hostel that let him keep in touch with students. Another subversive teacher was Liang's colleague Wei Lan-de (魏蓝德) who motivated students to write essays about Wang Tuoh (Wang Tuo 王拓;, b. 1944), Chen Ying-chen (Chen Yingzhen 陳映真, b. 1937), Yang Ch’ing-ch’u (Yang Qingchu 楊清矗;, b.1940), Wu Cho-liu (Wu Zhuoliu 吳濁流 (1900–1976)), or Hwang Chun-ming (Huang Chunming 黃春明). Wei also edited a Chinese-English journal called Jietou/Street - a name that had been suggested by Liang Jingfeng. The journal was banned in 1977. Since 1976, Wang Jinping, the feminist activist and Tamkang teacher Lee Yuan-chen (Li Yuanzhen 李元貞 – the founder of Women Awakening), Liang and their friend Li Shuangze (李雙澤) formed what Tao Wei - the liberal chairman of Tamkang's German Department at the time - called, with a smile, a "Gang of Four". They took a stand in the debate about xiangtu wenxue (Taiwan Nativist Literature that was attacked by the national media and they furthered a nativist folk music revival on campus. At the time, Liang Jingfeng pseudonymously published articles related to questions of Taiwanese culture in journals close to the Tangwai movement, such as the influential radical magazine Xiachao夏潮 (Summer Tide, often referred to as China Tide.), but perhaps also in 前進雜誌 (Advance! Magazine; the name of the magazine refers to a poem written in the 1930s by Tian Han, the "March of the Volunteers" ) and in Formosa Zazhi ( 福摩薩雜誌 Formosa Magazine).

== Taiwanese folk music movement ==
After his arrival in Tamshui in 1976, Liang was determined to help friends such as Li Shuangze to push ahead with their attempt, started in 1975, to convert the Western-oriented Campus Folk Music Movement into a socially critical folk song movement of singer-songwriters find an audience eager to embrace and develop their own songs. As one of the critics of non-political English-language folk rock (and of often quite sentimental pop music), Liang, just like his friend and collaborator Li Shuangze(李雙澤, b. 1949 – d. 1977), resented the increasingly dominant uncritical Westernization of Chinese and regional Taiwanese culture, including its musical culture, and discovered locally rooted issues that could be addressed in new Chinese language folk songs. But the musical form found for instance by Li Shuangze remained partly indebted to that of simple Western tunes. Liang continues to celebrate his regional Taiwanese heritage. In the mid-1970s, when he started to get involved in the folk music movement, he craved however, much like Li Shuangze and others, a folk song movement faithful to China's – and insofar as possible, the island's – heritage. He saw in folk singers like Chen Da a genuine expression of the people's unalienated culture on the island of Taiwan that was still governed by a regime that facilitated cultural Americanization, despite avowed determination to achieve a Neo-Confucian Renaissance.

Probably in 1976 or 1977, Liang wrote the lyrics for the song "Meilidao" (Beautiful Island) that was composed by Li Shuangze. The song became the key song of the radically democratic opposition movement and for many, the unofficial anthem of Taiwan. The song's name became the name of a critical opposition magazine, Meilidao.

Other songs created by the two were "We are the Young China" and "Little Friend, Do you know where the rice comes from?" (and the fish, and your clothing) – the song continued, saying that it is the result of the work of the peasants, the fisher folk, the workers. The songs were made famous by Li and then, after his death, by Yang Zujun, who was in the mid- to late 1970s a student at Tamkang University (淡江大學 ).

During 1978–1979, Liang Jingfeng distributed cassette tapes with these and other – often banned – songs on campus. The four Tamkang radicals were the factual organizers of the concert that was to feature, among others, their friend, aboriginal singer Hu Defu (胡德夫). Because Hu Defu could not appear (probably for health reasons), Li Shuangzi replaced him, talking about the cultural alienation that was implied when young people in Taiwan sang American folk songs (in the context of a so-called Campus Folk Movement) while ignoring their own heritage. When Li symbolically smashed a Coke bottle (a symbol of Western cultural penetration) on stage, the act was lambasted in the press as the Coca Cola Incident (Coca Cola incident 可口可樂 事件 or Tamkang incident 淡江事件). Due to the Tangwai scholars, Chen Da, an old but soon noted Taiwanese folk singer, was invited to perform on campus in Tamkang. It was "a closeness to the regionalist culture" that linked the four Tamkang activists Lee Yuan-chen (李元貞), Liang, Li and Wang Jinping to Native critical and realist literature, to Taiwanese folk music (Chen Da), and to the Democracy movement. This activism became less apparent, and was perhaps temporarily scaled down in the wake of the crackdown linked to the Meilidao incident ( 美麗島事件 ) in 1979. In 1987, many years after Li Shuangzi's premature death in 1977, and thus in the period when Martial law in Taiwan was about to be suspended, Liang and Lee Yuan-chen published his collected works, together with a biography.

== Taiwan literature ==
Liang was described as a "Germanist" in a German publication and has published much on German literature. He has researched and published on Taiwan's literary heritage. As the faculty website of National Dong Hwa University points out, Liang compiled 日據下臺灣新文學──詩選集 (Rì jù xià táiwān xīn wénxué ──shī xuǎn jí /The New Literature in Taiwan under the Japanese Occupation – a poetry anthology) in 1979. He edited the book with Li Nanheng (李南衡). He is the author of Xiāngtǔ yǔ xiàndài (鄉土與現代 Native and modern).

After Liang had published "Lai Ho shih shei" (賴和是誰？Who is Lai He?) in Xiachiao (夏潮 Hsia-ch’ao) #6, Sept. 1976, he published Taiwan xiandai shi de qibu Lai He, Zhang Wojun he Yang Hua de hanwen baihuashi (台灣現代詩的起步賴和, 張我軍和楊華的漢文白話詩 / The Beginnings of Taiwan's modern poetry: Lai He, Zhang Wojun and Yang Hua's Chinese poetry in the vernacular language) in 1994.

Ingrid Schuh's book 臺灣作家楊青矗小说研究 年以前 1975 / (Taiwan zuojia Yang Qingchu xiaoshuo yanjiu 1975 nian yiqian / A Study of Taiwanese Writer Yang Qingchu's Novels Before 1975) also mentions Liang's research and publication activity.

Liang published on Ye Shitao (葉石濤, b. 1925), Yang Qingchu (楊青矗, b. 1940) etc., and together with Chen Mingtai an article entitled "Der Wiederaufbau der modernen Lyrik. – Deutsche und japanische Nachkriegslyrik."

== Selected bibliography ==
Jiang's works include:

- "Chūnguāng guān bù zhù—lùn Yáng Kuí de xiǎoshuō <<é māmā chūjià>>" ( 春光關不住—論楊逵的小說 "鵝媽媽出嫁" / Spring cannot be forbidden – Yang Kui's story "Mother Goose marries"); journal article, Sept. 1976).
- "Shénme bùshì xiàndài shī " ( 什麼不是現代詩 / What is not modern poetry), journal article, Oct. 1976.
- "Hǎi Niè (Heinrich Heine) shī zhōng de xiàndài shī zhì" ( 海涅(Heinrich Heine)詩中的現代詩質 / Heinrich Heine: Poems with a modern poetry quality), journal article, Nov. 1977 pp. 143–177. (This journal article is referred to in German as: "Moderne Aspekte in der Lyrik Heines." It was discussed in 1979 in the German-language "Heine Yearbook".)
- Lài Hé shì shuí (賴和是誰 / Who is Lai Ho). A small book of which only one copy was printed, March 1979.
- "Shénme bùshì xiàndài shī " ( 什麼不是現代詩 / What is not modern poetry), journal article, March 1979.
- "Hǎidǎo zhīgē: Lùn rì jù shíqí Táiwān xīnshī " (海島之歌 : 論日據時期臺灣新詩 / Island Song: On Taiwan 's New Poetry in the Period of Japanese Occupation), journal article, 11 March 1979. (= "Hai-tao chih ko" (Island Song), in: Shih hsuan-chi (Selected Anthology of Poetry), Vol. 4 of Jih-chü-hsia T’ai-wan hsin wen-hsueh.)
- "Hǎi Niè (Heinrich Heine) shī zhōng de xiàndài tè" (期刊論文, 海涅(Heinrich Heine)詩中的現代特 / Heine's poetry ( ... )), journal article, June 1979.
- "Dé Táiwān rì jù shíqí xiǎoshuō zhōng de zhímín zhě yǔ bèi zhímín zhě" (德臺灣日據時期小說中的殖民者與被殖民者 / The Colonized and the Colonialists in the Japanese Novels during the Japanese Occupation ), journal article, Sept. 1979.
- "Ai de gùshì: Tán <<yàzhōu xiàndài shījí>>" (Love story: talk about the "Asian modern poetry collection), journal article, June 1982.
- "Lādīng měizhōu wénxué de tànsuǒ" (拉丁美洲文學的探索/ The Journal of Latin American Literature), journal article, Jan.1983.
- "Heine über Goethe," in: Deutsche Studien # 18, 1984, pp. 17–21 (published by Deutsche Abteilung des Tamkang College and mentioned by George F. Peters, on p. 300. See: George F. Peters, Die große Heide No.2, Heinrich Heine and the Levels of His Goethe Reception, New York (etc.) : Peter Lang Inc., 1989.)
- " (昨日之夢 : 西德學生運動 / Yesterday's Dreams : West Germany's student movement), journal article, July 1986.
- Heinrich Heine und die Moderne, Conference papers, Tamkang University, Oct. 1992.
- "Fānyì kèchéng zài déyǔ jiàoxué de gōngnéng" ( 翻譯課程在德語教學的功能 / Teaching German translation courses), Conference papers, Tamkang University, Jan. 1993.
- Taiwan xiandai shi de qibu Lai He, Zhang Wojun he Yang Hua de hanwen baihuashi. (台灣現代詩的起步賴和, 張我軍和楊華的漢文白話詩 / The Beginnings of Taiwan's modern poetry: Lai He, Zhang Wojun and Yang Hua's Chinese poetry in the vernacular language.) Hsinchu/Xinzhu : Guoli qinghua daxue ( 國立清華大學) 1994.
- "Déguó liúwáng wényì zài Zhōngguó" (德國流亡文藝在中國 / German Exiles in China), Conference papers, Tamkang University, May 1999.
- "Déyǔ gēqǔ kèchéng shèjì yǔ jiàocái zhī biānxuǎn – chūbù bàogào (2000)" (德語歌曲課程設計與教材之編選-初步報告(2000) / German Course Design and Compilation of Textbooks – A Preliminary Report (2000)), Conference papers, Tamkang University, 2000.
- "Yì zhě yǔ jiàoxué" (譯者與教學 / Being a translator and teaching), in the Proceedings of a conference at the Dept. of German Language and Literature, Tamkang University, June 2002.
- "Taiwan: kulturelle Perspektiven einer Weltinsel im Prozess der Globalisierung", conference papers, Tamkang University, June 2002.
- Schwabbauer, Monika; Tao Wei (陶緯); Liang Jingfeng (梁景峰); Guo Mingfong (郭名鳳); Lai Lixiu (賴麗琇); Wei Rongzhi蕭時雄 (eds.), Qīngsōng xué déyǔ wénfǎ (輕鬆學德語文法 / E輕鬆學德語文法asy to Learn: German Grammar); book, 2002.
- Fēngjǐng de biànqiān: Déyǔ wén xué pínglùn xuǎn" ( 風景的變遷 : 德語文學評論選 / A Changing Landscape: A Review of the German Literary Criticism (in German); book, 2006.
- Heine: Neuer Frühling. (Chinese translation with annotations); research report, Dept. of German Language and Literature, Tamkang University, 2011.

=== Translations ===
- Bai Qiu, Pai Chiu : Feuer auf Taiwan: Gedichte. Transl. by Liang Jingfeng梁景峰 and Karlhans Frank. Pforzheim : Verlag Harlekin-Presse, 1974.
- Elias Canetti (Jieyi Kaneiti節譯 卡內提), Miwang (迷惘, Chin. transl. of Die Blendung); transl. by Liang Jingfeng. Taipei台北 : Guangfu shuju 光復書局 1988.
- Deyu qing shi xuan (德語情詩選 Deutsche Liebesgedichte, a selection of German love poetry), translated and with a preface by Liang Jingfeng. Published in the journal Li 笠, issue # 251 / 2006. (Preface: , according to Liang Chingfeng's blog. This webpage of zic.com cannot be accessed anymore.) – The "Li Poetry Society" was already notable between 1964 and 1977. The journal was started in June 1964.
- [Translation projected in Dec. 2010 and announced in the blog of Liang Chingfeng; the work is perhaps already published:] Heinrich Heine (Hai Nie 海涅), Neuer Frühling. Meine Handschrift / 海涅, 新春集. 我的手筆 (compiled and edited by Liang Jingfeng)

On 28 December 2010 Liang commented: "Habe vor, den ersten Zyklus (Neuer Frühling) der Sammlung "Neue Gedichte" (1844) von Heinrich Heine (1797–1856) zu übersetzen. Die Gedichte sind meist geschrieben zwischen 1827 und 1831, sind also ein Bindeglied des "Buch der Lieder" (1827) und der späteren neuen Gedichte. Man liest wieder die Gedichte, und wenn die Nacht etwas lang wird, schreibt man die Texte mit der Hand ab. Die Handschrift ist heute wohl ein altmodischer Zeitvertreib. Aber vielleicht versteht man die Gedichte so besser. Hier sind die ersten Proben. Hoffe, dass es einen neuen Frühling für jeden Menschen gibt, Brot, Rosen und Zuckererbsen."

=== Critical editions ===
- Heinrich Heine, Neuer Frühling. Meine Handschrift. Hǎi niè, xīnchūn jí. Wǒ de shǒubǐ / 海涅, 新春集. 我的手筆(Heine poems, translated and edited by Liang Jingfeng)
- Dang ai fasheng shi... Xiyang shige changpian zhan (當愛發聲時... 西洋詩歌唱片展 / When Love speaks... Sound Disc Exhibition of Western Poetry and Songs), edited by Liang Jingfeng. Tamshui/Taipei: Tamkang University Library 淡江大學覺生圖書館, 2005. A4. 55 pp.

(Content 內容: Foreword 1; The Song of Songs 4; Greek: 7 (Sappho, Elytis ); English: 10 (Chaucer, Shakespeare, Burns, Byron, Poe, Whitman, Dickinson); German: 19 (Walther, Hildegard, Carmina Burana, Luther, Goethe, Schiller, Hölderlin, Eichendorff, Müller, Heine, Rilke, Hesse, Brecht); French: 36 (Villon, Ronsard, Baudelaire, Rimbaud, Verlaine, Apollinaire, Aragon, Prévert); Spanish: 46 (Lorca, Alberti, Machado, Borges, Neruda))
