= Wang Jinping (scholar and activist) =

Wang Jinping or Wang Chin-ping (Chinese: 王津平; pinyin: Wáng Jīnpíng; 1946 – 7 September 2019) was a scholar and president of the "China Union for Unification". He was a noted activist of the Tangwai movement in touch with many writers of the Taiwan Nativist Literature movement since the mid 1970s. He was also, together with Liang Jingfeng and a few others on the Tamkang campus in Tamsui, a key mover of a new political direction in native folk music.

== A tutor and then a young activist teacher in Tamkang ==
Wang Jinping was first a tutor and then a full-time teacher at the Dept. of English of Tamkang College of Arts and Sciences, now Tamkang University, in Tamsui in the 1970s.

In 1974, when Wang was a tutor at Tamkang, he met Malieyafusi Monaneng (b. 1956), a member of one of Taiwan's aboriginal tribes whose Chinese name is Mo Na-neng (莫那能). This heralded Wang Jinping's and Liang Jingfeng's as well as Lee Yuan-chen's and Lee Shuang-tse's interested in aboriginal culture, especially aboriginal folk songs.

Together with two other members of the Faculty of Literature, Lee Yuan-chen (Li Yuanzhen 李元貞 - the founder of Women Awakening), Liang Jingfeng, and the noted composer, poet, painter and folksinger Lee Shuang-tse, Wang Jinping belonged to the group on the Tamkang campus in Tamsui that was called the "gang of four" radical pro-democracy activists. Thus, he was one of those who gave rise to the Tamkang-Xiachiao (China Tide) Line of the Folk Movement. This political line, pursued within the new folk song (xin mingge新民歌 ) movement, was propagated by the Xiachao Magazine f(夏潮) founded in 1976, a Tangwai movement magazine in which the four Tamkang-based pro-democracy activists published articles at the time.

Soon, the aboriginal singer and blues poet Hu Defu also joined the dissident group which then began to pioneer xin minge (新民歌 new folk songs) in Taiwan.

Already in 1974, Mo Naneng, who later became a noted aboriginal poet and aboriginal rights activist, had "spent about one or two months in Wang Jinping's hostel". Mo then "traveled with some Han friends (i.e. Chinese friends) who cared about Taiwan's aborigines" - including Wang Jinping – to areas with aboriginal villages, in search of their culture and music.

While Mo had kindled an interest in aboriginal culture in Wang Jinping and Wang's Mainland Chinese, Taiwanese, and Hakka friends, it was above all Wang Jinping who aroused an interest in Taiwan Nativist Literature in Mo. And thus, Mo " got to know Wang Tuoh, Su Ching-li, Lee Shuang-tse, Chen Yingzhen, Yang Ching-chu, Huang Chun-ming, Wang Lixia, Chen Guoying, Chen Wan-chen, Yang Zujun, Lin Cheng-chieh, Chang Fu-chung, Sung Tung-wen and others, many of them in the Tangwai movement" – meeting them personally thanks to Wang Jinping, in 1977-1978.

Like Liang Jingfeng, Wang Jinping was a very close friend of Lee Shuang-tse. He also formed close links with the blues poet and aboriginal singer Hu Defu in the 1970s.

In December 1976, the radical Tamkang-based pro-democracy and pro-Taiwan Nativist Literature activists, including Wang Jinping, were pulling the strings that led to the so-called Coca Cola Incident (Tamkang Incident). They motivated the student body to invite Hu Defu to perform at the annual English-language Western folk concert at Tamkang. And when Hu Defu could not come, Lee Shuang-tse stepped in as the replacement, went on stage, asked the other singers and the audience, Where are our songs? Why don't you sing our songs? And then, smashing a Coke bottle, a symbol of CocaCola-ization, on stage, shouted: "We should sing our songs!!" There was a storm of criticism of Lee Shuang-tse's act, in the KMT-controlled press, and it made the new folk song movement that returned to the roots really famous, islandwide. It really pushed it forward.

Soon after that, Wang Jinping, Liang Jingfeng and Lee Yuan-chen managed to get Chen Da invited to the Tamkang campus by the students, and then they started to distribute clandestine tapes with new folk songs – many of which had soon been banned by the GIO censors.

Then, the group of four, supported by other close friends, organized a "new folk song" concert in Taipei New Park today renamed 228 Peace Memorial Park, in memory of the bloody massacres committed by the KMT's army and military police in Kaohsiung, Taipei, Chiayi, Keelung and many other places under the eyes of their American supervisors on 28 February 1947 and shortly after that fateful day, killing at least 30,000 human beings (a "conservative estimate").

In 1977 or 1978, Wang Jinping was fired by Tamkang College which bowed to KMT pressure. It was because of Wang's outspoken pro-Tangwai movement positions that he did not hide from the students. In addition to embracing the idea of unification with China (but in a way that was very different from the KMT's "re-conquest" ideas), Wang was also an internationalist and he cared for Third World literature, especially African literature. He thought highly of Basil Davidson. There were informers among the students who wrote reports on what faculty members and students said, and handed them in to the army officers stationed for that purpose on campus. Wang kept in touch with his students. In addition to the boarding house, he now had also a bookstore in Tamsui that was frequented by the students and that offered books by Taiwan Nativist Literature authors and sold magazines like Xiachao.

When Wang Jingping's friend Mo Naneng had a severe accident in 1979 that implied eye damage and then turned him blind, it was noted left-wing author Chen Yimgzhen who personally "taught him braille writing", which signalled the beginning of Mo's career as a writer.

Wang Jinping, just like the others of the small group at Tamkang and like most writers of the Taiwan Nativist Literature movement, wholeheartedly supported aboriginal rights. When Mo and Hu Defu succeeded to establish the Taiwan Aboriginal Peoples' Rights Promotion Association in late 1984, some two and half years before Martial Law was lifted by the KMT regime, Wang was on their side.

== Breach with old companions of the struggle for democracy? ==
While the four democracy activists dreamed of a united China in 1976, hoping that thus their goals of full democracy for the common people and real social justice would be fulfilled, Liang Jingfeng has since been quoted very often as saying that "my China is Taiwan..." In contrast to this position, which favors Taiwan independence, Wang Jinping and Chen Yingzhen have clung to the dream of democratic unification of the motherland. Recently, Chen Yingzhen critiqued the Taiwan independence movement by saying that the Taiwanese majority should not claim victim status vis-a-vis the Chinese (on the island or on the mainland) because both the mainlanders and the Taiwanese had suppressed and colonized Taiwan's aboriginal population. Chen Yingzhen also put in question the "Hoklo-centrist" - thus Taiwanese "nativist hegemony" that emerged "in the 1980s and 1990s." Wang Jinping agrees with these views and critiques the Taidu movement or Taiwan independence movement, too.

Wang Jinping became the leader of the "China Union for Unification" - an organization established in 1988., in which Chen Yingzhen also played a leading role.

Wang was a professor of Tamkang University – the school that once was compelled by the KMT to fire him.

Wang died in Beijing, China on 7 September 2019.
