= Taiwan Nativist Literary Debate =

The Taiwan Nativist Literary Debate, initiated in the 1970s, was a debate exploring the development and direction of writing in Taiwanese literature. This period is commonly referred to as the Nativist Literary Debate, particularly between April 1977 and January 1978.

This debate not only discussed whether Taiwanese literature should reflect the reality of Taiwan's society, but also served as a comprehensive assessment of politics, economics, society, and literature in Taiwan's post-war period. It sparked writers to reflect on the ideas and stances of one another.

Following the Kuomintang-led nationalist government’s retreat to Taiwan in 1949, they assumed control of the island, during which time they advocated for traditional Chinese and anti-communist literature. Nativist literature at the time, which portrayed rural life in a simple, uncritical tone, was generally considered to be outside of the literary mainstream.

In the 1970s, nativist literature began to adopt realism and address societal issues, gradually gaining prominence in the Taiwanese literary scene. A magazine article authored by Wang Tuo (王拓)in 1977 put forth the proposition that urban life should be incorporated into the subject matter of nativist literature, along with the suggestion that it be renamed "Realism Literature."

Some who disagree with this viewpoint, such as writers Yin Cheng-hsiung (銀正雄) and Chu Hsi-ning (朱西寧), argued that nativist literature had turned into an expression of hatred, even with concerns that it advocated Taiwan's independence.

Certain writers who aligned with official stances held the view that nativist literature exhibited a certain degree of left-leaningness and resembled the literature of the Chinese class struggle. These debates captured the attention of the government and led to criticisms directed at nativist literature. Finally, in January 1978, the government convened National Military Literature and Arts Day (國軍文藝大會), bringing temporary closure to the controversy.

The anti-official ideological faction is not uniformly cohesive in its stance, with the most significant divergence being the disparity between the pro-Mainland China (such as Chen Ying-chen [陳映真]) and pro-Taiwan positions. It was not until the 1980s, with the pro-democracy movement advocating for political freedoms, that the conflicts between these two positions among nativist literature writers were officially ignited.
