= Guo Qiusen =

Taiwanese writer

- 郭秋生
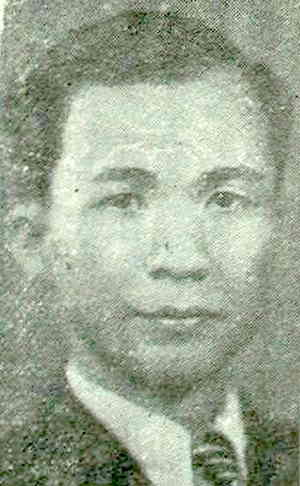
- Born: 8 February 1904; Xinzhuang, New Taipei
- Died: 19 August 1980 (aged 76)
- Occupation: Writer

Guo Qiusen (Chinese: 郭秋生; pinyin: Guō Qiūshēng; Pe̍h-ōe-jī: Koeh Chhiu-seng; Hepburn: Kaku Shūsei) (1904–1980), born in Japanese Taiwan in the area of Taihoku (modern-day Xinzhuang, New Taipei, Taiwan), was a Taiwanese writer. He wrote under the pseudonym Qiusen. He was a strong supporter of the language movement started by Huang Shihui.

== Life ==
Guo Qiusheng graduated from Jimei Middle School in Xiamen, China, and later worked at the Jiangshan Building. Because of his contact with literati in the workplace, he was quite talented in writing. In 1930, the Taiwan Literary and Art Association was established, and Guo Qiusheng became the secretary-general. Starting from July 7, 1931, he wrote articles in "Taiwan News" to support Huang Shihui's Taiwanese language movement. In his article of more than 20,000 words, "A Proposal for the Construction of Taiwanese Vernacular", he clearly stated that the Taiwanese language should be written in Chinese characters, in addition to Japanese literature and Mandarin literature. This is to enlighten the proletariat and consolidate Taiwan's national consciousness. In addition, in this article, it is also advocated that if Chinese characters cannot fully express the multi-syllabic Taiwanese language, new characters should be created when there are sounds but no characters. In addition, he also advocated the implementation of Taiwanese language reform, consistency between speech and writing, and unified pronunciation.

Afterwards, Guo Qiusheng founded "Nanyin" and opened a column in the magazine, trying to write Taiwanese folk songs in direct Chinese translation to practice the efforts of Taiwanese language writing. However, due to the implementation of the policy of imperialization by the Taiwan Governor-General's Office and the outbreak of the Second Sino-Japanese War, the Taiwanese language movement was forced to stop. After the war, due to the political atmosphere, he stopped writing and went into business.

== literary work ==
In addition to trying his hand at writing in Taiwanese, Guo Qiu Sheng's other works are also quite popular, including the essays "Social Portraits" and "Street Portraits", and the short stories "Jumping Crowns", "Cats", "Ghosts", and "Wangdu Township".

== Related research ==
=== Doctoral and Master's Dissertations ===
Using the "Taiwan Doctoral and Master's Dissertation Knowledge Value-added System", as of October 3, 2011, the following dissertations focus on Guo Qiusheng, his works, and his literary ideas:

Liao Qizheng, "Taiwanese Local Language Movement in the 1930s", National Cheng Kung University/Institute of History and Philology/78/Master.

Zhang Guihua, "Literature in the Age of Depression - The Literary Appeal of Nanyin in 1932", National Cheng Kung University/Department of History/88/Master.

Chen Yunru, "A Study on Guo Qiusheng's Literary Process (1929-1937)", Soochow University/Department of Chinese Literature/90/Master.

Li Yamin, "A Study on Taiwanese Language and Folk Custom Writing in Taiwanese Novels during the Japanese Occupation Period - Taking "Matchmaker", "Prince Pig", and "Ghost" as Examples", National Chung Hsing University/Institute of Taiwan Literature/97/Master.

Liu Mengyi, "Theme Consciousness and Taiwanese Writing in Taiwanese Novels during the Japanese Occupation Period - Taking the Works of Lai He, Cai Qiutong, and Guo Qiusheng as Examples", National Chung Hsing University / Institute of Taiwanese Literature / 97 / Master.

=== Thesis Collection ===
Using the "Taiwan Literature, History and Philosophy Thesis Collection Index System" to search, as of October 8, 2011, the known ones are:

Guo Qiusheng, "Listen to Ruan Yihui's Voice Again", "Taiwanese Literature Movement Written Hokkien".

Shi Shu, "Feeling the World - Taiwan's Alternative Novels in the 1930s", "Modern and Contemporary Chinese Literature and Cultural Changes".

=== Journal Articles ===
Using the "Taiwan Journal Article Index System" to search, as of October 8, 2011, the known ones are:

Zhang Henghao, "The Warrior of Taiwanese Writing - Guo Qiusheng", "Taipei Pictorial" November 2000.

=== Symposium Papers ===
Liu Shuqin, "Hardworking and Poverty: A Critique of the Taiwan Expo in Taipei City Tragedy Novels", presented at the "First International Academic Symposium on Cultural Flow and Knowledge Dissemination: Methodology and Case Studies" hosted by the Institute of Taiwanese Literature, National Taiwan University.

=== Books ===
Using the "National Book Bibliographic Information Network" to search, as of October 8, 2011, no book has been published that studies Guo Qiusheng and his works.

== Related entries ==
Literary publications: Vanguard, Nanyin

Important events involved: Taiwan nativist literature

Huang Shihui, Liao Hanchen
