= Coca Cola Incident (Tamkang Incident) =

The Coca Cola Incident (Chinese: 可口可樂事件) was the term that surfaced in December 1976 in Taiwan after a performance against loss of identity. It occurred on the campus of Tamkang University, then known as the Tamkang College of Arts and Sciences, in Tamsui, a small port city in Northern Taiwan.

On December 3, 1976, a “Western folk concert” (Xiyang minyao yanchang hui 西洋民謠演唱會) presenting folk songs in English, sung by singers from Taiwan, took place. It had been organized formally by the Student Activity Center of Tamkang College. But the faculty of languages and literature members Lee Yuan-chen (李元貞), Liang Jingfeng (梁景峰), Wang Jinping (scholar and activist) (王津平) and their friend, Lee Shuang-tse (李雙澤) had been the driving force.

The concert started normally with English-language folk songs. Xu Zhiyuan (許志源) notes that “the prestigious Tao Hsiao-ching (陶曉清)” was “in charge” as MC. Chair.)

The blues poet, Hu Defu (胡德夫), had been scheduled as one of the singers, could not perform because of an injury due to a fight the day before. Lee then step in to perform for him. When Li got on stage, he was holding a Coca Cola bottle in his hand and loudly addressed the audience. "I went to the United States, and I went to Spain; young people around the world are drinking Coca-Cola and are singing songs that are in English,” he said, according to one report. And then he added, “May I ask you where our own songs are?" And ended by shouting, “Why don't you sing your own songs? Let's sing our own songs!” Uttering these words, he smashed the Coke bottle – something that everyone clearly understood as a symbolic gesture of protest.

Then he began to sing the folk song “Bu po wang" (补破网, Borderless Realm, also known as Fixing A Fishing Net or Repair the net – a metaphoric allusion to the net torn apart between China and Taiwan), continuing with the "Sun Yat-sen Memorial Song" and a number of Taiwanese folk songs. It aroused the audience in an enthusiastic “uproar”, but on that evening, there was also those who did not agree and who booed.

The symbolic meaning of smashing a Coke bottle and the significance of the song sung right after this Coca Cola bottle was smashed, was well understood by the KMT-controlled media. They hit back immediately, creating the terms Coca Cola Incident and Tamkang Incident for what had just happened on the Tamkang campus. It was clear that they wanted to intimidate Li Shuangze and those who had dared to applaud his act of protest.

The result of this media campaign was unforeseen by them. They made Lee's protest known island-wide. And thus, the Coca Cola “incident ... at the concert in Tamkang University inspired a lot of students, and in this way the slogan 'sing songs in our own language' was introduced.” It turned into the Let's Sing Our Own Songs Movement, and young people began to write their own songs in their own language.

But it was not only the desire to sing folk songs in native dialects languages, thus above all in Taiwanese and Hakka, as well as in standard Chinese that was strengthened. The allusive songs that were sung began also to express a spirit of defiance and opposition to the dictatorial KMT regime. Thus, with the spirit of identity that was strengthened, both Taiwan Nativist Literature and the pro-democracy Tangwai movement received a boost.

Today, a memorial to Lee Shuang-tse has been erected officially on the Tamkang Campus in Tamshui.
