= The South Poetry =

Chinese literary magazine in Taiwan

The South Poetry (Chinese: 南方詩集) was a popular classical Chinese literary magazine in Taiwan under Japanese rule. It was published for nearly a decade and was a rare example of a comprehensive classical Chinese literary magazine during the official restrictions on general use of classical Chinese in 1937. It went through various names, starting as Wind and Moon (風月), later renamed as Wind and Moon Magazine (風月報), The South (南方) and finally The South Poetry (南方詩集).

Editors primarily consisted of traditional literati, but as the objectives of the publication changed, it incorporated editors, authors, and readers from various generations within the classical Chinese literary community in Taiwan. Its content also covered a wide range, including classical Chinese poetry, traditional Chinese literature, and new literary works of Chinese vernacular. The evolution of its editorial style is as follows:

- Wind and Moon (風月) Period: During this period, the magazine was associated with the traditional literati organization “Wind and Moon Club” (風月俱樂部) in Taipei's Dadaocheng area. It was published every third, sixth, and ninth day of the month. In addition to classical Chinese poetry of Taiwan, it featured mostly traditional Chinese literature of Taiwan, as well as images of Taiwanese geisha.
- Wind and Moon Magazine (風月報) Period: This was the only classical Chinese language publication in Taiwan after the abolition of classical Chinese columns in newspapers in 1937. Initially, its style resembled Wind and Moon (風月), but later, the magazine started leaning towards new and popular literature, while still preserving a section for classical Chinese poetry.
- The South (南方) Period: In 1941, the magazine changed its name in accordance with Japanese national policies. During this period, the magazine aligned itself with state ideologies related to classical Chinese national identity and the fervor for Chinese vernacular literature in Taiwan. It also became the battleground for the final New-Old Literature Debate, making it a significant arena for literary concepts.

The reason why this classical Chinese publication was not abolished in 1937 can be attributed to its focus on popular literature and its active cooperation with the policies of the Japanese Governor-General's office. It assisted in producing the content required by the office, in part redirected the reading needs of the classical Chinese-speaking population, and helped control public discourse within the classical Chinese community in Taiwan.
