= Chen Da (singer) =

Taiwanese folk singer

- Born: 1906; Taiwan under Japanese rule
- Died: April 11, 1981 (aged 74–75); Hengchun, Taiwan
- Occupation: folk singer

Chen Da (also Chen Ta; Chinese: 陳達; pinyin: Chén Dá; Wade–Giles: Ch'en^{2} Ta^{2}; Pe̍h-ōe-jī: Tân Ta̍t; b. 1905 (1906?) – d. April 11, 1981) was a Taiwanese folk singer. He was part of Taiwan's folk music scene and worked as an analphabetic creator of lyrics. His spontaneous performances of traditional tunes became an object of study for many scholars focused on the music of Taiwan and brought him to the attention of writers engaged in music criticism including the novelist Wang Tuoh. According to the Journal of Music in China, Chen Da was "the only noted singer of Taiwanese folk singing." Chen Da is also referred to as a singer of "Hoklo folk songs," a synonym of "Taiwanese folk songs."

Chiang Ching-kuo sought to visit Chen Da in his hometown, according to reports in the press. The high esteem that the singer has been accorded is also mirrored by the language used when referring to Chen Da: Music scholar Jen Shangren has praised the singer, claiming that "Chen Da is a rare folksong gem in the history of Taiwanese folk music..." Writing in the Taipei Times, the music critic Ho Yi has called Chen Da "the late folk legend" and "an exceptional yueqin musician famed for his Hengchun folk music sound (恆春調)." Helen Rees referred to Chen Da as the "wandering bard" in the "Introduction" to her book Lives in Chinese Music. Wang Ying-fen has called him "the best-known singer of the Hengchun Peninsula."

During the late 1970s, Chen Da became a voice of socio-cultural resistance against the Kuomintang (KMT) in the eyes of many supporters of the Tangwai movement, as the democracy movement was called. As a folk singer, he "has inspired a host of musicians ... in Taiwan."

== Early life ==
=== Early exposure to Hengchun folk music ===
Chen Da was born on May 12, 1906, in Kōshun District (modern-day Hengchun), a rural district in southern Taiwan, then under Japanese rule. As a child, he witnessed the repression of anti-colonial protests by the Japanese military in his area which resulted in many victims in 1914. This experience influenced him considerably. In 1917, due to poverty-related problems at home, he was sent away and lived with a married elder sister in the Taitung area, near the east coast, for a time. The eleven-year-old boy went to work in sugarcane plantations of the area, together with his sister's husband. It was then that he began to learn to sing Hengchun ballads. He returned to Hengchun in 1922.

=== A young street singer ===
In 1925, Chen Da started to sing Hengchun ballads in public together with his brothers, encouraged by the example of his elder brother who was already a professional folk singer. His intake used to consist of two or three bowls of boiled rice per day, and some small change. During the Great Depression which affected Japan and her colonies severely (and which also triggered the expansionist urges of Japanese capital and the aggressive course that the government embarked on by invading China), Chen Da's survival as a street singer became even more difficult.

Chen Da suffered a brain stroke in 1934. From then on he could not use his hands and feet properly. His mouth remained slanted, and his eyesight was badly impaired. As a handicapped person, it was almost impossible for him to earn a living in any other way than by singing. His life as a street singer condemned him to extreme poverty. Such poverty was, however, characteristic of the lives of the common people, most notably rent-paying peasants in rural districts.

=== The Post-war years ===
In the aftermath of World War II, Taiwan was handed over to Chinese rule. Chen Da continued his life as a street singer performing in the villages of remote districts of the rural south of Taiwan. It is not known how he reacted to the massacres of 1947 that came to be known as the February 28 Incident, or how he was affected by the subsequent years of White Terror.

As a poor and physically handicapped street singer, Chen Da found it impossible to marry. He lived with a widowed woman from 1946 until 1948, however. After their separation, this woman, surnamed Xie, gave birth to his only son.

In 1949, Chen Da lived at the east coast, in Taitung County. Here, he found another widow who was willing to live with him. Two years later, in 1951, the couple moved from Fugang Village (Peinan Hsiang, Taitung Hsien) to Hengchun Township.

In the 1951, Chen Da performed for the first time in a local cultural program. He was joined by another folk singer, Zhang Xi (長惜). As a duo, they improvised Hengchun folk songs.

Music scholars point out that Chen Da often improvised the lyrics. This was a common feature of Chinese folk ballad delivery. Various regional versions circulated and interpreters frequently changed the text, reacting both to given situations and the audience. Chen Da would also invent ballads spontaneously. For this reason, he has been referred to as a poet.

While there existed much space for spontaneous variation or fresh creation with respect to the lyrics in Hengchun folk music (恆春民謠 Hengchūn minyao), Chen Da – like other folk singers – used traditional tunes. The delivery of these tunes by the singer and the accompaniment on the yueqin or moon guitar was also marked by improvisation.

As a singer, Chen Da was a story teller. Improvisation of the stories told by this ballad singer was both a result both of Chen Da's restless life as a wandering bard (thus Helen Rees) and of the fact that he confronted changing audiences and paid attention to the situation that existed while he was facing a specific audience. It reflected his awareness of the events that 'moved' people. But above all, it shows his rootedness in an oral tradition and his illiteracy which made it impossible to refer to and merely reproduce, in a slavishly 'faithful' manner, existing written lyrics.

On the occasion of the traditional Mid-Autumn Festival in 1951, Chen Da was invited for the first time to take part in a ballad singing contest (民謠歌唱比賽). This contest took place at the Fu An Temple (福安宮) in Checheng Village (車城鄉). It was the first folk singing contests held at the Fuan Temple. Since 1951, it has taken place every year.

For Chen Da, participation in the contest was a small breakthrough. Still, not everyone in South Taiwan respected him. Jen Shangren remarks that in the eyes of some local citizens, he was just a "beggar" performing in the streets, hoping to get a few mao (cents) in order to survive. Jen Shang-ren also notes, however, that Chen Da "received considerable acclaim from his audience and deeply touched them" when performing.

=== The early and mid-1960s ===
Since 1960 until his death the folk singer lived alone, as the woman he had lived with since 1949 left him in that year. His domicile remained a simple, straw-thatched "hut at Shawei Road (砂尾路 ) in Hengchun Township" until his death in 1981.

His biography says very little about Chen Da's life as a street singer in the early 1960s. White Terror and KMT rule had initimated large segments of the population since 1947. It chilled the atmosphere on the island and it is hardly possible that this did not have an effect on street performances. Both ways: it made singers and audiences careful and apprehensive, and it must have fanned veiled commentaries by a singer who is known to have commented, in his ballads, on social ills and historical injustice. This sly resistance, worthy of The Good Soldier Švejk, a proverbial figure invented by the satirical writer Jaroslav Hašek, is even more likely in a social-cultural setting far from the cities, with an audience that consisted almost exclusively of non-Mainlanders who suffered from considerable discrimination under KMT-rule.

=== 'Discovered' in 1967 ===
The White Terror enacted in the wake of the massacres of 1947 receded somewhat in the second half of the 1960s. But being suspected could still mean death. Between the end of the Pacific War and the late 1960s, a considerable number of citizens were executed. The US Vice Consul in Taipei at the time of the February 28 Incident gives an estimate of 20,000 merely for the massacres in late February, 1947; others put that figure at 30,000. About 140,000 citizens received long prison sentences when suspected of opposition to the dictatorship of Generalissimo Chiang Kai-shek (蔣介石).

The trial and sentencing of the poet Bo Yang in the spring of 1968 shows that there is no reason to talk of a 'liberalization' of the regime in this period. Apparently in retribution for cartoons drawn by him, Bo Yang, who was also a cartoonist and journalist, was imprisoned from March 7, 1968, to April 1, 1977, under extremely harsh conditions in the labor camp on Green Island, Taiwan – a concentration camp for political prisoners since 1947.

While dissidents were still silenced by severe repression, making it impossible to speak of a softening of the regime's policies, foreign economic historians point out, however, that a 'liberalization' occurred in the economic sphere. One of its consequence was a considerable worsening of the material situation of rural producers, largely due to the decline of the rice price in the late '60s and the '70s. Liberalization in the economic sphere also brought no freedom for workers to strike or organize. Trade unions and strikes remained banned under martial law until 1987.

If the regime itself was not becoming more liberal, politically, and the life of peasants and generally the common people in the rural districts turned from bad too worse while folks in the working class quarters of the large cities suffered from low wages, abysmal pollution, and poor housing conditions, then at least many young middle-class people could escape the repressive situation in Taiwan by studying abroad. Many came back as liberals.

It took two liberal composers trained as ethno-musicologists in the West, Shih Wei-Liang (Shi Weiliang史惟亮) and Hsu Tsang-Houei (Hsu Tsang-houei許常惠), to 'discover' Chen Da in 1967. Liu Ching-chih notes that Hsü Tsang-Houei (a composer and professor who became very involved in folk music research as an ethnomusicologist) had pursued advanced studies in West Germany in the 1960s. Having returned to Taiwan in 1965, he "set up the Chinese Youth Music Library" in 1966 and started to "collect national music." Shih Wei-liang was also a "composer, musicologist and professor."

Thus, the year 1967 became a turning point in Chen Da's life as a folk artist even though he hardly realized this at the time. Chen Da was actually discovered by chance during field work undertaken by Shih and Hsü in South Taiwan. Presenting the more general context that led to Chen Da's discovery, Liu Ching-chih writes that "(i)n 1976, Shih and Hsu Tsang-houei [had] founded the Research Center for Chinese Ethnomusicology, and started a tide of enthusiasm for the collection of folk songs. They systematically collected more than 3,000 songs from the plains and mountains of Taiwan, the largest-scale collection campaign ever carried out in the island. However, lack of funding meant that the work continued for only two years."

The two researchers patterned their field trip according to the paradigm established by the folk music researchers John and Alan Lomax in the 1930s. They had a good sense of quality. When they encountered Chen Da in Hengchun, they were immediately impressed by his style of singing, the tonality, the authenticity of his ballads.

At the time, Chen Da "was already old and half blind, but still able to improvise long ballads telling stories and teaching morals. His simple and straightforward voice and lyrics (we)re deeply moving..." Chen Da was valued highly as a musician, both due to the emotional expressivity of his singing style, and the honesty his audience as well as most music scholars discovered in his delivery.

As Liu Ching-chih writes, "the important question is whether or not a work of music expresses the true thoughts and emotions of the composer" respectively the creative ballad singer, "or, to put it another way," whether or not he "has made full use of his capacity for musical expression (technique) and moral strength (honesty)." Referring to socially and politically committed music, Liu added, "There are some good examples from the Anti-Japanese War" that showed how such music need not necessarily become cheap and superficial music, thus mere propaganda.

=== A folk music craze on Campus leads to Chen Da's first record ===
The advent of the Campus Folk Song Movement (xiaoyuan minge yundong 校園民歌運動) in Taiwan – that was inspired by the American folk music revival – improved the perception and degree of appreciation of folk music in the early 1970s. The folk music revival in the U.S. had peaked in the second half of the 1960s. Partly due to the presence of American GIs, transferred to Taiwan – from the Vietnam battleground – for R&R (rest and recreation), songs by Bob Dylan and others, but also U.S. rock music arrived in Taiwan and were heard not only in U.S. clubs but also in Taiwanese avant-garde venues like the Scarecrow Coffee House and the Columbia Restaurant (both in Taipei) during the early 1970s.

Commercial labels, radio and television slowly took note, as a small educated public discovered its taste for folk songs – especially American and British folk singers like Bob Dylan, Joan Baez or Judy Collins. Later, as the Campus Folk Song Movement gathered speed, it also led to the emergence of socially and politically committed new Taiwanese respectively Chinese folk music in Taiwan. It thereby created a receptive cultural environment (at least on campus) that made possible the discovery of Chen Da not only by musicologists but by campus youths.

The presence of an urban audience that cared for foreign folk music encouraged Prof. Shih (史惟亮) and Hsu (許常惠) to contact a record company, on behalf of Chen Da, although without his knowledge. In 1971, they were able to invite the old folk singer to Taipei. The music critic Yatin Lin later on commented that "Shih Wei-liang (史惟亮) and Hsu Chang-hui (許常惠) ... brought him to the capital city of Taipei to record albums to preserve this 'dying' singing style." In 1971, one album featuring Chen Da was recorded. It was entitled "A Folk Musician: Chen Da and his Ballads."

The song from this album that became most widely known is the long ballad Sixiang qi (Thoughts Arising). As Shen Shiao-Ying noted, "the song 'Ssu Hsiang Ch'i' (Sixiang qi)" is "an old Taiwan ballad made popular by Chen Ta (Chen Da)." Shen Shiao-Ying adds that the ballad is heard at the beginning and in the final sequence of a popular Chinese film entitled Farewell China (1990).

According to the music director of the film, Mr. Shen Sheng-te, "the song expressed an all-encompassing Chineseness." In Shen Shiao-Ying's opinion, it also "expresses lament toward the tragic state of Chinese people who have left their homeland."

The interpretation offered by Shen Shiao-Ying reflects the sadness expressed by the ballad and by Chen Da's particular rendition. Shen Sheng-te's reading of the ballad accentuates Chen Da's attachment to the Chinese motherland and his longing for reunification. The latter sentiment was later on also expressed by another ballad Chen Da sung that remembered, in an allusive way, the massacres in the wake of February 28, 1947. Sadness has been a recurrent characteristic of Chen Da's songs, but so has been their penchant to "remember."

=== Chen Da's "encounter" with a regime "interested" in him ===
The media and certain scholars have claimed that the early 1970s brought a certain relaxation of the repressive policies that the K.M.T. continued to enact until the lifting of martin law in 1987. In 1972, Chiang Ching-kuo (蔣經國), the eldest son of Chiang Kai-shek, became prime minister in Taiwan. Perhaps Chiang Ching-kuo (who had a noteworthy record already, as head of the secret police) read the signs of the time when he began, as prime minister, to make modest overtures directed at those citizens who had been discriminated and intimidated in the past. Political parties that could function as opposition parties remained forbidden and trade unions remained outlawed. But now soap operas using the Taiwanese dialect (spoken by the vast majority of the islanders) appeared on television.

In September 1973, in the context of a policy that aimed to coopt native Taiwanese citizens, a group of about one hundred senior citizens from South Taiwan were invited by a Christian Welfare Association close to the KMT to take part in a bus tour to Taipei. The folk singer Chen Da was among those selected for the tour, perhaps becauset he was by now moderately well known in Northern Taiwan.

The members of the group were guests of a so-called welcome party organized by the mayor of Taipei that was also attended by a high-ranking aide of Premier Chiang Ching-kuo for P.R. reasons. Subsequently, the KMT-controlled press reported that Chen Da "praised and thanked the government" and that he was "profoundly impressed" by Premier Chiang, cherishing the photo of the premier that he had received and keeping it as a precious memory. Under the existing conditions, Chen Da had hardly any choice but to show himself "impressed."

Chen Da's real position towards the KMT became apparent when Premier Chiang came to Hengchun later on, in the context of one of his public relation tours. The premier sought to see the folk singer, apparently hoping to win sympathies among native speakers of Taiwanese. Chen Da avoided him, however, by hiding somewhere. Later on, he claimed diplomatically that he was 'sad' that he had missed the chance to meet Chiang Ching-kuo.

The follow-up to this reveals a lot about both the regime and the singer. Feeling (or fearing) negative consequences, Chen attempted subsequently to see the premier in Taipei. As he approached the presidential palace and tried to enter, he was arrested by the military police, described as 'deluded' and locked away for a brief period in a psychiatric hospital. "In the hospital, he fiddled with his old yueqin" and began to sing – while improvising the lyrics, as he would usually do: "(...) '... how can my destiny be so sad, subject to such treatment...! I am no psychopath.'(...)" For those who reported these words, they were merely proof of delusion or the approaching dementia of an old and ill-educated man. For others, they document the way his creativity as a singer-songwriter worked. He would seize the moment, and was always inspired by what moved him, emotionally and intellectually.

=== The folk singer Chen Da – a symbolic figure since 1976 or 1977 ===
==== Wind of Spring or A period of so-called liberalization in Taiwan ====
On April 5, 1975, the ailing dictator Chiang Kai-shek (蔣介石) died at the age of 87. It became easier for persons with a regional Taiwanese rather than mainland Chinese background to pursue careers within the K.M.T. government. For some, the cooptation policy seemed to work. KMT membership increased. On the other side of the political spectrum, dissidents became more daring. Xiangtu wenxue literature 鄉土文學 (referred to by many scholars abroad as Taiwan Nativist Literature) began to flower. It was sharply attacked by most scholars and journalists close to the KMT from the beginning. The reason was that like the works of writers connected with the May Fourth Movement, it was considered as subversive. The books of May Fourth authors like Zhang Ailing (Eileen Chang張愛玲), Qian Zhongshu(錢鍾書), Xiao Hong(蕭紅), Lao She (老舍), Cao Yu (曹禺), Mao Dun (茅盾) and especially, Lu Xun (魯迅) were banned in Taiwan throughout the martial law period.

During the 1970s, it was mentioned on campus that books by these authors were available only to loyal professors at Chengchi (Political) University in Mucha (Muzha) for research purposes. The books were kept in a "poison cabinet" reserved for "dangerous literature" to which only "dependable" persons with a proven academic interest had access. But otherwise, it was forbidden to possess such books. They could not be published and should not be read by average citizens in Taiwan.

==== The Coca Cola Incident: Li Shuangze and the emergence of the "Sing your own songs movement" ====
The mid-1970s were also a period when the Campus Folk Song Movement (xiaoyuan minge yundong 校園民歌運動) gathered speed. From its start, singer-songwriters like Hu Defu (胡德夫), "Yang Xian, Li Shuangze, Wu Chuchu and Yang Zujun" were involved in this movement. Hu Defu and Li Shuangze (李雙澤) had both been singing American folk songs at the Scarecrow, opposite Taida, in the early 1970s. They met at this place and became friends.

By the mid- and late 1970s, the Campus Folk Song movement became commercially successful, though only as segment of the market controlled by the local "music industry." A typical Campus Folk Song or School campus song (Chinese) in Taiwan was partly akin to American folk rock, partly more soft and sentimental. Campus Folk singer/songwriters would stick exclusively to Lyrics in English, at least in the early years.

Then, something remarkable happened. During a folk concert that took place on the Tamkang campus in 1976, the folk singer, writer and painter Li Shuangze (李雙澤) challenged the exclusive focus on U.S. folk music. It was a political and cultural scandal that became known in the furious KMT-controlled press as the "Tamkang Incident" or "Coca-Cola incident."

Li Shuangze, who was "a charismatic and heroic singer" and a Tangwai movement (dangwai 黨外) "activist," reached many university students. In the exuberant words of a young music critic writing in the Tamkang Times, he "shook the youth of his generation" out of their political passivity and cultural submission to Americanized tastes in music. He did so "by ... smashing a Coca-Cola bottle on the stage," shouting, Why don't you sing your own songs? Sing your own songs! before he started to sing during "a Tamkang Western Music Concert in 1976" – in Chinese! Obviously, he had been "taunting the audience(...)" because up to this point they had kept "favoring western songs."

It was the start of the Sing Your Own Songs Movement. Opposing the westernized Campus Folk Song Movement, "Li Shuangze, Wu Chuchu and Yang Zujun... launched campaigns for 'modern Chinese folk songs,' (or) 'new folk songs' (xin minge)" and sought for roots in Taiwan's socio-cultural reality, including its folk culture. Like Li Shuangze, the singer Yang Zujun (楊祖珺) worked closely together with Liang Jingfeng (Liang Ching-feng 梁景峰) who wrote the lyrics of several songs, among them the lyrics of Meilidao (Formosa), sung by Li Shuangze. The song Meilidao later became the anthem of the Tangwai movement and provided the name for an important opposition journal, Meilidao or Formosa Magazine.

The new folk songs that were written can be considered for the most part as protest songs. "The songs were composed through fusing instrumental and melodic elements from American folk rock, along with the expression and themes from Chinese folk music, both of which were familiar to the youth of the time. Songs from the genre are characterize as having a forward-looking, optimistic, simple, and youthfully naive feel (...)"

In its opposition to Westernization (xihua 西化), the "New Folk Song" (xin minge 新民歌) movement or Sing your own songs movement [that is to say, the Sing your Chinese – i.e. Mandarin and/or Taiwanese and/or Hakka – protest songs movement] was allied with the authors and readers of Taiwan Nativist Literature movement: with xiangtu literature. It also tended toward the Democracy (= Dangwai 黨外 ) Movement that challenged the KMT regime and its conservative backers abroad. But above all, the singer-songwriters and lyricists of this movement discovered Chen Da and soon got in touch with him.

It is well known that the 'folk craze' in the U.S. had not been unconnected with the civil rights movement and, somewhat later, anti-war sentiment and even active opposition to the war in Vietnam. In a similar vein, the new interest that developed since 1976 in new Taiwan protest songs (xin minge 新民歌) and, likewise, in traditional Taiwanese folk music, was re-enforced by the two parallel and simultaneous phenomena just mentioned: nativist (that is to say, socially critical, realist) literature (乡土文学 xiangtu wenxue) and the new Tangwai movement (subsequently referred to as dangwai (黨外) or pro-democracy movement).

Now, Chen Da became a point of reference, and soon a symbolic figure. The affinity of 'nativist literature' and Chen Da's folk songs was recognized by the xiangtu novelist and Dangwai activist Wang Tuoh (Wang Tuo 王拓) in 1977. In his collection of essays entitled Alley Drums, Wang Tuo deals with nativist literature and its definition. He reflects on the reasons why it became a target and object of controversial debate in the media. He also deals with the allegation (voiced in the KTM-controlled media at the time) that it was subversive. He focuses on the history of Chinese literature in Taiwan since the end of the civil war in 1949. And he deals with the folk music of Chen Da as well as the paintings of Hong Tong – folk paintings that are akin in essence to the nativist literature.

Despite the fact that Chen Da had been able to record his first album in 1971, he had to wait five more years, till 1976, before Prof. Shih Weiliang (史惟亮) and Prof. Hsu (許常惠) were finally able to obtain a chance for him to sing on TV. In that same year, Shih (史惟亮) and Hsu (許常惠) also made Chen Da's participation in a folk concert possible. And they saw to it that he could make some money by singing in a Taipei restaurant, in all likelihood the Scarecrow restaurant. The reaction in the press was surprisingly positive. The desolation expressed by his ballad was noted, the poetry of his lyrics was praised, the accompaniment on his yueqin admired.

What the press did not say when Chen Da was praised, was that there was a reason why his ballads were sad. They were sad because Taiwan's history and the experience of the common people was sad. The regime required that the fine advance made under its leadership should be extolled. The desolation expressed by Chen Da's songs was the same desolation, however, that was also expressed by the socially critical novels and short stories of Wang Tuoh (Wang Tuo 王拓;, b. 1944), Chen Ying-chen (Chen Yin-zhen 陳映真, b. 1937), Yang Ch’ing-ch’u (Yang Qingchu 楊清矗;, b.1940), Wu Cho-liu (Wu Zhuoliu 吳濁流 (1900–1976)), or even Hwang Chun-ming (Huang Chunming 黃春明), and by the poems of Bo Yang (柏楊;). Three years later, in late 1979, Wang Tuoh and Yang Ching-chu would be arrested and sentenced to long prison terms for their political commitment to the democracy movement, like many other Dangwai activists. Sad ballads reflected not only the situation of Chen Da but generally of the common people in Taiwan.

Also in 1976, "Prof. Shih Weiliang (史惟亮), who was already sick in bed with lung cancer, was worried about the plight of Chen Da, and contacted the Harvard Business Foundation for Education and Culture in June in order to discuss the possibility of producing an album of this folk musician in the U.S.; the proceeds of the record should then go to Chen Da."

When Shih Wei-liang (史惟亮) died in early 1977, Chen Da sang his famous ballad "Sixiang qi" during the memorial union in Taipei.

In early 1977, people who wanted to help Chen Da and who knew that he had a hard time trying to earn a living, helped him to get an offer to perform in Taipei. Thus, Chen Da performed (again?) at the "Scarecrow restaurant" in Taipei in January, and once more in April, 1977. He was now already past 70.

==== Li Shuangze and others invite Chen Da to sing on campus in Tamsui ====
In March, 1977 when Chen Da was back in Hengchun, he sent a letter to Professor Hsu (許常惠) saying that his life was very difficult. It had remained so despite a few public performances in North Taiwan and despite the recognition accorded to him by ethno-musicologists like Hsu and by young urban lovers of folk music. As a consequence, a letter, written by Prof. E. Lin (林二教授 ), appeared in the "United Daily News" that appealed to the public to face the plight of folk artists. Then, on March 31, 1977, Chen Da participated in the "Night of Chinese folk songs" (Zhongguo minsu geyao zhi ye / 中國民俗歌謠之夜) that took place at Tamkang University. It was the first time Chen Da performed in front of a mass audience. The event had been organized by pro-democracy (dangwai 黨外 ) activists. The choice of Tamkang was hardly accidental. The campus in Tamsui was perhaps less efficiently controlled due to the fact that Tamkang was a private institution.

Among those very active in organizing this event, Li Shuangze (李雙澤) as well as three of his friends, the lecturers Liang Jingfeng (Liang Ching-feng 梁景峰 ), Lee Yuan-chen (Li Yuanzhen 李元貞, a feminist activist) and Wang Ching-ping (Wang Jinping 王津平) must be mentioned. They all played a role in the 'Tangwai movement. Before and after the concert, proscribed music cassettes with Taiwanese folk songs had been distributed on campus. As Nimrod Baranovich later noted, "[t]he simple technology and low cost in cassette recording made the production and dissemination of alternative, unofficial culture easier than ever before."

Of all the songs the crowd heard in that night, a song by Chen Da is well remembered that referred allusively to the "February 28 Incident" (er'erba shijian 二二八事件 : the massacres on 2/28/1947 by the KMT army and police). It was a love song, ostentatively of the sort sung by fisherfolk, and the singer had managed to artfully weave two, two and eight into the text: obviously a strong accusation of the KMT dictatorship which had outlawed and would punish any talk about the events of February 1947. The longing that the fisher and his distant beloved felt for each other was immediately understood as a poetic expression of the deep longing for reunification with the motherland. Several years later this longing waned in many dangwai activists. Some, like the writer Wang Tuoh, became disillusioned with the 'motherland' after visiting the PR China. Democracy mattered as much as social justice, after all. But this was after the lifting of martial law in Taiwan. By that time, Chen Da and the night of Chinese (rather than Taiwanese) folk song in Tamkang was a memory already.

==== Chen Da's second album and his collaboration with Lin Hwai-min ====
On February 10, 1978, Prof. Hsu (許常惠) was in charge of the first recording session done for a collection of albums by various Chinese folk musicians that he was putting together as "editor-in-chief." The first album was to feature Chen Da's rendition of Hengchun folk ballads.

In November 1978, the writer, choreographer and dancer Lin Hwai-min, founder and 'director' of the internationally acclaimed Cloud Gate Dance Theater, invited Chen Da to record a ballad that was then integrated into a dance performance entitled "Legacy." Professor Yan Lüfen (顏綠芬) recalls the recording session and a bit of conversation between Lin and Chen Da: "In 1978, Lin Huai-min decided to create (sc. the dance theater performance) Legacy. He went to the recording room (sc.with Chen Da). The old man put down the yueqin (i.e. his moon guitar) and asked what he should sing today. Lin said, Sing "Tangshan guo Taiwan de gushi" (唐山過台灣的故事). Chen Da, with his desolate hoarse voice, improvised the song "Sixiang qi zuxian xian xinguo Taiwan" (思想起祖先鹹心過台灣)..." Chen Da's reaction to Lin's suggestion says a lot about the old man. Incidentally, Prof. Yan was not the only one who noted the beauty of Chen Da's "hoarse voice," a quality he had in common with Bob Dylan (for instance).

On Dec.16, "Legacy" had its premiere in Chiayi, Central Taiwan. "Legacy" was performed both in Taiwan and Japan. As Yatin Lin noted, "Chen Da's epic songs about Taiwanese immigrants laid the blueprint for Lin's Legacy, with Chen's hoarse voice inserted as interludes between dance sections [of Lin Hwai-min's Cloud Gate Dance Theater]. Through such narrative and musical associations, the transition from identifying with an 'imaginary' home in mainland China [...] to a new 'home' [...] was being proposed" by the choreographer, in the opinion of Yatin Lin. In other words, Yatin Lin interprets Legacy and Chen Da's delivery of Sixiang qi as an endorsement of a Taiwan identity that includes the latest wave of immigrants from the mainland. This is an interpretation, however, that is influenced by the direction in which the thought of many Dangwai activists developed in the 1980s and 1990s.

Thanks to Professor Hsu (許常惠), who acted as producer/editor, Chen Da recorded a second album in 1979. The album, entitled Chen Da, Hengchun ballads ("Chen Da yu Hengchun diao shuochang" 《陳達與恆春調說唱》), was released in August 1979. According to a critic, the album included a noteworthy "piece of Hengchun social realism," a ballad entitled "The Gangkou Incident / Ah Yuan and Ah Fa –Tragic story of a father and a son." 《港口事件─阿遠與阿發父子的悲慘故事》(Gangkou shijian / A Yuan yu A Fa fuzi de beican gushi").

This ballad was just another proof of Chen Da's commitment to social justice. In the words of the critic, who noted ""Chen Da's verdant and luxuriant singing," the ballad opened "another 'page' in a history of blood and tears (...)" of the island. It is not for nothing; however, that this critic describes the style of singing as 'verdant,' that is to say, fresh and characterized by surprising improvisation (very much like Taiwan's 'green' vegetation) as well as 'luxuriant' – thus 'rich' and characterized by surprising musical inventiveness. It goes to show that "social realism" need not be drab.

More recordings appeared posthumously, notably Songs of A Mountain Town (山城小唱 Shancheng xiao chang), published in 2000 by Wind Records in Taipei 台北.

Chen Da's occasional performances in Taipei restaurants (and his appearance on television) had not lifted him above the position of a representative of a music genre that lacked the prestige of classical music. Folk music was a minor art, in the eyes of the cultural bureaucracy and of many members of the upper class and the middle class. Performing in these small Taipei venues had been a step on the way to being better known in Northern Taiwan, however. It had targeted a small public that had a specific kind of music (including blues, foreign and Chinese folk music) at heart. Quite a few were artists, writers, in short, intellectuals who saw Chen Da as one of their own, as a "Nativist" – somebody rooted in the native culture of the common people, just like the realist literature that focused on Taiwan and its social problems. All of this let him pose no hazard to the regime, from the point of view of the bureaucracy, as long as there had been no mass audience.

The concert of March 1977, in Tamkang, had been a different matter: Here, Chen Da had been playing in front of a crowd. The event showed that he could move people. It turned him, more than ever, into the symbolic figure that Wang Tuoh saw in him. He was a man who sang in Taiwanese. He was a man who had sung a ballad that was banned when the censors began to understand the allusive way in which the massacres that started on February 28, 1947, were remembered.

==== Chen Da's Performances on Campus in the wake of the December 1979 crack-down ====
That Chen Da could move and inspire people, became especially significant in 1980, a year that was to usher in a period of enormous tension. In that year, not without reason, he was again invited to perform in front of a crowd at the Tamkang 淡江 campus. When he came, the performance had an implicit symbolic significance: that of resistance.

It was a resistance that was necessitated by the crackdown that began with the Kaohsiung Incident in December 1979. In late 1979 and early 1980, more than one hundred Dangwai leaders and many ordinary Dangwai activists had been arrested in the wake of their participation in the banned International Human Rights Day demonstration in the South Taiwanese port city of Kaohsiung (the so-called Kaohsiung Incident). The leading dissidents had received long prison sentences. Among them were the novelists Chen Yinzheng and Wang Tuoh, and women's rights activist Annette Lu.

The political climate would remain tense throughout the first half of the 1980s while the sentiment of resistance was increasing in the population. The regime reacted in its own way. In 1983, for instance, Lu Hsiu-yi (盧修一) – a teacher at the Chinese Cultural College who had studied in France – was arrested and sentenced to prison for "presumption of rebellion." Presumption of rebellion was indeed a weird charge, a bit like suspicion of being a subversive – a typical charge between 1947 and 1970. Lu Hsiu-yi was only released in 1986 when the regime, under internal pressure in the streets, was finally beginning to release political prisoners.

Like others, Chen Da braved the climate of the crack-down in 1980. He would not only sing in Tamkang – the campus where he had first performed in front of democracy movement supporters and activists, three years ago. Now, he was also invited to a number of other universities. Again, he performed in front of enthusiastic crowds. It is likely that they were lovers of the native folk music heritage. But, for the most part, they were Tangwai movement supporters and dangwai sympathizers who saw the concerts as an act of defiance. In the course of 1980, Chen Da performed at the Chinese Cultural College (Wenhua文化, today known as Chinese Culture University), at National Chengchi University in Mucha (a Taipei suburb), and then at the Kaohsiung Junior College as well as the Pingtung College of Agriculture, both in South Taiwan.

There were also other tertiary institutions that made Chen Da's participation in folk concerts possible in 1980. None of these concerts amounted to a distraction from issues that moved people at the time. They constituted no innocent entertainment; they were acts of cultural resistance organized by students and academics. Those who participated, singers, audience and organizers of the event, were aware of it. The army officers stationed on campus were aware of it. They had always watched what students were doing and they had received daily reports about 'suspicious' words spoken by teachers in the context of their courses and lectures. All of them knew that the events reflected widespread popular resentment of the crack-down in the wake of the so-called Kaohsiung incident (also known as the Meilidao incident). If the dangwai leaders were jailed, at least the normal people could demonstrate obvious dissent, in the face of a government bent on silencing dissent.

=== The Final Year ===
Chen Da is known to have derived a sense of satisfaction from singing and playing the yueqin (or moon guitar) in front of other people. He knew that he had something to say and wanted to say it. But he also would play his instrument and sing all by himself. Even though he was an old man – an illiterate person from a poor peasant family in the South Taiwanese countryside, and yet a poet, as several scholars have emphasized –, he must have understood the situation that Taiwan faced when a policy that had brought limited though reluctant "tolerance" of opposition was reversed in Dec. 1979. In 1980, Chen Da had traveled a lot and taken part in quite a few campus-based folk concerts. There had been an echo. But the performances had also produced a lot of stress and fatigue. Returning to Hengchun from these tours, he seems to have felt at a loss what to do.

A biographer speculates that perhaps his energy was waning in his last few months. Some observers have suggested a certain aimlessness. They claim that, in the last year of his life, he was often seen wandering in the streets. It is unclear whether he had ceased to perform in the final days of his life. Some journalists close to KMT-newspapers have even claimed after his death that he was increasingly deluded in the last few years of his life. This is unlikely, in view of his many important concerts in 1980. If it is not a purposeful denunciation, perhaps they misread symptoms of loneliness and fatigue.

On April 11, 1981, carrying his yueqin with him as usual, Chen Da was trying to cross a road in his hometown, Hengchun. All of a sudden, progress – or should one say, modernization? – hit him, in the form of a speeding tourist bus. The old folk singer died on the way to the hospital, at age 76.

== Literature ==
- Nimrod Baranovitch, China's New Voices: Popular Music, Ethnicity, Gender, and Politics, 1978–1997. Berkeley (University of California) 2003. – ISBN 0-520-23449-9.
- Broughton, Simon and Mark Ellingham with James McConnachie and Orla Duane (eds.), World Music, Vol. 2: Latin and North America, Caribbean, India, Asia and Pacific. An A-Z of the Music, Musicians and Discs, New Edition. London (Rough Guides Ltd.) 2000. ISBN 1-85828-636-0.
- Chen, Wenwei (陳文緯) / Jishan Tu屠繼善 / Hao Fang方豪. Hengchun xianzhi: Taiwan sheng 恒春縣志 : 臺灣省 (Hengchun County: Taiwan Province), ed. by W. Chen (main editor) and J. Tu (general compiler). Taipei /Taibei Shi (Cheng wen chu ban she成文出版社,) 1983. 2 vols.
- Chen, Yunn-Chu. Development of Taiwanese Folk Songs for Elementary Schools: A Curriculum for Undergraduate Music Education Programs, Diss., Teachers College, Columbia University, 2000.
- Chien, Shang-Jen (also Shangren Jen; Jian Shangren簡上仁): see under Jian, Shangren.
- Ho, Yi (Staff reporter). "A living folk legend remains true to his grassroots spirit," in: The Taipei Times, Aug. 27, 2006, p. 18
- Hsu, Li-sha (= Xu Lisha徐麗紗) and Liangzhe Lin (Lin Liangzhe). See under Xu, Li-sha.
- Hsu, Tsang-houei (Xu Changhui 許常惠). Minzu yinyue lunshu gao民族音樂論述稿 (Folk music discussed (draft)), vol. 1-3. Taipei (Melody Press Yueyun chuban she樂韻出版社) 1987–1992.
- Hsu, Tsang-houei Hsu (Xu Changhui 許常惠). Zhuixun minzu yinyue de gen 追尋民族音樂的根 (The search for the roots of folk music). Taipei (Melody Press Yue yun chuban she樂韻出版社) 1987.
- Hsu, Tsang-houei (Xu Changhu許常惠). Colorful ethnic music of Taiwan. Transl. by Lin Shiu-keh. Taipei, Taiwan (Council for Cultural Planning and Development, Executive Yuan / Xingzheng yuan wenhua jianshe weiyuanhuì 行政院文化建設委員會) 1989. 93 pp., ill.
- Jian, Shangren (also: Shang-Jen Chien; Jen Shangren 簡上仁). Voices of eternal spring : A study of the Heng-chhun tiau song family and other folk songs of the Heng-chhun area, Taiwan. Pingtung 屏東 (Pingtung County Government) 2010. (Orig.: Thesis (Ph.D.) - University of Sheffield, Department of Music, 2009)381 p. : ill.; 30 cm. + 2 sound discs (digital; 4 3/4 in.) - Accompanying compact discs contain recordings of folk song excerpts.
- Jian, Shangren (簡上仁). "Chen Da de ge, zai yinyue he wenxue shang de yiyi he jiazhi /陳達的歌，在音樂和文學上的意義和價值 (Chen Da's ballads: the meaning and value of music and the lyrics)", in: Taiwan yinyue lunshu 台灣音樂論述 / Taiwan Music Discussion : . Printed version: Shang-Jen Chien, 陳達的歌，在音樂和文學上的意義和價值, published Nov. 2009. - - Sh. Jen translated the title as "Chen Da's Songs as well as The Meanings and Values of His Songs on Music and Literature."
- Jian, Shangren (簡上仁). "Chen Da de ge, zai yinyue he wenxue shang de yiyi he jiazhi 陳達的歌，在音樂和文學上的意義和價值(Chen Da's Songs as well as The Meanings and Values of His Songs on Music and Literature)", in: Wenshi Taiwan Xuebao文史臺灣學報 (Journal of Taiwan Literature and History), Vol. 1, No. 11 (Nov.2009), pp. 57–83.
- Jian, Shangren (簡上仁). Lü Dao minjian geyao 綠島民間歌謠 (Green Island Folk Songs). Taitung (Tai dong xian zheng fu 臺東縣政府) minguo 98 = 2009. – The concentration camp of the KMT regime was located on Green Island. Here, poets like Bo Yang, spent many years of their lives.
- Jian, Shangren (簡上仁). Taiwanese Folk Tunes ( Taiwan Minge), Taipei (Chung-wen Co., Inc.) 2004
- Jian, Shangren (簡上仁). Fu-er-mo-sha zhimei : Taiwan de chuantong yinyue福爾摩沙之美 : 臺灣的傳統音樂 (Formosa's Beauty: Taiwan's traditional music). Taipei (Xingzheng yuan wenhua jianshe weiyuanhui 行政院文化建設委員會 Council for Cultural Affairs) minguo 90 = 2001.
- Jian, Shangren (簡上仁). Taiwan fulao yu : yu yan sheng diao yu ge qu qu diao de guan xi ji chuang zuo zhi yan jiu 臺灣福佬語 : 語言聲調與歌曲曲調的關係及創作之研究 (The Taiwanese Holo (=fulao) Language: Research on the Creative Relationship between the tones (of the language) and the melody of a song). Taipei (Zhongwen tushu 眾文圖書) minguo 90 = 2001.
- Jian, Shangren (簡上仁). Taiwan fulao xi minyao : lao zuxian de Taiwan ge 臺灣福佬系民謠 : 老祖先的臺灣歌 (Taiwan's fulao folksongs: old ancestors of Taiwan's songs). Taipei District, Xizhi town (Hanguang wenhua) minguo 87 = 1998
- Jian, Shangren (簡上仁). Taiwan Fulao xi minge de yuanyuan ji fazhan 臺灣福佬系民歌的淵源及發展 (Origin and Development of Taiwanese fulao folk songs). Taipei (Zili wanbao she wenhua chuban bu 自立晚報社文化出版部) minguo 80 =1991
- Jian, Shangren (簡上仁). Shuo chang Taiwan min yao 說唱臺灣民謠(On Taiwanese folk songs). Taipei (Jian Shangren 簡上仁) 1987. – Historical overview and critical assessment of Taiwanese folk songs.
- Jian, Shangren (簡上仁). Taiwan min yao 臺灣民謠 (Taiwanese folk songs). Taipei (Faxing suo Zhong wen tushu) minguo 76 =1987.
- Jian, Shangren (簡上仁). Taiwan ming yao臺灣名謠 (Taiwanese Ballads). Taichung (Taiwan sheng zheng fu xin wen chu 臺灣省政府新聞處) minguo 72 =1983.
- Lee, Coral Lee (ed.). "Critical Reading / Taiwan's Indomitable Homegrown Literature," in: Taiwan Panorama, August 2003, p. 86. (About Nativist Taiwan Literature)
- Li, Chia-Chi (ed.). Music in Taiwan. Trsl. by Carol Huang. Taipei, Taiwan (National Chang Kai-Shek Cultural Center; Performing Arts Review) 2010. 133 p. : col. ill.; 38 cm. ISBN 978-986-02-2177-0. ISBN 986-02-2177-4
- Lin, Er (林二) and Jian Shangren (簡上仁). Tai wan min su ge yao 臺灣民俗歌謠 (Taiwanese folk songs). Taipei (Zhong wen tu shu 眾文圖書) minguo 68 = 1979.
- Lin, Er (林二) and Jian Shangren (簡上仁). 台灣民俗歌謠 /Taiwan min su ge yao. Taipei (Zhong wen tu shu gong si 衆文圖書公司) Minguo 67 = 1978. – Political ballads and songs en vogue in the 1970s.
- Lin, Er (林二) and Jen Shangren (簡上仁). 台灣民俗歌謠 /Taiwan min su ge yao. Taipei (Zhong wen tu shu gong si 衆文圖書公司) Minguo 68 = 1979. – Political ballads and songs en vogue in the 1970s.
- Lin, Ya-tin. "Choreographing a flexible Taiwan: Cloud Gate Dance Theatre and Taiwan's Changing Identity," in: The Routledge Dance Studies Reader, ed. by Alexandra Carter and Janet O'Shea. Abington (Routledge) 2nd ed. 2010; pp. 250–260. - ISBN 0-415-48598-3
- Liu, Ching-chih, A Critical History of New Music in China. Hong Kong (University of Hong Kong Press) 2010. – ISBN 978-962-996-360-6.
- Liu, Zhi-Chun (劉智濬). "Cong qimeng guandian kan liu ling niandai minge caiji yun.從啟蒙觀點看六○年代民歌採集運。(Seeing the folk song collections of the '1960s from an enlightened point of view)," in: Zhong Tai xuebao / Renwen shehui juan 中台學報：人文社會卷; Zhong-Tai (also: Chungtai) Journal / Humanities and Social Studies volume (published by Zhong-tai keji daxue 中台科技大學 Central Taiwan University of Science and Technology), vol.14 (2004), pp. 279–295
- Loh, I-To. "Taiwan," in: The New Grove Dictionary of Music and Musicians, 2nd ed., ed. [by] Stanley Sadie, London (Macmillan) 2001.
- Mittler, Barbara. Dangerous Tunes: The Politics of Chinese Music in Hong Kong, Taiwan, and the People's Republic of China. Wiesbaden (Harrassowitz) 1997. ISBN 3-447-03920-5
- Pan, Yuan-chuan. Die tradierten Fulao-Volksgesaenge der Region Hengchun in Taiwan. Aachen, Germany (Shaker Publ.) 2007. (The traditional fulao folk songs of the Hengchun region in Taiwan, - in German. Ph.D. thesis, Graz University for Music and Performing Arts, Austria / Universitaet füer Musik und darstellende Kunst 2005) - ISBN 978-3-8322-5845-0, ISBN 3-8322-5845-0
- Rees, Helen (ed). Lives in Chinese Music. Urbana, IL (University of Illinois Press) 2009. 223 pp. - ISBN 978-0-252-03379-7
- Rees, Helen. Echoes of history: Naxi music in modern China. New York (Oxford University Press) 2000.
- Ruan, Wenshu (阮文淑). Chong shu yize chuanqi-lun Chen Da yu 'sixiang qi' zai qi ling niandai Taibei de qiguan hua licheng 重述一則傳奇－論陳達與「思想起」在七零年代台北的奇觀化歷程 (Retelling A Legend：On the Spectacle Forming Process of Chen-Da and "Su Siang Ki" in 70's Taipei). Taipei 2012. M.A.Thesis (Institute of Musicology; National Taiwan University).
- Shen, Shiao-Ying. "Obtuse Music and the Nebulous Male: The Haunting Presence of Taiwan in Hong Kong Films of the 1990s," in: Laikwan Pang and Day Wong (eds.), Masculinities And Hong Kong Cinema. Hong Kong (Hong Kong Univ. Press) 2005, pp. 119–136. - ISBN 962-209-737-5
- Shih, Weiliang (史惟亮 ), (ed.). Minzu yue shou: Chen Da he tade ge 民族樂手：陳達和他的歌 。Ethnic musician (Folk Musician) Chen Da and his songs. Taipei (Hope Publisher 希望 Xīwàng ) 1971
- Tsai, Pei-Shan (Cài Pèishān蔡佩珊). "Cong minyao kan Taiwan nüxing de jianren --- yi "qing hezi sao" wei li 從民謠看台灣女性的堅韌－以《青蚵仔嫂》為例 (Recognizing the tenacity of Taiwan's women in folk music --- "Qing hezi sao / Green oyster Sister" as an example)," in:
- Wang, Tuo (王拓 ). Jie xiang gu sheng 街巷鼓聲 (Alley Drums). Taipei (Yuan hang chuban she 遠行出版社 )1977. - A collection of essays, also about Chen Da.
- Wang, Shou-Nan. "Chiang Kai-shek and the Promotion of the Chinese Cultural Renaissance Movement," in: Chinese Studies in History, vol. 21, no.2 (Winter 1987–1988), pp. 66–90
- Wang, Ying-fen. "Taiwan: From Innocence to Funny Rap," in: Simon Broughton, Mark Ellingham with James McConnachie and Orla Duane (eds.), World Music, Vol. 2: Latin and North America, Caribbean, India, Asia and Pacific. An A-Z of the Music, Musicians and Discs, New Edition. London (Rough Guides Ltd.) 2000, pp. 235–240.
- Wible, David (ed.). Beyond Yixing: the ceramic art of Ah Leon. Taipei (Purple Sands Publishers) 1998. - ISBN 957-97321-8-3 (Contributors: Claudia Brown, Ching-liang Chen, Garth Clark)
- Xu, Li-sha (=L.Hsu 徐麗紗 ) and L. Lin (Lin Liangzhe 林良哲). Hengchun bandao juexiang: you chang shiren Chen Da shenming zhi lü 恆春半島絕響：遊唱詩人──陳達生命之旅 (The lost art of Hengchun peninsula – the wandering bard Chen Da). Taipei (Chen Mingzhang yinyue gongzuo youxian gongsi 陳明章音樂工作有限公司 Chen Ming-chang Music Ltd.) and I-lan, Taiwan (National Center for Traditional Arts 國立傳統藝術中心 - Guoli chuantong yishu zhongxin) 2006. 219pp.- ISBN 986-82600-0-0, ISBN 978-986-82600-0-9 (available at: East Asian Library; Princeton University, Princeton, NJ 08544 United States) – The English title was also translated as: The Hengchun Peninsula Vanishes: The Troubadour Chen Da. Journey of A Life.
- Xu, Li-sha (徐麗紗), preface by L. Lin (Lin Liangzhe林良哲). Cong ri zhi shiqi changpian kan Taiwan gezixi 從日治時期唱片看臺灣歌仔戲/ Album from the Japanese colonial period featuring Taiwanese opera. I-lan, Taiwan (Guoli zhuan tong yishu zhongxin 國立傳統藝術中心 ) 2007
- Yang, Hui-Ting. Selected Taiwanese Songs of Hsiao Tyzen.

Florida State University, Ph.D. thesis, 2006.

- Zhao, J. (Zhao Jingyu 趙靜瑜; Reporter)."Huangshan pi ye de minjian tanchang chuanqi Chen Da 荒山僻野的民間彈唱傳奇陳達" (Chen Da: Singing & Playing Legend of the Wild, Secluded Huang Shan ('Barren Mountain')), in: Liberty Times (Taipei), Oct. 9, 2005.

== Sound recordings ==
=== Chen Da ===
- Chen Da 陳達, "A Folk Musician: Chen Da and his Ballads" 民族樂手《陳達和他的歌》Minzu yue shou 'Chen Da he ta de ge' (also translated as "Folk musician - Chen Ta and his songs"), ed. by Prof. Shih (Shi Weiliang). Recorded 1971. - Released June 1, 1977, according to one source. (See: ).
- Chen Da 陳達, "Chen Da -Hengchun ballads《陳達與恆春調說唱》Chen Da yu Hengchun diao shuochang / Heng-ch'un tiao shuo ch'ang." Sanchong City, Taiwan (Firstophone / Di yi chang pian chang you xian gongsi) 1979. -This is part 1 of: "A special album of Chinese folk music" 中國民俗音樂專輯 Zhongguo minsu yinyue zhuanji, edited by Prof.Hsu(Tsang-heuei Hsu / Changhui Xu 許常惠 ). Sanchong Shi, Taiwan (Firstophone Di yi chang pian chang you xian gongsi) 1979–1982. 15 sound discs : 33 1/3 rpm, stereo, 12 in. / Music LPs : Folk music.
- Chen Da 陳達， "Thoughts Arising: Chen Da Sings. 思想起：陳達自彈自唱 Sixiang qi: Chen Da zi dan zi chang." Taipei: (Taiwan Commercial Press台灣商務印書館 Taiwan shangwu yin shuguan ) 1998. Music compact disc.
- Chen Da 陳達, . "Si xiang qi: music from the Cloud Gate Dance Theatre's ballet Legacy." 思想起 雲門舞集《薪傳》舞劇音樂. Sixiang qi yunmen wu ji "xin chuan (Xin zhuan)" wuju yinyue. Taipei / Taibei Shi (Taiwan shangwu yin shuguan 臺灣商務印書館 Taiwan Commercial Press) 1999. (1 sound disc (10 min.): Compact disc. Issued with "Tai-wan hou lai hao so tsai".) Ch’en Ta, vocal and yueqin (moon guitar) accompaniment.
- Chen Da 陳達, "Songs of a Mountain Town" 山城小唱 Shancheng xiao chang (Fulao Folk Songs in Taiwan Island). Taipei 台北 (Wind Records / Wind Music International Corporation / 風潮唱片 Fengchao changpian / Fengchao yinyue guoji gufen youxian gongsi) 2000. Music compact disc. 1 sound disc : digital; 4 3/4 in. + 1 pamphlet (35 pp., illustr., 13 x 14 cm.) Producer: 吳榮順 Wu Rongshun --(陳達，2000，山城小唱/陳達珍貴錄音夢幻再現。台北：風潮唱片，音樂) - Recorded in 1961–1967 in Hengchun and Pingtung.
- Chen Da 陳達，"Chen Da 陳達, Hengchun ballads 陳達與恆春調說唱 Chen Da yu Hengchun diao shuochang / Heng-ch'un tiao shuo ch'ang." Ed. by Prof. Hsu ( Xu Changhuì 許常惠). Taipei 台北 ( First Audio 第一影音 Di yi yingyin) 2000. Compact disc。
- Chen Da 陳達 ，"Chinese [music] 198. : Tape no. II.2, Chern Dar and his songs complete set." Hong Kong (Chinese University of Hong Kong University Library System, Publisher) 2008. 1 sound disc (ca. 36 min.) : digital; 4 3/4 in. - Reproduced copy from Pian Collection open reel (7 in.). Recordings from other unknown commercial recordings.

=== Chen Da with others ===
- "A special album of Chinese folk music" 中國民俗音樂專輯 Zhongguo minsu yinyue zhuanji, edited by Prof. Hsu (Tsang-heuei Hsu / Changhui Xu 許常惠 ). Sanchong Shi, Taiwan (Firstophone Di yi chang pian chang you xian gongsi) 1979–1982. 15 sound discs : 33 1/3 rpm, stereo, 12 in. / Music LPs : Folk music. (Part 1. Ch'en Ta yü Heng-ch'un tiao shuo ch'ang = Ch'en Ta and Heng-ch'un tune minstrelsy; Part 2. Ch'en Kuan-hua yü Fu-lao hsi yin yüeh = Ch'en Kuan-hua and Fo-lao folk music; Part 3. T'ai-wan shan pao ti yin yüeh: A-mei tsu min ko = music of Taiwan aborigines: The folk songs of the Ami; Part 4. T'ai-wan shan pao ti yin yüeh: Pi-nan tsu yü Ya-mei tsu min ko = The music of Taiwan aborigines: Folk songs of the Puyuma and the Yami; Part 5. Su-chou t'an-tz'u = Suchow minstrelsy; Part 6-7. Chang T'ien-yü ti min su ch'ü i (1–2) = The Chinese folk minstrelsy of Chang T'ien-yü (1–2); Part 8. T'ai-wan ti Nan kuan yin yüeh = The music of Nan-kuan: a southern school; Part 9. T'ai-wan shan pao ti yin yüeh: A-mei, Pi-nan = The music of Taiwan aborigines: The Ami, The Puyuma; Part 10. T'ai-wan shan pao ti yin yüeh: Pu-nung, Shao, Lu-k'ai, Ta'i-ya = The music of Taiwan aborigines: The Bunun, the Thao, the Rukai, the Atayal; Part 11. T'ai-wan shan pao ti yin yüeh: Ts'ao, P'ai-wan, Sai-hsia, Ya-mei, P'ing-p'u = The music of Taiwan aborigines: The Tsou, the Paiwan, the Saisiyat, the Yami, the plain aborigines; Part 12. Miao-li Ch'en Ch'ing-sung pan ti K'o-chia Pa-yin = The Hakka Pa-yin music of Miao-li Ch'en ensemble; Part 13. Chang-hua Li-ch'un-yüan ti Pei-kuan yin yüeh = The Pei-kuan music of Chang-hua Li-ch'un-yuan; Part 14. Ch'en Pi-hsia ti K'o-chia min yao = The Hakka folk songs by Lai Pi-hsia; Part 15. Hsiang-kang Tung-shan Ch'ao chü t'uan ti Ch'ao-chou hsi = The Ch'au-chou stage music of Hong Koong Tung-shan Ch'au-chou stage troupe.)
- "A special album of Chinese folk music" 中國民俗音樂專輯 Zhongguo minsu yinyue zhuanji / Zhonghua min su yi shu ji jin hui; Min su yinyue yan jiu zhong xin., edited by Prof. Hsu (Tsang-heuei Hsu / Changhui Xu 許常惠 ). Taipei / Taibei Xian Sanchong Shi (Firstophone / Di yi chang pian chang you xian gongsi) 198-? . Musical cassettes : Cassette recordings : Folk music : Chinese: 20 sound cassettes : analog, stereo. – (1. Chen Da and Hengchun Tune Minstrelsy—2. Chen Guanhua and Fu-lao Folk music—3-4. The Music of Taiwan aborigines—5. Suchoin Tanci (Suchow Minstrelsy) -- 6–7. The Chinese folk minstrelsy of Chang Tianyu—8. The music of Nan'guan (A Southern school) -- 9–11. The Music of Taiwan aborigines—12. The Kakka Bayin (8 instruments) music of Miaoli Zhen Ensemble—13. The Beiguan music of Changhua Lichunyuan—14. The Hakka folks songs by Lai Bishia—15-16. The Chaozhou stage music of Hong Kong Dongshan Chaozhou stage troupe—17. Drum & dance theater. Early stage of Kua Theater—18. Middle stage of Taiwan Kua Theater, "The maid kept his umbrella"—19. Tayal songs & saisets' songs—20. Hakka's theater of "tea-picking.")
- (Chen Da 陳達 et al.), "Chinese folk music," Vol. 1-3. 中國民間音樂. Zhongguo minjian yinyue, edited by Prof. Hsu (Tsang-heuei Hsu / Changhui Xu 許常惠 ). With Guan-Hua Chen (Chén Guānhuá 陳冠華.); Chen Ta (Chen Da 陳達,); P'i-hsia Lai (Lai Bishia賴碧霞,); Zh.Yang (Yang Jinchi 楊錦池.); Cheng Song-fu (程松甫): Ma Yuan-liang (馬元亮); Gu Zhen-sheng (顧振聲.); Fong-song Liu (Liu Fengsong劉鳳松); Fong-t'ai Liu (Liu Fengdai. 劉鳳岱.); Ch'ing-song Chen (Chen Qingsong 陳慶松 ); Ch'ang-hu Hsu (Xu Changhu 許常惠). Taipei (Shuping shumu chuban she chuban 書評書目出版社出版) Book Reviews & Bibliographies Publisher) 19--? (3 sound discs : analog, 33 1/3 rpm, stereo; 12 in.) - Program notes in containers in Chinese and English.
- (Chen Da 陳達 et al.), "Hometown Songs · Songs about rivers and lakes" 故鄉的歌・走唱江湖Guxiang de ge, zou chang jianghu. Taipei / Taibei Shi (Rolling Stones Audio Publishing Limited / Gunshi yousheng chuban she youxian gongsi 滾石有聲出版社有限公司 ) 1992. - Singers: Chen Da, 1st work: Si xiang qi (11:38); Chen Guanhua, 2nd work; Chen Xueli and Lin Qiuxue, 3rd work; and Cai Zhennan, 4th-8th works.
- Chen Da陳達 et al., (Mixed recordings of traditional Chinese folk songs, workman's songs and Buddhist chants). Hong Kong (Chinese University of Hong Kong University Library System, Publisher) 2008. 1 sound disc (ca. 10 min.) : digital; 4 3/4 in. - Recordings from other unknown radio broadcasts/commercial recordings. Reproduced copy from Rulan Chao Pian Open Reel Collection (5 in.) - Live recording. - Contains: "Pole carriers -- Work bound --Work songs -- Solo boatman's song --Mixed work songs --Buddhist chants" (by Chen Dar and Ju Dagang).
- Chen Da陳達 et al., Singing Instrumental processional [music]; Buddhist chants; Wedding processional (music). Hong Kong (Chinese University of Hong Kong University Library System, publisher) 2008. 1 sound disc (ca. 10 min.) : digital; 4 3/4 in. - Recordings from other unknown radio broadcasts/commercial recordings. Reproduced copy from Pian Collection open reel (5 in.) - Contains: Buddhist chants—Wedding music—Song sung in unknown Chinese dialect by Chen Da—Ju [ju] da gang.
- Chen Da陳達 et al. "Vocal styles." Hong Kong (Chinese University of Hong Kong University Library System, publisher) 2008. 1 sound disc (ca. 11 min.) : digital; 4 3/4 in. - Recordings from other unknown radio broadcasts/commercial recordings and live performances. Reproduced copy from Pian Collection open reel (5 in.). Contains: 1. Chen Da's ritual song (sung in unknown Chinese dialect) -- 2. A Buddhist chant—3. A ballad opera selection.
- Ab(h) Bing 阿炳, and Chern Dar (Chen Da陳達), "Chinese 198. Tape IV.4, Ab(h) Bing and Chern Dar" (Chen Da陳達), Hong Kong (Chinese University of Hong Kong University Library System, publ.) 2008. 1 sound disc (ca. 6 min.) : digital; 4 3/4 in. - Reproduced copy from Pian Collection open reel (5 in.). -Recordings from other unknown radio broadcasts/commercial recordings. Recordings of musical performance (san xian and yue qin) performed by Ah Bing (Abing); with unknown Chinese song sung by Chern Dar (Chen Da).
- "Chen Da Sings Buddhist Chants; (with) Du Shiniang." 陳達 佛曲; 杜十娘. Chen Da Fo qu; Du Shiniang. Hong Kong (Chinese University of Hong Kong University Library System, Publisher) 2008. - 1 sound disc (ca. 12 min.) : digital; 4 3/4 in. - Reproduced copy from Pian Collection open reel (5 in.). Recordings of live performance. (Zhao Rulan, i.e. Rulan Chao Pian personal recording collection)
- Xi He 西河 (da gu大鼓 = drums); Chen Da陳達 (ge qu 歌曲= sings)] etc., "Xi He [dàgǔ] Chen Da [gequ]. Kuai Shu. Yueju. 西河[大鼓] 陳達[歌曲]. 快書. 越劇.." Hong Kong (Chinese University of Hong Kong University Library System, publisher) 2008. 1 sound disc (ca. 10 min.) : digital; 4 3/4 in. - Recordings from other unknown radio broadcasts/ OR commercial recordings. Reproduced copy from Rulan Chao Pian Open Reel Collection (5 in.)

=== Hengchun folk songs, other Taiwanese folk songs ===
- Shang-Jen Chien (Jian Shangren), "Voices of eternal spring : A study of the Heng-chhun tiau song family and other folk songs of the Heng-chhun area, Taiwan." Pingtung (Pingtung County Government) 2010. (Orig.: Thesis (Ph.D.) - University of Sheffield, Dept. of Music, 2009). Book, with CDs. 381 pp. : ill.; 30 cm. + 2 sound discs (digital; 4 3/4 in.) - Accompanying compact discs (!!!) contain recordings of folk song excerpts.
- "Hengchun folk ballads" 恆春民謡 Hengchun minyao. By X.Zhang (Zhang Xinchuan 張薪傳., B. Zhang (Zhang Bilan. 張碧蘭.), D. Zhu (Zhu Dingshun 朱丁順)., W. Zhang (Zhang Wenjie 張文傑), Y. Chen (Chen Ying 陳英.), Xiuquan Xu (Xu Xiuquan 許秀全.). Pingtung (Pingtung County Government屛東縣政府 Pingdong xian zhengfu) 199-?. Music CD, 1 sound disc (74 min.): Digital, stereo; 4 3/3 in., lyrics in Chinese (1 folded sheet) inserted in container. --Sung in Southern Min dialects. Performer(s): Zhang Xinchuan (1st-2nd works), Zhang Bilan (3rd work), Zhu Dingshun (4th-5th works), Zhang Wenjie (6th, 9th works), Kending guo xiao min yao ban (7th-8th works), Chen Ying (10th work), Zhang Wenjie, Xu Xiuquan, Chen Ying (11th work). Contents: 1. Sixiang zhi (6'00") - 2. Si ji chun (3'45") - 3. Niu mu ban (7'14") - 4. Si gui chun (4'36") - 5. Niu mu ban (5'50") - 6. Sixiang zhi (5'16") - 7. Si xiang zhi (3'19") - 8. Pingpu diao (3'12") - 9. Wu kong xiao diao (14'46") - 10. Si gui xiang (8'57 ") - 11. Niu mu ban (12'59").
- "June Jasmine: Taiwan Folksongs." By Yousheng Lin (conductor); Shanghai ai yue yue tuan Shanghai Philharmonic Orchestra. Hong Kong (Naxos Digital Services Ltd.) 2004. Audio CD. (Contents: June jasmine - Flower in the rainy night - Peach blossom village - Hengchun folksong - Song of mount - Penny song - Jilted song - If the gong sounds - Spring dream by the riverside - Bleakness in the heart - Peach blossom crossing the river - Four red seasons.)
- Takaaki Masu (ed.), "Folk music from Japan, the Ryukyus, Formosa, and Korea." Collectors' series; Columbia world library of folk and primitive music, vol. 11.(Sung and played by native musicians.) - Collected and edited by Genjirō Masu (pseud.).] - Notes and texts on Japan prepared by Otome Daniels, RP Dore, and CJ Dunn; on Ryukyus, by FJ Daniels; and on Korea, by Zong in Sob. Table of contents keyed to map on album cover. Romanized texts with English translations included in notes bound in album. Contents: Sado o-kesa—Esashi oiwake—Otemoyan—Tai-ryō-bushi—Tsugaru yama-uta—Yagi-bushi—Matsuri hayashi—Kuroda-bushi—Kiyari bushi—Dodoitsu—Kappore—Mogami-gawa-funa-uta—Chakkiri-bushi—Mo-ashibi—Ashibi komocha—U-gusuku-guena—Kariushi—Hya-odori—Basinuturi-bushi—Ts'ai-ch'a-ku—Welcoming the bride—Smasalom—Marasitomal—Pisila-railas—Sabrisal—Wan kan tzai—Miruyan araran—Sushim-ka—Taki taryon—Kyon fun-taryon—Sonju-pri—Chun-taryon.

== See also ==
- Chen Yingzhen
- Music of Taiwan
- Yang Hsiuching
- Shih Wei-liang (史惟亮)
- Taiwanese Hokkien
- Wang Tuoh
- Yang Ch'ing-ch'u (楊青矗
