= Chung T'ieh-min =

Taiwanese writer (1941–2011)

- 鍾鐵民
- Born: January 15, 1941; Taiwan
- Died: August 22, 2011 (aged 70)
- Occupation: Writer

Chung T'ieh-min (Chinese: 鍾鐵民: Hakka transliteration: Chûng Thiet-mìn or zungˊ tiedˋ minˇ; January 15, 1941 – August 22, 2011) was a Taiwanese writer of Hakka descent. Most of his works were novels and essays, and some were children's literature and dramatic scripts. His writing style was simple and honest, quiet and realistic, focusing on rural Hakka themes, earning him the title of a "farmer writer". The eldest son of the renowned Hakka writer Chung Li-ho (鍾理和), Chung T'ieh-min had been writing articles for newspapers and magazines, publishing books such as Small Flowers in Stone Cracks (石罅中的小花), Yu Chung-hsiung's Spring (余忠雄的春天), and Yorkshire's Dusk ( 約克夏的黃昏). He received several literary awards, including the 15th Wu Chuo-liu Literary Prize and the Loa Ho Literature Award.

== Activities ==
In the 1980s, Chung T'ieh-min founded the Chung Li-ho Memorial Hall in Meinong, Taiwan's first privately funded literary memorial, and the Chung Li-ho Literary Foundation, with the aim of collecting and preserving information on modern and contemporary Taiwanese writers. In the 1990s, he devoted himself to rural movements and social activism, which included compiling local educational materials, organizing literary camps for nativist literature, participating in the Meinong anti-reservoir movement, and founding the first rural community college: Chi-Mei Community University.

His involvement in rural movements and social activism in the 1990s included compiling educational materials on Hakka culture, language, and literature, organizing nativist literature camps and Li-shan literature camps (笠山文學營), and building a statue of Chung Li-ho and a Taiwanese literature trail. Chung T'ieh-min also served as a director of the board of the National Culture and Arts Foundation (國家文化基金會). Throughout his life, in addition to writing, Chung was actively involved in public affairs, promoting the development of arts and culture and rooting literature in the community.
