= New-Old Literature Debate during Japanese Rule in Taiwan =

The New-Old Literature Debate during Japanese rule in Taiwan refers to a series of literary debates between modern intellectuals and classical literati following the Chinese literary traditions of the Qing Dynasty. This debate was initiated by Chang Wo-chun (張我軍), who criticized old Taiwanese literature for hindering the progress of literary reform in Taiwan, leading to subsequent debates on Taiwanese nativist literature.

Writer Chang Wo-chun published articles titled A Letter to the Youth of Taiwan (致臺灣青年的一封信) and The Terrible Taiwanese Literary World (糟糕的臺灣文學界) in The Taiwan Minpao. The two essays attacked the old Taiwanese literature and poets, which not only received agreement among many, but also sparked off the New-Old Literature debate. He adopted the literary reform ideas of China's May Fourth Movement, criticized Taiwanese classical literature, and advocated vernacular literature. To promote vernacular literature, he not only discussed "what language to write in," but also implied a belief in "writing for the public.”

Writers such as Loa Ho (賴和) also supported Chang Wo-chun's stance, claiming that classical Chinese was an obstacle to literary reform and pointing to the decline and conservatism of Taiwan's old literati. On the other hand, the representatives of the old literature emphasized the importance of classical literature as the foundation of Taiwanese literature. The debate continued until March 1926, when it was finally settled.

During the Japanese rule, most Taiwanese were not familiar with the Mandarin spoken in northern China. Authors such as Loa Ho (賴和) faced the language barrier of translation when writing in Mandarin. During Japanese rule, Taiwanese and Japanese were the most widely used languages. Therefore, intellectuals in Taiwan tried to change the existing writing environment, and the New-Old Literature Debates during the Japanese Rule emerged. The cultural reform movement was also part of a broader social movement, which led to the initiation of the Taiwanese nativist and local literature movements, culminating in a peak of Taiwanese literary movements.
