= Loa Ho =

Taiwanese poet, novelist, social activist

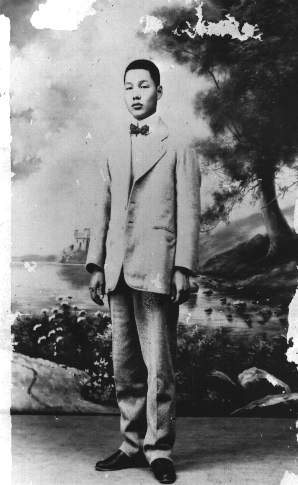
Loa Ho

Loa Ho (Chinese: 賴和; pinyin: Lài Hé; Pe̍h-ōe-jī: Loā Hô) (28 May 1894 – 31 January 1943), real name Loa Ho (賴河) and Lai Kuie-ho, pen name Lan Yun, Fu San, An Tu-shêng, Hui, Tsou Chieh-hsien, Kung I-Chi, Lang, etc., was a Taiwanese poet who was born in Changhua County, Taiwan Prefecture, Fujian-Taiwan Province, Qing dynasty (modern-day Changhua, Taiwan). He was a medical doctor but was also a writer, poet, surgeon, and social activist from Changhua, Taiwan, having had enormous fame in literature. He founded the literature and arts column of The Taiwan Minpao and served as its editor-in-chief.

Loa Ho nurtured many renowned Taiwanese writers, making a profound impact on the development of Taiwanese literature, and was therefore titled the "Father of Modern Taiwanese Literature" and the "Father of New Taiwanese Literature". He was one of the leading figures in the Taiwanese literary scene of the 1930s.

== Early life ==
The majority of Loa Ho's works address difficulties that arose in Taiwanese society under Japanese colonial control, such as the destruction of traditional Han customs as a result of Japanese colonization and modernization, Japanese authorities' oppression and exploitation of Taiwanese people, and the resilient efforts of Taiwan's underprivileged population to make a living in difficult daily circumstances. As a result, they are thought to have a strong sense of humanitarianism.

Loa's work can broadly be divided into three phases. During his early career, he wrote primarily classical Chinese poetry. On a sojourn as a doctor in a Japanese hospital in Amoy (now called Xiamen), a treaty port in China, he became acquainted with the work of Chinese May Fourth writers such as Lu Hsun. Although his stay in China seems to have been depressing, he returned to Taiwan with the intention to contribute to Taiwan's cultural scene. He opened a reading room in his clinic where he provided Chinese vernacular fiction and Japanese periodicals. This reading room allowed him to mentor several essential writers of the late Japanese colonial period. Most of his writing during this second period was nativist in his choice of themes and satirical in form. Through several short stories written during the 1920s and early 1930s, Loa satirized the brutality of colonial policemen, the indifference of the populace, and the impotence of native intellectuals. During the third period, Loa became more nativist in orientation and actively experimented with writing in Taiwanese Hokkien. Although these experiments were not entirely successful, they expressed an emerging Taiwanese national consciousness upon which later Taiwanese writers would build.

Loa Ho effectively employed a realistic narrative approach across various literary genres, encompassing novels, essays, new poetry, and classical poetry. His major works include novels such as A Lever Scale (一桿稱仔), A Disappointing New Year (不如意的過年), The Story of a Class Action (善訟的人的故事), Three Unofficial Accounts from the Romance of the Slippery Eels (浪漫外紀), and new poems like “流離曲” (Ballad of Wandering), “Sacrifice with Awareness: To Comrades in Erlin” (覺悟下的犧牲：寄二林的同志), and “Elegy of the Southern Land” (南國哀歌). Among them, "Elegy of the Southern Land", which is based on the Wushe Incident (1930), is one of the longest poems in the Taiwanese New Literature Movement during the Japanese era.

Taiwanese, Chinese, and Japanese-style Chinese are all frequently employed in his work, reflecting the linguistic diversity of Taiwan at the time. His writings, according to certain literary critics, inspired the formation of future writing genres in Taiwan, such as Taiwanese nativist literature.

== Political activity and legacy ==
In addition to his writing, Loa participated in the Taiwanese Cultural Association and other activist groups. His political activity led to his arrest and a subsequent illness contracted in jail, which caused his early demise. Japanese wartime strictures on writing in languages other than the national language forced him to stop his literary output slightly before his death. He was an influence on his younger contemporaries Yang Kui and Wu Chuo-liu. His rediscovery during the late 1970s and early 1980s also contributed to Taiwan's new nativist literature.

== Literature works ==
=== Fiction ===
- Loa, Ho (1996). "The Advocate". Oxcart: Nativist Stories from Taiwan 1934-1977. Translated by Rosemary Haddon. Dortmund: Projekt-Verl. pp. 59–72. ISBN 9783928861571.
- Loa, Ho (2004). 獄中日記 [A Diary in Jail]. Taiwan Literature: English Translation Series (15). Translated by Lloyd Sciban and Shu-Ning Sciban. University of California, Santa Barbara: 155–64. OCLC 607653193.
- Loa, Ho (2004). 不如意的過年 [A Dissatisfying New Year]. Taiwan Literature, English Translation Series (15). Translated by John Balcom. University of California, Santa Barbara: 41–48. OCLC 607653193.
- Loa, Ho (2006). 鬥鬧熱 [Festival High Jinks]. Taiwan Literature: English Translation Series (19). Translated by Sylvia Li-chun Lin. University of California, Santa Barbara: 19–26. OCLC 607653193.
- Loa, Ho (2004). 歸家 [The Homecoming]. Taiwan Literature: English Translation Series (15). Translated by Yingtsih Hwang. University of California, Santa Barbara: 49–54. OCLC 607653193.
- Loa, Ho (2004). 惹事 [Making Trouble]. Taiwan Literature: English Translation Series (15). Translated by John Balcom. University of California, Santa Barbara: 25–40. OCLC 607653193.
- Loa, Ho (2004). 前進 [Progress]. Taiwan Literature: English Translation Series (15). Tr. by Lloyd and Shu-Ning Sciban. University of California, Santa Barbara: 149–54. OCLC 607653193.
- Loa, Ho (2004). 赴了春宴回來 [Returning from a Spring Banquet]. Taiwan Literature: English Translation Series (15). Translated by Yingtsih Hwang. University of California, Santa Barbara: 55–58. OCLC 607653193.
- Loa, Ho (2004). 一桿稱仔 [The Steelyard]. Taiwan Literature: English Translation Series (15). Translated by Howard Goldblatt. University of California, Santa Barbara: 15–24. OCLC 607653193. Also Loa, Ho (1983). "The Steelyard". In Lau, Joseph S. M. (ed.). The Unbroken Chain: An Anthology of Fiction from Taiwan fiction since 1926. Translated by Jane Parish Yang. Bloomington: Indiana Univ. Pr. pp. 3–11. ISBN 9780253361622.

=== Poetry ===
- Poems in: Taiwan Literature, English Translation Series 15 (2004): 165–75
