= Huang Shihui =

Taiwanese writer

Huang Shihui (Chinese: 黃石輝; Pe̍h-ōe-jī: N̂g Se̍k-hui; 1900–1945), born in Chiaochhengkha (Chinese: 鳥松腳; Pe̍h-ōe-jī: Chiáu-chhêng-kha), Tainan Ken, Japanese Taiwan (modern-day Niaosong District, Kaohsiung, Taiwan), was a Taiwanese writer and a supporter of leftist movements. The debate on Taiwanese Hokkien literature which he initiated during the Japanese rule of Taiwan enlightened the development of Taiwanese rural literature.
