= Chen Yingzhen =

Taiwanese author (1937–2016)

- 陳映真
- Born: Chen Yongshan (陳永善); 8 November 1937; Shinchiku Prefecture, Japanese Taiwan
- Died: 22 November 2016 (aged 79); Beijing, China
- Education: Cheng Kung Senior High School; Tamkang University
- Occupation: author
- Spouse: 陳麗娜 (m. 1977)
- Writing career
- Language: Chinese, English, Japanese
- Period: 1959–2016
- Genres: prose, novel
- Subjects: left-wing politics, humanitarianism, Marxism, modernism
- Movement: Taiwan Nativist Literature

Chen Yingzhen (Chinese: 陳映真; 8 November 1937 – 22 November 2016) was a Taiwanese author. Chen is also notable for having served a prison sentence for "subversive activity" between 1968 and 1973. He was active as writer from the late 1950s until his death in 2016.

The Collected Works of Chen Yingzhen is 15 volumes long, and was published in 1988. Some of his stories were also included in Lucien Miller's Exiles at Home.

== Early life ==
Chen Yingzhen was born Chen Yongshan in northern Taiwan, the son of a devout Christian minister. Despite this, he never was a Christian himself while growing up. He was raised in what became Zhunan, Miaoli, with a twin brother, who died in 1946.

Chen's early years were shaped by the tumult of the Chinese Civil War, the Nationalist government's retreat to Taiwan, and its perpetration of the White Terror. The socio-political turmoil of post-war Taiwan motivated him to address the social realities around him through literature.

== Career ==
His early writings reflected the struggles and idealism of his generation while embodying the tension brought about by traditional values and modern influences. Chen's depictions of the bleak political atmosphere of the White Terror on Taiwan contain strong existentialist themes.

His interest in writing was motivated by the cultural movements of the 1960s. As a young adult, Chen participated in Taiwan's intellectual movements amongst the youth, including in student protests and leftist intellectual discourse during much of the 1960s, during which he established himself as a leftist writer versed in modernist aesthetics. In 1968, the secret police arrested him for organizing Marxist reading groups. Chen was released during the amnesty that followed Chiang Kai-shek's death in 1975.

In his mid-years, Chen Yingzhen harnessed family life without abandoning the development of his literature. Works like "My Father" by Chen show the complexity of family relationships and the expectations that come with them. Chen talked much about familial obligations which, upon further scrutiny, reveal a struggle with emotional conflict in fulfilling one's desires within the constraints of cultural expectations. In his essay "Life and Death", Chen extends these themes to discuss some of the universal questions of existence and legacy.

=== Xia Chao ===
Xia Chao (夏朝), the literary magazine edited by Chen Yingzhen, became a dominant cultural phenomenon in Taiwan in the 1980s and 1990s. One of Chen's purposes in working with Xia Chao was to establish opportunities for writers to provoke discourses on issues of ethnicity, justice, and cultural background. According to Chen, the primary focus should be put on literature as a way of understanding existential questions. Using Chen's philosophy, Xia Chao published many works that provoked and responded to the challenges or questions of society. With a focus on non-superficial feelings and intentions, Xia Chao formed a community of like-minded readers and writers.

=== Renjian ===
The Renjian (人间) magazine was co-established by Chen Yingzhen in the 1980s as an attempt to discuss societal problems like human rights, democracy, and social justice. Chen's editorial content helped redirect the magazine towards real-life issues and experiences of locals and urged writers to publish materials that were relevant to Taiwanese society. Renjian was established to advocate for the 'voiceless'. Chen insisted that literature should depict actual life in order to attract attention to the harsh fate of those who do not have any opportunities to be heard in an oppressive society. Depictions of social inequality, political oppression, and the struggles for personal liberties helped spread the essence of dissent and progressive thoughts found in the magazine's content. Besides understanding human suffering, Renjian taught readers the importance of the public's societal roles and responsibilities, and supported co-operatives of writers with the common purpose of championing change through writing.

=== Research advancements ===
In Third World, Chen writes in favor of the reductionism of such labeling by noting the various heterogeneities in cultural identity. As he positions himself within broader geopolitical texts, Chen does so with the expressed intention of encouraging readers to interrogate their ingrained discourses of development and cultural identity themselves. His approach to narration has served as a model for the genre of fiction and non-fiction, particularly in Taiwanese literature. Through his narrative methods and socio-political comments, Chen shaped contemporary discussions of literature and society.

== Philosophy ==
Chen was a supporter of the notion of a unifying Chinese national identity in Taiwan, as opposed to "nativist" writers like Zhang Liangze, who support the development of a native Taiwanese consciousness. Chen contributed to several journals as an editor and writer, and was "regarded as Taiwan's utmost representative leftist intellectual." Jeffrey C. Kinkley noted in 1990 that Chen was "considered by many Chinese readers and critics in Taiwan, Hong Kong, and overseas to be Taiwan's greatest author."

== Later life and death ==
In his later years, Chen Yingzhen remained contemporary with the issues of his surroundings and resorted to changes in narrative style to make subtle social and political commentary. These environmental themes continued to salience in his work. Later in life, Chen took up philosophical investigations into life and death, which becomes apparent in essays like "Life and Death". Chen was arrested in 1968 by the Kuomintang for "leading procommunist activities", and was imprisoned until 1973. Chen was again imprisoned in 1979, shortly before the Kaohsiung Incident. In 1988, he set up the China Council for the Promotion of Peaceful National Reunification in Beijing to promote Chinese unification and oppose Taiwan independence. He died in Beijing on 22 November 2016 at the age of 79 following a long illness.

== Legacy ==
From the influential literary work of Chen Yingzhen, Taiwanese society has been immensely affected, especially in matters concerning identity and cultural expression. By articulating the struggles of people burdened by the weight of expectations from society, Chen makes readers think more critically about identity and relationships and develops an avenue toward discussing social cohesion and inclusivity in society. Chen's stories often serve as a contribution to Taiwan's policy debates on social cohesion and inclusiveness and identify issues of alienation and marginalization, especially those of young adults and less privileged backgrounds. He discusses the human psychological trait of ignoring the suffering of others, particularly in utilitarianism, in which one person's suffering is accepted for the benefit of the rest.

Some critics have seen Chen's work as featuring important moral dimensions while lacking technical proficiency. For example, Joseph S. M. Lau said of Chen, "his output is relatively small and his style is at times embarrassing, yet he is a very important writer... Almost alone among his contemporaries, he addresses himself to some of the most sensitive problems of his time."

=== Political impact ===
In his writings, Chen places personal narratives within a greater political history as a way to show how history configures contemporary experiences. He presents resistance and struggle against oppression through his characters as ways to pursue active civic commitment and demonstrate the effectiveness of activism in representing the political voice of the people. Taiwan–China relations have always been an important point of focus in Chen Yingzhen's perspective and work. Chen stated that he wanted Taiwan to join back with China because he allegedly believed that its culture and history are intertwined. Chen expressed this sentiment in his writings, including in "Third World".

=== Influence on literature ===
Chen's literature explored the connection between identity, society, and the complexity of postwar Taiwan. Chen's earlier fiction covers personal experiences of hardships, while his later works discuss political ideologies. Chen influenced the climate of the 1960s and 1970s toward the growing concept of Taiwanese nationalism by engaging with the nation's history and culture. Chen's works established and promoted a literary trend that emphasized realism, humanism, and the representation of marginalized groups. Besides Chen's direct literary works, Chen significantly influenced Taiwanese literary culture with his theory of social intervention, which indirectly motivated generations of writers. On the grounds of literary experiments and the political outlook, Chen Yingzhen made a significant contribution to the transformation of Chinese modern literature as a palate for the voices of marginalized groups. In the post-war era, Chen used societal struggles to depict individual goals that highlighted the political disillusionment of the times.

Chen Yingzhen's influence on Taiwanese literature extends deep into his exchange and interaction with other writers and scholars; many acknowledge that his work has stirred critical thinking among literary figures and created a community through writings dedicated to the identity and culture of Taiwan. For instance, the Chen-dedicated forum in the journal Frontiers of Literary Studies presents a collaborative effort by scholars in their engagement with his literary contributions. According to Zheng Huan, Chen's impact is felt in younger generations of writers who try to express concerns about identity and social justice in their own writing.

== Works ==
=== My Kid Brother Kangxiong ===
Chen's My Kid Brother Kangxiong (1959) reflects on Taiwan's socioeconomic exploitation and what Chen viewed as its spiritual degradation. The character Kangxiong fantasizes about egalitarian utopias while his sister conforms to bourgeois norms and marries into a wealthy Christian family. Kangxiong kills himself out of shame following his affair with his landlady. His sister, who has left behind her rebellious consciousness for the benefits of materialistic living, ruminates on Kangxiong's political ideals but is not moved to any action beyond the bourgeois norm of rebuilding Kangxiong's gravesite to "make it luxurious."

=== The Village Teacher ===
The Village Teacher (1960) describes the tragedy of a petty bourgeois intellectual whose efforts to bring progressive politics to a rural town are hampered by his own vacillation and pessimism.

=== My Father ===
In My Father, Chen Yingzhen reflects on his complicated relationship with his father and discusses themes such as loyalty, expectation, and the generational divide. Chen's case demonstrates that these family dynamics are determined by more general social influences and reveals how painfully stressful the psychological tension is in upholding traditional values within modern society. Chen uses this work as a way of commenting on the pressures placed upon individuals by family expectations and questions what loyalty implies in today's world.

=== Life and Death ===
In the work Life and Death, Chen raises basic existential questions about mortality and the human condition. The work reflects personal experiences with loss and urges readers to confront their perceptions about life and death. Chen comes across as vulnerable in his introspective writing style. It is a personal and social commentary on how life and death are considered by society; individual experiences hence become shaped and focus on necessary compassion and understanding in such universal themes.

=== Literary Reportage: When Red Stars Fall into Qigulin Mountains ===
In Literary Reportage: When Red Stars Fall into Qigulin Mountains, Chen adopts the journalistic way of discussing historical changes that took place in individual lives. It is representative of literary craftsmanship and the factual narrative by Chen in conveying the emotional weight of the historical trauma of Taiwan. By narrowing his essays to personal stories, he humanizes often-abstract discussions on political upheaval and social change and makes them more relatable to readers.

=== What the 'Third World' Means to Me ===
In What the 'Third World' Means to Me, Chen challenges the reductionist approaches to understanding the term "Third World." He presents his interpretation and signals a "multivocal" self amid such a construction of identity. By addressing the interrelatedness of personal and political identities, Chen urges his readers to reassess their assumptions regarding development and cultural representation. As such, the work is not a critical polemic on postcolonial discourse but rather a display of diverse experiences that comprise collective identities in a globalized world.

=== Loyalty and Filiality Park ===
Loyalty and Filiality Park is a work through which Chen emphasizes the importance of the cultural significance that these values have held within Taiwanese society. He believes these mainstream notions of loyalty and filial piety come into conflict with individual desires and modern aspirations. Therefore, he explores such values in a way to critique societal expectations that, in themselves, may lead to personal turmoil and conflict. This work calls upon readers to reflect on their relationships with family and society and questions the relevance of traditional values in present contexts.

=== The Noodle Booth ===
In The Noodle Booth, Chen Yingzhen proposes a mix of personal and political dynamics of the society and culture of Taiwan. The main characters represent the society of Taiwan and their lives portrayed in the social background of historical transformations. From customers that the main character interacts with, Chen introduces aspects of loneliness, longing, and perseverance. The titular noodle booth itself stands as a place for connections where characters meet. Chen gave the characters human emotions because he wanted to emphasize the values of the relationship that was built around the noodle stall in the middle of the storm.

=== The Generals' Clan ===
In The Generals' Clan, the author tries to pose a variety of questions concerning military force as well as the origin of individuals and the nation. It proposes a voice for an audience concerned with that context and opens a way to reflect on privileges, responsibilities, or even the ethical choices of those involved in the structures of military families. The authorities and common people in the 'military saga' of The Generals' Clan are caught in the war between family and state, fantasies and realities, love, and conscience. The tensions presented by Chen depict the estimated mental strain of an individual formed by lineage as well as the pressure possessed by social obligations. In this respect, this issue of identity and belonging is in tune with what may be observed in the rest of the text, which is reinforced by the theme of the private individual and social history. In addition, it faces the problem of military dictatorship in Taiwan.
