= Wang Tuoh =

Taiwanese writer, public intellectual, literary critic and politician

- 王拓
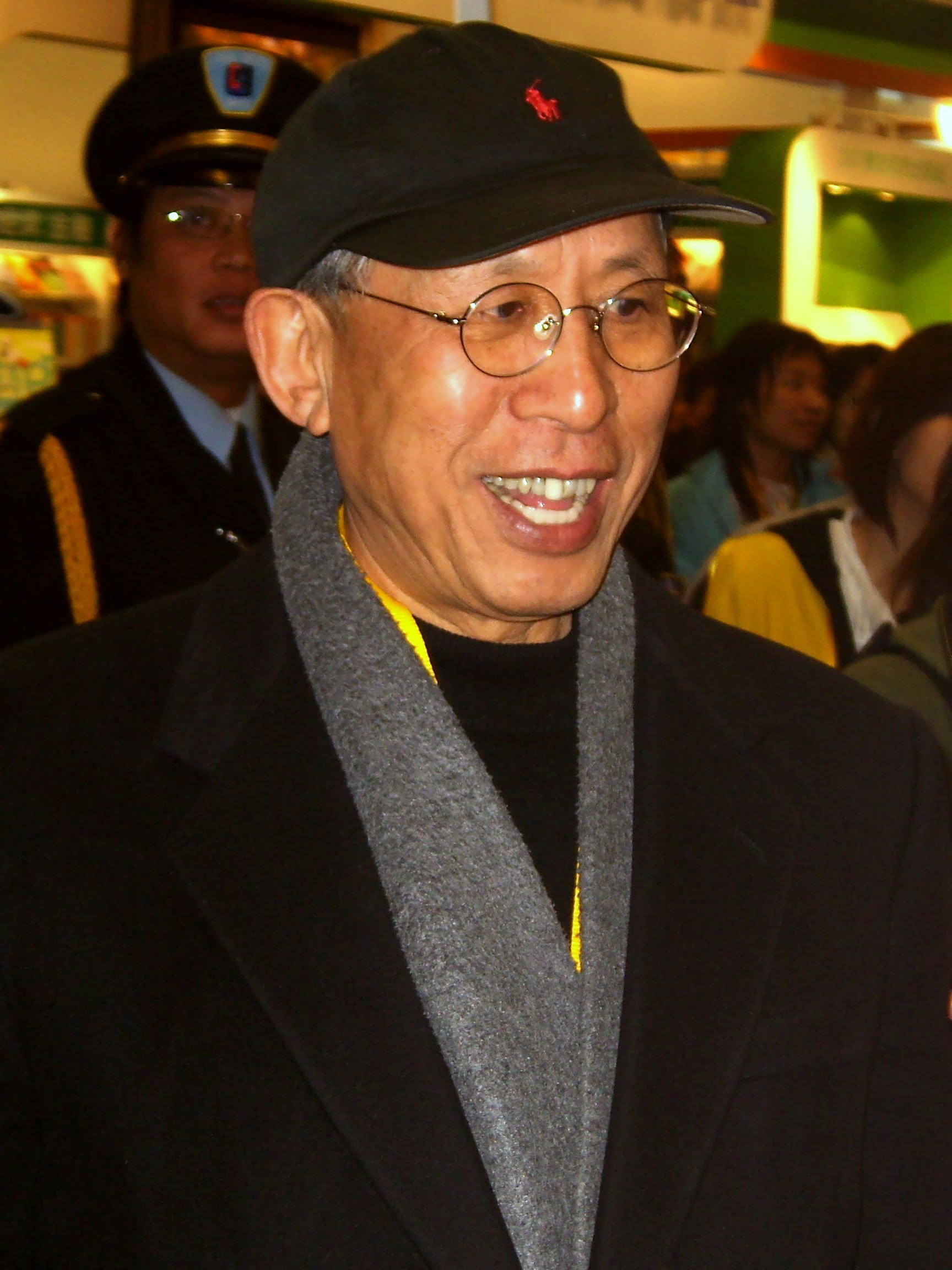

Secretary-General of the Democratic Progressive Party
- In office 20 May 2008 – 20 May 2009
- Chairperson: Tsai Ing-wen
- Preceded by: Lee Ying-yuan
- Succeeded by: Wu Nai-ren

Minister of the Council for Cultural Affairs
- In office 1 February 2008 – 19 May 2008
- Deputy: Wu Chin-fa
- Preceded by: Wong Chin-chu
- Succeeded by: Huang Pi-twan

Member of the Legislative Yuan
- In office 1 February 1999 – 31 January 2008
- Succeeded by: George Hsieh
- Constituency: Keelung
- In office 1 February 1996 – 31 January 1999
- Constituency: Republic of China

Personal details
- Born: 9 January 1944 Keelung, Taihoku Prefecture, Empire of Japan
- Died: 9 August 2016 (aged 72) Taipei, Taiwan
- Party: Democratic Progressive Party
- Education: National Taiwan Normal University (BA); National Chengchi University (MA); University of Iowa (PhD)

Wang Tuoh (Chinese: 王拓; pinyin: Wáng Tuò; Pe̍h-ōe-jī: Ông Thok; 9 January 1944 – 9 August 2016) was a Taiwanese writer, public intellectual, literary critic, and politician. He was born in Badouzi, then a small fishing village near the northern port city of Keelung. His name was originally Wang Hung-chiu (王紘久).

== Education ==
Wang graduated from National Taiwan Normal University with a bachelor's degree in Chinese literature and earned a master's degree in the subject from National Chengchi University. He then studied literature in the United States at the University of Iowa.

== Writing career ==
Wang Tuoh published his first short story, The Hanging Tree in 1970, and went on to write a series of stories set in his home village of Badouzi that drew heavily on his own experiences in a small, insular village where everyone is part of a larger family that has been there for five generations. The most well-known of these stories is the novella Auntie Jinshui (金水嬸; published September 1976) which describes the story of the eponymous Auntie Jinshui. Auntie Jinshui is a street peddler who has successfully raised and educated six sons, but falls upon especially hard times after being swindled by a priest introduced to her by one of her sons. She then falls behind on her payments to her Hui (會), an informal village credit network, and finds herself gradually ostracized from her friends and family. This novella was also later made into a movie.

His novels are The Story of Cowbelly Harbor (牛肚港的故事; published 1982) and Taipei, Taipei! (台北，台北!; published 1983), both written while he was in jail as a political prisoner.

== Political career ==
After being freed from prison in 1984, he joined the political opposition to the ruling Kuomintang and in 1995 was elected to Taiwan's Legislative Yuan as a Democratic Progressive Party (DPP) member for Keelung City. Wang formed an alliance with the DPP's Formosa faction, which disbanded after its leader Hsu Hsing-liang left the party. In 2002, Wang became a member of the Justice faction.

Wang was nominated by the DPP to run for Keelung City mayor in 2005. After contentious discussions with the Taiwan Solidarity Union, the DPP agreed to withdraw Wang's nomination to support the TSU's Chen Chien-ming. However, Wang remained on the ballot, and finished fourth in the election.

2005 Keelung City Mayoralty Election result
No.	Candidate	Party	Votes
1	Chen Chien-ming	TSU	58,243
2	Hsu Tsai-li	KMT	76,162
3	Liu Wen-hsiung	PFP	47,932
4	Wang Tuoh	DPP	2,771

Commenting on the 2007 summit between South Korean President Roh Moo-hyun and North Korean leader Kim Jong-il, Wang noted that their talks offered a model for negotiations between China and Taiwan held on an equal footing and based on mutual respect. Lamenting that China refuses to recognise Taiwan as a sovereign, independent state, he urged China to support a bid for UN recognition for Taiwan also called for the removal of the 900 Chinese missiles deployed along its southeastern coast that threaten Taiwan militarily.

After losing his seat in the legislature in January 2008, Wang was appointed chairman of the Council for Cultural Affairs, a cabinet-level position. From this position, Wang pushed for substantial increases to the culture budget. In May 2008, Wang was appointed by chairwoman Tsai Ing-wen to serve as the Secretary General of the DPP. In taking on the position, Wang chose not to be paid. He helped the party out of a NT$150 million debt, while reducing its bureaucracy and infighting shortly after the 2008 elections.

Wang died in Taipei on 9 August 2016 at the age of 72, due to complications of a heart attack. His funeral was held on 6 September.
