= Taiwan nativist literature =

Taiwan nativist literature (Chinese: 鄉土文學; pinyin: Xiangtu Wenxue; Pe̍h-ōe-jī: Hiong-thó͘ Bûn-ha̍k). Xiangtu (鄉土), literally meaning the hometown soil, symbolizes nativism; and Wenxue (文學) is literature. It is a genre of Taiwanese literature derived from the New Literature Movement (台灣新文學運動) under the Japanese rule in the 1920s. The movement died down after 1937 when the Japanese government strengthened its colonial policy, but regained public attention in the 1970s. Taiwan nativist literature uses literary realism as its main narrative to depict people, events and subjects that happen in Taiwan, aiming at reflecting the particularity of the local society. The nativist novels usually depict the struggles for existence and predicaments of identity of the Taiwanese people with a humanistic tone. They tend to base on the life experiences of their authors, and reflect their worldviews.

== The Taiwan New Literature movement ==
Under the colonial modernization in Taiwan, through colonial education, study in Japan and China, Taiwan’s first generation intellectuals were informed of modern politics, society, culture and ideas of the West. They embraced concepts such as national self-determination, democracy, freedom, and socialism. They were also inspired by various events such as the Taishō Democracy Movement, socialist movement and leftist movement in Japan, and the May Fourth Movement, the New Culture Movement, and anti-imperialism movement in China. Since the 1920s, Taiwanese intellectuals had moved away from violent resistance into organized and non-violent, cultural, political and social struggles against the Japanese government.

In 1920, Cai Huiru (蔡惠如) et al. founded the Xin Min Society (新民会) in Tokyo in January and published Taiwan Youth (《台湾青年》) magazine in July, in order to promote cultural enlightenment. In response, Chiang Wei-shui (蔣渭水) et al. founded the Taiwan Culture Association (台湾文化协会) in Taiwan in 1921, which was the prelude of the anti-colonial and national emancipatory movements there. The Association shared the same anti-imperialist spirit with the May Fourth Movement in China. The literature movement was brought into Taiwan as a tool to exercise cultural enlightenment, increase education standards and to awaken the public to stand up against the colonial authority.

The Taiwan New Literature movement incorporated the May Fourth Literature model, engaging with language reform and literary realism. First, it tried to synchronize speaking with writing (言文合一) by promoting the use of modern Chinese (白話文) as opposed to classical Chinese (文言文). The use of modern Chinese could help increase the general literacy and keep connection with China, and it symbolized the erection of the New and the abandon of the Old. Zhang Wojun (張我軍) was one of the main advocates who positioned Taiwan literature as a branch of Chinese literature, tried to bring in more Chinese elements into Taiwan literature, and wanted to use modern Chinese to reform the Taiwanese vernacular. Second, as being positioned as a branch of Chinese literature, the Movement aimed at liberating Taiwan from Japanese colonizers with an intention to return to China. It followed the anti-imperialist and anti-feudalist realistic style of the May Fourth literature. Here, the use of modern Chinese against the then official language of Taiwan—Japanese also played an important role to support the advocates’ Chinese identity.

== The Rise of Taiwan nativist literature ==
However, the ultimate goal of the Taiwan New Literature movement was not to preserve Chinese language, culture or literature, but to awaken the Taiwanese public and to liberate Taiwan. The colonial Taiwan had a different situation than mainland China regarding to its colonial policy, social awareness and natural environment etc. Hence, that whether the May Fourth model was completely suitable for Taiwan was under challenge. Soon as the Movement started in 1920, there were intellectuals like Zhuang Chuisheng (庄垂盛) who challenged whether modern Chinese was compatible with the local situation in Taiwan, and Lian Wenqing (連温卿) who underlined the importance to study and utilize Taiwan vernacular since it was the most popularized language in Taiwan. In 1925, Huang Chengcong (黄呈聰) in his essay ‘We should establish a particular Taiwanese culture’ (应该著创设台湾特种的文化) argued that although Taiwan shared the same bloodline with China in aspects like race, society, culture and custom, the unique geography and environment of Taiwan had cultivated a particularity in its own culture in its 200-year history; and especially after it was ceded to Japan, Taiwan was different from China in its society and culture under the Japanese rule; all these experiences had made the native-ity (本土性) of Taiwan easily perceptible. Huang suggested that considering this native-ity, Taiwan should not totally and uncritically accept Chinese culture (like the May Fourth Literature model), but adapt the imported culture according to the native reality and so establish a particular Taiwanese culture.

In 1927, the Kuomintang-Communist cooperation broke down. Chiang Kai-shek ordered a crackdown on the workers’ and peasants’ movements in China. That the Chinese anti-imperialist movement reached a deadlock disappointed the Taiwanese intellectuals. Meanwhile, the Japanese authority tightened the colonial policy which cut off the connection and support from mainland China. Furthermore, by February 1931, almost all the anti-Japanese organizations in Taiwan had been dissolved. More intellectuals turned to the literature movement, which was less annoying to the Japanese. The Taiwan New Literature movement reached its heyday, and the nativism in literature also started to rise.

== Taiwan nativist literature in the 1930s ==
In 1930 and 1931, Huang Shihui, followed by Guo Qiusen, launched the Nativist Literature Polemic (鄉土文學論戰) and the Taiwanese Vernacular Polemic (台灣話文論戰), which marked the full bloom of the Taiwan New Literature movement. According to Ye Shitao (葉石濤), the Polemics showed that the object of the Taiwan New Literature reform had moved from forms into contents, and Taiwan literature began to move towards independence from the Chinese New Literature Movement.

=== The Nativist Literature Polemic ===
In 1930, Huang Shihui published the essay ‘Why not promote Taiwan nativist literature’ (怎麼不提倡台灣鄉土文學) in the Wu Ren newspaper (《伍人報》), gaining some debate. In the next year, Huang and Guo Qiusen published essays ‘Talk about nativist literature again’ (再谈乡土文学) and ‘A proposal to develop Taiwanese vernacular’ (建設‘台湾話文’一提案) respectively in Taiwan News (《台湾新聞》), triggering a large-scale debate on whether it was feasible to use Taiwanese vernacular in writing Taiwan nativist literature.

Huang’s opinion was similar to idea of popularization upheld by the worldwide proletarian literature movement which saw the toiling masses as the main audience of literary creations. Huang insisted that only by using Taiwanese vernacular to write could literature penetrate into the masses and have influence on them. He also contended that Taiwan is the home of Taiwanese writers, so they should treat Taiwan and its public as the focal points in their literature. A colonial fact about Taiwan was that the official language was Japanese; modern Chinese could not be taught in the education system. Furthermore, Standard Chinese, which is based on the Beijing vernacular, was different from the Taiwanese vernacular which was widely used in Taiwan in those days. Modern Chinese, like Japanese, stayed as a language used in the small intellectual circle. Insisting on using modern Chinese to write could not attain the expected result of synchronizing writing with speaking (文言一致) like it did in mainland China. In other words, modern Chinese could not penetrate into the masses and fulfil its mission of the dissemination of culture. Guo in his essay illustrated the fact that Japanese, classical and modern Chinese were all difficult to be popularized among the masses, and responded the Huang’s stand by suggesting promoting the use of Taiwanese vernacular in order to eradicate illiteracy and disperse culture. Guo also proposed to subjugate writing to speaking (屈文就話). He started a special column called ‘Taiwanese vernacular attempt’ (台湾話文嘗試欄), where he created many new ‘Chinese’ characters to match those words specifically used in the Taiwanese vernacular. He proved that it was feasible to write in Taiwanese vernacular. In summary, in the polemics, nativism advocates contended that firstly, nativist literature should be written in Taiwanese vernacular and secondly, authors should reflect the reality of Taiwan in their works and highlight the existence of the nativity of Taiwan.

On the contrary, the opponents in the polemics who did not think literature should be written in Taiwanese vernacular argued that Taiwan and China should stay in one perspective; literary works written in Taiwanese vernacular lacked universality across China; and being too linguistically and culturally Taiwanese would hinder the cultural exchange between China and Taiwan. They insisted that Taiwan was part of China and it was not necessary to start a Taiwan nativist literature. Some opponents even saw Taiwanese vernacular as a primitive and crude language, so it was not good enough to be used in literature. Most of the opponents insisted in using modern Chinese. The opponents included Liao Yuwen, Lin Kefu, Zhu Dianren (廖毓文，林克夫，朱點人) and so on. Nevertheless, despite the difference, opponents and advocates of nativism shared the same standpoints of anti-Japanese colonization.

=== Publications, Societies, and Active Authors ===
From 1926 to 1937, literary publications and arts societies gradually sprang up in Taiwan. Most of them had anti-Japanese sentiments, and aimed at encouraging patriotism among the Taiwanese public. In 1927, Chen Manying, Lai He and Chen Shaoxin (陈满盈，赖和，陈绍馨) founded the New Student Study Society (新生学会), while overseas students in Japan, Xu Naichang, Yang Yunping, Yang Gui (许乃昌，杨云萍，杨贵) et al. organized the Social Science Study Group (社会科学研究部). In 1932, Zhuang Chuisheng, Ia̍p Êng-cheng (庄垂胜，葉營鐘) et al. published the Southern Voice (《南音》) magazine. In March 1933, overseas students Zhang Wenhuan, Wu Yongfu, Wang Baiyuan, Liu Jie, Su Weixiong, Shi Xuexi (張文環，巫永福，王白淵，劉捷，蘇維熊，施學習) et al. founded the Taiwan Arts Society (台湾藝術研究会) in Tokyo, and published the Formosa (《福爾摩沙》) magazine. In October 1933, Guo Qiusen, Liao Hanchen, Huang Deshi, Wang Shilang, Chen Junyu, Lin Kefu (郭秋生，廖漢臣，黄得時，王詩琅，陳君玉，林克夫) et al. founded the Taiwan Literature Association (台湾文藝协会) in Taipei, and published the Starting Force (《先發部隊》) magazine which was later renamed First Line (《第一線》). In 1934, the Taiwan Arts Society and the Taiwan Literature Association amalgamated into the Taiwan Literature and Arts League (台湾文藝聯盟), and the League published the Taiwan Literature and Arts (台湾文藝) magazine. In 1935, Yang Kui (楊逵) and his wife left the Taiwan Literature and Arts magazine, and founded the Taiwan New Literature Society (台湾新文学社) with Ye Tao (葉陶) and his wife. They published the New Taiwanese Literature (台湾新文学) magazine.

The active Taiwanese authors during this period included Lai He, Zhang Wojun, Yang Yunping, Yang Shouyu (楊守愚), Cai Choudong (蔡愁洞), Zhu Dianren, Xu Gu (虛谷), Guo Qiusen, Yang Hua (楊華), Wang Shilang, Zhang Qingtang (張慶堂), Zhang Shenqie (張深切), Huang Deshi, Wu Yongfu, Wu Tianshang (吳天賞), Wang Baiyuan et al.

== The suppression of Nativist Literature ==
In the late stage of the Japanese colonization, there were a lot of literary works written in Japanese by Taiwanese authors coming into existence. This generation of authors did not have bilingual background as did their predecessors. Japanese was the only literal medium through which they understood the world and expressed their opinions. Thus, the Taiwanese vernacular polemic had lost its symbolic meaning to them. However, though they had to write in Japanese, they preserved very strong Taiwanese ideology and native-ity in their works. In April 1937, the Governor-General of Taiwan forbade the use of Chinese. Chinese writers nearly had to stop working completely. In July, the Second Sino-Japanese War began. In September, the colonial authority imposed the Kominka movement in order to replace Taiwanese culture and suppress the nationalism of Taiwanese people. In 1941, Zhang Wenhuan, Wang Jingquan (王井泉), Huang Deshi et al. left the Literature and Arts of Taiwan (《文艺台湾》) magazine which was controlled by Nishikawa Mitsuru (西川満) and organized the Qi Wen Society (启文社), and they published the Taiwan Literature (《台湾文学》) magazine for eleven volumes. In November 1943, Nishikawa announced the prohibition of association. Both the Literature and Arts of Taiwan and the Taiwan Literature were dismissed. Taiwanese authors lost their autonomy in writing. The following literary works were mostly done in order to meet the need of the Japanese invasions. However, there were still authors like Wu Zhuoliu who risked his life to write ‘The Orphan of Asia’ (亞細亞孤兒), recording the stories of Taiwanese people and sustaining the resistant spirit. After the defeat of Japan in August 1945, the then mainland-based Chinese nationalist KMT, under Chiang Kai-Shek, seized the island with the aim of re-uniting Taiwan with rest of China, and any assertion of local Taiwanese difference from China was suppressed.

== Taiwanese identity ==
After the period of suppression, another literary movement arose in the 1970s and 1980s, seeking to establish recognition of a distinctly Taiwanese body of literature. The Taiwanese literature movement expanded into democratization of the 1980s and 1990s.
