= Two by Twos in Australia and New Zealand =

Christian sect in Australia

In Australia and New Zealand, Two by Twos is a small Christian sect that has been active for at least one hundred years. This organisation does not have an official name but is referred to as ‘The Truth’, ‘The Way,’ ‘Two by Twos’, ‘2x2’, ‘Truth 2x2’, ‘The Church with No Name’, ‘Cooneyites’, ‘Friends and Workers’, ‘The Meetings’, ‘The Fellowship’, ‘Christian Conventions’, ‘Assemblies of Christians’, and ‘Christian Missionaries Australia’, Non Denominational Christians amongst a multiplicity of names.

Two by Twos was founded in Ireland by William Irvine in 1897 and the first known reference to the organisation in Australia is in 1907. Practices slightly differ by region, but they have an overarching organisational structure (see Structure and Finances).

The Australasian Two by Twos largely follow the international doctrine, which is a conservative interpretation of the King James Bible. They are nontrinitarian and they have almost no written records, instead preferring to transmit their beliefs orally through itinerant ministers known as ‘Workers’. They have no official church property or buildings, instead meeting in members’ houses. While the organisation doesn’t officially hold property, some members hold property which is used for church gatherings, including yearly conventions. The church is made up of a collection of family groups with very little outside recruitment.

While it professes to reject formal structure the organisation has been registered previously in Australia for official purposes under a few names including ‘Christian Conventions of Victoria’, ‘Christian Assemblies of Australia’, and variations on ‘United Christian Conventions’ (eg. ‘The United Christian Conventions of Australasia and New Zealand’). In New Zealand the organisation was previously registered under ‘United Christian Assemblies’ and ‘Christian Conventions’. In its application to the National Redress Scheme (which came out of the Royal Commission into Institutional Responses to Child Sexual Abuse in Australia), the organisation applied under the name 'The Non-denominational Christians (The Truth)' but this name is otherwise not officially registered anywhere. The organisation is currently not registered as a company or charity anywhere in New Zealand.

Refer to Two by Twos for further background on history, doctrine and structure.

== Structure and Finances ==
=== Structure ===
Despite denying any formal structure, Two by Twos in Australia and New Zealand follow a model that was established by founder William Irvine in 1908 and is known worldwide. Each country is divided into regions, usually whole states, which are ruled by a male Overseer. Regions are broken into fields which are assigned to a pair of ministers called ‘Workers’ (which is the source of the name ‘Two by Twos’). Fields are then broken up into ‘house churches’, which means a residence where the oldest male has been assigned the title of ‘Elder’, and he holds meetings within his home. The house churches consist of up to thirty-five members or ‘Friends’. Workers are assigned to their fields annually and move between different cities and countries. Workers are celibate and itinerant; they travel around staying at different members’ homes.

The Let’s Talk About Sects podcast states that an Overseer has “absolute authority” over those below him in the structure and that “members may follow his commands as if they were God’s commands.”

Journalist Chris Johnston gave the following description of the structure of the cult to Let’s Talk About Sects: “Sort of state by state. So it's usually one man and that man will have a male assistant, like a PA who, for example, in Queensland at the moment, the PA who's just a helper, like emails, letters, just shitkicker basically, but he's also very influential and powerful. So there's leader, leader’s helper, and then there's the trustees, the guys who hold the money and there might be one, two or three of those and then there'll be a sort of hierarchy down through the ranks of the sect and through a sort of familial type rank as well. So certain families can become very powerful.”

Members of the Australasian Two by Twos are typically kept ignorant of the structure of the organisation.

In 2023 a community association was registered in South Australia (see ASIC here)

=== Finances ===
The financial structure of the Australasian Two by Twos is opaque but there is evidence that the organisation has considerable assets. Workers receive cash donations in envelopes from members (or ‘Friends’) and the organisation has received large bequests. In 1994 former overseer of Victoria John “Evan” Jones stated that the organisation was “financially well-off” and that money was kept in a trust fund controlled by three elders. In 2013 anonymous sources told Australian journalist Chris Johnston that the organisation was still “well-off” and that money was kept in private bank accounts. Johnston estimates that the assets are in the order of “multiple millions of dollars per state… and territory”. An anonymous former Worker from New Zealand said that senior Workers received cash donations of hundreds of thousands of dollars per year but were exempt from paying taxes. He stated that as the junior partner in a pair of Workers he was denied access to money and was forced to justify all expenditures to the senior Worker. An anonymous recent leaver from New Zealand stated that he believed the organisation had millions of dollars and wondered “are people actually being forced to do some pretty dodgy legal stuff just because the church refuses to have a bank account in its own name?" This person was concerned with the lack of transparency around money within the organisation.

ABC reported in January 2026 on the sale of Mudgee Convention Ground in NSW and lack of transparency around finances, organisational name and structures.

== List of Overseers in Australia and New Zealand ==
The following is a list of known overseers in Australia and New Zealand. Names on the list that are not directly referenced come from this reference

Location	Year	Name
New South Wales	1907-1961	John Hardie
	1961-1963	Joe Williamson
	1963-1994	Gordon McNab
	1994-1995	Dan McNab
	1995-2016	Clyde McKay
	2016 - unknown	Alan Kitto /Allan Kitto
	2024, 2025	Graham Dalton
	2026 (to June)	David Saunders
South Australia	1907-1922	Adam Hutchison
	1922-1941/44?	Willie Hughes
	1944-1964	John Baartz
	1964-1994	Robert Barbour
	1994-2009	Stan Cornthwaite
	2025	Trevor Joll
	2026 (to June)	Graeme Dalton
Tasmania	1914-1922	Adam Hutchison
	1922-1938	Sam Jones
	1925 - unknown (now incorporated into Victoria)	Chris Williams
Victoria and Tasmania	1907-1909	Adam Hutchison
	1909-1913	Wilson McClung
	1913-1953	Bill Carroll
	1954-55	Chris Williams
	1957-85	Willie Donaldson
	1987-2001	John "Evan" Jones
	2001-2014	John Robinson
	2014-2018	David Leitch
	2018	Jim McLean
	2018 - unknown	Allan Mitchell
	2025 -	Malcolm Clapham
Queensland	1906-1924	John Sullivan
	1924-1959	Thomas Turner
	1959-1972	Archie Turner
	1972-2002	Albert Barnes
	2002-2014	Ray Corbett
	2014 - Unknown	Malcolm Clapham
	2025-	Allan Mitchell
Western Australia	1906-1924	Tom Turner
	1924-28	Ted Terry
	1928-38	Nestor Ferguson
	1939	Willie Phyn
	1939-1946	Sam Jones
	1950-1955	Walter Schloss
	1956-1964	Bert Cameron
	1964-1979	Clem Geue
	1979-2007/08	Bill McCourt
	2009-2017	Peter Doecke
	2018 - unknown	Graham Snow
	2024 -	Stephen Thorpe
New Zealand	2025	Wayne Dean
	2026	Trevor Joll

== Demographics ==
Two by Twos doesn’t have official records of member numbers, but estimates have been made. The increasing number of people who are leaving suggest that the overall number of members is significantly reducing.

In 2013 Chris Johnston, reporting for The Age, estimated that there were 2,000 members in Victoria. In 2020 former member Laura McConnell-Conti estimated that there were 2,000 members in Victoria and 4,000 each in Queensland and New South Wales. In 2024 Tobi Loftus, reporting for the ABC, estimated that there were 8,000 members across Australia. In 2024 Amy Williams reported for RNZ that there are 2,500 members in New Zealand and 60 ministers.

Historically Two by Twos may have had much larger numbers in Australia. Former member Laura McConnell-Conti estimated that there were 50,000 members across Australia in the 1980's and 1990's.

Two by Twos congregations are typically concentrated in isolated rural farming communities and regional areas, but they can also be found in cities. In Australia they have been reported as being in Wodonga, Shepparton, Launceston, rural Tasmania, and Pheasant Creek, but this is not an exhaustive list. They are active in every state of Australia.

== Practices ==
Due to the lack of records there are no official behavioural rules for members of Two by Twos, but behaviour is still strictly controlled. Behavioural rules vary by region and are typically determined by individual Workers and then laterally enforced amongst members. Former member Elizabeth Coleman describes it as follows: “I learned very quickly that workers held the ultimate authority in our life. Anything they disapproved of in even the mildest terms became another unwritten rule.”

There are many examples of behaviour that is prohibited including

- television
- radios
- stereos
- movies
- smoking
- drinking
- illegal drug use
- swearing
- gambling
- dancing
- reading Christian books or literature
- Christian symbols
- “current fads or fashion” including an example of directives against coloured shoes and denim
- jewelry
- short hair on women (with a particular hair style encouraged)
- long hair on men
- women wearing shorts, slacks, or trousers
- make up
- school camps or trips
- sports or extra curricular activities
- activities with friends outside the group
- celebrating Christmas
- LGBTIQA+ people

There are severely limited gender and sexuality roles, especially for women and girls, with members of the LGBTIQA+ community being excommunicated. Girls tend to only complete a few years of high school and then marry young, though they can enter the workforce in a limited variety of feminised roles.

== Controversies ==
The Two by Twos have a documented history of failing to adequately respond to child sexual abuse. The organisation was associated with a child double suicide. It has also been accused of being a cult.

=== Child sexual abuse ===
In 2019 the current affairs show 60 Minutes interviewed victims of child sex abuse who had been targeted by Workers and members. Noel Harvey, Ernie Barry, Chris Chandler, Cecil James Blyth and Greg Aylett were named as having been convicted of sex crimes against children, and New South Wales Overseer Allan Kitto was accused of covering up child sexual abuse within the organisation. The report stated that victims who complained faced shunning while even convicted perpetrators were protected. Furthermore, a 2013 investigation by Chris Johnston for the Age states that Chandler positioned himself as a counsellor and a point of contact for victims of child sexual abuse within the organisation. Johnston observed that Australian perpetrators he was investigating often spent long periods working for the organisation within developing countries.

In 2024 RNZ reported that the FBI had partnered with law enforcement in New Zealand as part of a larger investigation into child sexual abuse within the organisation internationally. They also reported that New Zealand police were investigating at least one former minister for child sexual abuse, and a Two by Twos spokesperson confirmed that there were fourteen cases of allegations against members. In 2024 former member and advocate Jillian Hishon shared that the Brave Truth Australia and New Zealand telephone hotline had identified 140 perpetrators within the Australasian organisation, 20% of whom were in New Zealand.

Former members consider the abuse a result of the culture of secrecy and the power imbalances within the organisation; the organisation’s resistance to criticism due to the perceived perfection of their beliefs; and the practice of hosting celibate, itinerant Workers within members’ homes.

In July 2023 the Australasian overseers responded to the ongoing issue of child sexual abuse with a letter to members. They followed this up with a website launched in 2024 that contains resources and an apology letter, and that features a banner urging members to report child sexual abuse to local authorities. Former members have criticised the response, especially the decision to keep the advisory group anonymous. Survivor advocate Laura McConnell-Conti has criticised the Australian Two by Twos for failing to meaningfully engage in the National Redress Scheme which emerged as a result of the Royal Commission into Institutional Responses to Child Sexual Abuse, thus depriving victims of compensation.

=== Child suicides ===
In 1994 at Pheasant Creek in Victoria siblings 14-year-old Narelle Henderson and 12-year-old Stephen Henderson shot themselves to avoid attending a four-day Two by Two convention. Narelle wrote the suicide note: We committed suicide because all our life we were made to go to meetings. They try to brainwash us so much and have ruined our lives.

=== Cult ===
Some people believe that Two by Twos is a cult or a ‘high-demand’ group due to its secrecy, exclusivity and high level of control of members.

In an appearance on the Let’s Talk About Sects podcast former member Laura McConnell-Conti stated that she believed that Two by Twos easily fulfilled two of the program’s three criteria for a cult - that they have exclusive access to the truth, and that they’re secretive - but they do not fit the criteria of having a charismatic leader.

The church is extremely secretive, with no official name, few written records, and a practice of members describing themselves to outsiders and the census as “Christian non-denominational”. Many of its own members aren’t aware of basic details such as the origins of the organisation and its structure.

Two by Twos is a church that practices exclusivity, meaning that it considers itself to be the only true religion and therefore the only path to salvation. This is part of its stated reason for not having a name. A strong distrust of anyone outside the group, especially external authorities, is encouraged.

Former member Kathleen Lewis believes that the Two by Twos are a highly controlling group employing methods of information control, thought control, emotion control and behaviour control. She says “The Workers reserve the right to interpret the scripture and to decide what activities Friends may do. The congregation is discouraged from thinking for themselves regarding scripture. The congregation cannot initiate any activity without permission of the workers.” Members are taught “thought-stopping mantras” to discourage them from dwelling on doubts. Members who do not comply, who raise complaints or who leave are subject to shunning and excommunication. Members are told that if they leave they will die due to “divine punishment”.

The Two by Twos have been named in a parliamentary inquiry into cults and fringe groups in Victoria, Australia, with several public submissions on Two by Two group coercive behaviour noted, submissions numbered 81, 90 159 184 and 201 are Truth 2x2 / Two by Two related.

== Breakaway Groups ==
The Cooneyites and The Barlow Group are breakaway groups that are active in Australia and New Zealand.

Edward Cooney broke with the main Two by Twos organisation in 1928, forming the new organisation which is colloquially named for him. However the term ‘Cooneyites’ can also refer to members of the main group or the Bob Barlow Group (this is an unfortunate consequence of having multiple groups with no official name).

The Barlow Group was formed by Bob Barlow and is active in Queensland.

== Notable Australian New Zealand 2x2 Members ==
Hamish Campbell, a NZ member of parliament, was reported in 2025 to be an active member of the group in New Zealand.
