= Yataro Miyata =

- 宮田 弥太郎
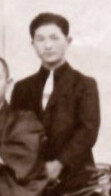
- Yataro Miyata in a group photo from 1930 Kantansha Experimental Exhibition
- Born: September 4, 1906; Tokyo, Japan
- Died: May 6, 1968 (aged 61); Tokyo, Japan
- Citizenship: Japan

Miyata Yataro (Japanese: 宮田 弥太郎/みやた やたろう; September 4, 1906 – May 6, 1968), whose pen names were Miyata Hanan, Miyata Harmitsu, and Miyata Aomu, was a painter and printmaker during the Japanese colonial period in Taiwan. He was a friend of Japanese writer Mitsuru Nishikawa, who resided in Taiwan.

== Life and career ==
=== Birth and early study ===
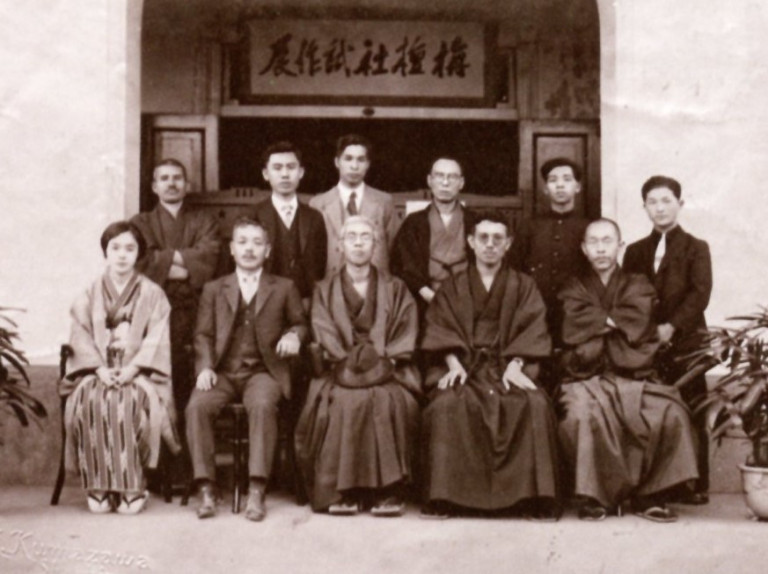
A group photo taken at the 1930 Kantansha Experimental Exhibition, with Yataro Miyata on the right in the back row.

On September 4, 1906 (Meiji 39), Miyata Yataro was born in Tokyo, the eldest son of Miyata Yasanyoshi, and his mother was Yuna. The family moved to Taiwan in 1907, so Miyata can be considered a " born in Taiwan " in a broad sense. In 1922, Miyata entered the private Taiwan Commercial School (now Kainan Senior High School in Taipei City ) and was introduced by his classmate Haruo Kiyoe to meet Mitsuru Nishikawa, who was studying at Taipei Middle School at the time. Later, Yataro Miyata, Haruo Kiyie, and Mitsuru Nishikawa founded the magazine "Primakusa" and printed 150 copies. They were sold on consignment at Shinkodo Bookstore, Bunkido Bookstore, and Sugita Bookstore, and the magazine was sold out on the same day. This is the first collaboration between Mitsuru Nishikawa and Yataro Miyata.

=== Study in Beijing ===
In 1925, Yataro Miyata graduated from the private Taiwan Commercial School. He briefly worked in the painting department of the Taiwan Offset Printing Company and also as a temporary employee in the Taipei District Court. In December 1926, he went to Tokyo and entered the Kawabata Painting School to study painting under the tutelage of the Japanese painter Noda Hisura. In the same year, the first Taiwan Art Exhibition was held in Taiwan, and his work Flower Cage Otome was selected for the Oriental Painting Department. From 1928 until he returned to Taiwan in 1929, Miyata studied painting while working at the Tokyo Institute of Art. Art News Agency, in the illustrations department.

=== Taiwan's creative period ===
In March 1929, Miyata returned to Taiwan and served as a temporary employee in the editing section of the Cultural and Educational Bureau of the Government-General of Taiwan, specializing in drawing illustrations for textbooks. He also worked at the Taiwan Daily News. In terms of art achievements, he was selected for the Taiwan Art Exhibition and the Taiwan Governor's Office Art Exhibition every year. In 1936, at the 10th Taiwan Art Exhibition, his work "Mo Chou" was selected as a unique selection by the Oriental Painting Department. In 1938, at the first Art Exhibition of the Governor-General's Office in Taiwan, his work "Darkness" won the Special Selection from the Oriental Painting Department and the Governor-General's Award. The first art group that Yataro Miyata joined during the Japanese colonial period was the Oriental painting group "Tandansha," founded in December 1930 under the leadership of Gohara Kotō. In January 1935, the "Creative Printmaking Association" was established with Mitsuru Nishikawa, Tetsuomi Tateishi, Yoshimitsu Furukawa, Keiichi Fukui, Tsuruko Nomura, Sako Ohse, and others. The association has a close relationship with the magazine "Mazu," edited by Mitsuru Nishikawa. Most of the illustrations in "Mazu" are by Miyata Yataro and Tateishi Tetsuomi. In addition to "Mazu," Nishikawa Mitsuru's book "Asia" (July 1937) and his literary and art magazine " Bungei Taiwan " were also illustrated by Miyata Yataro and Tateishi Tetsuomi. The relationship between Mitsuru Nishikawa and Yataro Miyata can also be seen in the publication of Mitsuru Nishikawa's books. On April 8, 1935, Nishikawa Manchu published the poetry collection "Mazu Festival" (Taipei: Mazu Study, limited to 300 copies), and the books were bound by Miyata. Later, Miyata Yataro was responsible for the binding of Nishikawa Mitsuru's works "Cat Temple" (December 1936), picture books "Momotaro" (May 1938), "Journey to the West" (1942–1943), and other works. In 1943, Yataro Miyata served as a director of the Taiwan Art Association. The following year, he was drafted into the army and joined the machine gun unit. When Japan was defeated in August 1945, Miyata was relieved of his call and recuperated at home after suffering from asthma.Deported back to Tokyo in 1946.

=== Post-repatriation period to Japan ===
Miyata returned to Tokyo and lived with Nishikawa Mitsuru in the Taiwan Yin Yang Room in Asagaya. At that time, his illness became more serious, and drinking alcohol made his body even weaker.His mother died in 1959, which deeply affected Miyata. As a result, his condition worsened and he was paralyzed, so he was hospitalized. He died of illness on May 6, 1968 (Shōwa 43), at the age of 62.His printmaking legacy was eventually included in the 1973 Nishikawa Manchu poetry collection "Persimmon Song Ri no Song." In June 1997, Mitsuru Nishikawa's "Renjen no Hoshisha" published "The Love of Gorgeous Island - A Collection of Prints by Yataro Miyata," which is currently the only collection of Yataro Miyata's works.

== Selected works from Taiwan's official exhibitions of the era ==
=== Taiwan Art Exhibition ===
- 1st (1927) East and Western Painting Club "A Maiden with a Flower Canopy" (also known as "Shinta Hunan")
- 2nd (1928) Eastern and Western Painting Club "Conversation"
- The third session (1929) Oriental Painting Department "The Sound of Pure Spring"
- The fourth session (1930) Oriental Painting Department "Women's Friendship" and "Evening Reflection"
- Chapter 5 (1931) Oriental Painting Department "Green Shade"
- Chapter 6 (1932) Oriental Painting Department "Shocking of the Flying Spring"
- 7th (1933) Eastern and Western Painting Club "Ochibano Nimo"
- Chapter 8 (1934) Oriental Painting Department "Taixiaocao"
- Chapter 9 (1935) Oriental Painting Department "The Story of a Female Admonished Fan"
- Chapter 10 (1936) Oriental Painting Department "Mo Chou" ( Special Selection )

=== Taiwan Governor's Office Art Exhibition ===
- The first session (1938) Oriental Painting Department "Hongming" ( Special Selection, Governor's Award )
- The second round (1939) Oriental Painting Department "Jingchen" ( recommendation )
- The third session (1940) Oriental Painting Department "Wind"
- The fourth session (1941) Oriental Painting Department "Yabei Tarozaemon"
- Chapter 5 (1942) Oriental Painting Department "Chrysanthemum" ( recommended, under the name of "Miyata Harumi")
- Chapter 6 (1943) Oriental Painting Department "Ship Repair" ( recommended, under the name of "Miyata Harumi")

== Portfolio ==
- Mitsuru Nishikawa, "Love at Gorgeous Island - Collection of Prints by Yataro Miyata" (Tokyo: Renjen no Hoshisha, June 1997).

== Related research ==
- Hong Qianhe, "The Painter's Left Hand: A Study of Printmaking in Taiwan during the Japanese Occupation" (Taipei: Master's thesis, Institute of Art History, National Taiwan University, 2004).
- Lin Zhujun, "Beautiful Distance - The "Gorgeous Island" Under the Gaze of Yataro Miyata," "Yi Yi Li Zhi" Issue 5 (March 2003), pp. 1-15.
