= Killings at Coolacrease =

Killings in the Irish War of Independence

The killings at Coolacrease was an incident that took place in County Offaly during the Irish War of Independence. In late June 1921, Irish Republican Army (IRA) volunteers came under fire at a roadblock in the rural area of Coolacrease (near Cadamstown). The roadblock was located at the boundary of land owned by loyalist farmer William Pearson. On 30 June, his sons Richard (aged 24) and Abraham (aged 19) Pearson were shot by an IRA firing squad and their house was burnt.

== The Pearsons of Coolacrease ==
In 1911, the Pearsons moved to Coolacrease from neighbouring County Laois. They bought a 341-acre (1.38 km^{2}) farm and worked it successfully. They are said to have belonged to a Protestant religious movement commonly referred to as Cooneyites or Two by Twos. However, in the 1911 census they listed their religion as Church of Ireland.

Initially, the Pearsons integrated well into the local community, and their children attended the local Catholic school in Cadamstown, where one of them was a member of the hurling team. Following the Sinn Féin electoral successes in the elections of December 1918 a majority of the Irish elected representatives implemented their election manifesto by establishing the First Dáil on 21 January 1919. In the Irish War of Independence military hostilities between the IRA and British forces developed into a bitter guerrilla conflict in 1920 and 1921.

In County Offaly, where the Pearsons had their farm at Coolacrease, the military conflict was slow to develop, but it intensified in the course of 1921. A number of Catholics, classified by the IRA as spies and informers, were executed. In Kinnitty, about five miles (8 km) from Coolacrease, two members of the Royal Irish Constabulary (RIC, the militarized police force which was the principal agency of the British state in Ireland) were killed in an ambush by the IRA on 17 May 1921. Following a June 1921 dispute between the Pearsons and local Catholics over a mass path running through the Pearsons' land, two IRA men, John Dillon and JJ Horan, were arrested.

== The shootings ==
In June 1921, the Kinnitty Company of the South Offaly No 2 Brigade IRA was ordered to construct a roadblock as part of county-wide military manoeuvres. At around midnight some of the Pearsons are said to have come to the roadblock and fired a shot or shots.

An eight-man IRA roadblock party selected a tree to fell for a roadblock on the Birr to Tullamore road, about halfway between the Pearsons' house and the village of Cadamstown. The roadside tree was at the point of boundary between the Pearsons' and a neighbouring farm about half a mile from their house. Two men were posted as sentries on the road to either side of the planned road-block. According to Paddy Heaney, at about midnight steps were heard approaching along the road from the direction of Pearsons' house. Sentry Mick Heaney issued the verbal challenge "Halt! Who goes there?" In response shots were fired at him, wounding him in the abdomen, arm and neck. The other sentry ran to his assistance and both returned fire. The other sentry, Tom Donnelly, was shot in the head. A retired RIC man who had been detained by them was also shot by the attackers. The abdominal injuries of Mick Heaney were serious, and he died a few years later. The retired RIC man was seriously injured in the back and legs, and lost a lung. In this version, the Pearsons had, as loyalists, become hostile to the local community as the war intensified, leading to their participation as combatants in the war.

According to one alternative account, the Pearsons fired a single shotgun cartridge in the air as a warning to rebels who were damaging their property while Alan Stanley wrote,"A cousin of my father's, Oliver Stanley, told me that after the tree had been felled, a number of men came to man the barricade thus created, and were shortly afterwards surprised by security people (police and auxiliaries presumably). He said that a brief gun battle had ensued and a man was injured on each side."

Following official investigation,Philip McConway articles in Officers' Battalion Council, into the identity of the men who attacked the road-block, Thomas Burke, the IRA Officer Commanding South Offaly No. 2 Brigade, ordered that the three brothers Richard, Abraham, and Sidney Pearson were to be executed and their houses destroyed. The orders to shoot the Pearsons would have come directly from IRA headquarters, and not made locally. However McConway indicates the decision to execute was made by Burke himself.

On 30 June 1921, about a week after the roadblock shootings, a party of about thirty IRA men arrested Richard and Abraham Pearson. They were taken to their house and held under guard there with other members of the family (their mother, three sisters, younger brother, and two female cousins), while the house was prepared to be burned. Their father William Pearson, and brother Sidney were away from home at the time. The brothers Richard and Abraham Pearson were shot by a firing squad of about ten men, and the house was burned. Richard and Abraham Pearson died after six hours and fourteen hours, respectively.

The medical reports declare that the death of Richard Pearson was due to haemorrhage and shock caused by gunshot wounds to the left shoulder, right groin, right buttock, left lower leg and to the back; the most serious being the wound to the right groin. In the case of Abraham Pearson, death was declared to be the result of shock from gunshot wounds to the left cheek, left shoulder, left thigh, lower third of left leg and through the abdomen.

An appendix to the report of the British Military Court of Enquiry into the events states: "It is said by the C.I." [County Inspector of the Royal Irish Constabulary] "Queens County that the two Pearson boys a few days previously had seen two men felling a tree on their land adjoining the road. Had told the men concerned to go away, and when they refused had fetched two guns and fired and wounded two Sinn Feiners, one of whom it is believed died. It is further rumoured that when the farm house was burning, two guns fell out of the roof." The import of this information and non-inclusion in a controversial RTE television documentary was debated in the press in 2007.

== Atrocity claims ==
On 9 July 1921, the British Government in Dublin Castle issued a statement claiming that an atrocity had been committed against the Pearsons. Claims of murder and atrocity were made by William Stanley, "a loyalist fugitive and distant cousin of the Pearsons. He had been ordered out of Luggacurran in County Laois by the IRA" after allegedly becoming embroiled in a plot with the auxiliaries to arrest an IRA volunteer. He was living under an assumed name, "Jimmy Bradley", at the time of the roadblock incident and escaped by running away when the Pearson brothers were arrested.

Stanley's son, Alan Stanley, argued that the Pearsons were innocent farmers, that they did not shoot anybody at the roadblock, and that they were murdered by people who wanted to take their land. These claims have been challenged.

A controversial programme about the incident was broadcast by the Irish broadcaster RTÉ on 23 October 2007, giving rise to considerable discussion and debate. Complaints against the programme were rejected by the Broadcasting Complaints Commission. In addition to media discussion, the Aubane Historical Society complained to Taoiseach (Prime Minister) Bertie Ahern, RTÉ Director General Cathal Goan and RTÉ Director of Programmes, Claire Duignan.

Coolacrease: The True Story of the Pearson Executions was published in 2008 by the Aubane Historical Society and historians from Offaly. It was, amongst other things, critical of the RTÉ documentary. The book was reviewed by Steven King in the Sunday Business Post, November 2008, by Joost Augusteijn in History Ireland Magazine, (March/April 2009) and in Autumn 2009 by Tom Wall in the Dublin Review of Books, giving rise to further discussion.
