= This Way =

This Way may refer to:

== Albums ==
- This Way (Acoustic Alchemy album) or the title song, 2007
- This Way (Hana Pestle album) or the title song, 2009
- This Way (Jewel album) or the title song (see below), 2001
- This Way, by Bruce Gilbert, 1984
- This Way, by Total Touch with Trijntje Oosterhuis, 1998

== Songs ==
- "This Way" (Dilated Peoples song), 2004
- "This Way" (Jewel song), 2002
- "This Way", by Chris Brown from Heartbreak on a Full Moon, 2017
- "This Way", by Khalid and H.E.R. from the Superfly film soundtrack, 2018
- "This Way", by Madeline Kenney from Night Night at the First Landing, 2017
- "This Way", by Michelle Branch, 2009
- "This Way", by Mr. Scruff, 2009
- "This Way", by Psapp from The Only Thing I Ever Wanted, 2006
- "This Way (Too Many Times)", by Don Diablo from Life Is a Festival, 2008

== See also ==
- Thisway, an American indie pop band 1997–2003
- This Way Up (disambiguation)
- That Way (disambiguation)
