= The Way of Freedom =

The Way of Freedom may refer to:

- Der Weg einer Freiheit, German extreme metal band
- The Ways of Freedom, 1981 album by Sergey Kuryokhin

== See also ==
- The Way (disambiguation)
- Freedom (disambiguation)
