= The Way =

The Way may refer to:

== Religion ==
=== Christian ===
- A New Testament term referring to Christianity, e.g. in Acts 9:2
- "The Way", a term used for the Two by Twos church, also commonly known as "Cooneyites", "Meetings", "The Truth", or "Workers and Friends"
- Dokai (Japanese: 道会, "Society of The Way"), a Japanese Christian movement founded by Matsumura Kaiseki in 1907
- The Way of the Cross, a Catholic devotion to the Passion of Christ
- The Way of Madonna Della Strada
- The Way International, a Christian denomination founded by Victor Paul Wierwille in 1942

=== Non-Christian ===
- The Way, or "Tao", of Taoism
- The Way of the Buddha Dharma, or Buddhism
- The Way of Shinto

== Arts, entertainment, and media ==
=== Films ===
- The Way (2010 film), American film starring Martin Sheen and directed by Emilio Estevez
- The Way (2017 film), South-Korean film

=== Music ===
==== Groups ====
- The Way (Jesus music band), a Christian band of the early 1970s, part of the Jesus Movement
- The Way (punk rock band), an American Christian hardcore and Christian rock band founded 2010

==== Albums ====
- The Way (1973 album), 1973 album by The Way
- The Way (Steve Lacy album), a 1980 album by saxophonist Steve Lacy
- The Way (2009 album), 2009 album by Kellie Loder
- The Way (Buzzcocks album), 2014 album
- The Way (Macy Gray album), 2014 album

==== Songs ====
- "The Way" (Fastball song), 1998 song released by Fastball
- "The Way" (Jill Scott song), 2001 song released by Jill Scott
- "The Way" (Daniel Bedingfield song), 2005 single from Daniel Bedingfield
- "The Way" (Ariana Grande song), 2013 song by Ariana Grande
- "The Way (Juice Wrld and XXXTentacion song), 2025 single from Juice Wrld and XXXTentacion
- "The Way (Put Your Hand in My Hand)", 2003 single by Divine Inspiration
- "The Way/Solitaire", 2004 single by Clay Aiken
- "The Way", a song by CNBLUE from the album 392
- "The Way", song by Amorphis from the album Tuonela
- "The Way", song by Annihilator from the album For the Demented
- "The Way", song by Blues Traveler from the album Bridge
- "The Way", song by Bruce Springsteen from the album The Promise
- "The Way", song by Manchester Orchestra from the 2023 EP The Valley of Vision
- "The Way", song by Matchbox Twenty from the album North
- "The Way", song by Neil Young the album from Chrome Dreams II
- "The Way", song by Lynyrd Skynyrd the album from Vicious Cycle

=== Other arts, entertainment, and media ===
- The Way (Escrivá book), 1939 book on Catholic spirituality, written by Josemaría Escrivá de Balaguer
- The Way (Greg Bear), fictional universe concerning several novels by Greg Bear
- The Way (video game), a video game released in 2016
- The Way, a 1980 sculpture by Alexander Liberman
- The Way (TV series), a 2024 British TV series
- The Way, original title of The Path, an American drama web TV series (2016-2018)
- The Way (journal), a Jesuit spirituality journal founded in 1961.
- The Way (novel), a 1943 Japanese novella written by Taiwanese author Chen Huo-chuan

== Sports ==
- The Way (professional wrestling)

== See also ==
- The Two Ways in the Didache
- That Way (disambiguation)
- Way (disambiguation)
