= The Way (novel) =

Novella by Chen Huoquan

The Way (Chinese: 道) is a Japanese novella written by Taiwanese author Chen Huo-chuan (陳火泉). It falls under the genre of autobiographical fiction and was originally published in the July 1943 edition of Bungei Taiwan (文藝臺灣), Volume 6, Issue 3. The novella was later included in the December 1943 publication of the eponymous short story collection The Way. It stands as a representative work of imperial Subject Literature during the Japanese rule period in Taiwan. Discussions within the Taiwanese literary community about this work often center on the issue of Taiwanese identity as portrayed in the narrative.

== Plot ==
The plot follows the protagonist, a Taiwanese youth named Chen Ching-nan (陳青楠). During the implementation of the Japanization (Kominka) movement by the Taiwan Governor-General's Office, he grapples with the challenge of transforming himself from an unrecognized local into a true subject of the Emperor. His efforts to improve the distillation of camphor and increase production earn him recognition, but no promotion. He endures discrimination and meager treatment. He repeatedly argues that Taiwanese people can prove their Japanese identity through hard work. In the end, he realizes that he must join the ranks of volunteer soldiers and undergo the ritual sacrifice of his body to gain recognition as a Japanese person.

In 1943, when The Way was first published, Japanese writers in Taiwan, such as Hayao Hamada (濱田隼雄) and Mitsuru Nishikawa (西川滿), wrote articles praising it, considering it a "unique work of imperial Subject Literature" and a prototype for the literature of that time. The Way played a crucial role in establishing the significance of this literary genre. In the 1970s, with the rise of the studies of Taiwan literature, discussions about the literary and historical significance of The Way were reignited. In the 1990s and beyond, due to the exploration of the protagonist's promotion challenges within the Monopoly Bureau, some writers and scholars deemed the work as a form of protest literature, protesting against the colonial societal class structure, sparking further discussions.
