= Lung Ying-tsung =

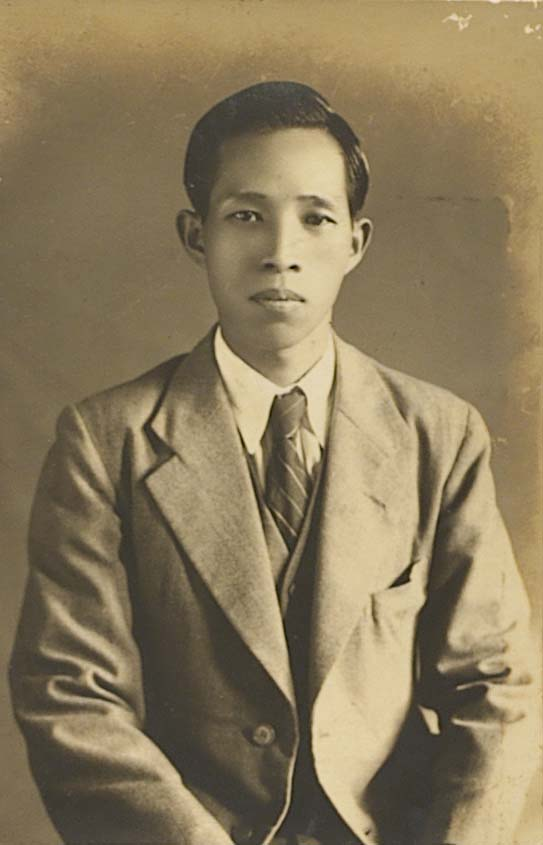
Portrait of Lung Ying-tsun.

Lung Ying-tsung (Chinese: 龍瑛宗; August 25, 1911 – September 26, 1999), real name Liu Jung-tsung (劉榮宗), was a Taiwanese novelist of Hakka descent hailing from Beipu, Hsinchu.

Lung Ying-tsung gained recognition after publishing his first Japanese-language novella, A Small Town Planted with Papaya Tree (植有木瓜樹的小鎮), in 1937. It received acclaim as the Honorable Mention Award in the novel competition held by the Japanese magazine Kaizō. He continued to make his mark in the literary community by publishing various types of works, including novels, new poetry, and critiques. Additionally, he established connections within the arts and culture community, joining organizations like the Cultural Capital (文藝首都) and the Taiwanese Writers' Association (臺灣文藝家協會). He also served as a member of the editorial board for publications such as Bungei Taiwan (文藝臺灣).

In 1980, Lung Ying-tsung overcame his language barriers and published his first Chinese-language novel, Du Fu in Chang'an (杜甫在長安), which once again captured the attention and acclaim of the literary world. Following this achievement, he went on to produce a substantial body of work in Chinese, including novels, essays, and critiques, with a total of over a hundred pieces. In 1985, he published the novel collection Cliffs in the Morning (午前的懸崖).

== Reception ==
Renowned Taiwanese writer Yeh Shih-tao praised him as "the most internationally acclaimed writer of the Japanese rule period". His works seamlessly blend elements of realism, naturalism, modernism, Japanese Shinkankaku-ha (New Sensation) style, and surrealism, transcending languages and eras to cultivate a uniquely aesthetic yet austere writing style.

Chou Fên-ling (周芬伶) explained Lung Ying-tsung's linguistic dilemma in the book The Biography of Lung Ying-tsun (龍瑛宗傳) as follows: "The transition of colonial identity and language, being a non-automatic or passive 'other,' forces one to undergo a dark period akin to death, and this period can be quite prolonged. Some manage to endure it and experience rebirth, while others who cannot endure it become 'remnants' of the previous era, which is another form of demise."
