= William Irvine (Scottish evangelist) =

Scottish evangelist (1863–1947)

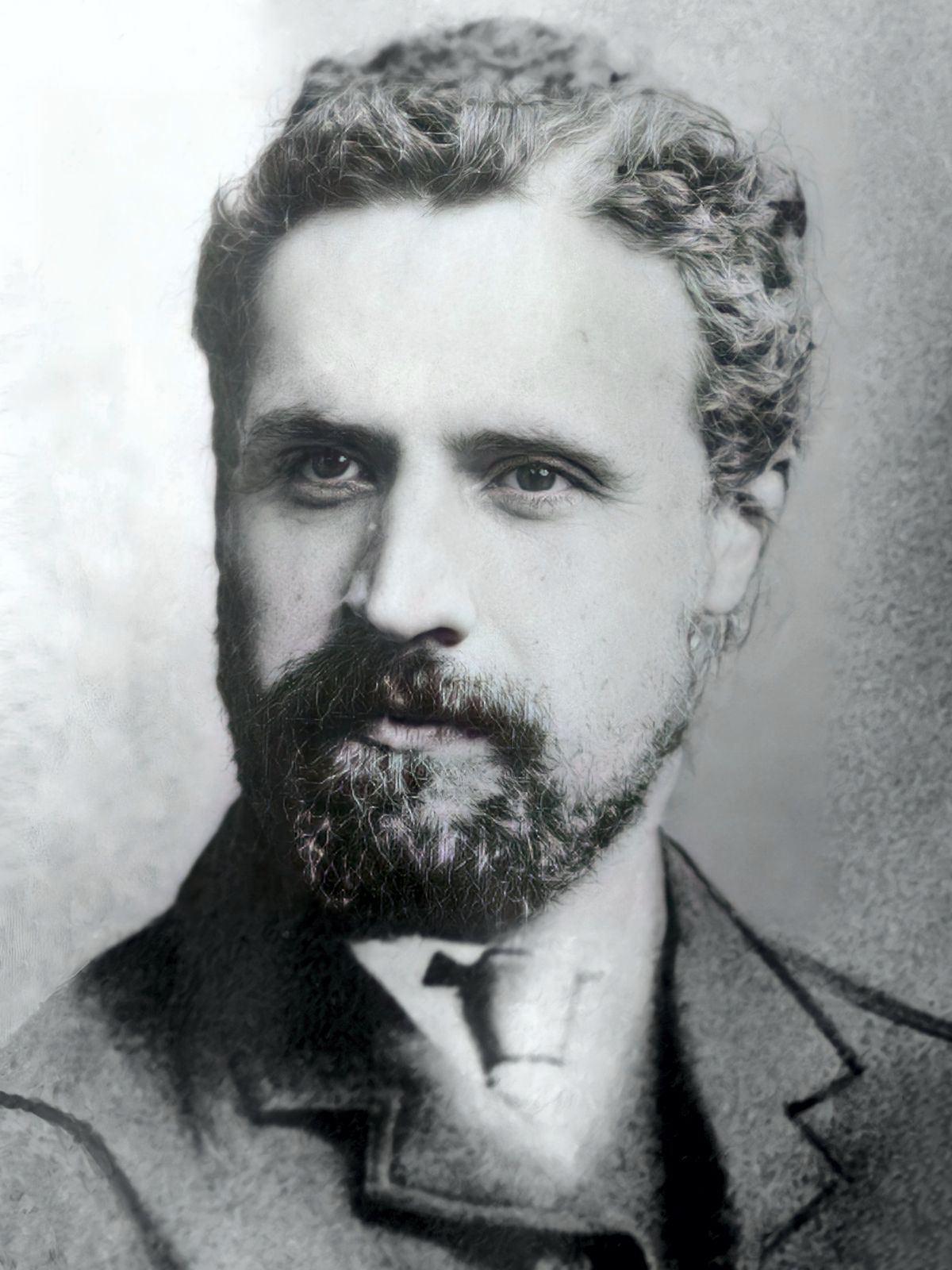
- William Irvine (circa 1910)
- Born: 7 January 1863; Kilsyth, Scotland
- Died: 9 March 1947 (aged 84); Jerusalem, Mandatory Palestine
- Resting place: Mt. Zion Protestant Cemetery, Jerusalem
- Occupation: Evangelist

Signature
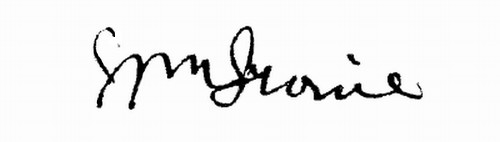

William Irvine (/ˈɜːrvɪn/; 7 January 1863 – 9 March 1947), sometimes Irvin or Irwin in contemporary documents, was a Scottish evangelist. He is regarded as the founder and early propagator of the Two by Twos movement. Rapid growth was experienced in its initial decades, and Irvine eventually came into conflict with the regional overseers whom he had appointed to administer the now worldwide religion. Irvine was excommunicated by the overseers in 1914 and eventually moved to Jerusalem, supported by loyalists who followed him out of the movement. He spent his remaining years writing apocalyptic and prophetic letters to his remaining followers around the world from Jerusalem, where he died in March 1947.

== Early life ==
Irvine was born in Kilsyth, located in North Lanarkshire, Scotland, the third of eleven children of a miner. The town of Kilsyth counts Irvine as one of its "famous sons". He was raised in the Presbyterian Free Church of Scotland. His education was at Kilsyth Academy and later worked as a quarry manager at a coal mine. After a conversion experience at a revival mission held by Moody evangelist John McNeill, Irvine left his position as General Manager of Baird's Bothwell Collieries in Lanarkshire and began two years studies at John Anderson's Bible Training Institute, Glasgow (1893–1895).

== Career ==
For convenience, William Irvine's career as an evangelist may be divided into 3 periods, though they would have been seen as a continuous stream with considerable overlap during those years.

=== Faith Mission ===
William Irvine joined the evangelical Faith Mission movement in Scotland in 1895. During the following year, he was sent to head the organization's missions in the south of Ireland and had enough success that he was named superintendent.

==== Personality ====
Irvine met John Long, a Methodist colporteur, in March 1897 in Kilrush, S. Ireland. "At this time, Irvine had a big reputation as a Faith Mission evangelist "remarkable for saying, 'Praise the Lord,' no matter what happened". John Long describes Irvine as "In either secular or religious matters, he was a born leader of men; he was a holy man, and practical. In personal dealing, he was preeminently the best conversationalist I ever met, and skilful in soul winning. He had a marvelous insight into the deep things of God's word, and like his Master, was an apt teacher of all who received the truth with pleasure. He always set forth the cross, and was a swift witness against all pride, vainglory and hypocrisy; he was severe on Christians, but merciful to sinners. In prayer, praise, and preaching he excelled in joy, liberty, and power. He was very much opposed and misunderstood by religious people; nevertheless, the common people liked him and heard him gladly." Other sources describe Irvine's style of speaking as hypnotic, "sweeter than honey in the honeycomb" and "ferocious" in its sincerity. He was also noted for making outrageous and inflammatory statements, even claiming "I am St. Paul the Second!"

==== New direction ====
Irvine quickly became dissatisfied with the Faith Mission's rules, disciplines, teachings, growing organization and tolerance of churches. During July 1897, Irvine was described as "repining over the spiritual laxity of the churches; and was spending much time in prayer for a revival". He began preaching a return to methods set forth in Matthew Chapter 10 during 1897, and began recruiting Faith Mission "workers" to his views. During this period, he became acquainted with the Carroll family who were involved with the Faith Mission work and who eventually followed him into the ministry. In August 1897, Irvine and John Long held meetings independent of Faith Mission, in Nenagh, County Tipperary, Ireland. Upwards of 30 who attended "got converted". These new followers renounced their former church ties and later gave up all they had and became workers in the new church, although no formal break with the Faith Mission occurred at that time.

During 1899, the first workers apart from Irvine were commissioned, and according to Irvine's reading of Matthew 10, they sold all, and became itinerant ministers. These were John Long, Alex Given, Tom Turner and George Walker. Although many within today's Two by Two church deny Irvine's role in originating the movement, the contemporary sources, including press coverage, statements from various workers, letters from Irvine himself, as well as modern scholarship, are in agreement in explicitly stating that Irvine was the new movement's founder. It is the only religion known to have started in Ireland.

=== Break with Faith Mission ===
Word that Irvine and others were "preaching along independent lines" reached the Faith Mission headquarters, and support was stopped for Irvine and eventually for those who were found to be participating in the new movement.

==== Alpha Gospel ====
Irvine's message, forcefully delivered, appealed primarily to young laborers and tradesmen. Initially the Protestant churches were supportive of Irvine and his revival crusade, but this soon changed. Irvine abhorred the ways in which he perceived that various churches made distinctions between the rich and the poor, and this became a frequent subject of his sermons. For the next 3 years, Irvine accepted Faith Mission funds, hospitality and facilities while he fleshed out the framework of his new movement. He wanted to get back to biblical basics and taught that all true ministers must follow Jesus' instructions to the apostles in Matthew 10; leaving their homes, families, property and responsibilities and going out to preach two-by-two. To a great degree, he copied the Faith Mission's methods and traditions; adopted their terminology; used their appearance standards for women evangelists; and appropriated many of their hymns. He believed he had restored God's "only true way".

==== Expansion ====
(l-r) William Gill (appointed overseer of Britain), William Irvine with pet dog and constant companion, and George Walker (appointed overseer of eastern North America), early workers

During the years immediately following 1900, an increasing number of new "workers" left their former churches. These included a few who began breaking with their Faith Mission affiliation, and the support they had been receiving from that organization (the dates each of the early "workers" began their ministry are preserved in the 1905 "List of Workers"). Although he had ceased preaching inside the Faith Mission framework or reporting to its headquarters for some time, Irvine himself formally resigned from that organization only in 1901. Other "workers" who had stayed affiliated with the Faith Mission followed (including John Kelly). Edward Cooney also joined in 1901, selling all and donating the considerable sum of £1,300 to Irvine (a working family could live comfortably on an annual income of £57–78 during this time).

With the ranks of the ministry swelling, the outreach also expanded quickly. In 1903, the first of the annual "conventions" was held in Ireland. Later that year, William Irvine, accompanied by Irvine Weir and George Walker, became the first "workers" to set foot in North America.

==== Development ====
In 1904, a two-tiered system was instituted, whereby a distinction was made between homeless itinerant missionaries (called "workers"), and those who were now allowed to retain homes and jobs (called "friends" or "saints"). Weekly home meetings began to be held, presided over by "elders" (usually the "professing" householder). The group grew rapidly, and held regular annual conventions lasting several weeks at a time. Irvine travelled widely during this period, attending conventions and preaching worldwide, and began sending forth workers from the British Isles to follow up and expand these footholds.

A controversial teaching, presumably originating with Irvine, was that of the Living Witness Doctrine (first recorded mention in a convention sermon by Joseph Kerr in 1905, which he later recanted after leaving the group). According to this precept, faith and salvation could only come about through hearing the word preached from the lips of, and seeing the gospel lived in the sacrificial lives of, the true ministry (the "Living Witness"). As a consequence of this doctrine, some were expelled over the following years (among whom was Irvine's early companion, John Long). 1906 found Irvine in San Francisco during the great earthquake.

The first "workers" in various regions began to coordinate the activities of the ministry within their geographical areas. They eventually were looked to as the "Overseers" or "Head Workers" in charge of those spheres. However, Irvine continued to have the ultimate say over both their conduct and finances. This eventually, and naturally, led to growing friction and they began to regard his activities as "interference."

=== Omega Message ===
In the few years just prior to the First World War, an increased emphasis on eschatology was noticed. This has been later cited as one of the contributing factors towards the first division in the young denomination. He preached that the Age of Grace, during which his "Alpha Gospel" had been proclaimed, was coming to a close. As his message turned towards themes of a new era which held no place for the ministry and hierarchy which had rapidly grown up around the "Alpha Gospel," resentments on the part of several Overseers came to a head.

==== Schism ====
All this led to a division in the church over the period 1914–1918. Various leading workers did not accept new developments in Irvine's revelation, and although most accepted that in the beginning Irvine had received a genuine revelation from God in his "Alpha Gospel", they did not accept his "Omega Message". These overseers rebelled against what they saw as Irvine's increasingly autocratic leadership in 1914, and they refused to give him opportunity to speak at conventions held within their respective geographic regions. Hundreds of Irvine's followers were excommunicated, and his name was seldom mentioned from that time onwards. By 1918, the parting of the ways had become irreversible and, despite an overture to tempt Irvine to rejoin in a lesser capacity subservient to conditions imposed by the overseers, the break was finalized in 1924 with Irvine being excommunicated from the main group.

The greater majority of church members remained under the overseers who followed Irvine's "Alpha" revelation. Few were aware of the circumstances of his departure, and no public discussion of the matter seems to have occurred, although rumors of a "mental breakdown" or "indiscretions with women" were spread (the latter may have arisen out of his having fathered a son out of wedlock as a young man prior to his start in ministry). Irvinite loyalists continued to support and be guided by Irvine. Unlike those who continued to follow only his "Alpha Gospel", these refused to adopt any official name, although they came to be known among themselves as the "Message People" or "The Witnesses".

==== To Jerusalem ====
Photograph of William Irvine taken during the 1930s

Irvine spent many of the World War I years in America. During this time, he again visited with Pentecostals in Los Angeles, and reportedly experienced the gift of tongues and of interpreting tongues. He returned to his family in Kilsyth, Scotland around September 1919, and moved permanently to Palestine in November that year.

Although Irvine had become isolated from the general membership of the larger sect, which continued to follow his "Alpha Gospel", many among its leadership continued to maintain contact with him, even making the pilgrimage to Jerusalem to visit with him. During the controversy leading up to the schism between the overseers and Edward Cooney in 1928, Irvine was asked to intervene to settle the dispute, although he limited his involvement to advising Cooney to return to Ireland.

==== The Message ====
Irvine believed that a final "Age of Grace", for which his "Alpha Gospel" had been intended to proclaim, had come to an end in August 1914, and that he had been chosen by God to bring a last message of Jesus Christ to the world before the final judgement (the "Omega Message"). He claimed to be the divinely appointed and foretold prophet and Reader of the Book of Revelation. As part of that role, he would eventually become one of (along with the Apostle John) the Two witnesses of Revelation ch.11 who would have special powers to prophesy and perform miracles, and would be killed in Jerusalem and raised up after 3½ days and taken up to heaven in a cloud prior to the return of Christ. He prophesied that there would be a coming great famine, and encouraged his followers to sell their homes and farms and invest their money in food and other provisions that would enable them to survive this impending calamity.

During the remainder of his life, William Irvine continued to develop this theology, which he transmitted to his followers in a continuing series of letters. These letters were reproduced by trusted members and distributed among the followers. Collections of these letters were bound together and saved for further study by the membership. His followers believe that the true meaning of the Bible and prophecy are unlocked by studying Irvine's reading of the scriptures.

== Death ==
William Irvine died in Jerusalem on 9 March 1947 at age 84 from throat cancer. He was buried in Zion Cemetery, Jerusalem. The precise location within the cemetery was unknown for many years, as any marker was obliterated when the area became a no-man's land between Jordan and Israel between 1948 and 1967. In recent years, the site has been restored, and Irvine's resting place is now marked with a headstone. It is not completely clear how followers of Irvine's "Omega Message" rationalised the facts of his death with the roles which he seems to play in his prophecies. However, his role in the years after 1914 seems to have been as the "Reader of Revelation", and members seem to be awaiting his return to fulfill other predictions.

Irvine's death went largely unnoticed by the larger (Two by Twos) branch of the movement, most of whom either had no or only vague knowledge of the movement's founder. They had also, after the split of 1914–18, sought to diminish the role of William Irvine's involvement in the church group. Following Irvine's excommunication, leading workers agreed to "bury the past" and move forward.

William Irvine was survived by his sisters in Scotland, and by a son Archibald Irvine (died 1952).

== Legacy ==
At the time of the schism, Irvine believed that all those who died in "The Testimony" prior to 3 August 1914 were saved, but that only those who followed his continuing message could be saved. Ironically, both the workers and Irvine firmly believed they had God's only true message on earth at that time, so now there were two "only right way" methods on earth, both of which arose from Irvine's revelations.

The larger branch of the church he founded (known variously as "The Truth", "Christian Conventions" or "Two-by-Twos") continues today. Because records are not kept, membership estimates range from about 75,000 to half a million worldwide. In addition, there are groups of both the Cooneyites sect and of Irvine-loyalist Message People (also sometimes called The Man and Message) which continue, although it is speculated that neither of the latter has experienced any growth recently.

== See also ==
- Two by Twos
- Edward Cooney
