= Two by Twos =

International Christian movement

The Truth, Two by Twos
- Prominent early Two by Twos preachers. Left to right: William Gill, William Irvine, George Walker.
- Classification: New Religious Movement; Nontrinitarian
- Polity: Episcopal
- Region: Worldwide
- Founder: William Irvine
- Origin: October 1897 (129 years ago); Ireland
- Separations: The Message; Cooneyites
- Members: 300000–370000 (1990–1998); 1–4 million (1964–1984) (Note: The church does not publish any membership statistics; outside researchers give a wide range of estimates. In part, this depends on who is included as a member (children of members, unbaptized participants, lapsed members, etc) and whether the metric estimates are based upon known numbers of annual conventions, numbers of ministers, etc. One researcher has said that people on the fringes of church membership can be up to twenty times the number of regular members.(Hosfeld & 17 August 1983, pp. 1–2) During the 1980s, The Sydney Morning Herald gave an estimate of between 1 and 4 million members worldwide,(Gill & 30 June 1984, p. 37) while a 2001 estimate put Australian membership at 70,000.(Giles & 25 July 2001, p. 014) A sociology masters thesis from 1964 estimated U.S. membership at 300,000 to 500,000 and world membership as between 1 and 2 million.(Crow 1964, pp. 2, 16) Benton Johnson updated the metrics to arrive at a figure of 48,000 to 190,000 for the United States alone.(Johnson 1995, pp. 43–44) George Chryssides states that membership numbers are uncertain, giving an estimate for the United States during 1998 as ranging from 10,000 to 100,000 and a worldwide membership probably three times that figure.(Chryssides 2001b, pp. 330–331) The World Christian Encyclopedia shows the group in the United States growing from 100,000 in 1970 to 270,000 in 1990, while during the same period, Australian membership declined from 150,000 to 100,000.(Barrett, Kurian & Johnson 2001, pp. 85, 785) A 2022 source cited a worldwide decline of 38% in the number of ministers and up to a 40% decline in members since 1980.(Kropp-Ehrig 2022, p. 497) Figures from other sources fall within this same wide range.)
- Tax status: unknown
- Other names: The Truth; The Way; Workers and Friends; Christian Conventions; Cooneyites; Assemblies of Christians; The Meetings; The Friends; The Brethren; 2x2; and additional

Two by Twos (also known as 2x2, The Truth and The Way) is an international, home-based Christian new religious movement that was founded in 1897 in Ireland by William Irvine. Irvine, an evangelist with the interdenominational Faith Mission, began independently preaching that the itinerant ministry outlined in Matthew 10 remains the only valid method of evangelism. Church growth was rapid, spreading outside Ireland. Irvine eventually began preaching a new order in which the hierarchy developed within the church would have no placement. This teaching became controversial within the church, leading to his expulsion by church overseers around 1914. One of the church's most prominent evangelists, Edward Cooney, was expelled a decade after Irvine. The church then became much less visible to outsiders for the next half-century. The publication of several articles and books, increased news coverage, and the appearance of the Internet have since opened the church to wider scrutiny. Increased scrutiny by news organizations has focused on various wrongdoings, and the United States FBI launched an on-going investigation into allegations of childhood sexual abuse and other potential irregularities.

Some in the church assert it is a direct continuation of the 1st-century Christian church. Others in the church believe that a restoration occurred in the late 19th century. Ministers are itinerant and work in pairs, hence the name "Two by Twos". Members hold regular twice-weekly worship gatherings in local homes on Sunday and midweek. The church also holds annual regional conventions for members and public Gospel meetings. Baptism by immersion, as performed by one of the church's workers, is required to partake in the emblems of bread and wine at the fellowship gathering. The orthodox Christian Trinitarian doctrine is rejected. Doctrine of the church teaches that salvation is reached by attending the group's home meetings, accepting the preaching of its itinerant, unsalaried ministry workers, and "professing". The church teaches that salvation is not achieved through faith alone but only through a combination of faith and "works". Works are considered acts of self-denial such as wearing modest skirts and long hair in a bun or attending all meetings regardless of how far away they are. The church does not do any outreach programs or encourage its members to participate in charities.

The church does not have official headquarters or publications. It does not explicitly publish any doctrinal statements, insisting that such tenets may only be directly imparted orally by its ministers, referred to as "workers". Its hymnbook and various other materials for internal use are produced by outside publishers and printing firms. Printed invitations and advertisements for its open gospel services are the only written materials that those outside the church are likely to encounter.

Among members, the church is usually referred to as "The Truth", "Meetings", or "the workers and friends", but members deny an official church name. Those outside the church refer to it as "Two by Twos", "The Black Stockings", "No-name Church", "Cooneyites", "Workers and Friends", or "Christians Anonymous", and journalists sometimes call it "2x2" for short. The church's various registered names include "Christian Conventions" in the United States, "Assemblies of Christians" and "The Alberta Society of Christian Assemblies" in Canada (dissolved only after it was exposed), "The Testimony of Jesus" in the United Kingdom, "Kristna i Sverige" in Sweden, and "United Christian Conventions" in Australia. These registered names are used only for specific purposes (for instance, to register conscientious objection during war) and are not routinely used by members.

== History ==
=== Founding ===
In 1896, William Irvine was sent from Scotland to southern Ireland as a missionary by John George Govan's Faith Mission, an interdenominational organization with roots in the Holiness movement. Because his mission was successful, he was promoted to superintendent of Faith Mission in southern Ireland.

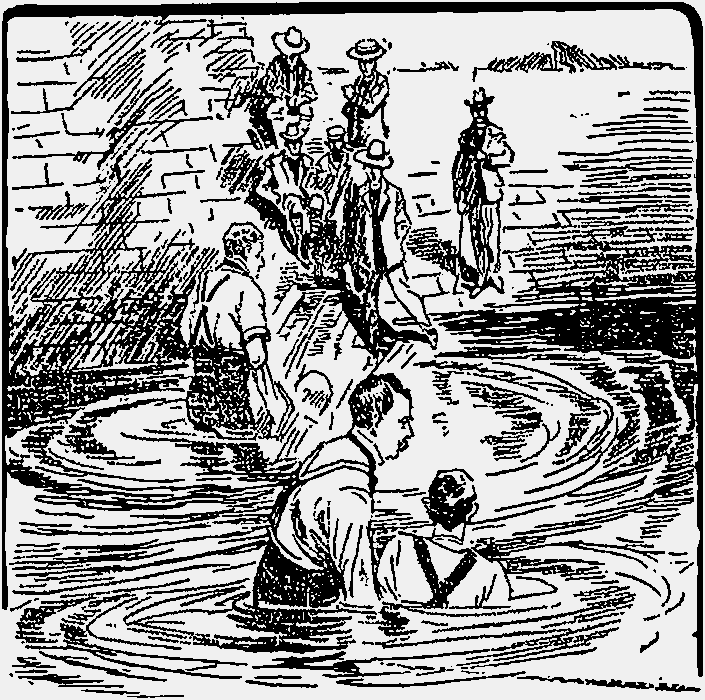
A drawing from 1907 depicting a baptismal rite. Its caption reads "How 'Dippers' are Initiated".

Within a few months of his arrival in Ireland, Irvine was already disillusioned with the Faith Mission. There was friction over its Holiness teachings, and Irvine saw its organization as a violation of his concept of a faith-based ministry. Above all, Irvine was increasingly intolerant of the Faith Mission's cooperation with the other churches and clergy in the various communities of southern Ireland, regarding converts who joined churches as "lost among the clergy". In 1897, he began preaching independently, proclaiming that true ministers must have no home and take no salary. He became convinced that he had received this as a special revelation he referred to as his "Alpha message". Opposed to all other established churches, he held that the manner in which the disciples had been sent out in chapter 10 of the Gospel of Matthew was a permanent commandment which must still be observed. The passage reads in part:

These twelve Jesus sent forth, and commanded them, saying, Go not into the way of the Gentiles, and into any city of the Samaritans enter ye not: But go rather to the lost sheep of the house of Israel. And as ye go, preach, saying, The kingdom of heaven is at hand. Heal the sick, cleanse the lepers, raise the dead, cast out devils: freely ye have received, freely give. Provide neither gold, nor silver, nor brass in your purses, Nor scrip for your journey, neither two coats, neither shoes, nor yet staves: for the workman is worthy of his meat.

In October 1897, Irvine was invited by Nenagh businessman John "Jack" Carroll to preach in the Carrolls' hometown of Rathmolyon. There he held a series of mission meetings in which all established churches were rejected, and Irvine's new doctrine and method of ministry were set forth. It was in Rathmolyon that he recruited the first adherents to his new message. Aside from condemning all other churches, Irvine's doctrine included the rejection of church buildings, damnation of all followers of churches outside the new fellowship, rejection of paid ministry, rejection of collections (Note: Collection refers to the donation money collected from a church congregation during a service, normally by means of a collection plate or box.) during services and collection boxes, and the requirement that those seeking to join the ministry "sell all".

Irvine's preaching during this latest mission influenced others who began to leave their respective churches and join Irvine to form an initial core of followers. Some of these early adherents would become important members of the new church, including John Long, (Note: John Long (1872–1962) traced his conversion experience to a mission held by Methodist evangelist Gabriel Clarke in 1890. He became a colporteur for the Methodists in Ireland, where he encountered William Irvine. He eventually joined Irvine's workers, until publicly expelled in 1907 for disagreeing with the group's exclusivist position (Robinson 2005, p. 36). Long returned to his work as a colporteur (Lennie 2009, p. 426) and joined the Elim evangelists for a time. From there he went on to become a noted Pentecostal preacher in Ireland, Scotland, Wales and England (Robinson 2005, p. 36). The editor of Heresies Exposed included a correction by Long of the name of the church's original leader and the year of its founding in 1897 (Irvine 1929, p. 73(fn)). He also left his memoirs (in journal form, though redacted many years later) (Long 1927).) the Carroll family, John Kelly, Edward Cooney—an influential evangelist from the Church of Ireland—and George Walker (an employee of the Cooney family's fabric business), all of whom eventually "sold all" and joined the new movement as itinerant preachers. Although other movements, such as the Plymouth Brethren and Elim have had strong Irish connections, the church founded by Irvine is the only religion known to have had its origin and early development in Ireland.

=== Early growth ===
Extract of an article from The Impartial Reporter and Farmers' Journal from 1910 documenting the early phases of the church. See endnote for link to the full article. (Note: To view the complete 1910 article shown above, see here.)

Unlike later secretiveness, initially, the church was in the public eye, with questions about it being raised in Parliament beginning in 1900. Inspired by speakers such as Irvine and Cooney, membership growth was rapid. Rather than adding members to established denominations, as was the practice of the Faith Mission outreach, churches began noticing their congregations thinning after exposure to the Two by Two missions. Clerics soon began regarding the Two by Two preachers as "inimical to the membership of the church". After receiving reports from Ireland, the Faith Mission in 1900 formally disassociated itself from Irvine and any of its workers found to be participating in the new Two by Two movement.

The attention of Belfast newspapers was initially drawn to the Two by Twos church because of its open-air baptismal rites. At that time, the baptisms took place in public settings such as streams, lakes, or the sea, even in cold weather. Regarded as a novelty, the outdoor "dippings" and accompanying sermons attracted large crowds. Further attention was given during the staging of large marches through boroughs and public preaching in town squares and on street corners.

Workers, including Edward Cooney and George Walker, publicly preached that all members of other churches were damned. They singled out prominent individuals, and even entire communities, for condemnation. At times, missions were sited close to the meeting places of other denominations, which were denounced using "extreme language". Consequences of these inflammatory remarks ranged from heckling and street violence to the break-up of families, all of which brought further attention to the church. Newspapers in Ireland, Britain, and North America followed the disturbances that arose over the church's activities and message. Some hosted debates in their editorial columns. One member of Parliament offered to join the Two by Twos if they would cease criticizing other religious bodies.

As the ranks of its ministry increased, the church's outreach expanded. Large gatherings were held in Dublin, Glasgow and Belfast during 1899. Annual conventions, modeled after the evangelical Keswick Conventions in England, began to be held regularly in Ireland starting in 1903. Later that year, William Irvine, accompanied by Irvine Weir and George Walker, took his message to North America. (Note: The immigration record shows Irvine, Walker and Weir stating that they were joining a relative, "George McGregor" living at Coffey Street in Brooklyn New York (R.I.S. 2009a).) Missions to continental Europe, Australia, and Asia followed.

By 1904, the requirement to "sell all" was no longer mentioned in sermons. A two-tiered system was instituted that made a distinction between homeless itinerant missionaries (called "workers") and those who were now allowed to retain homes and jobs (called "friends" or "saints"). Weekly home meetings began to be held and presided over by "elders", who were typically the householder. During the next few years, this change became universal. The church continued to grow rapidly and held regular annual conventions lasting several weeks at a time. Irvine traveled widely during this period, attending conventions and preaching worldwide, and began sending workers from the British Isles to follow up and expand interest in various areas.

Beginning in 1906, unwelcome attention came in the form of leaflets and billboard notices. W. D. Wilson, an English farmer whose unmarried children had left home and joined the Two by Twos, began publishing articles stating girls were being recruited by the church for immoral purposes. In response, Edward Cooney brought a widely publicized suit for libel that was resolved by a settlement between the parties by the end of 1913.

A hierarchy was instituted by Irvine, and his most trusted associates in various regions were designated as "overseers" or "head workers". Each worker was assigned a particular geographical sphere and then coordinated the efforts of the ministry within his area. Among the overseers were William and Jack Carroll, George Walker, and Willie Gill. Irvine continued to have the ultimate say over worker conduct and finances, and his activities within their fields became regarded as "interference". Except for such annual conventions as he was able to attend across the globe, communications and instructions from Irvine passed through the overseers.

=== Schism ===
William Irvine's progressive revelation continued to evolve over this time, and eschatological themes began to appear in sermons. (Note: "As early as 1912, Irvine was exercising his charismatic imagination in ways that must have been unsettling to those in the movement with an interest in routinization. In that year he told conventions that it might be possible to travel to the stars and act as saviours to them as Jesus acted for us. He spoke of Christ's imminent return and referred to his movement as the 144,000 mentioned in the Book of Revelation." —Benton Johnson (Johnson 1995, p. 50).) By 1914, he had begun to preach that the Age of Grace, during which his "Alpha Gospel" had been proclaimed, was coming to a close. As his message turned towards indicating a new era, which held no place for the ministry and hierarchy that had rapidly grown up around the "Alpha Gospel", resentment arose on the part of overseers who saw him as a threat to their positions.

Australian overseer John Hardie was the first to break with Irvine and excluded him from speaking at the South Australia convention in late 1913. As 1914 progressed, he was excluded from speaking in a growing number of regions, as more overseers broke away from him. Rumors circulated about Irvine's comfortable lifestyle and supposed weakness for women, though nothing concrete was ever exposed. It was put about that Irvine "had lost the Lord's anointing" in an effort to explain his ouster. He was shunned and his name was no longer mentioned, making him a nonperson in the church he founded. There were many excommunications of Irvine loyalists in various fields during the following years, and by 1919, the split was final, with Irvine moving to Jerusalem and transmitting his "Omega Message" to his core followers from there. Lacking any organizational means of making his case before the membership, Irvine's ouster occurred quietly. Most members continued following the overseers, and few outside the leadership knew the details behind Irvine's disappearance from the scene, as no public mention of the split seems to have been made. Mention of Irvine's name was forbidden, and a new explanation of the group's history was introduced from which Irvine's role was erased. (Note: "The workers declared that Irvine 'had lost the Lord's anointing' and banned him from all assemblies. But they also had to devise a new source of authority for the movement's very special brand of Christianity. They did this by an ingenious falsification of their own history, in which Irvine's role was obliterated. And armed with this new history and the unity to enforce a ban on Irvine, the workers declared that the founder's name was not to be mentioned within the movement. He was excised from the shared memory of the organization he had founded." —Johnson in Klass and Weisgrau (Johnson 1999, p. 378).)

Although the threat posed by Irvine to the church's organization had been dealt with, the prominent worker Edward Cooney refused to place his evangelistic efforts under the control of the overseers. Cooney himself adhered to the earlier, unfettered style of itinerant ministry, moving about wherever he felt he was needed. He rejected the appointment of head workers to geographic regions and criticized their lifestyles. He also preached against the "Living Witness" doctrine (i.e., that salvation entails hearing the gospel preached directly by a worker and seeing the gospel made alive in the sacrificial lives of the ministry), the bank accounts controlled by the overseers, use of halls for meetings, conventions, the hierarchy that had developed, and the ministry and the registrations under official names. For a time, his message urging a return to the original principles of Matthew 10 gained a following, even among some Australian overseers.

A second division occurred in 1928 when Edward Cooney was expelled for criticizing the hierarchy and other elements that had arisen within the church, which he saw as serious deviations from the church's original message. The overseers seized upon a failed attempt at performing a faith healing as a pretext to excommunicate him. Cooney's loyal supporters joined him, including some of the early workers, and they stayed faithful to what they perceived to be the original tenets. The term "Cooneyite" today chiefly refers to the group which separated (or were excommunicated) along with Cooney and who continue as an independent group. Prior to the schism, onlookers had labeled the entire movement as "Cooneyites" due to Edward Cooney's prominence in the early growth of the church. There are areas where this older usage continues.

=== Consolidation ===
These schisms were not widely publicized, and few were aware that they had occurred. Most supporters of Irvine, and later Cooney, were either coaxed into abandoning those loyalties or put out of the fellowship. Among these were the early workers May Carroll, Irvine Weir (one of the first workers in North America, who was excommunicated for continued contact with Cooney and for his objection to registration of the church under names), and Tom Elliot (who had conducted baptisms of the first workers and was nicknamed "Tom the Baptist").

The emergence of the Two by Twos caused severe splits within local Protestant churches in Ireland at a time of increasing demands for Irish independence, largely driven by the Catholic majority community. Because of animosity, the Two by Twos did not form a united front with other Protestant communities. Although the church was noted for extreme anti-Catholic views, it played a very minor role during the struggle for Irish independence. One exception was the involvement of the Pearson family in the still-controversial killings at Coolacrease.

In the mid-1920s, a magazine article entitled "The Cooneyites or Go-Preachers" disturbed the leadership, who made efforts to have it withdrawn, particularly when material from the article was added to the widely distributed reference Heresies Exposed. During this period, the church modified its evangelical outreach. The public preaching of its early days was replaced with low-key "gospel meetings", which were attended only by members and invitees. The church began to state that it had a 1st-century origin. It asserted that it had no organization or name and disclaimed any unique doctrines. The church shunned publicity, making the church very difficult for outsiders to follow.

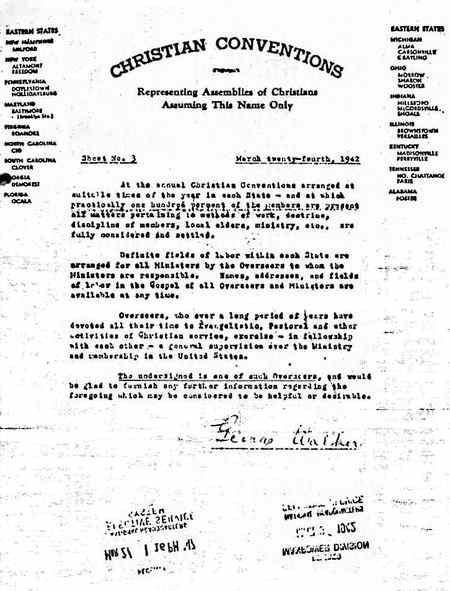
Last page of senior overseer George Walker's statement to the U.S. Selective Service in 1942 under the name "Christian Conventions" (Note: For full text of the letter, see The Secret Sect (Parker & Parker 1982, pp. 117–119).)

The North American church saw a struggle for influence between overseers George Walker in the east and Jack Carroll in the west. In 1928, an agreement was forged between the senior overseers that limited workers operating outside of their appointed geographical spheres, known as "fields": workers traveling into an area controlled by another overseer had to first submit their revelation to, and obtain permission from, the local overseer. The exact boundaries between fields was worked out over time, and there were areas where workers under the control of more than one overseer operated, causing conflict.

During the First World War, the church obtained exemption from military service in Britain under the name "The Testimony of Jesus". However, there were problems with recognition of this name outside the British Isles, and exemption was refused in many other areas. In New Zealand during World War I, members of the church could not prove their conscientious objector status, and formed the largest segment of those imprisoned for refusal to serve. Members and ministers also had difficulty establishing their conscientious objector status in the United States during the First World War. With the start of the Second World War, formal names were adopted and used in registering the church with various national governments. (Note: This is the subject of letters from Rittenhouse and Sweetland, given in full in Reinventing the Truth (Daniel 1993, pp. 281, 283–284).) These names continued to be used for official business, and stationery bearing those names was printed for the use of overseers. Most members were not aware of these names. Some who dissented after learning of the practice were expelled by the workers.

After the death of Australian overseer William Carroll in 1953, an attempt was made to reintegrate the repudiated adherents of William Irvine and Edward Cooney. Rather than producing further unity, the attempt produced conflicts over the church's history which was exposed, the existence of legal names, disagreements over the hierarchy which had developed, and other controversies. Many excommunications took place in the subsequent effort to enforce harmony.

The earliest workers and overseers were succeeded by a new generation of leaders. In Europe, William Irvine died in 1947, Edward Cooney died in 1960, and John Long (expelled in 1907) died in 1962. British overseer Willie Gill died in 1951. In the South Pacific, New Zealand overseer Wilson McClung died in 1944, and Australian overseer John Hardie died in 1961. In North America, both Jack Carroll, the Western overseer, and Irvine Weir died in 1957 while Eastern overseer George Walker died in 1981.

Its policy of not revealing its name, finances, doctrine, or history, (Note: "In very short order they also destroyed Irvine's earlier stature as a charismatic innovator by explaining that the sect he had founded was actually a collective rediscovery of the earliest form of Christianity, which had existed as small persecuted bands since the first century." —Benton Johnson (Johnson 1995, p. 50).) and avoidance of publicity (Note: "The Cooneyites, also called the Two-by-Two's, have developed the shunning of publicity into a fine art." —Melton (Melton 2009, p. 554).) largely kept the church from public notice. The sect has been labeled a "high-control group" by some, while former members and others have referred to the group as a "cult". A few authors of popular literature have noted the church, using it as a background for various works.

=== Into the 21st century ===
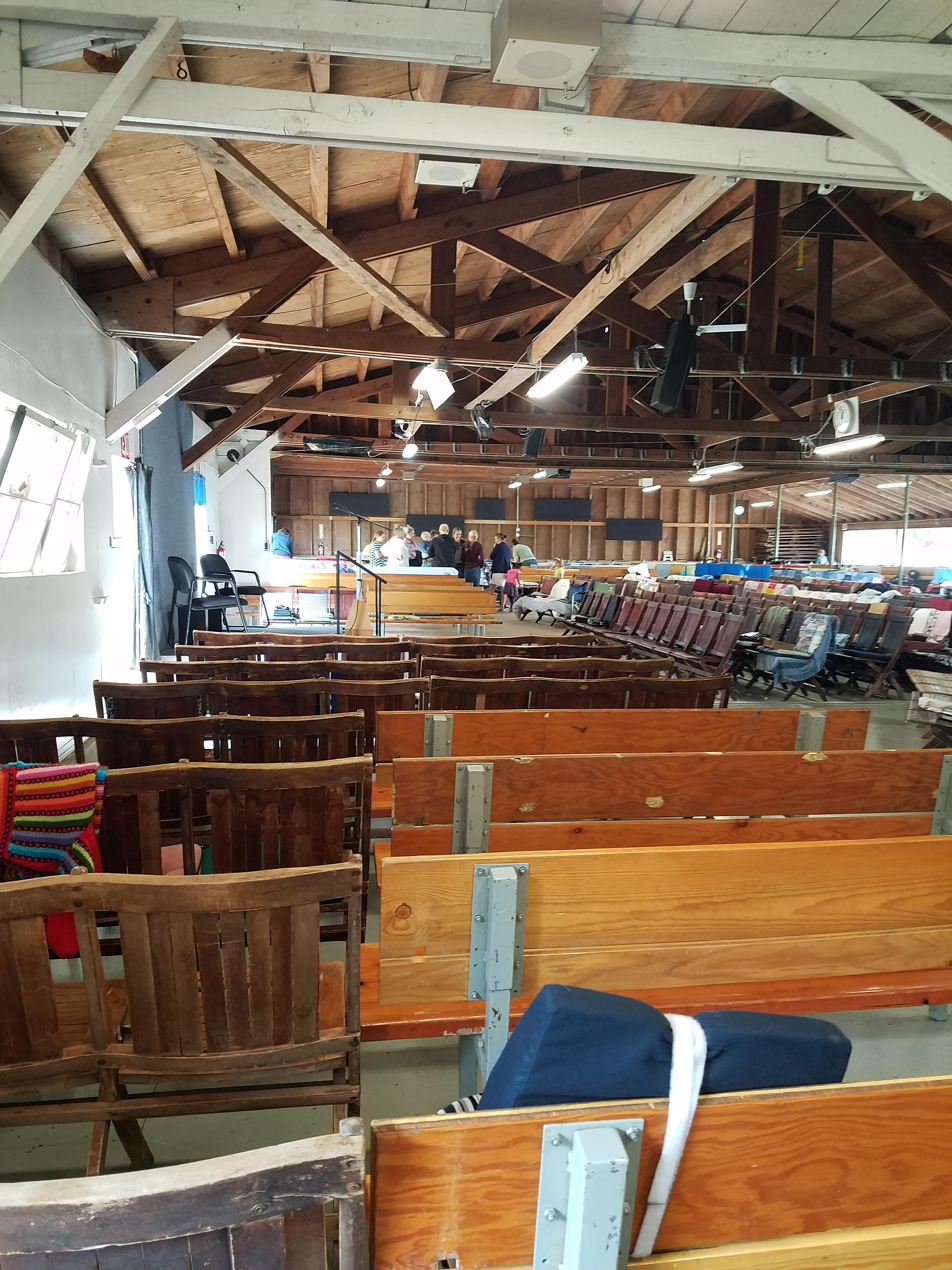
Two by Two convention hall in Saginaw, Oregon, in 2018

Divisions, both doctrinal and organizational, within the group have formed throughout its history and continue as ongoing challenges.

Until the mid 1980s, notes regarding the Two by Twos had appeared infrequently in religious journals and sociological works, with some writers assuming that the church had greatly declined, with nothing published regarding it. In 1982, the publication of The Secret Sect was followed by press reports and public statements by former members. Other books and news coverage dealing with the church appeared in the following decades and increased awareness of the church and its practices. With the exposure of regional differences and the appearance of dissent, a loosening of a few strict standards demanded of members has been observed in some areas. A marked decline in membership has occurred over recent decades, coinciding with availability of information on the Internet and elsewhere.

=== Abuse cases ===
In April 2019, the Australian current affairs television show 60 Minutes interviewed child sex abuse victims of Australian ministers.

On 20 March 2023, a letter from overseer Doyle S. Smith (the "Dean Letter") informed some members of the discovery of predatory and sexually abusive behavior by the deceased worker and overseer Dean Bruer. Since the release of the Dean Letter, other allegations of sexual abuse and child sexual abuse taking place within the church have been reported from all over the world. Former minister Robert Corfield admitted that he had sexually abused a boy in Saskatchewan, Canada, over several years in the 1980s. The number of perpetrators have been estimated to be in the hundreds, with several thousand victims identified. In the United States, the Federal Bureau of Investigation (FBI) opened an investigation in 2024.

In 2023, the Two by Twos' Australasian overseers had issued two letters to members acknowledging incidents of abuse overseas, condemning child abuse and encouraging victims to report abuse to the police. The overseers also announced they would establish an anonymous advisory group to develop child-safe policies and manage the group's response to historical child sexual abuse. In other areas, calls for adoption of an official policy have been rejected or ignored. In May 2024, the group's Australasian leaders launched a website with information about their response to historical child sexual abuse and a written apology to victims. Former abuse victims and victim advocate Jillian Hishon have criticized the group's response for lacking impartiality and accountability.

In June 2024, the American Broadcasting Company television news program Nightline aired a segment on child sexual abuse cases across the United States. An expanded report aired concurrently on season 2 of the Hulu docuseries Impact X Nightline.

In September 2024, Radio New Zealand reported that New Zealand Police were assisting the FBI investigation by investigating at least one former New Zealand minister for historical abuse. A former minister William Stephen Easton admitted 55 child sex abuse charges over three decades against young boys. The church has about 2,500 members and 60 ministers in New Zealand. Peter Lineham of Massey University has been researching the group since the 1970s and said that it had been active in New Zealand for 120 years.

An American former elder of the church, Raymond Zwiefelhofer, was sentenced to 120 years in prison in November, 2024, for 10 counts of possessing child sexual abuse material. (Note: An ABC News report stated: "'In total, there were 87 files that were determined to be child sexual abuse material or sometimes known as child pornography,' Catherine Fu, a Maricopa Deputy County Attorney, told ABC News. 'The 10 charged files were a combination of photos and videos, and they were all depicting children under the age of 15 engaged in either exploitive exhibition or sexual conduct.' Zwiefelhofer, 61, maintains his innocence."(ABC 2024b).)

A report published by the BBC in early 2025 covered allegations of women who were pressured into giving up their children for adoption.

== Doctrine ==
Apart from their hymnals, officially published documentation or church statements are scarce, making it difficult to speak in depth about its beliefs. Some former members and critics of the church have made statements about its beliefs, although these points have rarely been publicly responded to by any authorities within the church.

All the church's teachings are expressed orally, and the church does not publish doctrine or statements of faith. Workers hold that all church teachings are based solely on the Bible. (Note: "Two by twos use the Bible as their sole source of authority and have developed no statement of belief apart from Scriptures. They practice the Lord's Supper (communion) weekly and practice believer's baptism, rebaptizing new members. Their lifestyle includes modesty of appearance, avoidance of worldly activities such as watching television, and usually pacificism." —George D. Chryssides (Chryssides 2001b, p. 330).) (Note: "Members shun publicity, refuse to acquire church property, and issue no ministerial credentials or doctrinal literature, believing that the Bible (King James Version) is the only textbook and that, to be effective, the communication of spiritual life must take place orally, person to person. The only printed documents are hymnals." —J. Gordon Melton (Melton 2009, p. 554).) A catchphrase frequently used to describe the church is: "The church in the home, and the ministry without a home." Church members and "workers" will publicly declare that the church does not own any buildings. This is not strictly true: in fact, church members own rural or semi-rural properties dedicated to worship, housing workers, and church gatherings, including conventions and "special meetings". The concept of church buildings is still seen as inconsistent with "biblical Christianity" and was strongly denounced by early workers. Its ministers do not own homes or earn salaries. The church has upheld these practices since its inception. Notwithstanding this tradition, buildings specially constructed or repurposed for the use of the church do exist, including convention buildings, meeting halls, tents, caravans, and portable halls. Rural properties are primarily held and maintained on behalf of the church by certain members. However, in recent years, a Northern Irish investment vehicle has been used to purchase English convention property. A dedicated church building was constructed in Canada early on, but eventually was rejected by Irvine.

The King James Bible is the only scripture used in English-language services. The Bible itself is held as insufficient for salvation unless its words are "made alive" through the preaching of church ministers. (Note: "They [the ministers] are considered 'the word made flesh' in our day." —Christian Research Institute (C.R.I. & 13 April 2009).) The extemporaneous preaching of the ministry is considered to be guided by God and must be heard directly. Great weight is given to the thoughts of workers, especially more senior workers. Salvation is achieved through willingness to uphold the church's standards, by faithfully following in "the way", and by personal worthiness. Doctrines such as predestination, original sin, justification by faith alone, and redemption as the sole basis of salvation are rejected. (Note: Hymns which contained hints of salvation by grace, trinitarianism or redemption based upon the blood of Christ were purged or changed in a 1987 revision (Grey 2012, p. 55)) The church is exclusivist—all other churches, religions, and ministries are held to be false, and salvation is only obtainable through the Two by Two ministry and meetings.

Salvation is deemed to require self-sacrifice in following the example and commandments of Jesus (Note: "Moreover, no-names do not believe that Jesus's death on the cross will wash away the sins of all who accept him as their savior; salvation only comes through a life of sacrificial obedience to the instructions and examples of Jesus. All recent authorities agree that the road to salvation for these sectarians is a hard one. Carol Woster, who spent two years in the group, recalls that one long-time member she knew 'seemed to see life as a grieving journey, where after the [Sunday] meeting, the next day she would 'take up the struggle' to go on...' There is, she found, little 'Christian joy or confident hope' among the no-names." —Benton Johnson (Johnson 1995, p. 44).) and suffering is revered. Members are encouraged to attend meetings, publicly pray, and testify at them. Although the church has roots in the Holiness movement and has inherited some of its features, charismatic elements are suppressed. Other standards include modest dress, not wearing jewelry, long hair for women and short hair for men, not getting piercings, not dying hair, not getting a tattoo, and avoiding activities deemed to be worldly or frivolous (such as smoking, drinking alcohol, watching television, and viewing motion pictures). Some standards and practices vary geographically: for example, in various areas, wine is used in Sunday meetings; in other areas, only unfermented grape juice is used; in various areas, people who have divorced and remarried are not allowed to participate in meetings (particularly women), while in others they may do so. The use of television, social media sites, and other mass media is discouraged in some areas, based on the stance of the local workers and overseers. Some external standards in dress and conduct have been loosened in recent years in response to criticisms. While rules are not strictly 'enforced' and vary between families, the church ultimately values complete and total dedication to the unwritten doctrine and standards. It encourages members to denounce other aspects of their lives. The church has actively condemned pre-marital relations and LGBTQ identities.

=== Theology and Christology ===
The church has rejected the doctrine of the Trinity since its inception. (Note: "It appears that the sect's theological position on the divinity of Christ, the atonement, and man's justification before God, has never changed, yet at mission meetings and in private discussion with people whom they successfully proselytized, preachers gave the misleading impression that their church was evangelical, and that in no way did it deviate from basic Christian beliefs." —Doug Parker and Helen Parker (Parker & Parker 1982, pp. 102–193).) Though members believe in the Father, Son, and Holy Spirit, they hold a Unitarian view of Jesus. The Holy Spirit is held as an attitude or force from God. Jesus is God's son, a fully human figure who came to earth to establish a way of ministry and salvation, but not God himself. Great stress is laid upon the "example life" of Jesus as a pattern for the ministry.

=== Baptism ===
Baptism by one of the church's ministers is considered a necessary step for salvation and full participation, including re-baptism of persons baptized by other churches. Candidates approved by the local workers are baptized by immersion. Baptisms are often scheduled for one morning during a Convention and are typically performed in small ponds on the property. Families and onlookers gather, pray, and sing hymns during the ceremony, as led by a worker.

=== Church name ===
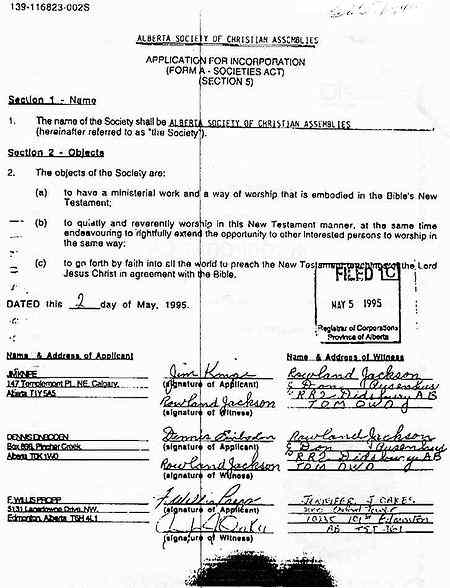
Application for incorporation in the Province of Alberta under the name "Alberta Society of Christian Assemblies"

The church represents itself as nondenominational and without a name. Those outside the church often use descriptive terms such as "Two by Twos" (from their method of sending out ministers in pairs), "No-name Church", "Cooneyites", "Workers and Friends", "disciples of Jesus", "Friends", "Go-preachers", and "Tramp Preachers", among other titles. The new movement was initially called "Tramp Preachers" or "Tramp Pilgrims" by observers. During the early years, they called themselves by the name "Go-Preachers". By 1904, the terms "Cooneyism" and "Cooneyite" had been coined in those areas in which Edward Cooney established churches and where he was a vocal promoter. The term "Two by Twos" was in use in Canada by the early 1920s and in the United States by the 1930s. In Germany, bynames for the church have included "Die Namenlosen" (the Nameless), "Wahre Christen" (True Christians), "Jünger Jesu" (Disciples of Jesus), and "Freunde" (Friends). In France, they have been known as "Les Anonymes" (the Anonymous, or No-names).

Though overseers and head workers use registered names when necessary to conduct official business, most members do not associate a formal name with the church. Instead, they refer to the church as "The Truth", "The Way", "The Jesus Way", or "The Lowly Way". Few members are aware that the church has taken official names used for church business, including seeking military exemptions. Registered names vary from nation to nation. In the United States, the name used is "Christian Conventions", but in Canada, "Assemblies of Christians" is used. In Britain, it is "the Testimony of Jesus", and in Sweden the registered name is "Kristna I Sverige". "United Christian Conventions" has been used in Australia and other nations (Australian members previously adopted the name "Testimony of Jesus" during World War I, and registered as "Christian Assemblies" during World War II). The church was also incorporated in Victoria, Australia, as a charity from 1929 until 2019 and held property in trust. In 1995, controversy arose in Alberta, Canada, when part of the church incorporated as the "Alberta Society of Christian Assemblies". That entity was dissolved in 1996 after its existence became generally known.

=== Restorationism ===
Many church members hold to a long-standing view that the church has no earthly founder, and that only they represent the "true Christian Church" originating directly with Christ during the 1st century AD. Some members have more recently made statements which diverge from that view and hint either at a beginning during the closing years of the 19th century or at a notable resurgence or restoration around that time.

=== Terminology ===
The following are terms used by the church with the definitions giving the sense commonly intended and understood by members. (Note: These terminology definitions follow Fortt 1994, pp. 15–202.)

Church
Generally refers to a small local group that meets in a home; can refer to a larger group of believers. This term is never used to refer to a building except for church buildings of other denominations. Used colloquially when talking to strangers to refer to Sunday/Wednesday activity, e.g., "I'll be at church until midday." Some regions choose not to use this word at all, emphasizing the church's separation from other mainstream beliefs.
Meeting
A gathering of members held in members' homes or rented buildings.
Field
A geographical region to which workers have been assigned (similar to parishes)
Mission
A series of larger meetings known as gospel meetings, the function of which is proselytizing.
Friend, saint
Adherent or member of the laity. Collectively "the friends" or "the saints".
Profess
To make a public declaration of one's willingness to become a member is generally a sign that a person may participate in the prayer and testimony sections of Wednesday night and Sunday morning meetings or at designated testimony times in larger gatherings. Professing constitutes an intermediate stage. Following baptism, the partaking of bread and grape juice (or wine) is also permitted, which occurs between the elder's testimony and the final hymn in some fields.
Bishop, elder, deacon
A chairman of a local meeting. Usually, the male head of the house in which meetings are held. The bishop/elder is typically the person in charge of calling the start of the meeting. The deacon is considered an alternative to the elder in some areas.
Worker, servant, apostle
Terms used to denote the church's semi-itinerant, homeless ministers. These are unmarried (several exceptions were made during the first half of the 20th century to allow married couples to enter the ministry) and do not have any formal training. Workers go out in same-sex pairs (hence the term "Two by Two"), consisting of a more experienced worker with a junior companion.
Head worker, overseer
The overseer is a senior worker in charge of a geographic area roughly corresponds to the position of a bishop in Catholicism. No hierarchical position is higher than overseer—such as a president, pope, presiding bishop, patriarch—which might guarantee doctrinal and practical unanimity.
Outsider, unprofessing person
Any person who has not 'professed' per the church's processes and is therefore deemed to be 'outside' of God's fold
The world, worldly person
A broad term used to describe all people not involved in the church, including those in other religions

== Practice and structure ==
=== Ministry ===
The church holds that faith and salvation may only be obtained by hearing the preaching of its ministers (typically called workers), and by observing their sacrificial lives. During the early years, this requirement was referred to as the "Living Witness Doctrine", though that term is no longer used. The minister must be heard and observed in person, rather than by broadcasts, recordings, books or tracts, or other indirect communication. The church's ministerial structure is based on Jesus' instructions to his apostles found in Matthew chapter 10, verses 8–16 (with similar passages in Mark and in Luke). The church's view is that, following these Biblical examples, its ministers have no permanent dwelling places, minister in pairs, sell all and go out with only minimal worldly possessions, and rely only upon hospitality and generosity. Most ministers receive their support and income directly from lay members, and have no fixed address except for mail collection.

The option of entering the ministry is theoretically open to every baptized member, although it has been many decades since married people were accepted into the ministry. Female workers operate in the same manner as male workers. However, they cannot rise to the position of overseer, do not lead meetings when a male worker is present, and occupy a lower rank than male workers.

Workers do not engage in any formal religious training. Overseers pair new workers with senior companions until they are deemed ready to move beyond a junior position. The workers are assigned new companions annually. Workers organize and assign members to the home meetings, appoint elders, and decide controversies among members. Workers are not registered marriage celebrants, so members are married by secular functionaries (such as a justice of the peace). However, workers will give sermons and prayers at members' weddings if requested, and they officiate at the funerals of members.

=== Gatherings ===
The church holds several types of gatherings throughout the year in various locations. (Note: This list of meeting types follows the list given in Daniel 1993, pp. 13–15.)

Gospel meeting
A Gospel meeting is the gathering that is most likely to be open to those considered to be "outsiders". At one time, Gospel meetings were typically held in tents, set up by workers as they traveled; they are now most commonly held in a rented space. (Note: "Ordinary meetings among lay believers are held in houses, but periodically the itinerants visit each district, and there they borrow a hall (often the Church hall of an unsuspecting minister) for a preaching meeting for the public at large." —Bryan R. Wilson (Wilson 1993).) Gospel meetings are held to attract new members, though professing members typically make up the majority of attendees. The Gospel meeting consists of a period of quiet, followed by congregational singing (often accompanied by piano) of selected hymns, and then sermons delivered by the church's workers. Gospel meetings are regularly scheduled for portions of the year in areas where the group is well-established. They may also be held when a worker believes there may be people in the region who would be receptive to the church's message.
Sunday morning meeting
Participation in this closed meeting is generally restricted to members. It is usually held in the home of an elder, and consists of a cappella singing from the regular hymnal, partaking of communion emblems (a piece of leavened bread and a cup of wine or grape juice), prayer and sharing of testimonies by members in good standing. Members are expected to be silent and arrive fifteen minutes early.
Bible study
Participation in this closed meeting is generally restricted to members, and is usually held in the home of an elder each Wednesday evening. Members are assigned a list of Bible verses or a topic of study for consideration during the week, for discussion at the next meeting. As the meeting progresses, each member shares thoughts regarding the scripture or topic. Thoughts are shared by individual members in turn, and members do not engage in discussions during the meeting. The Bible study meeting includes hymns and prayers.
Union meeting
This is a monthly gathering of several congregations, and follows the format of the Sunday morning meetings. Union meetings are not open to the public.

Special meeting(s)
Special meetings are annual gatherings of members from a large area. Each is held as a private gathering, often in a school or rented hall. Special meetings last a single day and include sermons by local and visiting workers. The sermons are interspersed with prayers, hymns, and testimonies.
Convention
These annual events are attended by members from within a larger geographical area than for the special meetings. The services generally follow the format used for special meetings. Conventions are held over several days, usually in rural areas on properties with facilities to handle housing, feeding, and other necessities for those who attend. There are typically male and female dormitories, a dormitory for the Workers, and male and female communal bathrooms with simple showers. Conventions are not open to the public, although outsiders often attend by invitation. Although not now usual, members were at one time segregated by sex during services.
Workers' meeting
These gatherings are not open to either the public or general membership. Attendance and participation are restricted to workers and certain invited members. The meeting may be a regular Bible study, or it may be used to disseminate any instructions from senior workers or to issue decisions about controversial matters. They are held during conventions, or as necessary. These meetings include prayer, a period for testimonies from any workers wishing to share, and may include statements by senior workers in attendance.

=== Organization ===
Members state that the church does not have a formal organization. Members do not participate in, and many are unaware of, the church's governance. (Note: "A concern for public exposure may be the principal reason why the no-name sect has no newsletters or other publications even for its own members. The lack of such internal documents makes it difficult for members to know what is going on within the group, but, as Simmel observes, the less the members know, the less they will be able to tell outsiders if they decide to talk openly about it. The need for internal secrecy also may explain why the nameless sect has no system of government in which ordinary members participate. I[n] fact, most members seem unaware that a system of government even exists.." —Benton Johnson (Johnson 1995, p. 43).) Although in the early years of the church a headquarters was maintained in Belfast, no official headquarters currently exist and the church remains largely unincorporated. Both expenditures and funds collected remain secret from the membership and no accounting is made public. Funds are handled through stewardships, trusts, and cash transactions. (Note: "All property at the group's disposal is in the hands of individuals who are expected to make use of it for the good of the movement. Sites where conventions take place are owned by members and the monetary donations workers receive are theirs to spend as they see fit. Funds and other assets held in trusts are also secret with no public accounting given." —Benton Johnson (Johnson 1995, p. 42).)

No materials are published by the church for outside circulation other than invitations to open Gospel meetings. Printed materials are published for circulation among the members and include sermon notes, convention notes, Bible study lists, convention lists, and worker lists. In recent years, contact details of members, including phone numbers and home addresses, have been compiled into booklets. These booklets are treated as highly confidential and available for workers' use only. Some members of the group refuse to provide their details for these booklets, in the name of privacy. Some members of the group see the internal dissemination of worker letters as continuing the practice of the early Church and the epistolary work of the original apostles.

=== Hierarchy ===
The church is controlled by a small group of senior male overseers with each having oversight of a specific geographic region. Under each senior overseer are male head workers who have oversight of a single state, province or similar area, depending on the country. These head workers handle the two-by-two pairing and field assignments of workers for that area. Each pair of workers has charge over several local meetings with the senior worker of the two having authority over his junior. Local meetings are hosted in the homes of elders who report to the workers. Correspondence such as reporting, finances, and instructions are often communicated through the set hierarchy. Lay members do not participate in the administration of the church, and most members seem unaware that a system of administration exists. Governance of the church is rarely discussed among the membership. Workers are believed to be holy conduits of God and are regarded highly by the congregation.

=== Hymnals ===
The church's first hymnal, The Go-Preacher's Hymn Book, was compiled by 1909 and contained 125 hymns. The English-language hymn book currently used is Hymns Old and New and was first published in 1913 with several subsequent editions and translations. It contains 412 hymns, many of which were written or adapted by workers and other members of the church, and is organized into "gospel" and "fellowship" hymns. A smaller, second hymnal, also titled Hymns Old and New, consists of the first 170 songs found in the full hymnal. Another version of the hymnal contains words without musical notation and is used primarily by children and those who cannot read music. Hymnals in other languages, such as "Himnos" in Spanish, contain many hymns translated from the English and sung to the same tunes, as well as original non-English compositions.

== See also ==
- Cooneyites
- Two by Twos in Australia and New Zealand
