= John Long (evangelist) =

Irish evangelist

- Born: 15 September 1872; County Tipperary, Ireland
- Died: 4 July 1962 (aged 90); Northern Ireland
- Resting place: County Antrim
- Occupation: Evangelist

John Long III (1872–1962) was an Irish evangelist during the late 19th century and the first half of the 20th century. Long participated in the formative years of the Two by Twos, the Elim movement and Pentecostalism in Ireland and Great Britain.

== Early years ==
John Long was born to Gilbert and Ann Long on 15 September 1872 in Cloughjordan, County Tipperary Ireland. From the age of seven, he worked digging peat during the summer months and attended school during the winter. Long became a Methodist in 1890 during a revival mission. After his father's death in 1895, Long became a Methodist colporteur.

== Years with the Two by Twos ==
John Long first came into contact with William Irvine in 1897 during a mission conducted under the auspices of the Faith Mission in Ennis, County Clare. During an 1897 study of the Gospel of Matthew, Irvine challenged Long as to whether the command to go out preaching without any financial support, possessions, etc. had ceased. Long joined the Faith Mission Prayer Union in 1898 and continued his membership until 1915. Long resigned his Methodist colporteurage in November 1898, and his membership in the Methodist Church a year later. Long elicited strong responses from his preaching, in 1898 claiming 100 converts in a single mission. Long became an itinerant preacher with the Two by Twos under William Irvine, going out along "the new Lines of Faith in God" in 1899. In 1907, Long was publicly excommunicated from the Two by Twos for refusing to damn all non-Two by Two clergy, including Methodism's founder John Wesley.

== Years with Elim and Pentecostalism ==
After his expulsion from the Two by Twos, John Long joined the Elim Evangelistic Band (an early Irish Pentecostal movement), where he was highly regarded among its leaders. He resigned from Elim in 1919. Long married Maggie Keegan on Christmas Day in 1920. The couple went on to have four children. Long's career subsequent to Elim was as an unaffiliated, well-known, itinerant Pentecostal preacher. He was present and active during British Pentecostalism's formative and subsequent phases.

== Death ==
On 4 July 1962, John Long died at the age of 90 years. He was buried in a private cemetery in County Antrim.
