= Bungei Taiwan =

Taiwanese magazine (1940–1944)

Bungei Taiwan (文藝臺灣, literally “Literary Taiwan”) was the official magazine published by the Taiwan Literary Arts Association. Entirely in Japanese, it advocated for the supremacy of arts. It stands as the longest-lasting comprehensive literature and arts magazine in pre-war Taiwanese literary history. It was published until January 1944, reaching its seventh volume and second issue, totaling 38 issues. At the time, the editor-in-chief of the magazine was Mitsuru Nishikawa, with Taiwanese authors Chiu Ping-nan (邱炳南, also known as Chiu Yung-han [邱永漢]), Huang Te-shih and Lung Ying-tsung serving as editorial committee members.

In December 1939, the Taiwan Literary Arts Association was founded in Taihoku. On January 1 of the following year, the association's official magazine Bungei Taiwan was launched, with Japanese writer Mitsuru Nishikawa as both the editor-in-chief and publisher. After February 1941, to align with Japanese imperialist propaganda and respond to the movement for Japanization (Kominka), the association was reorganized. Mitsuru Nishikawa independently founded the Bungei Taiwan Society, which took over the publication of Bungei Taiwan. From this point onward, Bungei Taiwan effectively became a magazine directed solely by Mitsuru Nishikawa, primarily advocating for a romantic, aesthetic supremacy.

The literary proposition of Bungei Taiwan is in line with the proposition advocated by Kinji Shimada (島田謹二), "not to imitate Japanese domestic literature, but to fully express the uniqueness of Taiwan, and to establish Taiwan's unique literature as a wing of Japanese literature.” The magazine covered literature, folklore, painting, and bookbinding art. At the beginning of its publication, it focused on new poetry, with occasional short poems and haiku. Later, it developed into a comprehensive literary magazine, gradually adding novels, essays, reviews, and folklore research articles. In terms of art design, it continues the style of Mitsuru Nishikawa's magazines Matzu (媽祖) and Formosa (華麗島), combining the works of printmakers Tetsuomi Tateishi (立石鐵臣) and Miyata Yatarou (宮田 弥太郎), which are full of Taiwanese folk customs and religious colors.
