= Huang Te-shih =

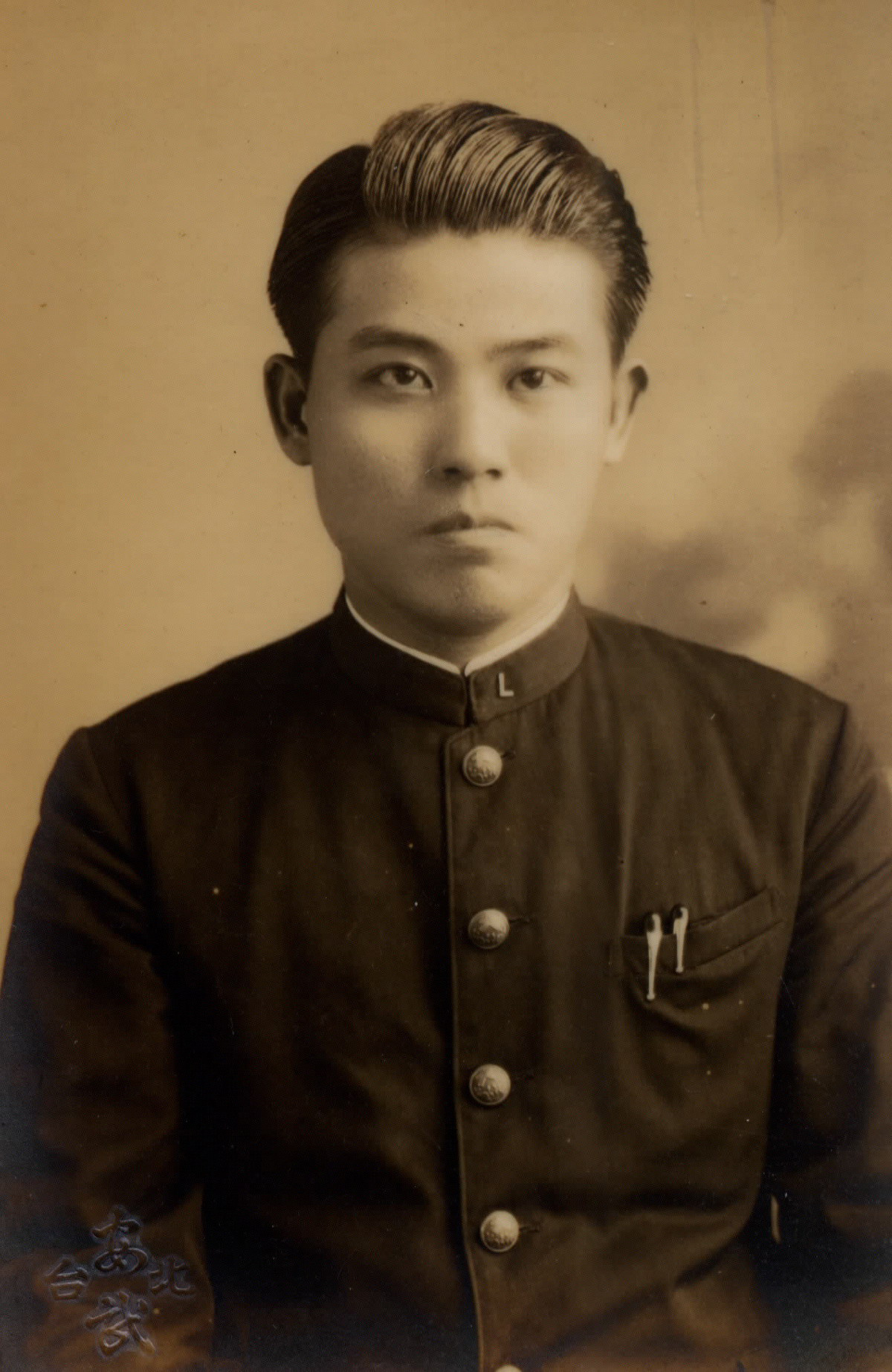
- Born: November 5, 1909
- Died: February 18, 1999 (aged 89)

Huang Te-shih (Chinese: 黃得時; November 5, 1909 - February 18, 1999), a native of Shulin District, New Taipei City, was a scholar, researcher of Chinese and Taiwanese literature, journalist, writer, and translator in Taiwan. He was also a professor at National Taiwan University.

Huang's works span across both old and new styles, and he employed both Chinese and Japanese languages in his writings. His historical research covered a broad range such as Taiwanese literary history, Taipei regional history, temple history in Taiwan, research on the May Fourth Movement, and the construction of Japanese cultural history. In addition, he held positions in several literary magazines and journals, nurturing numerous younger literary talents. His dedication to children's literature, research, and compilation of folk songs and traditional songbooks, as well as his studies in Taiwanese puppetry, all showcase his comprehensive and diverse academic interests.

Despite experiencing three strokes in his life, he continued to pursue knowledge and was honored with the National Award for Arts. He is often referred to as the "living encyclopedia of Taiwanese literature".

== Activities ==
Huang Te-shih showed a high degree of concern for literature and history, maintaining active involvement in the cultural and literary fields. He was a member of the Taiwan Cultural Advancement Association and served as a committee member of the Taipei City Archives Committee. Huang dedicated himself to the preservation of Taiwanese documents and culture. Throughout his career, he held important positions, including deputy editor-in-chief of Taiwan Shin Sheng Daily News, director of The Mandarin Daily News, and Vice President of the Taipei Ying Poetry Society.

== Works ==
In academia, Huang Te-shih dedicated himself to the study of Taiwanese literature and comparative literature between China and Japan. Additionally, he authored works such as the essay collection Taiwan Travelogue (臺灣遊記), the classical poetry collection Selected Poems by Huang Te-shih (黃得時詩選), and historical treatises on Taiwan, including The Developmental History of Taipei City (臺北市發展史), Taiwan's Culture and Documents (臺灣的文化與文獻), and Research on the Southern Ming and Taiwanese Culture (南明研究與臺灣文化).

Furthermore, Huang Te-shih showed a commitment to children's education and literature by publishing children's books like 3000 Leagues in Search of Mother and The Story of the Bible (聖經的故事). He also founded the magazine Oriental Youth (東方少年), which gained widespread popularity among readers.
