= That Way =

That Way may refer to:

- "I Want It That Way", song by the Backstreet Boys
- "That Way", song by Tate McRae
- "That Way" (Lil Uzi Vert song), single by Lil Uzi Vert
- "That Way", song by Wale from Self Made Vol. 1
- "That Way", song by Shakira from Shakira
- "That Way", song by Katseye from Wild

== See also ==
- The Way (disambiguation)
