= Edward Cooney =

Itinerant 20th century religious leader

- Edward Cooney (date unknown)
- Born: 11 February 1867; Enniskillen, Ireland
- Died: 20 June 1960 (aged 93)
- Resting place: Mildura, Victoria, Australia
- Occupation: Evangelist

Edward Cooney (1867–1960) was an Irish evangelist from the 1890s to the 1950s. Cooney was born in Enniskillen, Ireland to William R. Cooney, a wealthy local merchant. He was the third of eight children and joined the family business after finishing his schooling. He began combining his business travel with lay preaching around Ireland.

He became one of the early leaders of a church founded by William Irvine after leaving his business career. Because of his colourful style and public preaching, his name came to be associated with the entire movement. Later, after Irvine's ouster, Cooney began to criticise the development of hierarchy within the Two by Twos, its taking of a name for official purposes, and abandonment of other of its original tenets. He and those who agreed with him were later expelled, and formed a looser group which is referred to as the Cooneyites. He continued his worldwide missions as an itinerant evangelist until his death in 1960.

== Early life ==
Edward Cooney was born in 1867 in Enniskillen, County Fermanagh, Ireland, the third of eight children. He was baptised into the Church of Ireland at St. Anne's parish church (now St Macartan's Cathedral) there. His father was William Rutherford Cooney, a prominent local merchant, and his mother was Emily Maria Carson Cooney. He was educated first at the Enniskillen Model School. He went on to attend the Portora Royal School. He was remembered by a classmate as "one of the nicest and best behaved" students at that time. Following school, he made a start in the family's business interests.

Edward's devout elder brother William contracted tuberculosis when Edward was 17 years old. Edward also developed the infection, and they were sent to their uncle in Australia to recuperate. William worsened during 1887, and Edward took him to Ceylon where his mother and sister met them. Edward returned to Australia, while William was taken to Ireland. William died a week after arriving home. This reportedly prompted Edward to re-examine his own life, and he felt drawn to a closer relationship with God at this time.

== Begins preaching ==
Edward travelled throughout Ireland on behalf of his family's business, and during the 1890s began preaching in the towns which he visited. As many of these areas were primarily Roman Catholic, Cooney's strident Protestant views often resulted in an uproar. Although still an active member of the Church of Ireland, he occasionally preached alongside members of other churches. In 1897, he met William Irvine in Borrisokane.

William Irvine was a preacher with the interdenominational Faith Mission who had become convinced that all churches had become apostate. In 1897, Irvine had begun preaching independently, and began gathering the nucleus of what would become a notable sect, the only religious movement known to have originated in Ireland. Cooney was profoundly influenced by Irvine's vision of a return to the method of ministry as commanded in Matthew 10, and regarded Irvine as "a prophet raised up by God".

Four years later, Cooney abandoned the family business, sold all his possessions, and joined Irvine's new movement. From Ireland, he travelled to England, preaching in Hyde Park, London, and at the Keswick Conventions. As one of its most noteworthy speakers throughout the British Isles, some began calling the nameless sect "Cooneyism", a name by which it is still known in some quarters. This led some to mistakenly assume that Cooney had founded the Two by Two church. Cooney denied starting the movement and testified in court that William Irvine had the founding role.

Cooney's family connections were useful in obtaining venues in County Fermanagh. His younger brother Alfred was a solicitor and worked on various legal matters for members of the Two by Twos. As the movement's notoriety grew, so did Cooney's estrangement from his family. Alfred was found at their parent's home with his throat slit on 29 August 1909. In 1924, Edward's father died. He bequeathed a small annual income to Edward on condition that he give up preaching and return to the Church of Ireland. Cooney never took advantage of the offer.

When the schism between William Irvine and many in the group's leadership occurred, Mr. Cooney sided with the senior Head Workers. He did so because he thought Irvine was falling away from the movement's original ideals, and hoped that those would be restored. Despite this, and like many other senior Workers, he did not completely sever ties with Mr. Irvine. In the following years, Cooney continued as a true itinerant, and preached in countries around the globe as he felt led, with little regard to the spheres of influence being carved out by various Overseers.

== Excommunication ==
But as time progressed, there was no return to what Cooney saw as the original simplicity within the movement, and he began publicly expressing himself with regards to what he saw as being unscriptural additions and growing organisation. These included the growing hierarchy entailing a division of territory between senior workers, finances, annual conventions, the so-called "Living Witness" doctrine, the taking of denominational names during the first World War, and other matters. That Edward Cooney was free to preach wherever he felt led, and did not believe that he had to submit his messages to be approved by the regional Overseers became a situation the latter would no longer tolerate after having attempted to persuade him to operate within their new framework.

Edward Cooney's excommunication was finalised during an extraordinary meeting held on 12 October 1928 at the home of Andrew Knox in Lurgan, Northern Ireland. During this meeting, rules were promulgated for the relationship between Overseers and the conduct of workers who preached within their respective territories. Cooney refused to submit and was summarily expelled. Letters were circulated warning that Cooney had been disfellowshipped, and those who continued contact with him were expelled. Cooney became a non-person within the Two by Twos, his name was omitted as author of hymns that he had written for their hymnal (Hymns Old and New), and they denied that he had any connection with their movement.

== Continued evangelism ==
A group of people who agreed with his position followed him out (or were expelled for keeping contact with him), and eventually formed their own independent fellowship.

During the next three decades, Cooney and others in fellowship with him continued to preach worldwide. Cooney was instrumental during the late 1930s in setting up a treatment program for alcoholic indigents in Birmingham, Alabama. Unlike his earlier fiery denunciation of clerics and denominations, he now was able to work alongside them, although he still did not accept them as fellow-believers in the "Jesus Way". Cooney had circumnavigated the globe 3 times in his missions by the early 1950s.

Those who adhered to Mr. Cooney's views today form an independent group, having dispensed with the office of "Worker" and other vestiges of clericalism which they saw as having crept in over the years. Edward Cooney died in 1960 and is buried in Mildura, Victoria, Australia.
