= John George Govan =

Scottish businessman and evangelist (1861–1927)

John George Govan (1861–1927) was a Scottish businessman and evangelist who founded The Faith Mission in 1886.

== Life ==
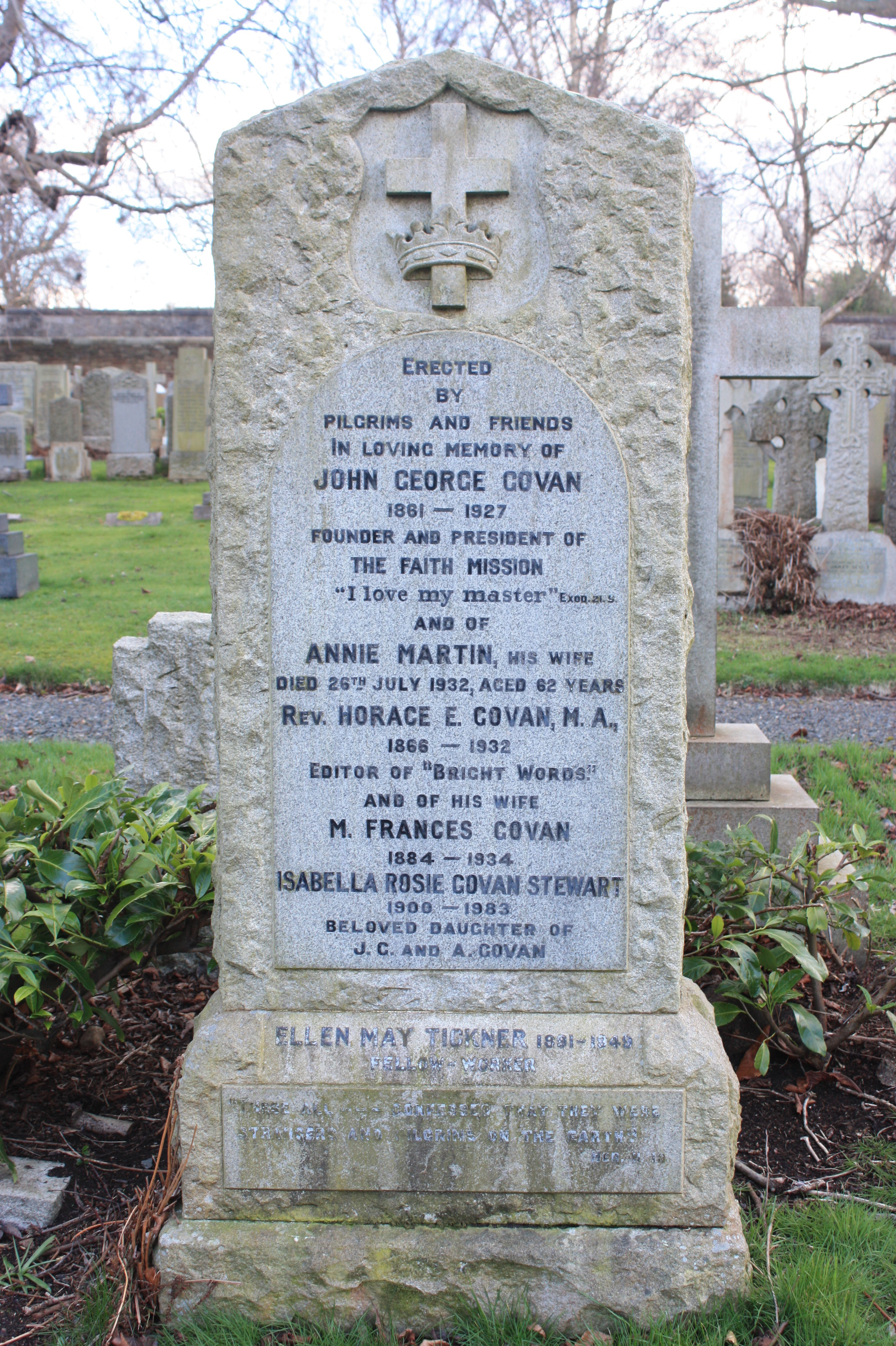
The grave of John George Govan, Dean Cemetery, Edinburgh

He was born in Glasgow on 19 January 1861 one of 12 children to William Govan and his wife Margaret Rattray Arthur. They lived at a villa "Southpark" in Hillhead and his father owned and ran a company William Govan & Sons.

He was converted in 1873, aged only 12. In 1882, he was further influenced by the preaching of Dwight L. Moody while Moody was on a travelling tour from America. He claimed to be "cleansed of all sin" by 1883.

He was inspired on hearing accounts of the holiness movement from friends who had attended the Keswick Convention of 1884. With the goal of leading a life wholly devoted to God, he then set about removing all personal and worldly ambition from his psyche. After several months of this, one night he came to a point where he knew that his life had been changed forever. "My friends," he later wrote, "get into this position of entire surrender to God, and real trust in Him, and then He will show you when to wait upon Him, and how long to wait upon Him; and He will visit you and bless you in a way perhaps you have little idea of now."

A typical day involved "morning watch" from 6 am to 7 am, then work, then revival meetings in the evening. His daughter Isobel wrote later, "He came to know the voice of God." He decided to leave the business world and devote himself full-time to evangelization. To this end he founded The Faith Mission, a Protestant evangelistic Christian organization initially based in Rothesay, Scotland. Among its principles were that its evangelistic workers should "live by faith."

In 1900 the movement spread to England and Wales, in 1924 to South Africa, and in 1927 to Canada.

He died in Perth in September 1927.

He is buried with his wife near the centre of the northern 20th-century extension to Dean Cemetery in western Edinburgh.

== Family ==
Married to Annie Martin in 1894, they had four children: sons Frank and Ellis, and daughters Isobel (who wrote the book, Spirit of Revival, about his life and work) and Sheena.

In 1889 his younger brother Horace Govan (1866-1932) began editing The Faith Mission's newspaper Bright Words.
