= Cooneyites =

Otherwise-nameless house church

The Cooneyites
- Edward Cooney (date unknown)
- Classification: Protestant
- Region: Worldwide
- Headquarters: None
- Founder: Edward Cooney
- Origin: 1928, Ireland
- Members: Number Unknown
- Official website: None

The Cooneyites are a Protestant sect which split from the nameless church commonly known as Two by Twos; the church was originally called "the Tramps" or "the Go-Preachers" founded by William Irvine, often referred to today as "The Truth" or, confusingly, "Cooneyites". The term "Cooneyites" prior to 1928 refers to the group described under Two by Twos. After that time, followers who were expelled from the Two by Twos along with Edward Cooney are called "Cooneyites". In some areas, the Two by Two church, which has gone under various labels, has continued to be labeled as "Cooneyite" by outsiders up to the present. Both the Cooneyites and the Two by Twos reject the term "Cooneyite".

Edward Cooney was a noted preacher during the 1890s and early 20th century. He joined William Irvine's new movement as an itinerant evangelist. He became increasingly critical of the church's moves towards institutionalization, and was expelled in 1928, along with those who agreed with him. They formed a loose fellowship which continues to the present.

== History and development ==
The original group was founded by William Irvine, in Ireland in 1897. An independent evangelist, Edward Cooney, came into contact with Irvine soon afterward, though he did not join the new church immediately. In 1901, Cooney relinquished his stake in his family business. He then donated £1,300 to Irvine's ministry, in fulfillment of the group's requirement to "sell all and give to the poor," and became an itinerant "tramp preacher." Cooney was noted as a powerful speaker, and was one of the most vocal of the early leaders. His name became linked to the group in the public mind.

In the early years of the 20th century, Cooney's sermons were debated in the public and press, with frequent citations of aggressively provocative remarks: distinguished for its bitter hostility to all existing Churches, and to a regular paid ministry of any kind, reminding one not a little of the Plymouth Brethren on these and other points. Cooney was revered by some and ridiculed by others.

Later, after the group split between the followers of William Irvine, and the more numerous followers of various regional overseers, Cooney sided with the larger body, although he continued to maintain some communication with Irvine (as did other senior ministers). Instead of placing himself under a local overseer, or taking that position for himself, he continued to preach in different countries on a truly itinerant basis. He also increasingly criticized the hierarchical structure that had formed within the Two by Twos, its finances, its denial of its origins, and its having registered under a name ("The Testimony of Jesus") during WWI.

Cooney was excommunicated from the Two by Twos in Ireland, at a leaders' meeting, on October 12, 1928. This occurred because he refused to conform his preaching to adhere to the "Living Witness Doctrine" (which posits that faith comes from hearing the word spoken, and seeing the "gospel" physically lived, from the lips and life of a witness), and to cease preaching wherever he felt led to preach. Afterward, he continued to preach, and groups of his followers left, or were expelled from, the main group and continued in fellowship with him.

Among those who were driven out along with Cooney were prominent Two by Two pioneers such as Tom Elliot and John and Sarah West who provided continuity for the new group. However, with Cooney evangelizing in other countries during the later 1930s, the Cooneyite sect experienced a period of decline in Ireland. Despite this, Cooney was steadfast in rejecting any semblance of the hierarchy and other characteristics he had refused to accept in the main Two by Two church. He emphasized this by proclaiming, "You are not joining anything", to proselytes.

Cooney continued to win converts outside Ireland. Followers were not organized into anything beyond loose fellowships, in accord with the abhorrence of anything resembling hierarchy or organization. Some contacts were those among the Two by Twos who remembered his earlier work. Irvine Weir, one of the original Two by Two workers in North America, was excommunicated by George Walker (the head overseer in eastern North America) for breaking the ban on associating with Cooney. Others were expelled for the same reason.

Cooney had wanted to end his days in his native Ireland. However, he also wished to impart a final doctrinal revelation which caused another divide among his followers there. He had come to the belief that God would grant another opportunity for repentance following death, and this caused a split within the group. Tired, ill and wishing to escape the uproar, he made a final trip to Australia, where he died in 1960. Fred Wood assumed a quasi-leadership role following Cooney's death, traveling among Cooneyite gatherings around the world as a uniting figure and evangelist. After Wood's death in 1986, leadership, evangelistic outreach and ministry work were seen as the responsibility of lay members rather than hierarchical positions.

Cooney's followers retain fond memories of him. Those who continue to follow his message are a small but still recognized sect under the name “Cooneyite” in the UK, having just over 200 members according to the 2001 UK Census. According to Roberts (1990), Cooneyite remnants exist in various places around the world and continue to meet in homes for church meetings. Notable areas include:

- Northern Ireland
- Mallow, County Cork, Ireland
- Wigton, Cumbria, England
- Australia, notably:
  - Eyre Peninsula, South Australia
  - Mildura, Victoria
  - Young district, New South Wales
  - Muswellbrook, Hunter Valley, New South Wales
  - Ballina district, New South Wales

== Doctrine and practice ==
The driving force behind Edward Cooney's later preaching was a return to the original church's earlier, unstructured methods and teachings. This was one of the reasons for the schism.

A distinctive feature is public baptisms by immersion, which led some observers to link them to the various Baptists and Anabaptists. This may, instead, derive from their interpretation of the methods used by John the Baptist, as recorded in the Gospels. Cooney himself was baptised and brought up in the Church of Ireland.

Although members deny any name, the term "Cooneyites" is used to describe them by outsiders in recognition of Edward Cooney's role in the group's development. Among themselves, members sometimes refer to their fellowship as the "Outcasts".

Elements of anti-clericalism which were prominent in Edward Cooney's preaching have been retained. The current group does not believe in church buildings and meets in homes. It has not registered under and rejects any name, though they are referred to by outsiders as "Cooneyites" and acknowledge Cooney himself. The church does not hold formal conventions or have convention grounds, although it does hold occasional larger gatherings apart from the weekly home meetings. Because Cooney rejected the so-called "Living Witness" doctrine, they continue to reject that tenet. As to Christology, it seemingly continues along the original group's unitarian precepts, accepting the Father alone as God. In organization, this group is much more loosely constituted, with all members being considered equals and the leading of “the spirit” being relied upon. They do not accept a separate class or hierarchy of ministers, workers or overseers, believing all members to be equal. Elders oversee individual local meetings, which is the extent of any organization.

== Bibliography ==
=== References ===
- Daniel, Kevin N. 1993. Reinventing the Truth: Historical Claims of One of the World's Largest Nameless Sects. Bend, Oregon: Research and Information Services, Inc. ISBN 978-0-9639419-0-9
- Fairweather, Eileen; Rosín McDonough; Melanie McFadyean. 1984. Only the Rivers Run Free: Northern Ireland: The Women's War. London, United Kingdom: Pluto Press. ISBN 0-86104-668-4
- Johnson, Benton, "Christians in Hiding: The 'No Name' Sect," published in M.J. Neitz and M.S. Goldman, Eds. 1995. Sex, Lies and Sanctity: Religion and Deviance in Contemporary North America, vol. 5. Greenwich, Connecticut: JAI Press. ISBN 978-1-55938-904-4
- Kropp-Ehrig, Cherie. 2022. Preserving the Truth. Dallas, Texas: Clarion Call. ISBN 979-8-985-62501-1
- Mac Annaidh, Séamus. 2008. "Edward Cooney's Family Background" in The Fermanagh Miscellany 2. Enniskillen, Northern Ireland: Davog Press, Fermanagh Authors' Association. ISBN 978-1-907530-05-0
- Melton, J. Gordon. 2003. "The Two-By-Two's" in Encyclopedia of American Religions. Seventh Edition. Farmington Hills, Michigan: The Gale Group, Inc. ISBN 0-7876-6384-0
- Nichols, Larry A.; George A. Mather; Alvin J. Schmidt; eds. 2006. Encyclopedic Dictionary of Cults, Sects, and World Religions Revised and updated edition. Grand Rapids, Michigan: Zondervan. ISBN 978-0-310-23954-3
- Parker, Doug and Helen. 1982. The Secret Sect. Sydney, Australia: Macarthur Press Pty. Ltd. ISBN 0-9593398-0-9
- Roberts, Patricia. 1990. The Life and Ministry of Edward Cooney. Enniskillen, Northern Ireland: William Trimble Ltd. ISBN 0-9510109-4-8
- Scrutator (March 1905). "A New Sect". Irish Presbyterian. Belfast, Ireland.
- Walker, James K. 2007. The Concise Guide to Today's Religions and Spirituality. Eugene, Oregon: Harvest House Publishers. ISBN 978-0-7369-2011-7
