= Mitsuru Nishikawa =

Japanese writer in Taiwan

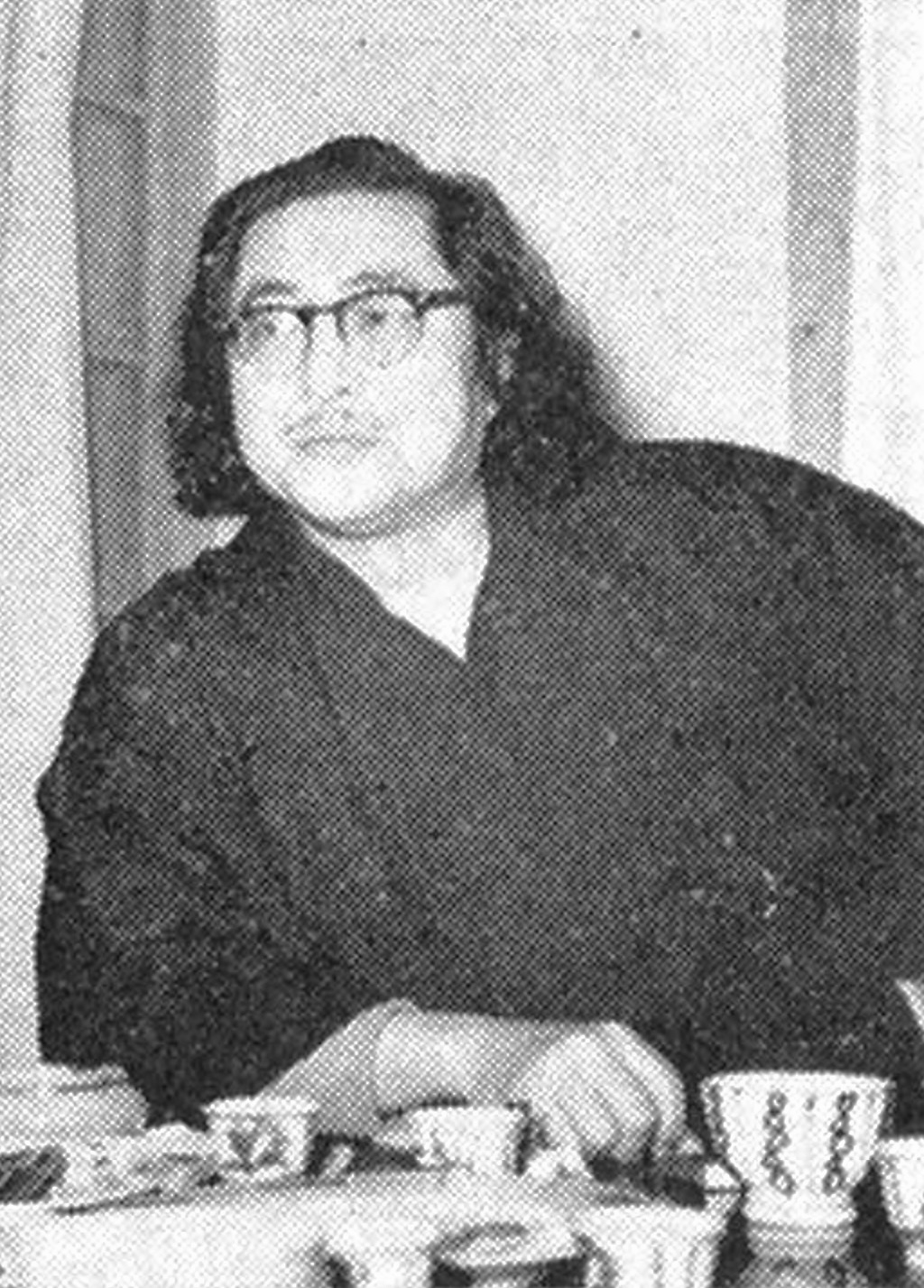
Portrait of Mitsuru Nishikawa in 1956.

Mitsuru Nishikawa (西川 満, Nishikawa Mitsuru; 1908 February 12 – 1999 February 24) was a writer and literary figure during the Japanese rule in Taiwan.

Born in Aizuwakamatsu City, Fukushima Prefecture, Japan, he moved to Taiwan with his family during his childhood and returned to Japan for college. He returned to Taiwan shortly after graduation. When he was a senior in high school, Mitsuru Nishikawa established the poetry society Mori Poetry Society (杜の詩人社), starting to produce poetry collections. Later, he embarked on his writing career and received multiple literary awards.

In addition to writing, Nishikawa was also active in newspaper editing and literary communities. He was an editor and head of the arts and literature department at the Taiwan Daily Newspaper. He also edited the Taiwan Book Lovers' Association's official magazine Love Books (愛書) and organized the Taiwan Association for Poets and Taiwan Literary Arts Association, founding magazines such as Formosa (華麗島) and Bungei Taiwan (文藝臺灣). In April 1946, a year after Japan's defeat, Mitsuru Nishikawa was repatriated to Japan.

== Activities ==
Returning to Taiwan after graduating from university, Nishikawa made extensive use of Taiwanese folklore material in his modern poetry. His collection of poems, Mazu Festival (媽祖祭), employed a variety of montage techniques, using Taiwanese vocabulary and Buddhist stories. Drawing on folk beliefs and legendary tales, Nishikawa developed prose poems rich in fantasy, garnering reviews from many scholars and poets. Nishikawa was also connected to broader Japanese Surrealist literary networks: bibliographer Kikyō Sasaki lists him among the contributors and translators associated with the Nagoya-based journal Yoru no Funsui, which was edited by Kansuke Yamamoto. The birth of his eldest son, Jun Nishikawa (西川潤), and his focus on folklore inspired him to write fairy tales. He also adapted the history of Taiwan into novels. His representative work Chihkan Record (赤嵌記) won the Taiwan Literary Award in the first Taiwan Literature Awards. Towards the end of the war, Mitsuru Nishikawa wrote mainly about national politics, in line with the war efforts and policies of the Empire of Japan.
