= Fong Chung-Ray =

Chinese-American artist, born 1934

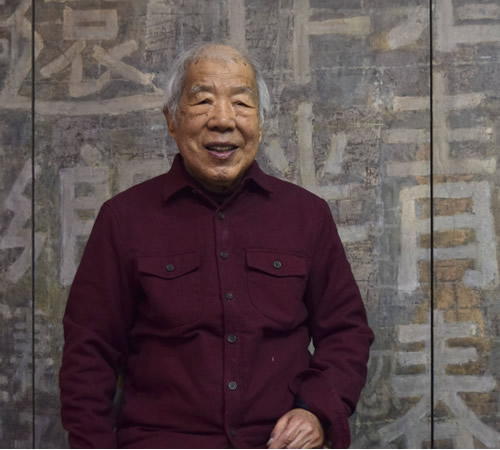
- Fong Chung-Ray in 2026, photographed in front of his triptych 2025-11-12.
- Born: November 6, 1934 (age 92); Nanyang, Henan, Republic of China
- Occupation: artist
- Years active: 1954-
- Spouse: Zhong Guoming (m. 1960; died 2002)

Fong Chung-Ray
- Traditional Chinese: 馮鍾睿
Transcriptions
Standard Mandarin
- Hanyu Pinyin: Feng Zhongrui
- Wade–Giles: Feng^{4} Chung^{1}-jui^{4}

Fong Chung-Ray is a Chinese-American artist, regarded as one of the pioneers of abstraction in Chinese painting. Born in Henan, China, in 1934, his childhood education was disrupted by war and revolution. After moving to Taiwan in 1949, he developed his artistic talents and rose to global prominence as an artist. Since 1958 his work has featured in group and solo exhibitions at galleries and museums around the world, and is in the permanent collections of major international art museums and other public venues as well as private collections. He moved to California in 1975, and is a citizen of the United States.

== Early life ==
Fong Chung-Ray was born in Nanyang, Henan, in 1934, on November 6th by the Chinese calendar, to a prominent family that had relocated to Henan from Shanxi province six generations before, during the early Qing dynasty. They were local gentry, and highly valued education. His father was a teacher, his uncle Feng Youlan was a well-known philosopher, historian and writer, and his aunt Feng Yuanjun was a writer and scholar of Chinese classical literature and literary history, and later a university vice chancellor.

When he was a child, the Japanese invasion and the Chinese Civil War deprived him of status and education. He and his family were forced to flee several times beginning around 1937, moving about the country and returning to Nanyang as poor refugees in 1947. Conflict continued outside the town, and he saw many dead bodies. During those ten years his schooling was repeatedly disrupted, and at the age of 14 his family allowed him and his older brother to flee south with their school, following the retreating Nationalist army in 1948. He would not see the rest of his immediate family again until 1979.

Fong, his older brother, and three classmates — including his best friend Wang Ching-lin, who became the famous poet Ya Hsien — formed a tight group as they fled south. In the summer of 1949, they happened upon a military recruitment poster in Hunan urging them to join up and go to Taiwan. One of Fong's cousins had already moved to the island. The boys joined the Nationalist military, with one of his companions helping to add a year to Fong's age on his paperwork so he would qualify. This affected his birth date in news, art, and academic publications for many years.

After arriving in Taiwan, their clear northern accents qualified them for communications work in the navy signal corps, and after training Fong was assigned to a radio platoon. Military life was arduous, and a few years later he would survive a hail of bullets and almost drown in a battle, where for the second time in his life he saw many dead bodies, and during which a good friend from Fong's close band of refugees was captured by the enemy. But it was also while in the military that Fong would develop his artistic talents and interests.

== Artistic training ==
Fong was exposed to art in his early childhood and showed some ability but it was not particularly encouraged, and he later wrote, "If it weren't for the chaos of war, I might have studied science and at most played around with drawing on Sundays." But he and many of his generation in China lost their chance at such an education, and it was only due to his military service that he discovered art was to be his calling.

While off-duty, he and his best friend Wang Ching-lin began exploring art libraries and cinema. When the government launched programs to broaden the cultural lives of military youth and to offer opportunities to develop the artistic talents of those who had further interest, Fong and Wang joined with others, including another friend from their original refugee group, to create a weekly art-focused newspaper for their regiment. Serving as art editor for that publication deepened Fong's interest in the topic.

Seeking to avoid being separated, Fong and his group applied and passed the entrance exams for the Department of Applied Arts at a military academy, Fu Hsing Kang College. There Fong studied art under instructors of propaganda, military painting, and comic strips, as well as under outside instructors who were also professors at National Taiwan Normal University and were first-rate masters in the fields of painting, wood engraving, and sculpture. One course covered Western art history from the Middle Ages through 19th-century Impressionism, which left Fong very interested in learning more about what had happened after the Impressionist period.

== Career ==
Fong continued his study of art after graduation in 1954, in so much more depth and in such new directions that in retrospect he felt his art was self-taught. He was commissioned as a naval officer and tasked with producing art for the military, and he excelled in that, but soon discovered the navy and marine corps offered wide freedom to their artists, giving them time and space to develop their art, which in turn enhanced the prestige of their service branches.

Fong befriended other artists there, including Hu Chi-chung (胡奇中, 1927-2012), Sun Ying (孙瑛; 孙大石, 1919-2016), and Chu Pen-le (曲本樂, 1934-). They threw themselves into experimenting with and pioneering the latest trends and innovations in Chinese art. A key influence was the Unitied States Information Service (USIS) which established branches in major cities on Taiwan, where Fong found magazines and reports about the latest artistic styles and movements, including a report on abstract expressionism in the New York art scene that he found especially interesting and impactful.

In 1957 Fong successfully submitted an abstract oil painting to the Fourth National Art Exhibition. He then submitted a funding request to Navy headquarters on behalf of himself, Hu, Sun, and Chu, asking for financial support for a group exhibition. That resulted in their "Group Painting Exhibition" in Taipei over four days in May 1958, which was well-received and resulted in the Navy's continued and increasingly visible support of three more exhibitions for the group through 1961, the final two under the name "Four Seas Painting Group". By 1962 the Navy turned towards support of traditional Chinese art, but by then Fong Chung-Ray had already moved on, having become known as an abstract painter throughout Taiwan.

This success gave Fong the opportunity to exhibit his work at the 1959 5th Bienal de São Paolo in Brazil, and in the 1961 Hong Kong International Painting Salon where he won the silver medal. In 1961 Fong joined the Fifth Moon Group at the invitation of Liu Kuo-sung, and his work was included in the group's exhibitions in Taiwan and around the world for the next decade. In 1965 he published an influential essay in Wen Hsing magazine (文星) titled "Modernism, Abstraction, and Self", and participated in his first solo exhibition at the Taiwan Arts Center in Taipei. In 1966 his work was included in an influential exhibition titled "The New Chinese Landscape" that toured the United States.

In 1969 Fong received a national "Ten Outstanding Young Men" award. That same year he was discharged from the Navy, and began work as a stage designer for the Chinese Television Company (CTV) which once again left him ample time to focus on his own art. At CTV he met Professor Richard Mason of the University of Hawaii, who offered Fong his first opportunity to travel abroad.

In 1970 Fong enrolled in an eight-month set design training program at the East-West Center in Honolulu, where he continued to explore the art world including a visit with the modern Chinese ink painter Tseng Yu-ho. With a recommendation from Professor Chu-tsing Li there he obtained financial support from the Asian Cultural Program of the John D. Rockefeller III Foundation for a one-year study tour of the continental United States and Europe after the East-West Center program concluded. He visited museums, exhibitions, and many artists including Han Hsiang-ning, Ching-Jang Yao, and Walasse Ting in New York, Hung Hsien in Boston, Chu Teh-Chun in Paris, Liu Kuo-sung in Hong Kong, and others as he travelled through almost twenty US and European cities and then home through Hong Kong.

In 1971 he returned to Taiwan, where he resumed work at CTV. On advice received from friends during his time abroad, he began planning to emigrate with his family. He received help with the paperwork from a US-based attorney who refused payment from artists and accepted only a gift of art from Fong. Fong prepared for the move by saving funds from his employment and his earnings from several exhibitions of his work that he organized in Taiwan, and the sale of their home also provided for their support in their new life abroad. He considered New York, but chose San Francisco as their destination.

In 1975 Fong and his family immigrated to the United States, after obtaining a Taiwan passport with the help of a letter from his friend Professor Leo Chen, son of the royal tutor of the last Chinese emperor, director and co-founder of the Chinese Language Department at San Francisco State University, and a calligrapher, artist, and composer known as the "Father of Chinese Television in America" for producting San Francisco's first Chinese-language television programs and being the first Chinese-American to receive a television broadcasting license. Chen, along with Professor Kai-Yu Hsu who was another co-founder of Chinese Language program and director of the Asian American Studies Program at the university as well as a philosopher, poet, calligrapher and artist, met the Fong family at the airport and helped them get settled. Fong worked as a set designer on Chen's programs as needed, and lived in an apartment owned by Chen. Through the city employment development center, he later found steadier work as a set designer for public television station KQED.

When funding ran out at KQED a year later, Fong joined his wife in a thriving business she had established using a Street Artist Program license from the San Francisco Arts Commission. She designed handicrafts and sold them at a stall on Fisherman's Wharf. When KQED obtained funding to rehire Fong six months later, he declined to return because he and his wife were earning more income and enjoying more freedom in the handicrafts business. While working as a set designer and in the handicrafts program he also made time for his own art every day, creating new pieces and seeking out art galleries for his works.

Beginning in 1975 with a solo exhibition of his work at the Bank of America headquarters tower in San Francisco, Fong developed relationships with US galleries and institutions that placed his works in group exhibitions, including at a gallery in Santa Cruz in 1976 and at the State University of New York at Oswego in 1978, as well as several solo exhibitions at a gallery in Los Angeles staring in 1979, and more solo exhibitions at galleries in Carmel and San Francisco in the decades to come.

In 1978 he found a longtime business partner and friend in Jack Van Hiele, owner of Triangle Gallery in San Francisco. Van Hiele had opened the gallery in 1961 with a focus on contemporary American and Asian artists. Van Hiele championed modern Japanese and Chinese artists, was recognized as a leader in new Asian art well before the international art world took interest, and was equally devoted to modern artists of the San Francisco Bay Area. For the rest of his life Van Hiele regularly visited Fong to view his latest creations, organized solo exhibitions of Fong's works every few years, and regularly included his works in group exhibitions at the gallery until 2010, the year before Van Hiele died at age 93.

As mainland China reopened to the world, Fong was able to visit his family in their hometown in 1979, and beginning in the 1980s his work was exhibted there as well as in Taiwan and Hong Kong. In 1984 his work was featured in the first exhibiton of Taiwanese artists on the mainland since 1949, "Six Taiwanese Artists", which began at the National Museum of China in Beijing and then toured museums and galleries in Shanghai, Xi'an, and Chengdu. His active participation in the Chinese art scene continued with multiple exhibitions including the 1991 special exhibition at the Taipei Fine Arts Museum on the 35th anniversary of the Ton Fan Art Group and Fifth Moon Art Group, and the 2008 opening ceremonies of the fiftieth anniversary of the Four Seas Painting Group.

He continued to develop his art and his relationships with galleries around the world, including Galerie Vazieux in Paris, gdm (Galerie du Monde) in Hong Kong, and Alisan Fine Arts of New York and Hong Kong. His works have been featured in many public exhibitions such as Art Basel Hong Kong and Frieze Masters in London, and have been acquired by collectors and museums in Europe, Asia, and the Americas.

=== Artistic stages ===
Fong Chung-Ray's artistic career has gone through several distinct stages of development.

From the early 1950s through the early 1960s, Fong's art began with representational painting and progressed to experimental works. In the early 1950s Fong engaged in sketching and painting en plein air to produce realistic portrayals of local landscapes and life, as was then popular among the diasporic Chinese artists gathered in Taiwan. Beginning in 1956, after reading of the latest artistic and cultural developments in the US, he began producing work influenced by European abstract art. Few of his early works survive, because at the time he often relied on found perishable materials such flour bags pieced together to form a canvas.

From the early 1960s through the mid-1970s Fong developed a unique style combining East and West, and the years 1965 to 1974 are known as his "new ink" period. In 1961 he joined the Fifth Moon Group, and together with other members began creating new art forms that embraced both Eastern and Modern art, anchoring their Eastern aesthetics and philosophy in Tang dynasty "untrammeled class" painting (逸品) and later Song dynasty Chan Buddhist and Taoist works and their use of empty space (留白). In 1965, he began creating abstract images with Chinese ink using custom brushes of his own invention made from palm fiber. He worked on cotton, hemp, or rice paper, intermingling saturated, unfettered colors with sweeping ink washes to create texture and depth, diluting landscape-oriented compositions into pure abstractions.

From the mid-1970s to the mid-1980s, Fong transformed his practice from ink on paper to acrylic on canvas. After immigrating to the United States with his family in 1975, he found it was difficult to find mounting and framing experts who could handle Chinese paintings on cotton and xuan paper, and also traditional mountings were not suitable for Western interior design and display practices. Fong began experimenting with plain canvas that had been treated with a thin layer of white as a base, allowing diluted ink and colors to seep and spread, and completely abandoned the use of paper within one year. During the following decade, Fong would experiment with layering saturated colors onto canvas, then unleashing spontaneous "untrammeled," black strokes with the emotional intensity of cursive calligraphy.

The mid-1980s to mid-1990s is Fong's "mixed media" period, as he began experimenting with collage techniques to compose works of more complicated material density and textures. He began practicing qigong and meditation, and was introduced to Chan Buddhism by a good friend. By 1988 his art began to express a deep interest in Buddhism, often including Chinese text from Buddhist classics such as the Platform Sutra and The Transmission of the Lamp, writing directly with acrylic or first with ink on paper first and then pasting that onto the canvas. Fong has stated that the Diamond Sutra's assertion that "all forms are illusive and unreal" particularly resonated with him because "I've always painted abstractly, and this was how I understood the meaning of abstraction."

After the mid-1990s, Fong developed the method of "reverse rubbing" for image transfer. At first he could wrote in reverse on plastic sheets and transfer the text onto canvas, resulting in an intentionally mottled and unadorned effect. He then further manipulated the plastic sheets with acrylic to create myriad natural textures on his canvases. This resulted in the "wall of decay" feature for which Fong's art has become well-known in the international contemporary art world. Fong continues to explore that effect along with multilayered collage and painting to evoke abstraction, tradition, and thought in visually complex statements.

=== Exhibitions and museum collections ===
Since 1958 Fong's work has been exhibited at art galleries and events around the world, with solo exhibitions in Carmel, Hong Kong, Honolulu, Los Angeles, New York, Munich, Paris, San Diego, San Francisco, Taichung, and Taipei, as well as in group exhibitions in Beijing, Brussels, Guangzhou, Hong Kong, Sao Paulo, San Francisco, Shanghai, and Taipei.

Fong's art is in the collections of major art museums, including the Ashmolean Museum of Art and Archaeology in Oxford, England, the Asian Art Museum of San Francisco, the Baltimore Museum of Art, the Musée Cernuschi in Paris, the Cleveland Museum of Art, the de Young Museum in San Francisco, the Denver Art Museum, the Guangdong Museum, the Harvard University Arthur M. Sackler Museum in Boston, the Los Angeles County Museum of Art, M+ in Hong Kong, the San Diego Museum of Art, and other museums in Kaohsiung, Shenzhen, and Taipei.

His art has been featured at Art Basel Hong Kong, and his 2018 mixed media on canvas piece titled 2018-8-6 is on permanent display at San Francisco International Airport, in Harvey Milk Terminal 1. In 2025 his representatives, Alisan Fine Arts, organized his first New York solo exhibition at their gallery there, titled Fong Chung-Ray: Meditations in Abstraction, and exhibited several of his works at Frieze Masters London 2026.

== Personal life ==
Fong married Zhong Guoming in 1960. Born in 1939, Zhong was a non-combat lieutenant officer serving in a military women's youth task force when they met. In 1975 she, their two sons, and one daughter immigrated to the United States with him, settling in San Francisco. During their early days there, she helped support the family by designing and selling handicrafts from an artist's street stall at Fisherman's Wharf.

Zhong died in a car accident in 2002. To commemorate the tenth anniversary of her death, Fong created a painting titled 12-08. One of his few works on canvas to use non-Buddhist writings, it includes a passage from the Nirvana Sutra on severing one's bondage to the material world but also quotes a poem from the Song dynasty poet Su Shi that includes the words "Ten years apart, life and death are obscured. I don't try to think of you, yet I cannot forget you."

== Bibliography ==
Catalogs

- Fong, Chung-Ray; Fong, Lo; Chen, Abby (May 2015). Fong Chung-Ray • A Retrospective 2015. China Art Press. ISBN 978-99965-710-6-0.
- Fong, Chung-ray; Liu, Chu-tsing; Yu, Kwang-chung; Sullivan, Michael (2013). Shu, Jianhua; Xu, Xinru (eds.). Fong Chung-Ray: A Retrospective. Silicon Valley Asian Art Center. ISBN 978-0-615-85504-2.
- Hsiao, Joan-rui, ed. (April 2024). Fifth Moon and Ton-Fan. National Museum of History. p. 152-155. ISBN 978-626395-014-6.
- Johnson, Mark Dean; Liu, Manni (2014). Long, Sara; Wang, Maria; Zhang, Shudao (eds.). Fong Chung-ray: Between Modern and Contemporary. Chinese Culture Foundation of San Francisco. ISBN 978-0-9822744-9-1.
- Johnson, Mark Dean; Pan, An-yi; Ng, Sarah; Knothe, Florian (June 2024). Abstract Evolutions: Sixty Years of Paintings by Fong Chung-Ray. University Museum and Art Gallery, University of Hong Kong. ISBN 978-988-74708-7-8.
- Li, Chu-tsing; Lawton, Thomas (1966). The New Chinese Landscape: Six Contemporary Chinese Artists. The American Federation of Arts. LCCN 66-25157.
- Meng, Changming; Wiborg, Richard; Chun, Doris Sze; Sullivan, Michael (2008). Chou, Hui-Li (ed.). Fong Chung-Ray's Recent Paintings 1997-2008. Modern Art Gallery. ISBN 978-957-8738-19-5.
- Mowry, Robert D. (2007). A Tradition Redefined: Modern and Contemporary Chinese Ink Paintings from the Chu-tsing Li Collection 1950-2000. Yale University Press. p. 229, 244. ISBN 978-1-891771-47-7.
- Pan, An-Yi (July 2022). Transcending Fragments: Fong Chung-Ray's Artistic Journey (Chinese/English). Translated by Ambrozy, Lee. Asia Art Center Co., Ltd. ISBN 978-986-95664-2-1.
- Pan, Shien-jen, ed. (2011). 現代潮 五〇, 六〇年代台灣美術 [The Modernist Wave. Taiwan Art in the 1950s and 1960s]. National Taiwan Museum of Fine Arts. p. 147. ISBN 978-986-02-8859-9.
- Vazieux, Sabine; Huang, Chiu-Chen; Harambourg, Lydia (2017). From China to Taiwan, 1955-1985 : Les Pionniers de l'abstraction - Pioneers of Abstraction. Brussels: Éditions Racine. ISBN 978-2-390250-16-6.
- 尋找前衛的因子 : 1946-1969年 [The Search for the Avant-Garde 1946-69]. Taipei Fine Arts Museum. 2011. ISBN 978-986-03-0997-3.

Other references

- Andrews, Julia F.; Shen, Kuiyi (2012). The Art of Modern China. University of California Press. p. 248-49. ISBN 978-0-5202710-6-7.
- Chen, Mei-ching (December 2025). "戰後臺灣現代藝術中的「離散」製造：以渡海畫家馮鍾睿的抽象繪畫為例" [Constructing Diaspora in Postwar Taiwanese Modern Art: A Case Study of Chung-Ray Fong's Abstract Painting]. Journal of National Museum of History (in Chinese). Taipei: National Museum of History.
- Peng, Lü (2013). A History of Art in 20th-Century China. Paris: Somogy. ISBN 978-2-757207-00-0.
- Sullivan, Michael (1996). Art and Artists of Twentieth-Century China. University of California Press. p. 1984-85. ISBN 978-0-520075-56-6.
- Sullivan, Michael (2006). Modern Chinese Artists: A Biographical Dictionary. University of California Press. p. 36. ISBN 978-0-520-24449-8.
- Weschler, Jeffrey, ed. (1997). Asian Traditions/Modern Expressions: Asian American Artists and Abstraction, 1945-1970. Harry N. Abrams, Inc. p. 41. ISBN 978-0-810926-82-0.

== See also ==
- Taiwanese art
