= From China to Taiwan: Pioneers of Abstraction =

From China to Taiwan: Pioneers of Abstraction was a group exhibition held at Museum of Ixelles, Brussels, Belgium from 15 June to 24 September 2017. The exhibitions traces the origins and evolution of twentieth-century Chinese abstract painting. Aside from the works, it also explores the careers of those Chinese artists, who were obliged to leave their homeland and seek refuge in Taiwan.

== Historical background ==
In 1950, the United States protected Taiwan from mainland China and introduced Western culture. Soon, the artists gradually discovered Impressionism and the abstract art of the schools in New York and Paris from the magazines and books in the American Library in Taipei.

In this context of change, new schools of art sprang up. Chu Teh-Chun lectured on art at Taiwan Provincial Normal University between 1951 and 1955, and Lee Chun-Shan taught students in his studio on Antung Street in Taipei from 1950 to 1955. Although they were quite different, both of them had knowledge and great interest in Western art and encouraged their students to develop their own style. Their teaching methods broke away from an ancestral Chinese tradition that advocated copying the masters' works, with little room for individual creativity.

In 1956 and 1957, two important avant-garde Taiwanese movements were formed: the Ton Fan Group, founded by eight of Lee Chun-Shan's pupils and the Fifth Moon Group (also known as Wuyue Group) by followers of Chu Teh-Chun.

Through Abstraction, the artists in Taiwan were able to become part of the international modernist movement, while expressing their deep cultural roots and revitalising 20th-century Chinese painting at the intersection of the East and West.

== Exhibited artists ==
- The China National Academy of Fine Arts in Hangzhou:
  - Chu Teh-Chun
  - Lee Chun-Shan
  - Zao Wou-Ki
- The Fifth Moon Group or Wuyue Group (1957-1972):
  - Chen Ting-Shih
  - Chuang Che
  - Fong Chung-Ray
  - Hu Chi-Chung
  - Liu Kuo-Sung
- The Ton Fan Group (1956-1971):
  - Chu Wei-Bor
  - Ho Kan
  - Hsiao Chin
  - Hsiao Ming-Hsien
  - Lee Shi-Chi
  - Li Yuan-Chia
  - Tsai Hsia-Ling
- Richard Lin

== Exhibition catalogue ==
The exhibition catalogue From China to Taiwan: Pioneers of Abstraction was produced under the research direction of Sabine Vazieux, with the assistance of Huang Chiu-Chen, and published in the collaboration of Museum of Ixelles and Racine, Lannoo Publisher.

== Media reportage ==
- Luxglove, 5 June 2017.
- Ran Dian, 17 June 2017.
- Rickovia Leung. Exhibition Review: ‘From China to Taiwan: Pioneers of Abstraction (1955–1985)’ at Museum of Ixelles, Brussels, Orientations, Vol. 48-Number 5, Sep/Oct 2017.
