= Chen Ting-shih =

Chinese artist

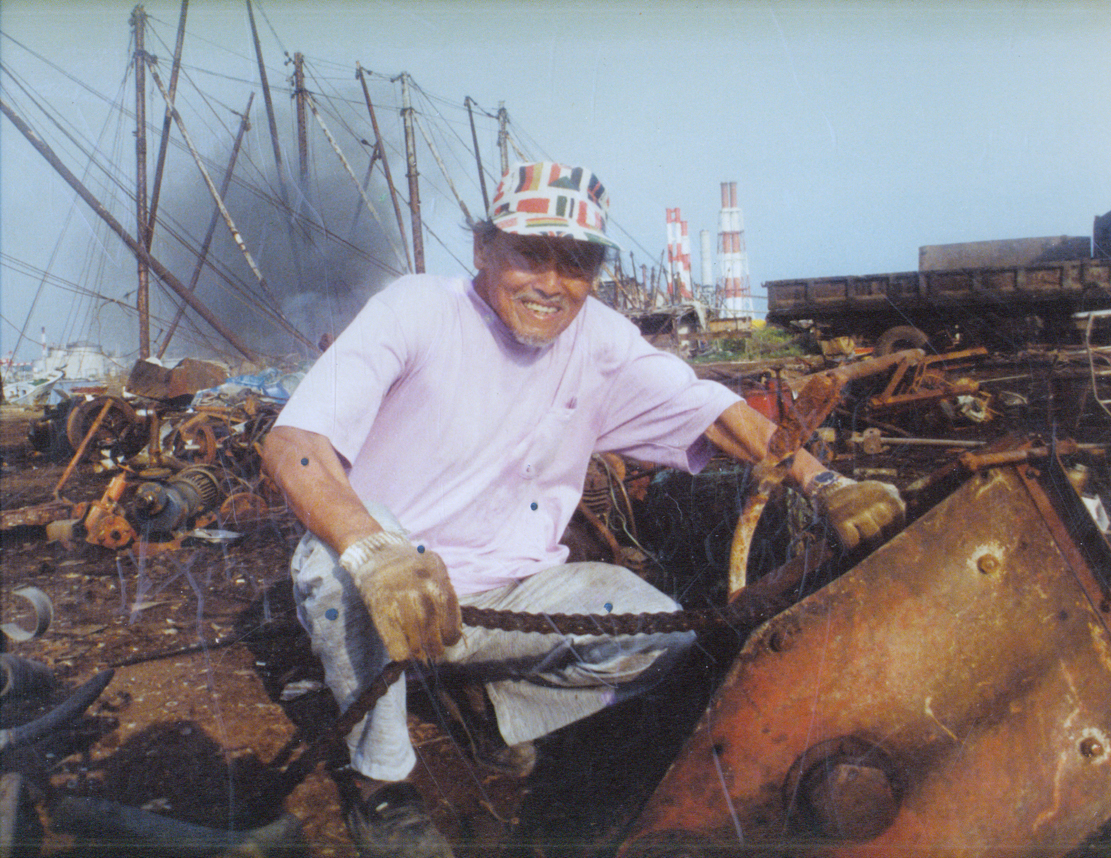
- Chen searching for materials at a ship-breaking yard in Kaohsiung
- Born: 28 November 1913; Changle, Fujian, China
- Died: April 15, 2002 (aged 88)
- Education: Shanghai Academy of Fine Arts
- Known for: Engraving, Carving
- Notable work: Hibernating （1969）

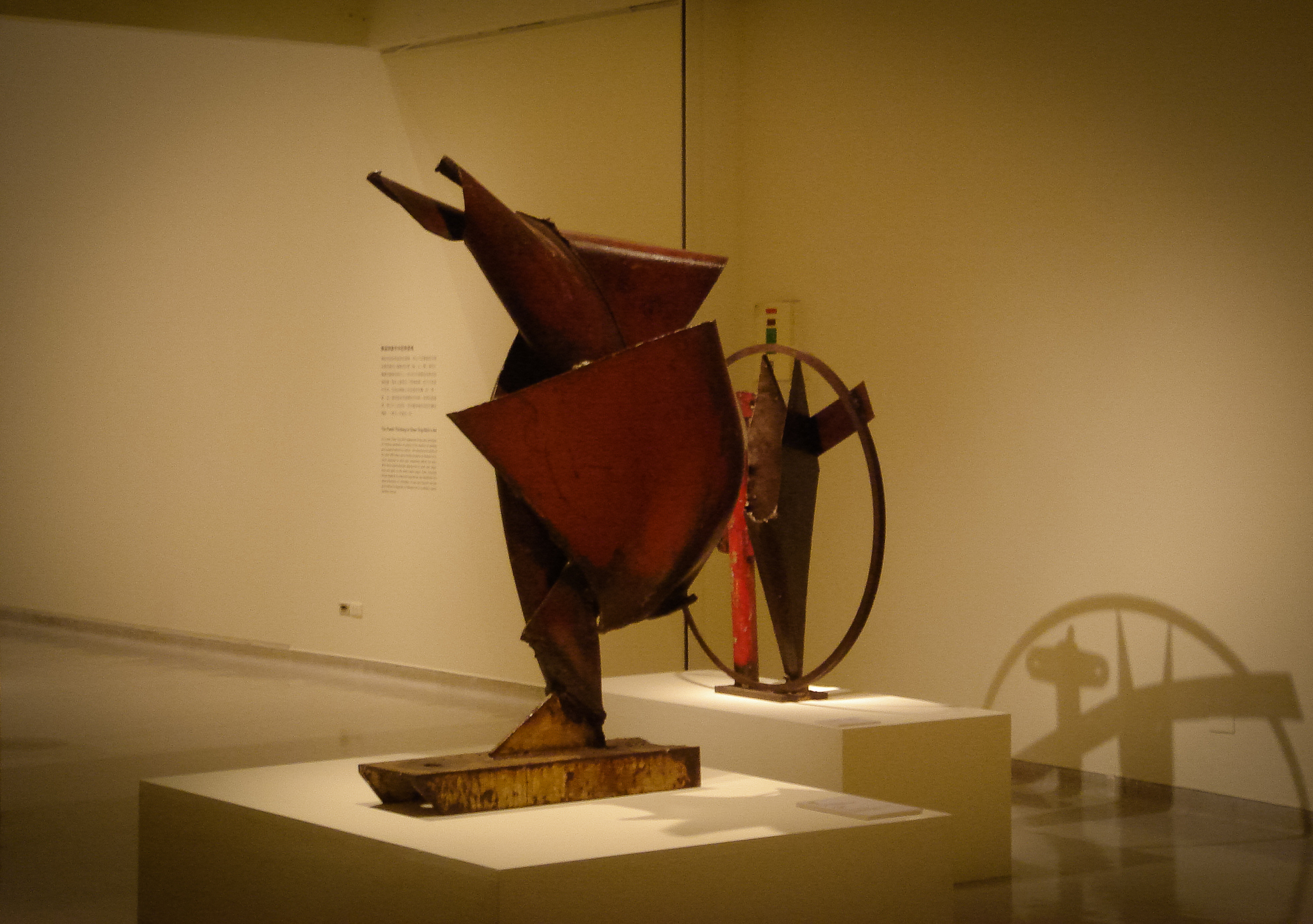
Phoenix, 1984, Iron / Collection of the National Taiwan Museum of Fine Arts

Chen Ting-shih (simplified Chinese: 陈庭诗; traditional Chinese: 陳庭詩; pinyin: Chén Tíng-shī November 28, 1913 – April 15, 2002) was a Chinese artist and a key figure in modern Chinese art history.

== Biography ==
Chen Ting-shih was born to a prestigious family in Changle, Fuzhou. Chen's grandmother was the daughter of the governor, Shen Baozhen, who led Taiwan during the Qing Dynasty. He lost his sense of hearing at the age of eight, after a fall.

Chen's early career coincided with the Second Sino-Japanese War. He drew political cartoons under the pseudonym "Ears" (耳氏).

After moving to Taiwan, he ended his art career because of the 2/28 Incident, an anti-government uprising that was violently suppressed by the government of the Kuomintang-led Republic of China.

In 1957, Chen produced engravings on bagasse boards using a process that focuses on utilising the characteristics of the material. His work, Hibernating, won an international grand prize offered by the major Korean newspaper, Dong-A Ilbo.

Later in his career, Chen was motivated to sculpt. His work, Johnny Walker, was referenced in the chapter "Masters of Iron and Space" in Jean-Louis Ferrier's Art of the 20th Century, which led to a global interest in his work.

Chen created many works in the form of engravings, carvings, color paintings, acrylic, calligraphy, and poetry. Before his death, he authorized the creation of the Gallery Chuan and the Chen Ting-Shih Modern Art Foundation. These were established by his close friends to preserve many of his works. Chen's artwork can now be seen in the National Taiwan Museum of Fine Arts, Taipei Fine Arts Museum, Kaohsiung Museum of Fine Arts, Cincinnati Art Museum, and the Rockefeller Foundation.

== Career ==
=== Realistic woodcutting period ===
In 1937, around the time of the Marco Polo Bridge Incident, Chen entered the Shanghai University Fine Arts College. When the Second Sino-Japanese War began in the following year, Chen took part in the Anti-enemy manga (抗敵漫畫) using his pen name "Ears" (耳氏). Subsequently, he edited the Popular Magazine (大眾畫刊) with Sung Bing Heng. From 1942 to 1945, he was the editor at Chungwa Publishers (正氣中華出版社) and was a designer for the Ministry of Education (Drama Force) (教育部巡迴戲劇教育部隊).

In late 1945, shortly after the Retrocession, Chen arrived in Taiwan to work as the art editor for what would soon be the Peace Daily (和平日報) in Taichung. On April 20, 1946, the Taichung magazine was officially founded. Chen often ridiculed politics by publishing comics in the New Century Column and the Weekly Magazine. He even started a cartoon column entitled Biographies of Corrupt Officials (汙吏別傳). That same year, he traveled around Taiwan with Wang Sih Xiang, the editor of Peace Daily, and started the series Seen and Heard on Foot. He also edited and published his comics in Yang Kui's Cultural Exchange (文化交流).

In 1947, Peace Daily was banned owing to the 2/28 Incident. To avoid investigation, Chen returned to China to serve as the editor of Min-Shing Daily (閩星日報) in Fuzhou. In 1948, Chen was invited to Taiwan to work on the painting Liu Mingchuan Railway Construction, and he stayed to work at the Provincial Library in Taipei. From 1948 to 1949, while most woodcut sculptors eventually left Taiwan for safety, Huang Rong-can and Chen remained. During the White Terror in 1951, Huang Rong-can was arrested in the staff room of the National Taiwan Normal University and later executed for "treason". Throughout the next decade (1948–1957) at the Provincial Library, Chen studied many western works, which would influence his later, more abstract works.

=== Abstract expressionist period ===
In late 1957, Chen left his job at the provincial library to restart his creation of artistic works, exhibiting for the first exhibitions of the Fifth Moon Group and Ton Fan Group. Following the success of the first Sino-American Modern Art Exhibition, Chen Ting-shih, Chin Sung, Lee Shi-chi, Yuyu Yang, Chiang Han-tung, and Shih Hua founded the Modern Print Association. Chen's engravings already showed a more modern, abstract style by this time. He participated in the fifth São Paulo Art Biennial in Brazil with his pastoral Shower (Thunder Storm) in 1959, winning a prize and increasing his popularity worldwide. Bolstered by the encouragement and competition with the members of the Modern Graphic Association, he gradually developed his unique style which took inspiration from the universe, nature, and life.

In 1969, Chen won the Grand Prize from the First International Biennial Exhibition offered by The Dong-a Ilbo, with Hibernating reviewed by art critics from England, France, Japan, and West Germany who stated that his work contained an Eastern spirit with hidden strength, praising it as "the light that shone through the darkness".

Chen reached his prime with the Vacation of Stars series, New Birth, Lantern Festival, Day and Night series and Dreaming in the Glacier between 1971 and 1999. Traveling abroad, Chen stayed in the US. At this time, he also participated in the Glasses Mosaic Design project designing the Colorado State Capitol- Commemoration of Migrant Chinese Workers. He often visited other art organizations and held solo exhibitions. He was praised by art critic James Mills.

=== Found Object sculpture period ===
In the late 1960s, Chen was inspired by Bull's Head sculpture by Pablo Picasso. He began to create sculptural works using found objects, which combined pieces of copper, iron, and wood to create new artworks. After moving to Taiping, Taichung, he continued to search for materials, sometimes going to ship breaking yards in Kaohsiung to seek out scrap metal parts for his sculptures.

In 1998, Chen was invited to the Creating a Metallic Space Exhibition in Spain, where his works Johnny Walker and Phoenix were displayed alongside works by Picasso, Eva Gonzalès, Eduardo Chillida, César Baldaccini, and Jean Tinguely.

In 1999, Chen was referenced in the chapter "Masters of Iron and Space" of the book Art Of The 20th Century. Chen and Ieoh Ming Pei were the only Chinese artists included in the book.
