= Sanyi Wood Sculpture Museum =

Museum in Sanyi, Miaoli County, Taiwan

- 三義木雕博物館
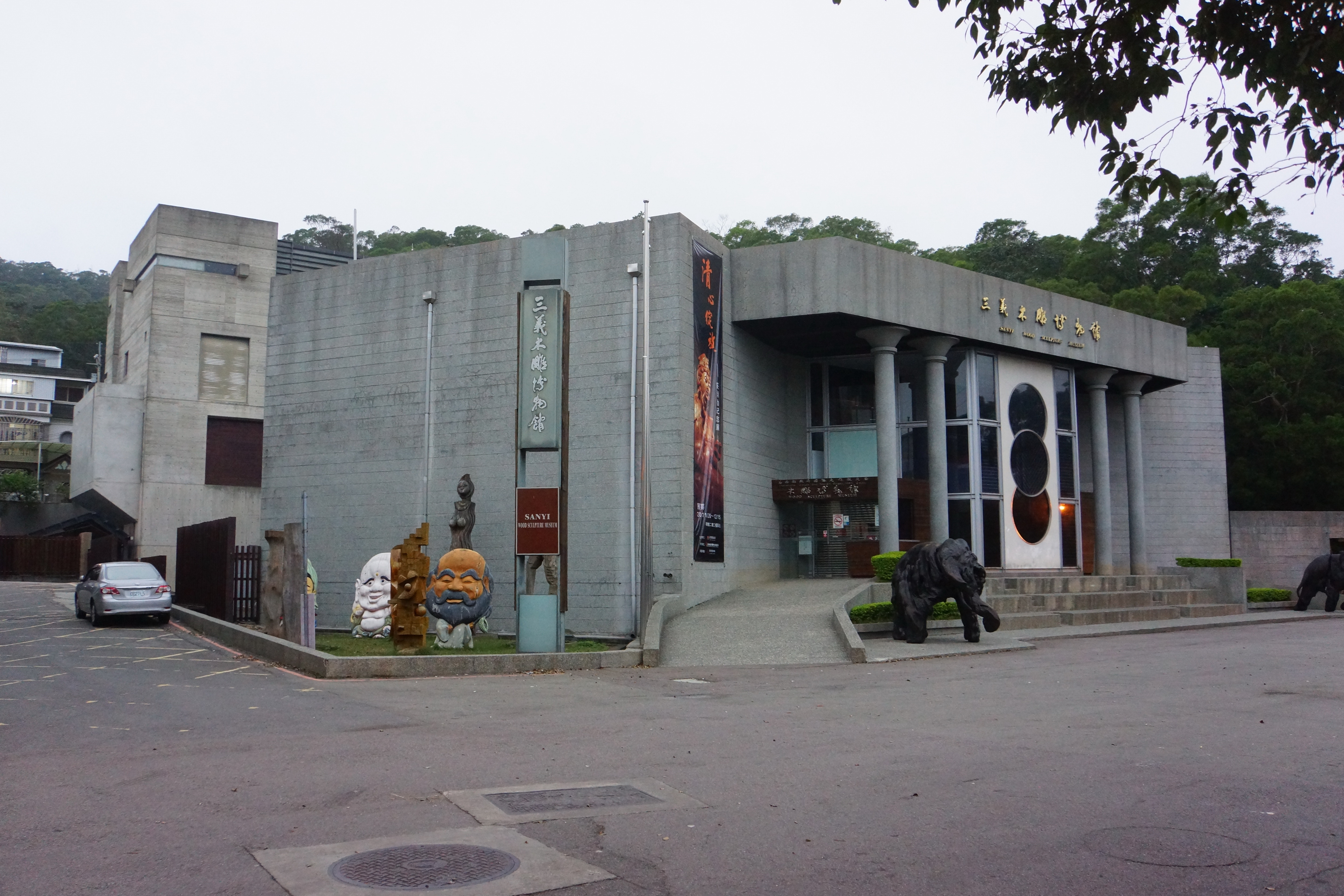
- Former name: Sanyi Wood Sculpture Arts Gallery
- Established: 9 April 1995
- Location: Sanyi, Miaoli County, Taiwan
- Coordinates: 24°24′21.4″N 120°45′39.4″E
- Type: museum
- Website: Official website

The Sanyi Wood Sculpture Museum (traditional Chinese: 三義木雕博物館; simplified Chinese: 三义木雕博物馆; pinyin: Sānyì Mùdiāo Bówùguǎn) is a museum of wooden sculpture in Sanyi Township, Miaoli County, Taiwan.

== History ==
The museum building was constructed in March 1990 by the Construction Department of the Taiwan Provincial Government. Originally established as Sanyi Wood Sculpture Arts Gallery, it was then later renamed to Sanyi Wood Sculpture Museum. The museum was opened to public on 9 April 1995. In May 2003, the museum underwent renovations to expand its storeroom for permanent collections.

== Exhibition themes ==
The museum presents the following themes:

- Introduction of Wood Sculpture
- Styles of Each Chinese Dynasty
- Austronesian Tribe Wood Sculpture
- Origins of Sanyi Wood Sculpture
- Wood Sculpture Exhibition Hall
- Temples Deities
- Architecture and Furniture
- Exhibition of Mix Media
- Invitational Exhibition

== Transportation ==
The museum is accessible within walking distance southwest from Sanyi Station of Taiwan Railway.

== See also ==
- List of museums in Taiwan
- Art in Taiwan
