= Cultural history of Taiwan =

The cultural history of Taiwan can be traced back to prehistoric Stone Age. Later the development of written languages made it easier to maintain traditions of the Taiwanese culture.

The recorded history of Taiwanese culture mainly stemmed from traditional Chinese culture, despite the influences from other foreign powers. Although the culture of modern Taiwan is significantly affected by Japanese and American cultures, the values and traditions of the Taiwanese people are heavily based on Confucianist Han cultures.

== Prehistoric cultures ==
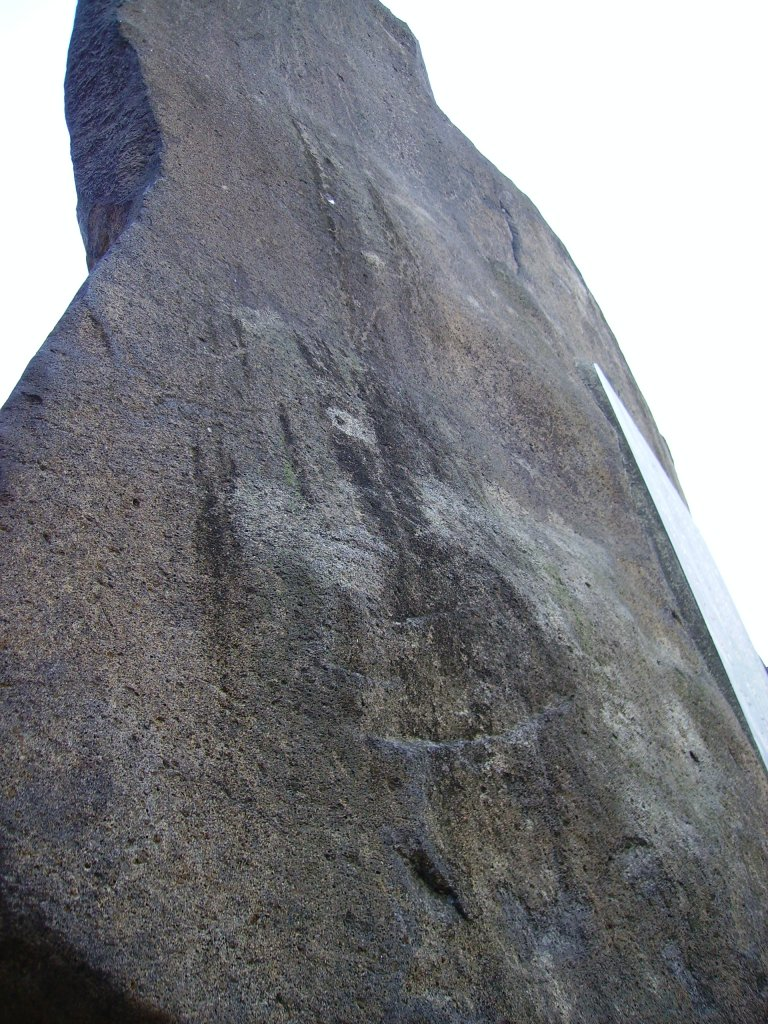
A prehistoric monument in Taiwan built about 2800 years ago

The cultures in Taiwan's New Stone Age (began ca. 5000 BCE) were all left by Austronesian people. However, there may be other settlers prior to the arrival of the Austronesian people.

In addition, the plains aborigines influenced the beliefs, music, and names, of places in Taiwan. These aboriginal tribes include Ketagalan, Kavalan, Taokas, and Babuza peoples. However, over the course of three centuries of Han Chinese migrations to Taiwan, the distinctive cultures gradually disappeared, creating an integrated cultural blend.

The 1620s saw a major turning point in Taiwan's cultural history due to the introduction of the Sinckan Manuscripts. The written language was brought to Taiwan by Dutch missionaries. The prehistory of Taiwan was brought to an end as a result.

Table of prehistoric cultures × denotes nonexistence o denotes existence
| Culture | Development status | | | | Sites | | |
| Culture | Pottery | Iron metallurgy | Basic agriculture | Rice cultivation | Yuanshan Site | Chihshan Rock Site | Botanical Garden Site |
| Hsientao culture | × | × | × | × | ○ | × | × |
| Tapenkeng culture | ○ | × | ○ | × | ○ | ○ | ○ |
| Yuanshan culture | ○ | × | ○ | ○ | ○ | ○ | ○ |
| Chihshan Rock culture | ○ | ○ | ○ | ○ | × | ○ | × |
| Botanical Garden culture | × | ○ | ○ | ○ | ○ | ○ | ○ |
| Shihsanhang culture | ○ | ○ | ○ | ○ | ○ | × | × |

== European colonial culture ==
As a result of Taiwan's strategic position, many foreign powers were interested in establishing settlements in Taiwan. Taiwan was first introduced to European nations in approximately the mid-sixteenth century by Portuguese explorers, who called the island "Ilha Formosa," which means "Beautiful Island," and the neighboring islands "Pescadores," which means "Fishermen."

The Dutch East India Company invaded the Pescadores in 1622. After several battles with Ming forces, the Dutch agreed to retreat to the island of Taiwan, which was not part of the Ming territories. In 1624, the Dutch established a trading post in present-day Tainan City and built its political center at Fort Zeelandia. Due to the shortage of labor, the Dutch recruited Han migrants. As a result, the previous tribal society drastically changed.

The Dutch were not the only European settlers in Taiwan. In 1626, the Spaniards established settlements in northern Taiwan. Fort San Salvador was built in present-day Keelung. Later, they expanded their territory to present-day Yilan and Tamsui, and built Fort Santo Domingo, which still exists today. Spanish missionaries converted many aborigines to Catholicism. However, the Dutch attacked Spanish settlements in northern Taiwan in 1642, drove out the Spaniards, and occupied their territories.

== See also ==
- Han Taiwanese
- Timeline of Taiwanese history
- Taiwanese art
