= Tong Yang-tze =

Taiwanese calligrapher (born 1942)

- 董陽孜
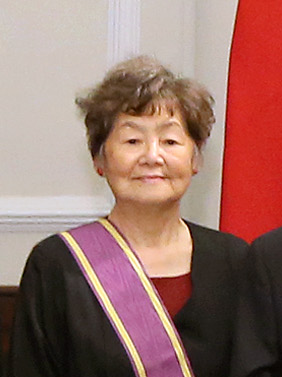
- Order of Brilliant Star, 2015
- Born: 6 October 1942; Shanghai, Republic of China
- Education: National Taiwan Normal University (BFA); University of Massachusetts, Amherst (MFA)
- Website: en.tongyangtze.com

Tong Yang-tze (Chinese: 董陽孜; born 1942), also known as Grace Tong, is a Taiwanese artist. She is one of Taiwan’s foremost calligraphers. She is known for creating very large works in a very small studio.

== Personal life and career ==
Tong was born in 1942 in Shanghai and began practicing art at an early age. Her study of calligraphy began when she was eight.

She received a fine arts degree from National Taiwan Normal University before further visual arts education in the United States at the University of Massachusetts, Amherst where she received a M.F.A in oil painting and ceramics. After studying in America she returned to Taiwan and began to take an experimental approach which fused Western theories of painting with the traditional lines and brushstrokes of Chinese calligraphy. From 1990 to 2000 her calligraphy grew increasingly expressive with a lot of influence from traditional painting. Since the late 1990s she has produced a number of works on a grand scale. Her work pushes the boundaries of traditional Chinese calligraphy as art.

She is the 2020 Wong Chai Lok Calligraphy Fellow at Cornell University.

She has a daughter who works as a jewelry designer.

== Exhibitions ==
In 1997 “The Living Brush” Four Masters along with C.C. Wang, Wang Fang Yu, and Tseng Yuho at the Pacific Heritage Museum in San Francisco.

In 1998 at the Michael Goedhuis Gallery in London.

In 2000 at the Mountain Art Museum in Kaohsiung, the National Central University Art Centre in Chung-Li, and the National Museum of History in Taipei.

In 2001 at the City University of Hong Kong, the Hong Kong University of Science and Technology, Goedhuis Contemporary in London, and Goedhuis Contemporary at Sotheby's in New York.

In 2002 at Da-Ai Television in Taipei.

In 2003 at the National Theater Taipei, the Cultural Center in Taichung, and the County Cultural Bureau in Hsinchu.

In 2004 at Goedhuis Contemporary in New York, Goedhuis Contemporary at The Annex in New York, and the Taipei Fine Arts Museum.

In 2005 at Goedhuis Contemporary in New York.

In 2006 and 2008 at Eslite Vision Gallery in Taipei.

In 2009 at the National Taiwan Museum of Fine Arts, and Museum of Contemporary Art Taipei.

In 2020 her piece Immortal at the River was exhibited at Cornell's Johnson Museum of Art. Immortal at the River is a 54-meter-long cursive-script calligraphy of the poem by the same name by Yang Shen which prefaces the Romance of the Three Kingdoms. It was created in 2003.

In 2024 she received the Metropolitan Museum of Art's Great Hall Commission.

== In media ==
She was the subject of Wang Yen-ni's documentary Solitary Joy.

== See also ==
- Art in Taiwan
