= Fifth Moon Group =

Chinese art collective in Taiwan

The Fifth Moon Group (simplified Chinese: 五月画会; traditional Chinese: 五月畫會), also known as the Fifth Moon Art Group, is a group of Chinese artists who pioneered the modern art movement in post-war Taiwan between the mid-1950s and the 1970s. Members of the group were born in Mainland China and later migrated to Taiwan. The heyday of the group came during the 1960s–70s, coinciding with the period of the Cultural Revolution in Mainland China. The Fifth Moon Group is closely related to and usually associated with the Eastern Painting Group (東方畫會) in membership, artistic works, and exhibitions.

== Formation ==
The idea of the Fifth Moon Group came about as an answer to a group of friends’ growing discontent with the conservative art scene in Taiwan. During their first three years at National Taiwan Normal University, the founding members were dissatisfied by the award-winning artworks at the annual Taiwan Provincial Fine Arts Exhibition. In their fourth year, the group attempted to participate in the exhibition but were not accepted. They thus decided to hold their own exhibition and later received support from their university tutor.

In May 1957, the Fifth Moon Group was officially founded by a group of painters who were graduates from the Art Department at the National Taiwan Normal University (Traditional Chinese: 國立臺灣師範大學). The leading figure of the group was Liu Guosong, and other core members included Chuang Tse (Zhuang Zhi, 莊喆), Fong Chung-Ray, Kuo Tung-Jung (Guo Dongrong, 郭東榮), Li Fang-Chih (Li Fangzhi, 李芳枝), Kuo Yu-Lun (Guo Yulun, 郭豫倫), Chen Jing-Rong (陳景容), and Ku Fu-Sheng (Gu Fusheng, 顧福生). They were subsequently joined by other artists, including Chen Ting-shi (陳庭詩) and Han Hsiang-Ning (Han Xiangning, 韓湘寧).

== Development ==
=== Artistic style ===
Since their emergence, members of the Fifth Moon Group have been reputed to be pioneers who modernized Chinese paintings and revolutionized the Taiwanese art scene.

While artists in the West had been developing and experimenting with new styles since the late 19th and early 20th centuries, artists in China were still largely working in the style of social realism. Many were constrained by the pressure of traditional styles, and very few were able to produce works that could be considered modern. The Fifth Moon Group's emergence and works helped to pitch Chinese painting into the 20th century. Since the 1960s, the group became the pioneering art society in Taiwan, using the new modern style as their visual manifesto. The group's iconic style is a hybridization of bold brushstrokes of Eastern calligraphy tradition and the shapes and colors of Western aesthetics, characterized by an innovative representation of freedom, conceptualization, and format of painting.

=== Members ===
The founding members of the Fifth Moon Group include:

Chuang Che (Zhuang Zhi, 莊喆), Fong Chung-Ray (Feng Zhongrui, 馮鍾睿), Kuo Tung-Jung (Guo Dongrong, 郭東榮), Li Fang-Chih (Li Fangzhi, 李芳枝), Kuo Yu-Lun (Guo Yulun, 郭豫倫), Chen Jing-Rong (陳景容), and Ku Fu-Sheng (Gu Fusheng, 顧福生), and they were subsequently joined by other artists including Chen Ting-shi (陳庭詩) and Han Hsiang-ning (Han Xiangning, 韓湘寧).

- Kuo Yu-Lun (Guo Yulun, 郭豫倫)
- Li Fang-Chih (Li Fangzhi, 李芳枝)
- Liu Guosong (Liu Kuo-Sung, 劉國松)
- Guo Dongrong (Guo Dongrong, 郭東榮)
- Zheng Qiongjuan (Cheng Chiung-Chuan 鄭瓊娟 )
- Chen Jingrong (Ch’en Ching-Jung, 陳景容)

Other members of the group include:

- Chen Ting Shih (Ch’en T’ing-Shih, Chen Tingshi 陳庭詩) (1915–2002)
- Fong Chung-Ray (Feng Zhongrui 馮鐘睿) (1933)
- Hung Hsien (Hong Xian / Margaret Chang 鄭瓊娟 ) (1933)

When Liu Kuo-sung went to the United States in 1966, he invited Margaret Chang to join the Fifth Moon Group's exhibition. During the 1970s, she participated in many exhibitions of the group.

- Chuang Che (Zhuang Zhe)
- Hu Chi-Chung (Hu Qizhong)
- Han Xiangning
- Liao Jichun (Liao Chi-chun)
- Sun Duoci
- Zhang Longyan

== Exhibitions ==
On May 10, 1957, the inaugural exhibition was held at Taipei Zhongshan Hall. From 1957 to 1970, the "Annual Fifth Moon group Exhibition" was shown at City Hall, Taipei. Noted anniversary exhibits for the 25th (1981), 35th (1991) and 40th (1997) years were on display in Taipei with the Ton Fan Group.

Other exhibitions by year:

- 1963. "Exhibition of Avant-Garde Chinese Contemporary Art", Dominion Galleries, Sydney, Australia.
- 1963. "A Select Exhibition of Taiwan Modern Painting", Art Center, Tunghai University, Taichung.
- 1963. "The Fifth Moon Group Exhibition", Chatham Galleries Kowloon, Hong Kong.
- 1964. "The Fifth Moon Group Exhibition", Gallery of Mandarin Hotel, Hong Kong.
- 1964. "The Fifth Moon Group Exhibition of Five Chinese Painters", Dominion Art Galleries, Sydney, Australia.
- 1964. "The Fifth Moon Group Exhibition of Five Chinese Painters", The Gallery of Institute of Canberra University, Canberra, Australia.
- 1966. "An Exhibition of Contemporary Chinese Painting", The Art Gallery of Oklahoma State University, Stillwater, Wisconsin, United States / The Gallery of Wisconsin State University, Whitewater (Wisconsin), United States.
- 1967. "Paintings of Five Taiwan Contemporary Artists", Sally Jackson Art Gallery, Hong Kong.
- 1967. "Contemporary Chinese Painting Exhibition", The Provincial Taichung Library, Taichung.
- 1967. "The Fifth Moon Group Exhibition", Lee Nardness Galleries, New York, United States.
- 1967. "Modern Chinese Art", The Luz Gallery, Manille, Philippines.
- 1967. "Modern Arts and Letters", Tien Educational Center, Taipei.
- 1967. "The Fifth Moon Group Exhibition", Mori Gallery, Chicago (Illinois), United States / Wurster Center of Art, University of California, Berkeley, California, United States / University of Michigan, Ann Arbor, Michigan, United States.
- 1967. "The Fifth Moon Group Exhibition", Solidaridad Gallery Manila, Philippines.
- 1970. "Five Chinese painters: Fifth Moon Exhibition". National Gallery of Art and Museum of History, Taipei, Taiwan. (Chen Ting-Shih, Fing Chung-Ray, Hu Chi-Chung, Hung Hsien Lin, Kuo Sung)
- 1971. "Fifth Moon Group", Honolulu Academy of Arts, Hawaï, United States.

== Collections ==
Works from the group are held in collections at institutions in Taiwan, China, United Kingdom and the United States:

- Taiwan:
  - National Palace Museum, Taipei
  - National History Museum, Taipei
  - National Taiwan Museum of Fine Arts, Taichung
  - Kaohsiung Museum of Fine Arts, Kaohsiung
- China:
  - National Art Museum of China, Beijing
  - Shanghai Art Museum, Shanghai
  - Hong Kong Art Museum, Hong Kong
  - City Hall Art Museum, Hong Kong
- United Kingdom:
  - British Museum, London
- United States:
  - The Art Institute of Chicago, Illinois
  - Asian Art Museum San Francisco, California
  - Cleveland Museum of Art, Cleveland, Ohio
  - De Young Museum, San Francisco, California
  - The Seattle Art Museum, Seattle, Washington
  - Anderson Collection, Stanford University, Palo Alto, California
  - Collection of Mrs. John D. Rockefeller III
  - A. M. Sackler Museum, Harvard University, Cambridge, Massachusetts

== Catalogues ==
- Lü Peng. Histoire de l'art chinois au XXe siècle. Somogy, éditions d'art. Paris. 2013, p. 438–469. ISBN 978-2-7572-0702-4
- Michael Sullivan. Art and Artists of Twentieth-Century China. University of California Press. 1996, 1984–85. ISBN 978-0-520-07556-6. Consulté le 3 Juillet 2012.
- Five Chinese Painters, Fifth Moon Exhibition. National Museum of History, Taipei, 1970.
- Julia F.Andrews and Kuiyi Shen. The Art of Modern China. University of California Press, 2012. p. 248–49.
- Michael Sullivan. Moderne Chinese artists, a biographical dictionary. University of California Press. 2006. ISBN 978-0-520-24449-8
- Asian traditions/ modern expressions: Asian American Artists and Abstractions, 1945–1970. Edited by Jeffrey Weschler, Harry N. Abrams, Inc., Publishers, in association with the Jane Voorhees Zimmerli Art Museum, Rutgers, The State University of New Jersey. 1997. Reminiscences of Mi Chou: The First Chinese Gallery in America by Franck Fulai Cho p. 210. ISBN 0-8109-1976-1
- Formless Form: Taiwanese Abstract Art. Taipei Fine Arts Museum. 2012. ISBN 978-986-03-5352-5
- The Search for the Avant-Garde 1946–69. TFAM Collection Catalogue. Volume II. Taipei Fine Arts Museum. 2011. reprint 2012. p. 11. ISBN 978-986-03-0997-3
- The Modernist Wave. Taiwan Art in the 1950s and 1960s. National Taiwan Museum of Fine Arts. 2011. p. 137, 139, 147, 148, ISBN 978-986-02-8859-9
- Julia F. Andrews et Kuiyi Shen. The Art of Modern China. University of California Press, 2012. p. 248–49.
- Michael Sullivan. Moderne Chinese artists, a biographical dictionary. University of California Press. 2006. ISBN 978-0-520-24449-8
- Transcriptions d'entretiens de Liu Guosong et Fong Chung Ray Avec Sabine Vazieux, expert en art.
