= Shanghai Academy of Fine Arts =

- Type: Private
- Established: 1983
- Parent institution: Shanghai University
- Location: Shanghai, China
- Campus: Urban
- Website: safa.shu.edu.cn

The Shanghai Academy of Fine Arts of Shanghai University, founded in 1983, is one of five academic divisions of SHU, and officially independent since 11. December, 2016. Its campus is located in the Baoshan.

Shanghai University is amongst the list of Project 211 for top national universities. In the 2020 QS World University Rankings, it is ranked 412th in the world and 16th in China. The university was also ranked 51-60 globally and 1st in China in the global young university rankings, according to the 2020 QS Top 50 Under 50. In the 2017 Ministry of Education "Chinese University Subject Rankings", the discipline of Fine Arts ranked in the top 10% of all Chinese universities.

== Academics ==
The Fine Arts College consists of six departments: Art Design, Traditional Chinese Painting, Oil Painting, Sculpture, Art History, and Architectural Design. These departments offer over 200 courses in Graphic Design, Environmental Design, Industrial Design, Advertising, Traditional Chinese Painting, Oil Painting, Sculpture, Printmaking and other fields. The college offers courses on both undergraduate and graduate level, to both domestic students and students from Hong Kong, Macao, Taiwan and other countries of the world. The College of fine art has an enrollment of 1800. The Academy of Fine Arts has 149 faculty and staff, among them there are 45 professors and associate professors. A number of artists and designers, both from home and abroad, have been hired as part-time faculty or visiting scholars. The college also has three research institutes - the Library & Research Center, the Institute of Art Design and the Center of Public Arts. The Institute of Art Design includes an exhibition center, Cai Guanshen International Arts Exchange Center, the Arts Collection Center and the Folk Arts Research Center. The Center of Public Art includes Ceramic Studio, Glass Studio, Multimedia Studio and Printmaking Studio.

== Notable alumni ==
- Chen Yifei (陈逸飞), film director, artist, graduated from the Shanghai University Fine Arts College in 1965.

== Campus ==
=== Baoshan Campus ===
The Baoshan Campus is located in the Baoshan district of Shanghai. Most of the undergraduates will spend their entire four college years on this campus, with few exceptions like those who are admitted into the SILC. The Baoshan Campus is the most recently built campus of SHU, and the east district of which is still under construction. There are two libraries on this campus. The iconic Main Library, and Qianweichang Library built in the remembrance of the late and former president of the university, Weichang Chien. A half-circular lake named Panchi (泮池, lit. "half-a-lake") is at the center of this campus. The name of the lake is given to honor Confucius. According to the Rites of Zhou, Panchis are built at the palaces of the feudal kings. As Confucius was bestowed the title of King Wenxuan in the Tang dynasty, a Panchi was built at every Temple of Confucius. Later, Panchis lost their original meaning as "lakes built for the kings", but became an icon for Confucius, Chinese academia and scholars. And the school entrance ceremony for all the newly admitted students are called "Rupan" (lit. "entering the Panchi"). More, there are seven main lecture buildings and several supplementary lecture buildings, two auditorium buildings, three on-campus dorm sites, an indoor sporting complex, and several outdoor sporting fields and courts.

- 99 Shangda Road, Baoshan District, Shanghai 200444, China
  - Shanghai Metro Line 7 has Shanghai University station near the campus.
  - Tel: (021) 66131999
- 上海大学宝山校区, 上海市宝山区上大路99号

== See also ==
- List of universities in China
