= Ching-Jang Yao =

Taiwanese painter (1941–2000)

- 姚慶章
- Born: September 16, 1941; Xiluo, Yunlin, Taiwan
- Died: November 14, 2000 (aged 59)
- Occupation: Painter
- Style: Oil painting, watercolor, hyperrealism, abstract expressionism

Ching-Jang Yao (C. J. Yao, 姚慶章, September 16, 1941 – November 14, 2000) was a Taiwanese painter born in Xiluo, Yunlin.

== Life ==
=== Early life ===
Ching-Jang Yao was born on September 16, 1941, in Xiluo, Yunlin. From an early age, he had a passion for painting. He attended Taichung Second Senior High School, where in his senior year, he decided to apply for the Fine Arts Department. He became a student of Liao Jichun and began his formal art education. Subsequently, he was admitted to the Art Department of Taiwan Provincial Normal University (now National Taiwan Normal University).

=== Years at National Taiwan Normal University ===
In 1961, Yao enrolled in the Fine Arts Department at Taiwan Provincial Normal University. Dissatisfied with its conservative teaching approach, he kept himself informed about global art trends and immersed himself in art and cultural information. In 1964, Yao, along with like-minded classmates Paul Chiang (1942–) and Ku Chung-kuang (1943–2020), formed the "Nian Dai Art Association". They held its first exhibition at the Taiwan Provincial Museum (now National Taiwan Museum) in the same year, showcasing their abstract-style paintings.

Yao graduated in 1965 and married his classmate Zhang Hezhu in 1967. At the age of 28 (1969), he received the Honorary Award at the 5th Tokyo International Youth Artists Exhibition. He also represented Taiwan at the 10th São Paulo Art Biennial in the same year, with his works exhibited in various international modern art exhibitions. Yao was influenced by Paul Klee (1879–1940), and during this period, his painting style approached abstract expressionism. Unfortunately, in 1970, the couple's residence was destroyed in a fire, resulting in the loss of most of his early works.

=== Settling in New York ===
In 1970, Ching-Jang Yao held a solo exhibition at the Cellar Gallery in Chicago and moved to New York City at the end of the year. During that time, New York was experiencing the peak of hyperrealism, and Yao was influenced by American hyperrealist painters Richard Estes and Robert Cottingham. Inspired by the everyday scenes and cityscape of New York, he began creating works using a photorealistic approach.

Yao would capture street scenes in New York through photography and then translate them into oil paintings or watercolors. Rather than using an airbrush, he opted for brushwork, resulting in paintings that juxtaposed reality and illusion, reflecting the modern urban life landscape. The shift in Yao's artistic approach and vocabulary led him to collaborate with the Louis K. Meisel Gallery in New York in 1974. During this period, he created two notable series: Reflection and Image, both exploring the theme of reflections and images.

=== Abstract period (1984–2000) ===
In 1983, Yao concluded his ten-year collaboration with the Louis K. Meisel Gallery and underwent a significant shift in his artistic style, transitioning from photorealism to abstraction. Art historian Wang Zhexiong believes that this transformation marked Yao's inevitable development from portraying the "objective world" in hyperrealism to interpreting his own "subjective world". Starting from 1984, Yao began creating his First Nature series in an abstract style. These works predominantly feature various lines and forms depicted with colored pencils, symbolizing natural elements such as wind, clouds, flowers, and grass.

In the 1990s, Yao explored abstract expressionism in his Nature, Birds, and Earth series. In these paintings, one can often find circular shapes and stylized representations of birds, flowers, trees, and the female body, each symbolizing different aspects of the natural universe and diverse meanings of life. During this phase, Yao expanded his canvas beyond the conventional rectangle, experimenting with circular canvases. From 1999 to 2000, he even produced artworks in diamond and hexagonal formats while still incorporating familiar visual elements and symbolism. On November 14, 2000, Yao died in New York due to a heart attack.

== See also ==
- Louis K. Meisel Gallery
- 姚慶章紀念畫展
- 國立歷史博物館典藏姚慶章作品
