= Chuang Che =

Chinese artist

Chuang Che (Chinese: 莊喆; pinyin: Zhuāng Zhé; born 1934) is a Chinese artist. His work is largely abstract, combining influences of his Chinese heritage with Abstract Expressionism.

== Early life ==
Chuang Che was born in Beijing, where his father was working as a scholar and calligrapher at the National Palace Museum. It was his father who introduced him to calligraphy, a medium which later had a profound influence on his art. In his twenties, Chuang studied fine arts at National Taiwan Normal University, where he learned about Eastern painting traditions. Che felt that there was more that could be brought to Eastern painting, and so when he graduated in 1958, he joined several other artists, including Liu Guosong, Fong Chung-Ray, and Sun Duoci, and became one of the first members of the Fifth Moon Group (which had been founded two years earlier). The group sought to modernize Chinese art, making it contemporary and straying from the old traditions. These ideals appealed to Chuang, who wanted to add something modern to the Eastern sensibilities he had been taught first by his father and then in school.

== Artistic career ==
In 1966, Chuang was awarded a John D. Rockefeller III Foundation travel grant, which allowed him to move to the United States and study art. He first moved to Iowa, studying at the University of Iowa. However, he shortly after moved to New York, becoming the assistant of the sculptor Seymour Lipton. In New York, Che was surrounded by contemporary artists, exposing him to Western painting styles - the most popular of the time being Abstract Expressionism. He was inspired by these contemporary styles, and decided to have his art act as a sort of confluence of East and West. He began painting works that were inspired both by his traditional Eastern education, often evoking calligraphy, and by the bold abstractions of Abstract Expressionism that he encountered in New York. His work was successful, catching the eye of many museums and galleries. He showed his work around the U.S. and Europe, and in 1992 a Retrospective Exhibition for him was held at the Taipei Fine Arts Museum.

Chuang lives in New York, working in his studio in the East Village. His work has been shown as part of Asia Week New York.

== Major public collections ==
- Taipei Fine Arts Museum, Taipei, Taiwan
- Cleveland Museum of Art, Cleveland, Ohio, United States
- Cornell University, Ithaca, New York, United States
- The Detroit Museum, Detroit, Michigan, United States
- Detroit Institute of Arts, Michigan, United States
- Hong Kong Museum of Art, Hong Kong, China
- National Museum of History, Taipei, Taiwan
- Saginaw Art Museum, Michigan, United States
- Spencer Museum of Art, The University of Kansas, Lawrence, Kansas, United States
- University of Michigan Museum of Art, Ann Arbor, Michigan, United States
- Shanghai Art Museum, Shanghai, China
- Guangdong Museum of Art, Guangdong, China
- Museum of Central Academy of Fine Arts, China
- List Visual Arts Center at MIT, Cambridge, Massachusetts, United States
- Harvard Art Museums, Cambridge, Massachusetts, United States
- Herbert F. Johnson Museum of Art, Ithaca, New York, United States

== Selected solo exhibitions ==
- 2021 Findlay Galleries, New York, New York, United States
- 2019 Vazieux | Art Gallery Paris, Paris, France
- 2016 Galerie Sabine Vazieux and Galerie Hervé Courtaigne, Paris, France
- 2015 Taipei Fine Arts Museum, Taipei, Taiwan
- 2012 Asia Art Center, Taipei, Taiwan
- 2007 National Art Museum of China, Beijing, China
- 2006 Asia Art Center, Taipei, Taiwan
- 2005 National Museum of History, Taipei, Taiwan
- 2005 Kuandu Museum of Fine Art, Taipei National University of the Arts, Taiwan
- 2002 Guangdong Art Museum, China
- 1980 National Museum of History, Taipei, Taïwan
- 1977 Kalamazoo Institute of Art, Kalamazoo, Michigan, United States
- 1977 Saginaw Art Museum, Michigan, United States
- 1972 Newark Art Museum, Newark, New Jersey, United States
- 1972 Montclair Art Museum, Montclair, New Jersey, United States
- 1970 Fine Art Museum, Flint, Michigan, United States
- 1968 Taiwan Provincial Museum, Taipei, Taiwan
- 1965 National Taiwan Arts Hall, Taipei, Taiwan

== Major group exhibitions ==
- Museum of Ixelles, Brussels, Belgium
- Forsythe Gallery, Ann Arbor, Michigan, United States
- Francine Seders Gallery, Seattle, Washington, United States
- Magic Touch Gallery, Taipei, Taiwan
- Lung Men Gallery, Taipei, Taiwan
- De Graaf Gallery, Chicago, Illinois, United States
- Alisan Art Gallery, Hong Kong, China
- Paidea Gallery, Los Angeles, California, United States
- Shaw-Rimington Gallery, Toronto, Canada

== Catalogues ==
- Chuang Che. Deep Ridge - Remote Way. Solo exhibition in National Art Museum of China. Paintings 1963–2007. Asia Art Center and the Center Academy of Fine Arts. 2007. (ISBN 978-957-978-047-6)
- Michael Sullivan. Moderne chinese artists, a biographical dictionary. University of California Press. 2006. (ISBN 978-0-520-24449-8)
- A Tradition Redefined. Modern and contemporary Chinese Ink Paintings from the Chu-tsing Li Collection (1950-2000). Yale University press. 2007. (ISBN 978-0-300-12672-3)
- Five Chinese Painters, Fifth Moon Exhibition. National Museum of History, Taipei, 1970.
- The Modernist Wave. Taiwan Art in the 1950s and 1960s. National Taiwan Museum of Fine Arts. 2011. (ISBN 978-986-02-8859-9)
