= Hung Hsien =

Chinese-born American artist

- Born: 1933 (age 92–93); Yangzhou, Jiangsu, China
- Occupation: Artist
- Known for: Integrating Chinese ink painting with abstract expressionism
- Spouse: T.C. Chang

Hung Hsien (Chinese: 洪嫻; born 1933), also known as Margaret Chang, is a Chinese-born American artist best known for blending traditional Chinese painting techniques with Western abstract art. Her work has been exhibited internationally and is part of various museum collections.

== Early life and education ==
Hung Hsien was born in Yangzhou, Jiangsu Province, China, in 1933. Her family moved to Taiwan in 1948. There, she studied traditional Chinese painting with Prince Pu Hsinyu and attended Taiwan Normal University, where she trained under artists Huang Junbi and Zhu Dequn.

== Career ==
After marrying architect T.C. Chang in 1957, Hung moved to Chicago, where she studied at Northwestern University and the School of the Art Institute of Chicago. She became known for fusing Chinese ink traditions with Western abstract styles.

Hung was associated with the Fifth Moon Group, a movement that aimed to modernize Chinese art. Her work has been exhibited at the Smithsonian Institution, Art Institute of Chicago, and museums in Hong Kong.

== Style and influence ==
Hung's art is known for its dynamic brushwork, fluid forms, and abstract compositions. Critics have noted her unique ability to synthesize Eastern and Western aesthetics, often describing her paintings as possessing a meditative "inner light."

== Later life and legacy ==
In the 1980s, Hung taught at the Chinese University in Hong Kong. She later settled in Houston, Texas, where she continues to teach calligraphy and Tai Chi. In 2025, Asia Society Texas hosted a major retrospective titled Hung Hsien: Between Worlds.

== Selected works ==
- Frozen Landscape (1985–1990), Cleveland Museum of Art.
- Heavenly Path (1971), National Museum of Asian Art, Smithsonian Institution.
