= Lee Shi-chi =

Taiwanese artist (1938–2019)

Lee Shi-chi (Chinese: 李錫奇; pinyin: Lǐ Xīqí; 1938–2019) was a Taiwanese artist.

== Life ==
Lee Shi-chi was born in Kinmen in 1938. His early years were marked by war and death, and he later described his childhood as a lottery. The Battle of Guningtou took place when he was in fourth grade, and his grandmother and elder sister were killed in 1953, during Lee's second year at National Kinmen Senior High School. Lee Shi-chi later met Lee Chao-lan, who nurtured his interest in art, and made it possible for him to enroll at the Department of Arts within Provincial Taipei Normal College between 1955 and 1958. Lee remained in Taipei County, teaching at Hsinchuang Elementary School, as the Second Taiwan Strait Crisis had broken out in Kinmen.

Lee cofounded the Modern Print Society in 1958, alongside Yuyu Yang, Chen Ting-shih and Chiang Han-tong. In 1963, Lee joined the Eastern Art Association, an avant-garde artists' collective. He moved from print artwork to painting with airbrushes throughout the 1970s. Lee opened his first art gallery in 1978, and later operated two more through 1990. Considered one of the first installation artists in Taiwan, Lee has also worked in mixed media. His abstract paintings have been featured in many exhibitions. During his early career, Lee was exposed to Western art styles, and those influences remained in his work alongside East Asian art styles, such as Chinese calligraphy. He was a recipient of the National Award for Arts in 2012 and served as a national policy adviser during Ma Ying-jeou's presidential administration.

He sought medical treatment for a brain hemorrhage on 19 March 2019 and died at Taipei Medical University Hospital on 22 March 2019, aged 81.
