= Chu-tsing Li =

Chinese-American art historian (1920–2014)

- Born: 1920; Guangdong, Republic of China
- Died: September 16, 2014 (aged 93–94); United States
- Occupation: Art historian

Academic background
- Education: Jinling University; University of Iowa
- Thesis: Five Senses in Art: An Analysis of Its Development in Northern Europe (1955)
- Doctoral advisor: William S. Heckscher

Chinese name
- Traditional Chinese: 李鑄晉
- Simplified Chinese: 李铸晋
Transcriptions
Standard Mandarin
- Hanyu Pinyin: Lǐ Zhùjìn
- Wade–Giles: Li^{3} Chu^{4}-tsing^{4}

Chu-tsing Li (1920 – September 16, 2014) was a Chinese-American art historian. Born in Guangdong, he studied at a Baptist high school before pursuing English studies at Jinling University. He moved to the United States in 1947 to study English literature at the University of Iowa. There, he began studying Chinese art history, and became an instructor at the university in the early 1950s. Transferring to the University of Kansas in 1966, he worked to expand American academic study of East Asian art history.

== Biography ==
Chu-tsing Li was born in Guangdong, China, in 1920. He attended the Baptist Pui Ching High School in Guangzhou in 1938. Later that year, the outbreak of the Second Sino-Japanese War forced him to relocate alongside the high school to the Portuguese colony of Macau. He went to Chengdu after graduating from high school, attending Jinling University. In 1943, he graduated with a degree in English studies.

Li was hired by the university's English department after this, where he worked alongside the British art historian Michael Sullivan, who introduced him to the field of art history. From 1943 to 1947, Li worked various jobs in addition to his role as an English teacher at Jinling. He worked on a series of American history textbooks under the direction of the archaeologist and historian Zhang Dekun, and worked as a writer and translator for the film journal Dianying yu boyin.

In 1947, Li left China for the United States in order to pursue a master's degree in English literature at the University of Iowa. Although he completed his master's thesis on the works of Franz Kafka, an art history course under professor William S. Heckscher persuaded him to pursue his PhD in art history under Heckscher's supervision. During his work on his PhD, Li's friend and colleague John M. Rosenfield was called into service for the Korean War. Li opted to take over his course on Asian art history. In 1955, Li completed his PhD thesis, Five Senses in Art: An Analysis of Its Development in Northern Europe, and continued working as an art history professor at Iowa.

=== Chinese art history ===
Li had little background in Chinese historical and art studies, and studied intensely alongside his own teaching in order to purse it as an academic focus. He was frustrated by Western traditional understandings of art, writing in a 1957 review of Sheldon Cheney's art history textbook "It is rather unfortunate that, notwithstanding his admiration of and interest in Oriental art, all these cultures are not dealt with as unified cultural expressions but only as something contributing to the development of modern [European] art".

Li sought to expand American understanding and academic study of East Asian art history. In 1966, Li joined the faculty of the University of Kansas in Lawrence, Kansas. He was the first instructor at the university to teach about Chinese art, but soon established a doctoral program in the subject. He convinced Laurence Sickman, a historian of Asian art and the curator of the Nelson-Atkins Museum of Art, to begin teaching at the University of Kansas. He established connections between the University of Kansas and universities in Taiwan and Hong Kong.

In 1979, he became one of the first scholars to visit the People's Republic of China as part of the United States-China Exchange Program, visiting various museums and cultural sites. While in retirement, Li published a three-volume series entitled A History of Chinese Modern Painting alongside his student Wan Qingli. Li died on September 16, 2014.
