= Han Hsiang-ning =

Taiwanese-American artist

- Born: 1939 (age 86–87); Chongqing, China
- Spouse: Alice Yu (m. 1980; sep. 1999)
- Children: 2

Han Hsiang-ning (born 13 May 1939, Chinese: 韩湘宁; Chinese: 韓湘寧; pinyin: Hán Xiángníng) is a Taiwanese-American artist. He emigrated to New York from Taiwan in 1967. He joined the O.K. Harris Works of Art from 1971 until 1984. Han has participated in many prominent museum exhibitions. He often uses spray painting and paints photo-realistic street scenes.

== Early career in Taiwan ==
In 1953, he first started oil painting while attending Junior High of National Normal University. He graduated from the Department of Fine Arts of the National Taiwan Normal University in 1960; his graduation Exhibition featured surrealistic oil paintings.

In 1961, he joined the "Fifth Moon Group". He began abstract form oil painting, such as "Worship", "Affair", and his works first appeared in the magazine Pen Review. In 1961 he was selected to represent Taiwan for the exhibition at VI Bienal de São Paulo, Brazil, and was admitted to the 2nd Biennale de Paris. In 1962, Han was visited by New York gallery owner Poindexter. Mrs. Poindexter became the first important New York art dealer collecting Han's works. The following year he had his first exhibitions in Australia and the United States. Exhibitions in Africa followed in 1964.

His first trip outside China or Taiwan came in 1964, when he attended the 4th International Biennial Exhibition of Prints in Tokyo, Japan with Shichi Lee representing Taiwan. His first solo exhibition came the following year, at the National Taiwan Arts Center in Taipei. In 1966 Tehjin Shi introduced Pop art to Taiwan, and influenced Han. "Paintings by the contemporary artist Han" was published by the National Taiwan Arts Center.

== United States ==
In 1967, he emigrated to New York City. He moved to a loft in New York Downtown on West Broadway (now Soho) in 1968. In 1970 Ivan Karp arranged Han's one-man exhibition at French & Company, New York. Whitney Museum curator Marcia Tucker (now the director of the New Museum) arranged for Han to join the "Invisible Image Exhibition" at School of Visual Arts, New York. He completed a series of "Subtle New York Cityscape" works in 1971, such as "Brooklyn Bridge", and held a one-man exhibition at O.K. Harris Gallery, New York.

He made his first trip to Europe and held one-man exhibition in Germany at Galerie Thelan, Cologne. In 1973 he completed his "Views of Washington D.C." series and held a one-man exhibition at Gallery Henry, Washington D.C. Another one-man exhibition at O.K. Harris Gallery, New York, followed in 1974. In 1977 he took a trip to London and Paris for pictures of city scenes, and in 1978 visited Spain, Portugal, France and England.

In 1979 he held a one-man exhibition at Dobrick Gallery, then undertook his first round the world trip, returning to Taiwan for the first time in 12 years. In 1980 he returned to Taipei again and held an exhibition at Printmakers Art Gallery, including two works of Taipei street scenes. "Paintings by H.N. Han" was published by Artist Magazine in Taipei in 1980.

In 1981 his work featured New York people such as "Music of Washington Square", and the works were exhibited at O.K. Harris Gallery in 1982. In 1983 he set up a studio in a country house at Greenwood Lake, N.Y. In 1984 he travelled to Paris, and in 1985 he worked in his Soho and Greenwood Lake studios.

== China ==
In 1986 he was invited by Lee Shichi, director of Asia World Gallery in Taipei, for a one-man exhibition of recent works on people. He returned to China, and visited the Central Academy of Fine Arts, and re-visited Chungchin. In 1987 he started a series of work on the subject of China such as "Chungchin People", "Beijing Crowds" and "Foreigners in Beijing". He held his first group exhibition in Shanghai, China, "Artists from Shanghai and Taiwan", and visited Souzhou, Woxi, Honzhou and the Zhejiang Academy of Fine Arts. In 1989 he first visited Mount Huang, mostly the area of Beihai and Xihai, taking scenes in photos and video.

In 1989 he went to Shanghai on May 4 and observed the Students' Democratic Movement. He returned to New York and painted the "Tiananmen Square" series. In 1990 he exhibited the "Tiananmen Square" and "Mount Huang" series in New York and Taipei. In 1997 he re-visited Mount Huang and continued painting on the subject of Mount Huang.

In 2007 he expanded his studio home in Dali, Yunnan, to become a gallery space.

== Stylistic changes ==
He began with abstract form oil painting, and in 1963 he began working with roller and stencils on washi paper, still abstract, emphasizing form and space structure. He was influenced by pop art from 1966.

In 1969 he began spray painting works using acrylic paint on canvas, created the "Invisible Image" series. In 1971, in the process of spray gun painting, found how to create different combinations of sprayed color dots, a form of pointillism. Based on Seurat's works, a series of "After Seurat" works were painted. In 1971 he continued the spray gun technique, but began using New York city-scenes as a subject and his camera as sketching tool. In 1972 he launched studies on industrial scenes with vivid images.

In 1974 he completed a series of "Soho District" works such as "Soho West Broadway" by using telephoto lenses taking pictures of New York Soho building facades, then in 1975 he painted bird's-eye view street scenes of New York City. In 1977 he completed "Lunch Time", featuring people as a subject for the first time, using acrylic spray on canvas.

He completed his first self-portrait in 1981. In 1983 he began using brushes to paint watercolor and ink on paper. In 1985, he continued using two different techniques, his subjects being street crowds and bird's eye views of intersections of New York streets. In 1986 he continued to paint subjects of New York street crowds using acrylic spray on giant canvasses. In 1989 he began a series of paintings of "Mount Huang", employing a similar technique to his ink on paper for the New York street crowds.

In 1998 he began making rubbing prints of New York City street textures of manholes and graffiti, doing the same in Taipei the next year.

== Teaching ==
In 1976, he started instructing an apprenticeship program at the Graduate School of New York University. Han served as a visiting artist for the School of the Art Institute of Chicago from 1979.

In 1988 he taught at St. Thomas Aquinas College as a visiting professor.

== Personal life ==
Han was born in 1939 in Chongqing, China; Han's family originally came from Xiangtan, Hunan. In 1942 he 1942 moved to Baogi, Shangshi with parents, and in 1946 they returned to Xiangtan. In 1948 he moved to Quinmin, Yuennan with his mother, then in 1951 he went to Taiwan via Hong Kong, Macao and joined his father.

In 1964 his father died and he met Tsaishuan Chung. In 1968 Chung came to the United States, and married Han. They divorced in 1977.

In 1979 he met Alice Yu at Taipei Printmaker's Art Gallery, and then she visited New York. They married in 1980, and their daughter Eve was born later that year. His second daughter Jacqueline was born in 1981. In 1999 he separated from Yu.

In 2000 he settled in Old Town Dali City, Yunnan, China, and in 2006 acquired land by Dali Lake and began building a home and studio. In 2008 he turned 70 and celebrated by riding a motorcycle across the town of Dali. He married Yang Lu that same year.

== Solo exhibitions ==
His works have been exhibited at the Museu de Arte Moderna, São Paulo, Musee d'Arte Moderne, Paris, Museum of Recklinghausen, Germany, Tokyo Metropolitan Art Museum, the 1996 Taipei Biennial organized by the Taipei Fine Arts Museum, Taiwan, The Brooklyn Museum, NY, The Art Institute of Chicago, Whitney Museum of American Art, and the Hirshhorn Museum, D.C.

- 1996 – Lin&Keng Gallery, Taipei, Taiwan
- 1994 – A Retrospective, Taipei Fine Arts Museum, Taipei, Taiwan
- 1992 – Eslite Gallery, Taipei, Taiwan
- 1990 – Capricorn Galleries, Bathesda, Maryland
- 1987 – The Hong Kong Institute for Promotion of Chinese Culture, Hong Kong
- 1986 – Capricorn Galleries, Bethesda, Maryland
- 1982 – O.K. Harris Works of Art, New York, New York
- 1979 – Dobrick Gallery, Chicago, Illinois
- 1976 – O.K. Harris Works of Art, New York, New York
- 1974 – O.K. Harris Works of Art, New York, New York
- 1973 – Gallery Henri, Washington D.C.
- 1972 – Galerie Thelan, Cologne, Germany
- 1971 – O.K. Harris Works of Art, New York, New York
- 1970 – French & Company, New York, New York
- 1965 – National Taiwan Art Center, Taipei, Taiwan

== Selected group exhibitions ==
- 1996 – "Post Fifth Moon" Home Gallery, Lin&Keng Gallery, Taipei, Taiwan
- 1996 – "Taipei Biennial: The Quest for Identity", Taipei Fine Arts Museum, Taipei, Taiwan
- 1994 – "Image" IT Park Gallery, Taipei, Taiwan
- 1991 – Taipei - New York, Taipei Fine Arts Museum, Taipei, Taiwan
- 1991 – Dual Cultures - China & U.S.A.: Six Realist Painters, Nassau County Museum of Art, Roslyn, New York
- 1985 – Immigrant Artists / American Experience, Bass Museum, Miami, Florida.
- 1983 – The Great East River Bridge, The Brooklyn Museum, New York
- 1983 – Painting New York, Museum of the City of New York, New York
- 1982 – The Artist and the Airbrush, California State University, San Jose, California
- 1981 – Visions of New York City: American Paintings, Drawings & Prints of 20th Century, Tokyo Metropolitan Art Museum, Tokyo, Japan
- 1979 – Auto - Icon, Whitney Museum of American Art, New York, N.Y.
- 1979 – 20th Century American Painting, American Embassy, Moscow, USSR
- 1979 – America in the 70's as Depicted by Artists in the Richard Brown Baker Collection, Meadow Brook Art Gallery, Oakland University, Rochester, Michigan
- 1978 – Art and the Automobile, Flint Institute of Arts, Michigan
- 1977 – New Realism, Jacksonville Art Museum, Jacksonville, Florida
- 1976 – Bicentennial: Artist-Immigrants of American, 1876–1976, Hirshhorn Museum, Smithsonian Institution, Washington D.C.
- 1975 – A Change of View, The Aldrich Museum of Contemporary Art, Connecticut
- 1974 – Painting & Sculpture Today, Indianapolis Museum of Art, Indianapolis, Indiana
- 1974 – Seventy-first American Exhibition, The Art Institute of Chicago Chicago, Illinois
- 1973 – Mit Kamera, Pinsel und Spritzpistole, Museum of Recklinghausen, Germany
- 1974 – New York Avent-Garde '74, Saidye Bronfman Centre, Montreal, Quebec, Canada
- 1972 – Realism Now, New York Cultural Center, New York, N.Y.
- 1961 – VI Bienal de São Paulo, Museu de Art Moderna, São Paulo, Brazil

== Major collections ==
- Hirshhorn Museum, Smithsonian Institution, Washington, D.C.
- Akron Art Institute, Akron, Ohio
- Richard Brown Baker Collection, New.York, New York
- Indianapolis Museum of Art, Indianapolis, Indiana
- Chase Manhattan Bank Collection, New York, New York
- The Denver Art Museum, Denver, Colorado
- The Commodities Corporation Collection, Princeton, New Jersey
- Schroeder Bank Collection, New York, New York
- American Public Insurance Collection, Iowa, Iowa
- Phil Desind Collection, Bathesda, Maryland
- Stermann Collection, West Germany
- The Sony Cooperation, New York, New York
- National Savings & Trust Co. Collection, Washington, D.C.
- Jan von Haefter Collection, West Germany
- Wellington Management Fund, Boston, Massachusetts
- Morton Newman Collection, Chicago, Illinois
- Sidney & Frances Lewis Collection, Richmond, Virginia
- Technimatric Inc. Collection, New York, New York
- Security Pacific National Bank Collection, New York, New York
- Confluence Collection, New York, New York
- Lawrence Ruben Co. Collection, New York, New York
- Vesti Cooperation Collection, Boston Massachusetts
- Hong Kong Museum of Art, Hong Kong
- Eslite Collection, Taipei, Taiwan
- Taipei Fine Arts Museum, Taipei, Taiwan
- Taiwan Fine Arts Museum, Taichung, Taiwan
