= Taiwanese art =

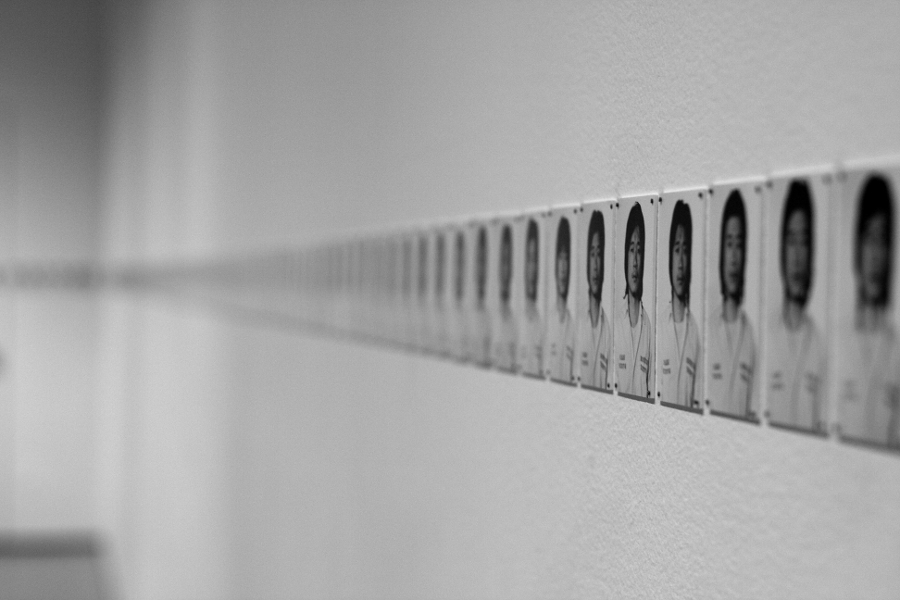
Tehching Hsieh’s exhibition One Year Performance 1978–1979 at MoMA, 2009

The artistic heritage of Taiwan is extremely diverse with multiple major influences and periods. Traditionally most arts were practiced for religious or ceremonial purposes. Art was first formalized under the Japanese but did not flourish until the democratic period. Art collecting has a long history in Taiwan and today Taiwan is one of the world's most significant art markets.

The performing arts have a strong history in Taiwan, especially theater, opera, music, and glove puppetry. The National Kaohsiung Center for the Arts is the world's largest performing arts center.

== History ==
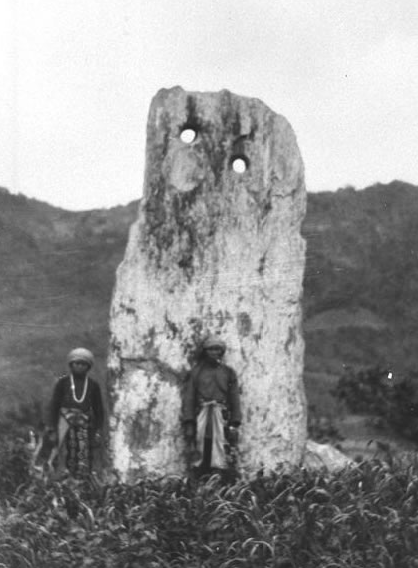
Monolith from the Beinan culture

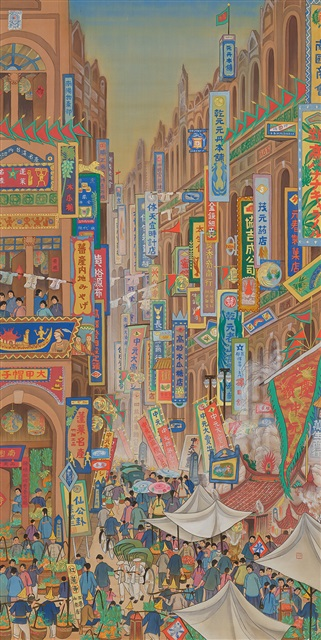
Kueh Suat-ôo's Festival on South Street (1930)

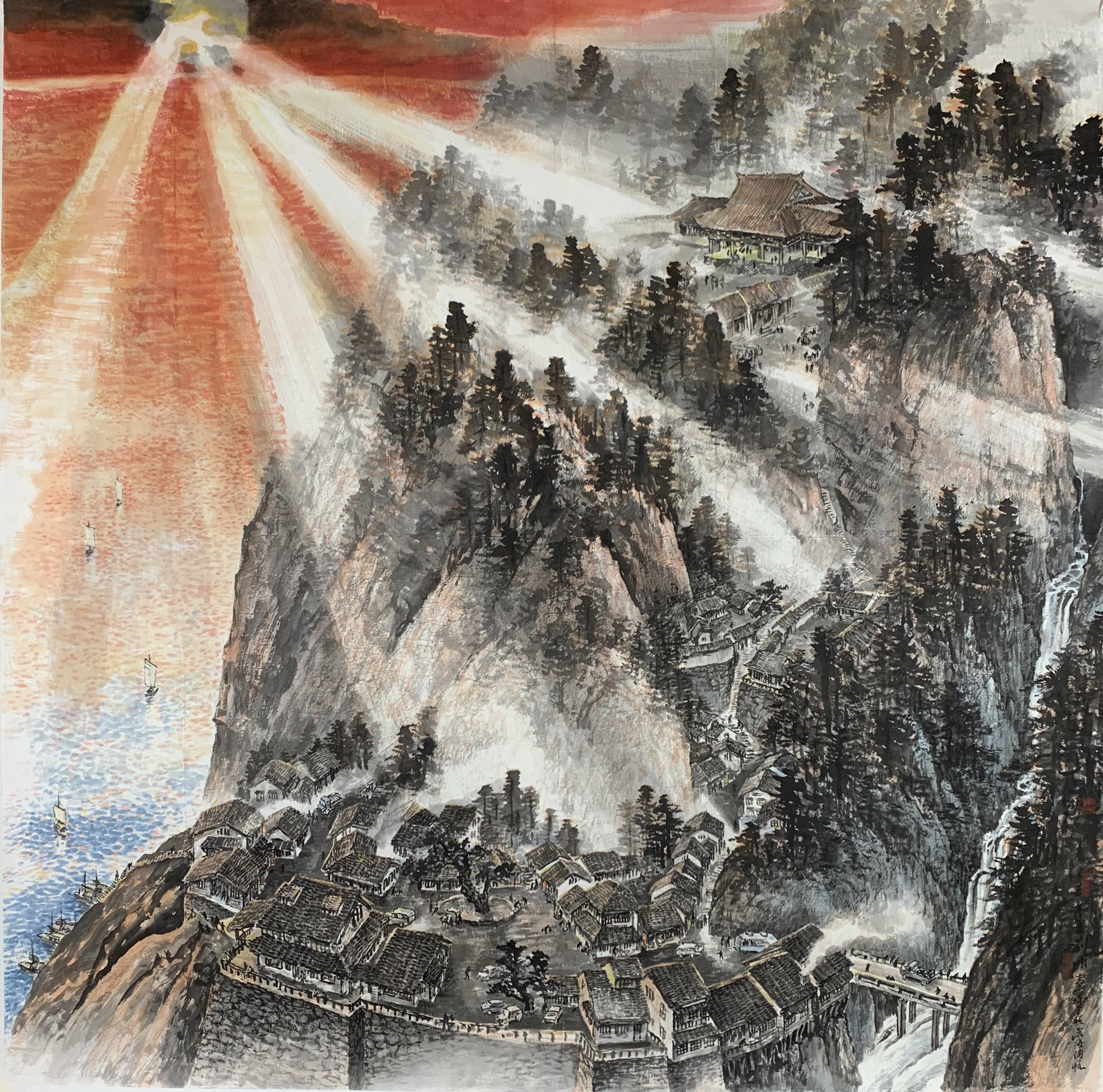
Liu Yong's The Setting Sun Shines on the Mountain Village (2019)

Stonecutters of the Changbin culture began to make art in Taiwan at least 30,000 years ago. Around 5,000 years ago jade and earthenware works started to appear. Between 4000 BC and 2000 BC people in what is now Hualien produced and traded valuable jade ornaments and jewelry. The Dapenkeng culture developed a unique style of pottery. For centuries much of the art produced was religious with highly decorated temples being the beneficiaries of local wealth and education.

Art was first institutionalized in Taiwan during the Japanese rule period with the establishment of public schools dedicated to the fine arts. The Japanese introduced oil and watercolor paintings to Taiwan and Taiwanese artists were heavily influenced by their Japanese counterparts. As was typical of colonial rulers the Japanese did not establish tertiary institutions for art education in Taiwan, all students wishing to pursue an advanced degree in the arts had to travel to Japan to do so.

In the 1920s the New Cultural Movement influenced a generation of artists who used art as a way to demonstrate their equality with, or even their superiority over, their colonizers.

When the Nationalists fled to Taiwan in 1949 they brought many of China’s most prestigious artists and a large portion of the former Qing Imperial art collection with them. The artists Huang Chun-pi, Pu Ru, and Chang Dai-chien who all came to Taiwan during this period are collectively known as the “three masters from across the strait.” The Nationalists also established the first art colleges and universities in Taiwan. Along with Chinese influences the Nationalists also allowed the United States to establish a series of military bases in Taiwan, American pop culture and artistic ideas such as abstract expressionism were introduced to Taiwan by the Americans. Schools such as the May Art Association, a revolutionary art group, and Eastern Art Association, an avant-garde group flourished during this time. The Ton-Fan group, founded in Taipei in 1956 by eight artists, brought abstraction to Taiwan. The Ton-Fan group reacted to Government disapproval of avant-garde art by championing it.

The next major influence came when the ROC left the United Nations in 1971, this unmooring from the international community caused artists to search for an identity and a sense of self, a search which continues up to the present. Artists of this era such as Lee Shi-chi and Shiy De-jinn adopted Taiwanese folk motifs and other elements from Taiwan’s traditional culture however the Taiwanese art scene still chafed under the KMT’s military dictatorship.

Democratization in the late 1980s and the lifting of martial law granted Taiwanese artists freedom of expression for the first time in history. The end of military rule allowed the Taiwanese to access films, literature, philosophy and culture from abroad which had been denied to them or censored. Artists and activists began to grapple with the legacy of authoritarianism and embraced things like queer culture which had been oppressed under the dictatorship. The economic boom of the '80s and ‘90s also saw the financial resources of Taiwanese museums and patrons increase significantly. As Taiwan’s art scene matured there began to be a greater specialization in exhibit spaces with dedicated museums for things like photography and ceramics opening.

Many contemporary Taiwanese artists grapple with issues of globalization in their work. LGBTQ artists in modern Taiwan enjoy a degree of freedom denied in other Asian countries. This has made Taiwan a haven and a hub for both domestic and international LGBTQ artists. Its freedoms have also made it a safe haven for artists like Kacey Wong fleeing an increasingly oppressive environment in Hong Kong.

Taiwan's position at the forefront of the global electronics industry has led many artists and collectors to embrace the cutting edge of digital art and the use of electronics technology in art.

== Art market ==
Art collecting has a long tradition in Taiwan however most important and deep-pocketed Taiwanese collectors prefer to fly under the radar. Taiwanese collectors are significant buyers of Chinese contemporary art as well as antiquities. Both Sotheby’s and Christie’s routinely tour the highlights of their spring and autumn Impressionist and Modern and postwar sales in Taipei. Taiwanese collectors have significant presence both at home and abroad, Taiwanese billionaire collector Pierre Chen is auction house Sotheby’s go-to guarantor for big-ticket items. Taiwanese-German collector Maria Chen-Tu is one of the largest collectors of German art and is also active in Taiwan. In 2019 more than three hundred million dollars' worth of artwork that she had loaned for exhibition in China went missing.

The strong modern Taiwanese art market came about as a result of the economic boom which followed the end of martial law in Taiwan in 1987. By 1990 the Taiwanese art market was the biggest in Asia and served as a regional hub. By 2000 Hong Kong and Taiwan held comparable shares of the market. In 2006 Tamsui, an oil painting by Tan Ting-pho, was purchased in 2006 for $4.5 million (NT$144 million), setting a world record for an oil painting by an ethnically Chinese artist. In the 21st century while no longer the largest art market in Asia (having been surpassed by China) the tastes of Taiwan’s collectors have matured and Taiwan remains the most cutting-edge art market in Asia. After 2010 the art collecting market underwent significant diversification with a large number of young buyers entering the market and driving trends. In 2019 art sales in Taiwan stood at $225.4 million. The art market in Taiwan is centered in Taipei which remains an Asian leading art hub. During the COVID-19 crisis the deep pool of collectors in Taipei helped the art market sustain itself. Taiwanese collectors have become more willing to publicly exhibit their art but remain much more private than collectors in China and South Korea.

Taiwanese art, especially contemporary Taiwanese art, is seen as highly collectable and there is significant international demand for it. The Taiwanese government has worked to support domestic artists on the international stage.

=== Jade ===
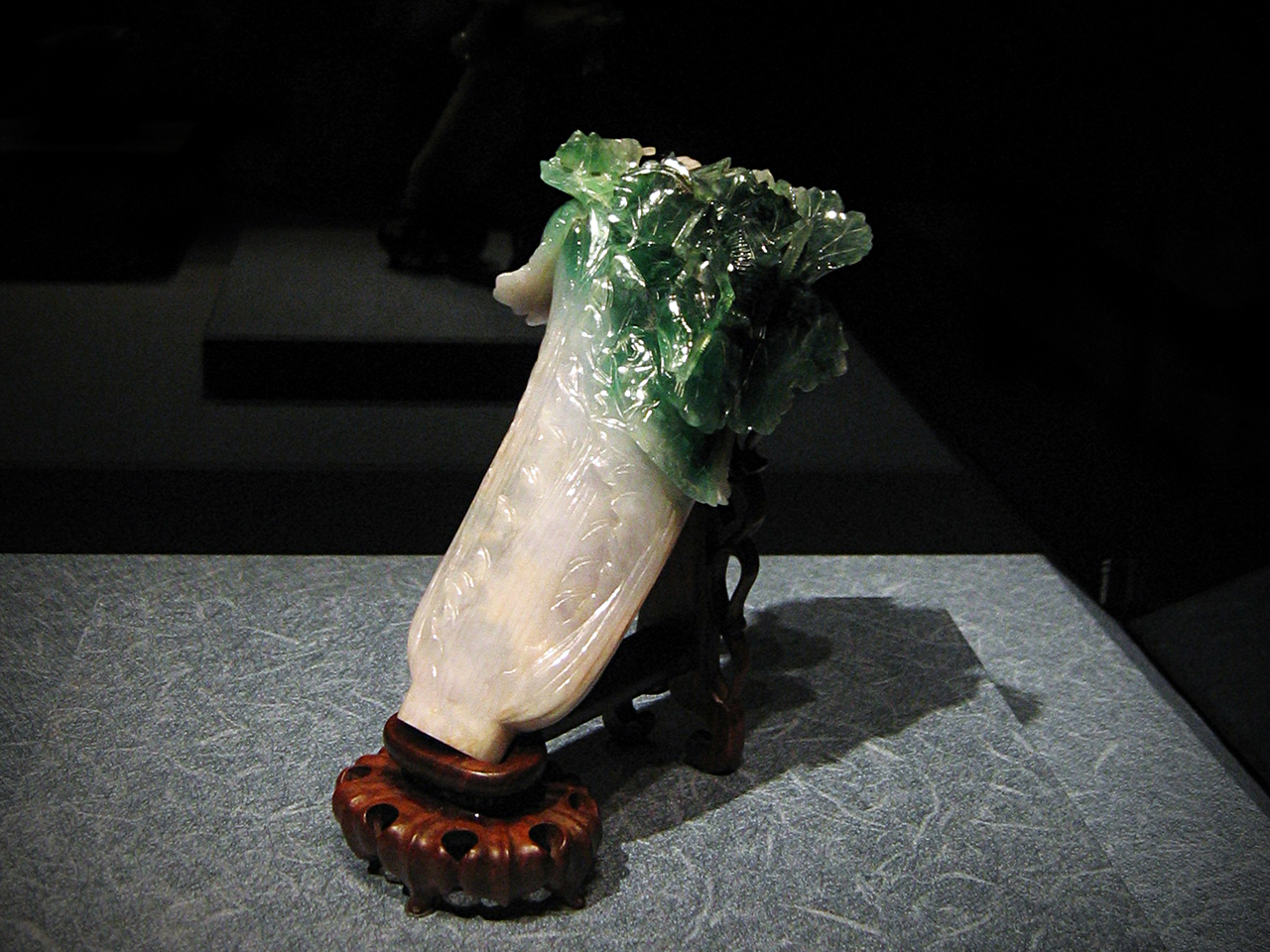
The Jade Cabbage which was brought to Taiwan by the retreating Nationalists

After the KMT retreat to Taiwan the market for jade objects was significant due to the large amount of jade objects that the civilians, soldiers, and KMT leaders fleeing China brought with them. After the opening of trade relations between Taiwan and China the market became very strong with a high interest from Chinese collectors in high end pieces which could not be found in China outside of museums but in Taiwan could be found in numerous private collections. This market tapered off in the 2020s with the worsening of relations between Taiwan and China and the unrest in Hong Kong (the other major jade market). The perfusion of counterfeits through all levels of the market has also hurt the overall value and demand for jade.

== Wood carving ==
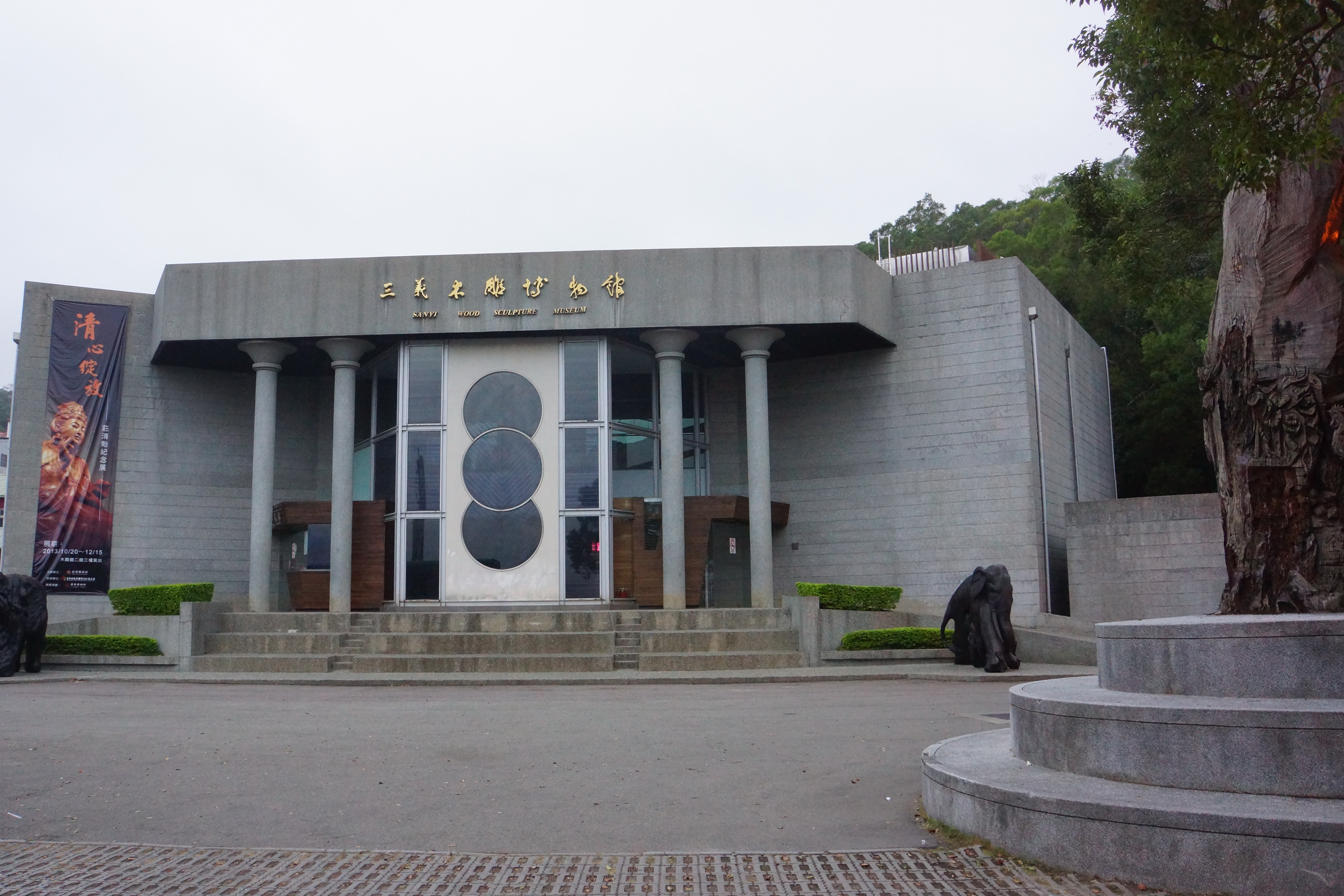
Sanyi Wood Sculpture Museum

Wood carving has a long history on Taiwan. After the deforestation of much of Taiwan’s camphor forests a local industry emerged of excavating and then carving the remaining tree stumps.

The town of Sanyi, Miaoli is the current center of the Taiwanese wood carving industry. Many of the wood carvers in Sanyi are concentrated on Shuimei Street. The Sanyi Wood Sculpture Museum exhibits a wide range of wood art.

Much of the timber from illegal logging in Taiwan ends up in the local wood carving industry. Cheap pieces which imitate Taiwanese masters are imported from China and Southeast Asia which cuts into the local industry. Wood art made in Taiwan can be issued a certification from the Taiwan Wood-carving Association.

== Calligraphy ==
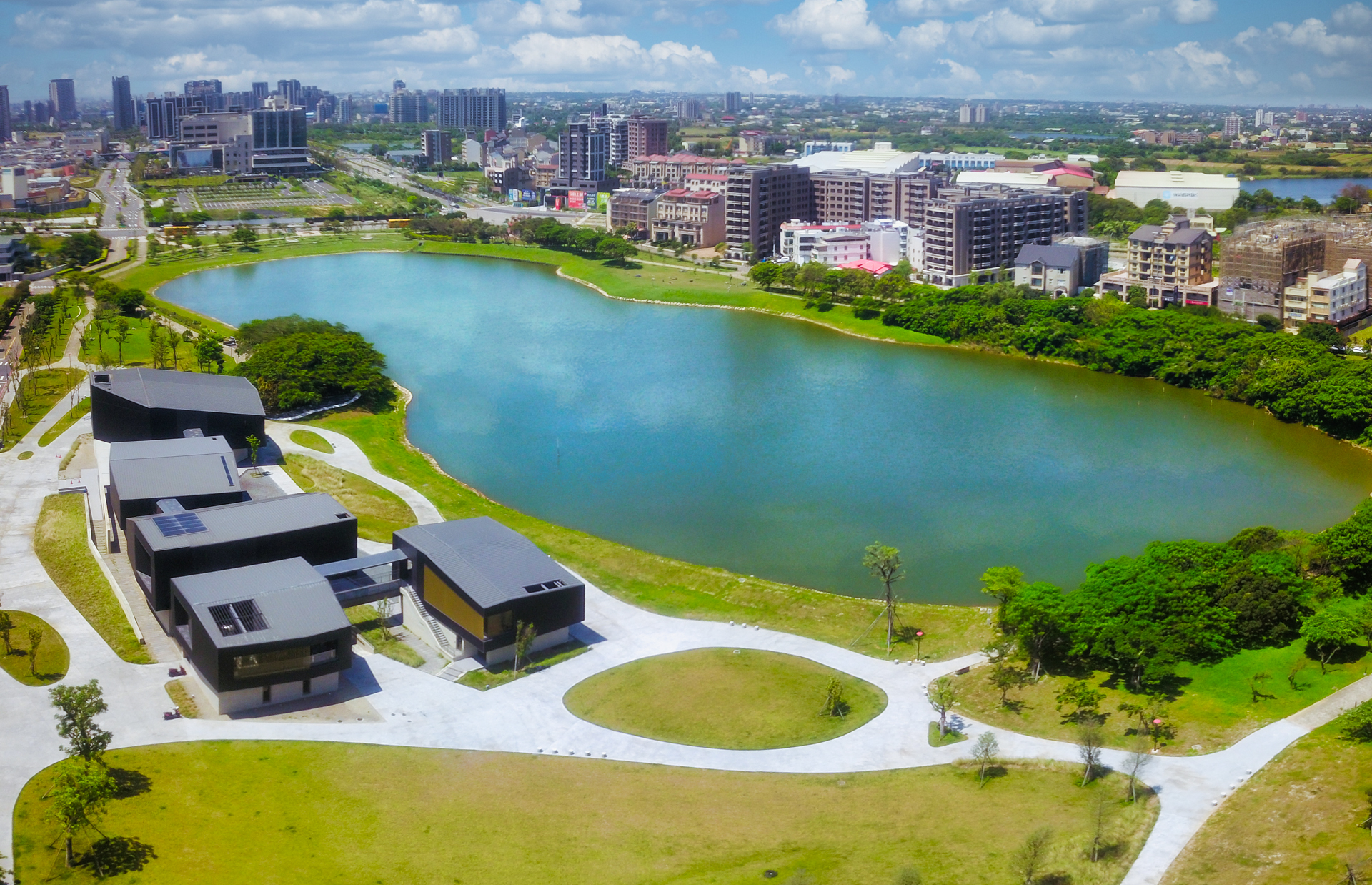
Hengshan Calligraphy Art Center

Taiwanese calligraphy reflects a rich cultural fusion, shaped by ancient Chinese and Qing dynasty, when many mainland calligraphers migrated to Taiwan and spread Chinese artistic calligraphy to the island . Moreover, it was influenced by Japanese calligraphers during Japanese rule. Under the Japanese rule period (1895-1945), the Taiwanese had significant influence from Western education and Japanese calligraphic educators, contributing to the change from the standard traditional Chinese calligraphy. In 1927, a new art movement began with the establishment of “Taiwan Fine Art Exhibition”, promoting the blending of new Western and Japanese techniques in painting, specifically in the ink landscape painting.

In addition, since 1980, Taiwanese calligraphers have been influenced by various sources, including contemporary Japanese and Korean calligraphy, as well as Western postmodern and abstract art. These diverse influences have left a significant mark on the evolution of Taiwanese calligraphy.

Today, contemporary Taiwanese calligraphers actively merge traditional spirit with personal experiences to innovate and create new forms of calligraphic art. Their aim is to transcend the barriers of traditional calligraphy, contributing in a dynamic and evolving art form, such as collabing calligraphy in two or three-dimensional art works. For example, modern calligraphy develops into a painting-like pattern with vibrant ink colours, coloured calligraphy, and creatively coloured paper, making the art form more visually appealing and diverse.

Other examples of three-dimensional work arts can be illustrated by the integration of architecture, interior design and Chinese calligraphy of calligraphy artist Tong Yang-tze (董陽孜) and Taiwanese architect Ray Chen (陳瑞憲) in their exhibition “A Realm of Feelings: A Dialogue of Calligraphy and Space” in a Contemporary Exhibition of Calligraphy at the Taipei Fine Arts Museum in December, 2014. This collaboration demonstrates the effort to renew the way of displacing traditional Chinese calligraphy in the contemporary Taiwanese art world.

Furthermore, calligraphy artist Tong Yang-tze also created the logo of the world-renowned Cloud Gate Dance Theatre, called “yun men wu ji”, which refers to a now lost form of ancient Chinese dance. Cloud Gate is famous for its Cursive dance in which the dancer plays a role of a “huge writing brush” writing calligraphy on stage. In September 2023, the Cursive trilogy was presented for the first time at the National Theater in Taipei.

In 2021, The Hengshan Calligraphy Art Center (HCAC) - the first public calligraphy-themed art center was established as a branch of the Taoyuan Museum of Fine Arts. In undertaking the responsibility of preserving and studying traditional Chinese calligraphy, HCAC will also be a promoting base for developing Taiwanese calligraphy art.

== Religious art ==
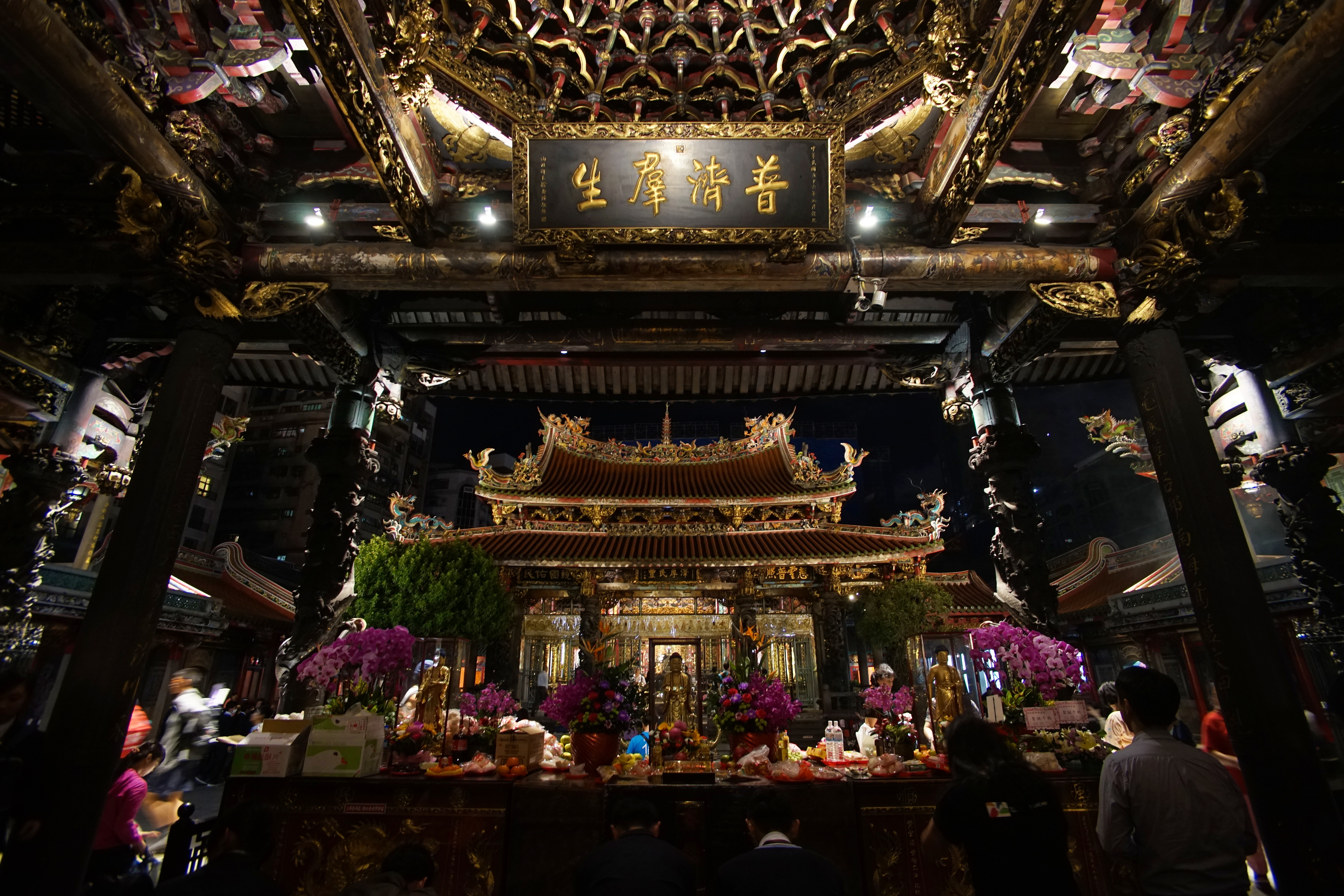
carvings on the Bangka Lungshan Temple

Taiwan’s traditional temples are home to unique artwork which represents the height of art for its time. Much of the wealth in traditional Taiwanese society went into buying and decorating temples and tombs. In particular the doors of Buddhist and Taoist temples are often exquisitely carved and painted with many in Taiwan depicting Guan Yu. These traditional temples have often been damaged by years of smoke from burning incense and joss paper, as a result they often require costly restoration work. Religious architecture has also had to adapt to modern materials with concrete often replacing wood for structural components in typhoon prone areas.

Many of Taiwan’s traditional tombs are carved from stone with generations of artisans from stone crafting villages in Huian County, Fujian traveling to Taiwan to build tombs and temples. Chiang Hsin was the most famous of these artisans. The esteemed Yeh family of Penghu have been temple architects and carpenters since the 1600s.

== Indigenous art ==
Indigenous art in Taiwan reflects the history, identity, and traditions of the island's indigenous people. Taiwan is shaped by 16 recognized indigenous tribes. The recognized tribes, including the Amis, Atayal, Bunun, Paiwan, and Rukai, contribute to the development of indigenous art in Taiwan.

=== History ===
During Taiwan’s prehistoric period, Taiwan was a home for indigenous people of the Austronesian language family. According to ethnologists, Taiwan’s indigenous people came in waves during different periods and through different routes from the south with the help of ocean currents and seasonal winds. Since 1940’s, Taiwan indigenous people from the 17th century have governed the island. Indigenous artists began to develop when the Kuomintang (KMT) started to lose its power in 1949. After the end of single party rule indigenous Taiwanese artists and groups began exploring and rediscovering their cultural heritage, this revival also led to a larger social embrace of indigenous culture. In the 21st century Taiwan’s artistic community embraced new technologies and new mediums. The Taiwanese government has begun to champion and highlight Aboriginal art. An indigenous artist is selected to represent Taiwan for the first time at the Venice Biennale in 2021.

=== Art forms ===
Taiwan's indigenous art finds expression in various forms including weaving, pottery, carving, music, etc. The Lan Yang Museum and the Taitung Taiwan History Pre-Cultural Museum offer insights into these expressions, with specific tribes, like the Paiwan and Rukai, standing out for their embroidery. The preservation and exhibition of these artefacts not only celebrate their appeal but also contribute to the understanding of indigenous social structures and traditions.

In 1990, wood carving arts started developing for Taiwan’s indigenous people. Each indigenous tribe had different kinds of techniques. The Paiwan tribe in the south, the Tao tribe in Lanyu and the Kavalan tribe in the Lanyang Plain were most known for their wood carving arts, especially the Paiwan tribe who was known as one of the most artistic tribes. Most of the Paiwan tribal carvings were made out of wood or stone. Wood carvings mostly came from the houses of the noblemen, with items as small as smoke pipes, spoons, cups, combs, wooden boxes, fortune telling box, dolls, sawing boards, gunpowder holders, knives, spears, wooden shields, staffs, bells, etc. The patterns they used were limited but the varieties were not. Besides the Paiwan tribe, the Tao tribe also plays a huge part for wood carving arts, “The Lanyu Wooden Boat” as its classic indigenous artwork.

Weaving was considered an important necessity for the daily life of Taiwan’s indigenous tribes during the prehistoric period. The main material the tribe used to make woven baskets was either bamboo or vine which was an ideal material for use in hot and humid climates. Depending on the size of the basket, it was used as a container or to transport items.

Pottery kettle was called “Reretan” in the Paiwan language. It was used as a daily necessity or sacrificial rites in the prehistoric era. There were four types of pottery kettles of the leading ancestors—yin-yang kettle, female kettle, male kettle, and human-form kettle. However, the pottery technique of the Paiwan tribe was lost and it was handed down from the ancestors of the Paiwan.

Music is an essential aspect of indigenous art. Using instruments such as the mouth organ, bowed string instrument, mouth whistle, nose flute, and wooden clapper being prominent. Sometimes, music is accompanied by the rhythmic sounds of bamboo tubes. The histories, cultures, and traditions of these tribes contribute to the cultural diversity of Taiwan, with indigenous peoples serving as precious guardians of this heritage.

In the face of modernity, Taiwan's indigenous art confronts challenges such as a dwindling number of successors, declining artist numbers. Yet, it remains a crucial aspect of the island's cultural richness and diversity.

== Performing arts ==
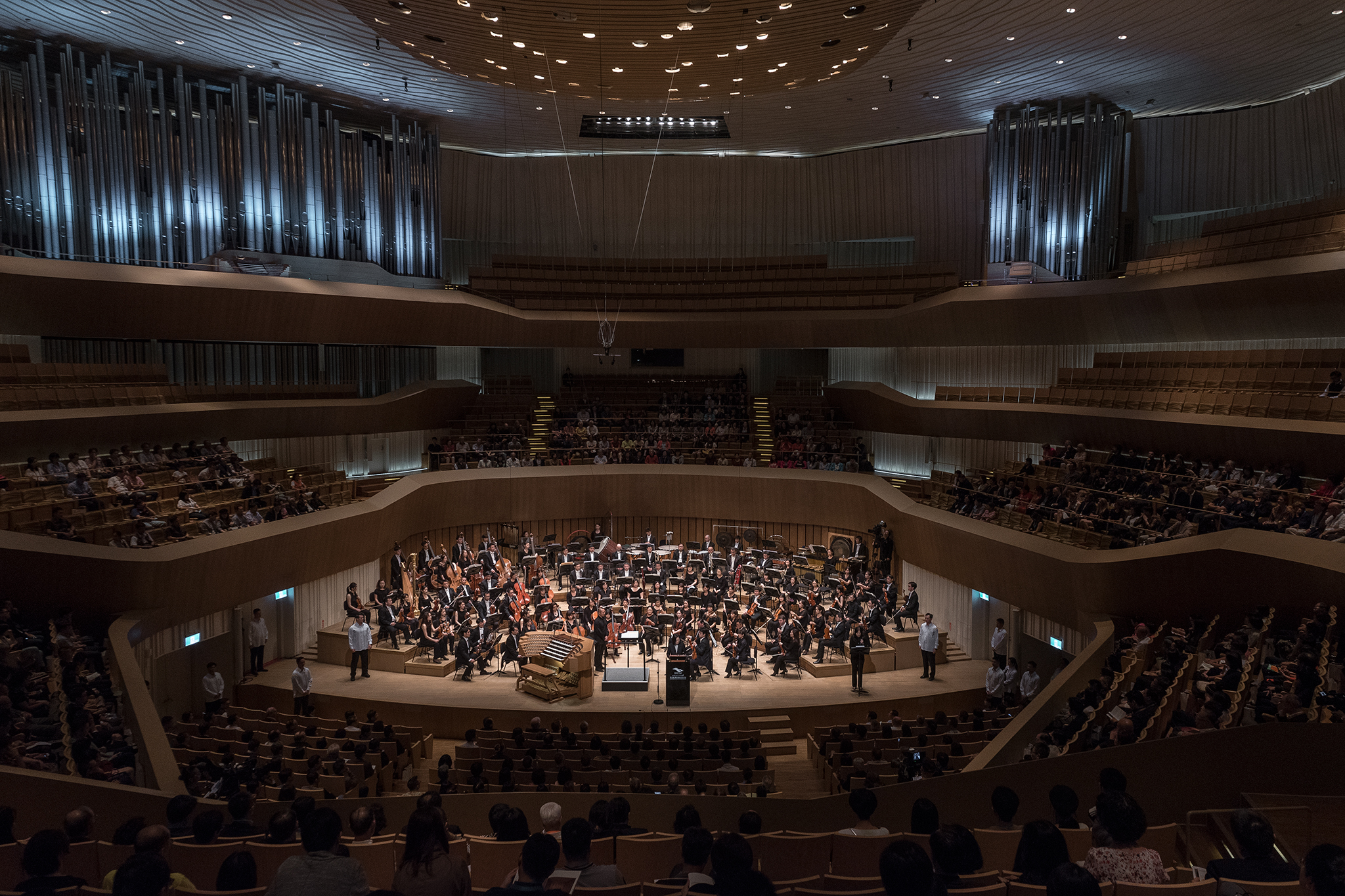
Pipe organ of National Kaohsiung Center for the Arts, the largest performing arts center in the world

The Taiwanese government believes that "A country’s level of democracy is reflected in the development of its performing arts."

Completed in 2018 National Kaohsiung Center for the Arts is the largest performing arts center in the world. The more popular music oriented Kaohsiung Music Center opened in 2021.

=== Glove puppetry ===
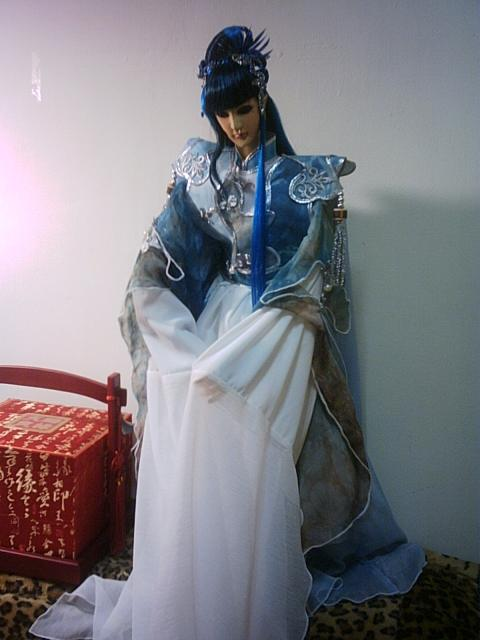
A modern style of puppet in Taiwan glove puppetry.

Glove puppetry in Taiwan has its origin in traditional Chinese glove puppetry, which was brought over to Taiwan by Chinese immigrants in the 17th century. Yet, it also established itself in a distinct contemporary style unique to Taiwan. Pili International Multimedia, is famous for its TV puppet show of the same name Pili (also known as Thunderbolt), whose contemporary Taiwanese puppets, from 1993 on, are typically larger and more lifelike than their traditional counterparts. Puppets are designed to look more lifelike and realistic, most famously the character Su Huan-Jen, who is crafted from heavy cloth, real hair and glass eyeballs. Because of the increased delicacy and detail in character design, the puppets attract their own fanbase, transforming them into idols and forming relationships with these puppets. There has also been a change from the six stereotypical role depictions in traditional Chinese glove puppetry, Sheng [生] (the male role), Dan [旦] (female role), Jing [淨] (painted face and vivid personality), Mo [末] (older man), Chou [丑] (clown), and Za [雜] (monster), to more developed and diverse personas beyond simple archetypes for puppets in shows. Taiwanese Pili Puppetry also ventures into more contemporary spaces such as Animation with 3D puppetry, wherein the puppets are partially animated, in a way similar to Stop Motion filmmaking. Due to the increased size of the puppets, puppeteers have to adjust their technique, opting to use two hands for the performance instead of the traditional one-hand use.

=== Cosplay and fanart ===
Cosplay became popular in Taiwan around the late 80s, and is a form of costuming, mostly as characters found in Japanese manga or anime. At anime and comic conventions, fans engage in art forms such as cosplay and fanart of their favourite media, which mostly consists of anime, manga, and video games. In addition, cosplays of Taiwanese rock artists and traditional puppetry are also popular in the Taiwanese anime community. Being active in fan culture as a Doujinshi artist, which is a creator of fan-made manga, often derived of their favourite media, or cosplayer, can be immensely time-consuming, but it is highly valued in the community. Good artists are treated similarly to professional artists and performers. cosplay involves not only the artistry behind making the costume and accessories, often made from scratch by hand, but also the performance aspect behind portraying a character, which has many similarities with stage dramas. The most popular convention in Taiwan is ComicWorld, a two-day long event, which, starting from 1997, is regularly held around February and December in big cities in Taiwan such as Kaohsiung, Taichung or Taipei.

=== Dance ===
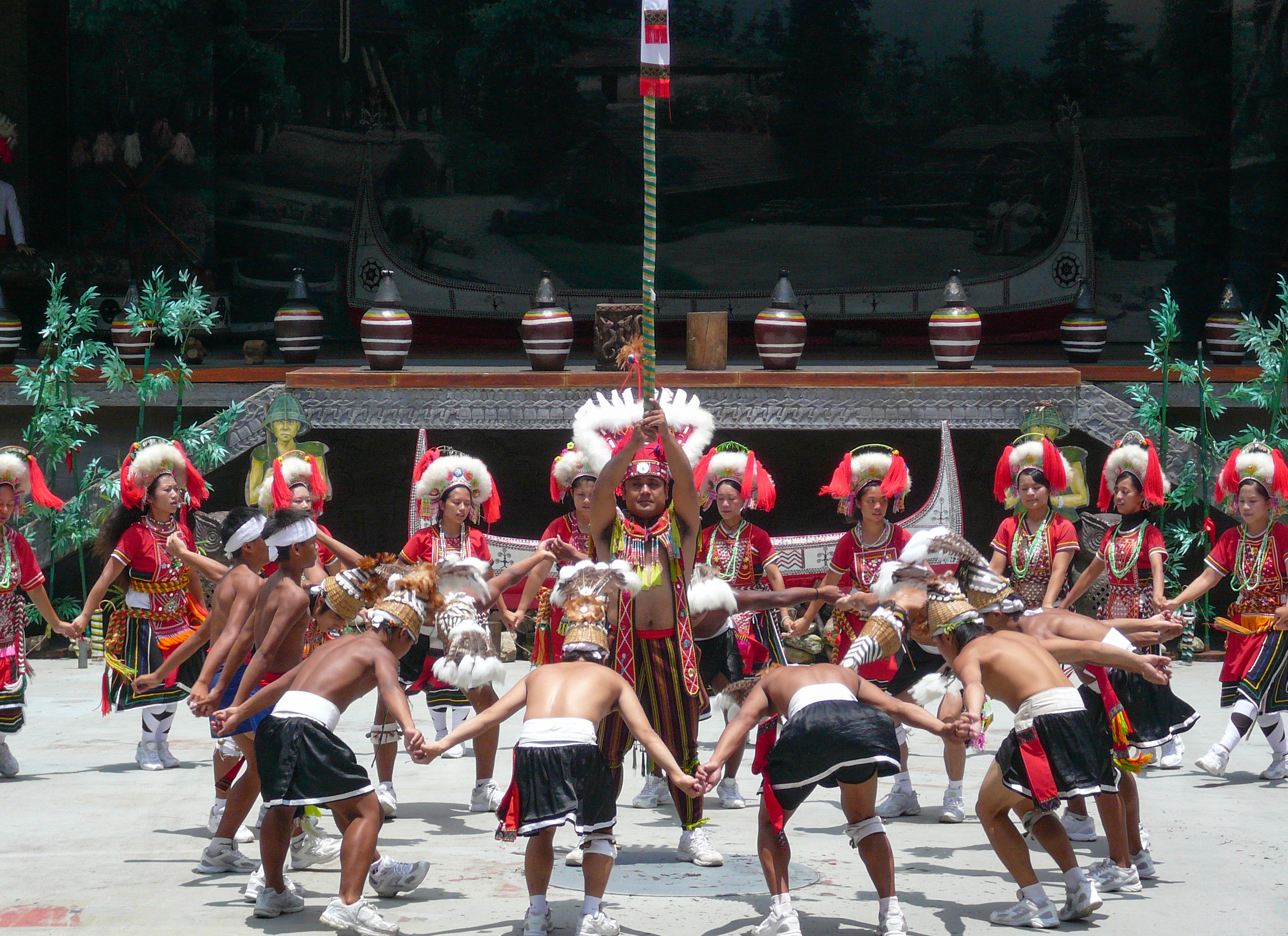
Amis people of Taiwan performing a traditional dance.

Located between China, South Korea, Japan, and several island countries of Southeast Asia, Taiwan is situated at the junction of maritime traffic connecting Indo-Pacific countries. The earliest human activity on the island dated back to the Paleolithic Changbin culture in Taitung County. Taiwan then experienced the Dutch Formosa period (1624–1662), the Kingdom of Tungning (1661–1683), the Japanese rule (1895–1945), and the current period starting with the Nationalist government's move to Taiwan in 1949. With the human body as its primary medium of expression, dance is inextricably linked to the activities of different ethnic groups. Influenced by Taiwan's geographical location and historical background, the establishment and evolution of dance forms are closely connected to the political, economic, social, and cultural factors in every period.

=== Music ===
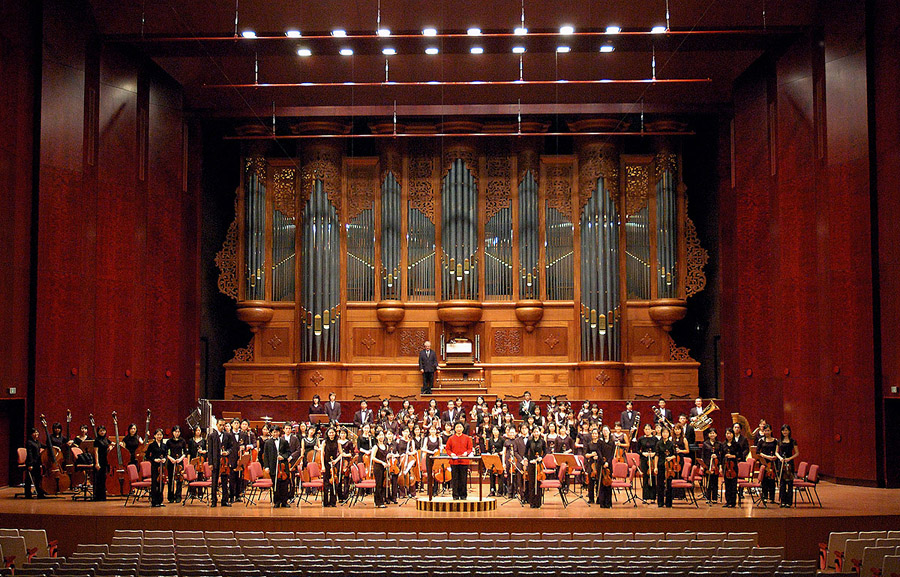
Apo Hsu and the NTNU Symphony Orchestra on stage in the National Concert Hall in Taipei

The music of Taiwan reflects the diverse culture of Taiwanese people. Taiwan has undergone several economic, social, and political changes through its cultural history, and Taiwanese music reflects those issues in its way. The music of the country has adopted a mixed style. As a country rich in Chinese folk culture and with many indigenous tribes with their own distinct artistic identity, various folk music styles are appreciated in Taiwan. In addition, people in Taiwan highly appreciate various style of Western classical music and pop music. Taiwan is a major Mandopop hub.

=== Taiwanese opera ===
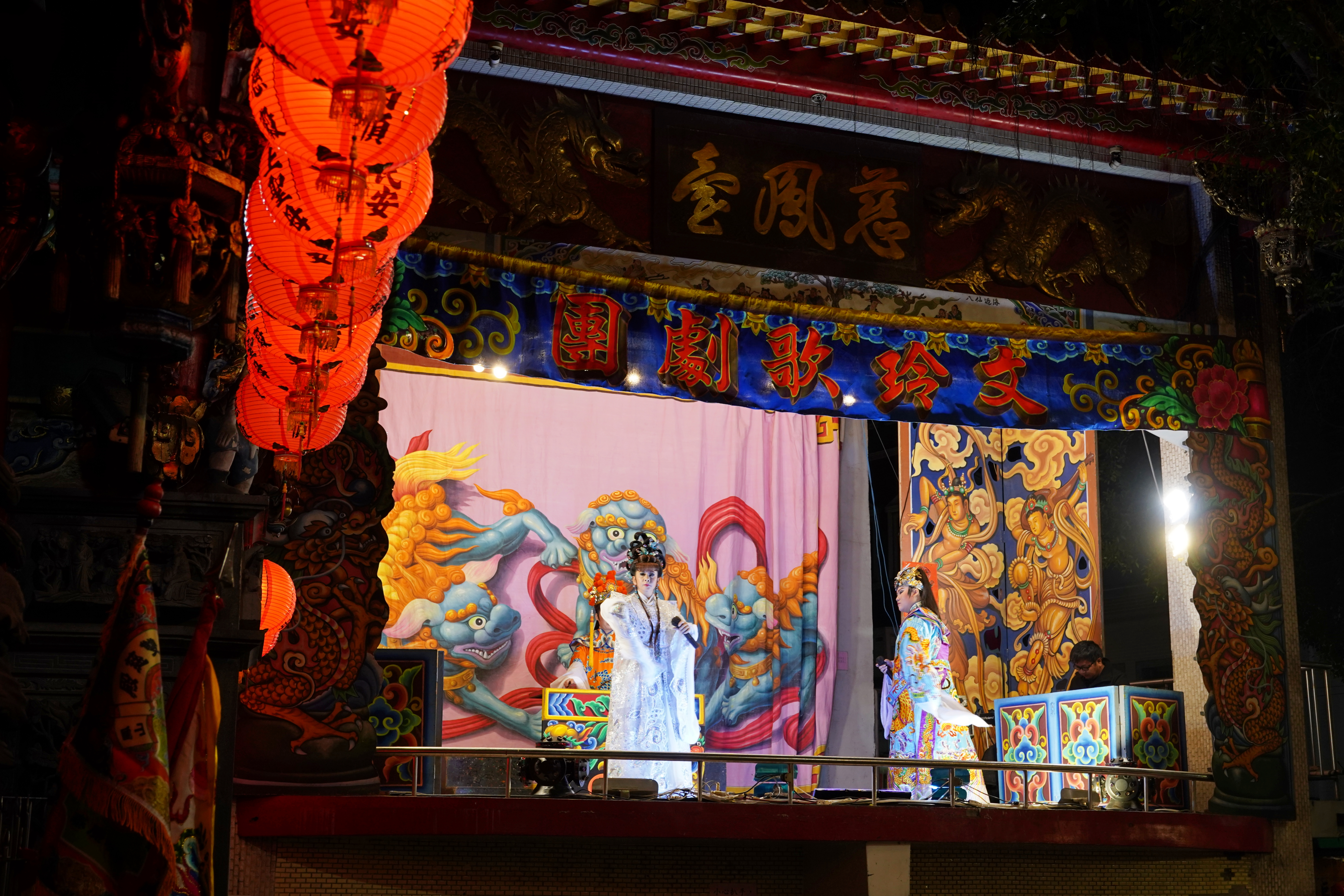
A Taiwanese opera group performing at Mazu temple

Taiwanese opera (Chinese: 歌仔戲; pinyin: gēzǎixì; Pe̍h-ōe-jī: koa-á-hì; lit. 'Song Drama'), commonly known as Ke-Tse opera or Hokkien opera, is a form of traditional drama originating in Taiwan. Taiwanese opera uses a stylised combination of both the literary and colloquial registers of Taiwanese Hokkien. Its earliest form adopted elements of folk songs from Zhangzhou, Fujian, China. The plots are traditionally drawn from folk tales of the southern Fujian region and Chinese historical legends stories, though in recent years stories are increasingly set in Taiwan itself. Taiwanese opera was later exported to other Hokkien-speaking areas, such as Singapore, Malaysia, the Philippines, and Fujian, China.

Taiwanese opera is considered as the embodiment of Taiwanese history and tradition because the political identity crisis of Taiwan shaped its development.

=== Taiwanese drama ===
Taiwanese drama (Chinese: 台灣電視劇; pinyin: Táiwān Diànshìjù, also known as T.W. drama) refer to dramatic programming of television programming extended stories usually dramatizing relationships through the general range of ten to forty one-hour episodes. They are produced in Taiwan and have gained increasing popularity in the Mandarin-speaking community internationally. The term "Taiwanese drama" is applied to Taiwanese miniseries in general, even including those with greater elements of comedy than of drama.

== Street art ==
Street Art can be found in Taiwan since the 1990’s. Some of the most famous places to view street art in Taipei are Ximending, Treasure Hill Artists Village, and American Street. Notably, in some of these “artists villages,” such as Rainbow Village in Taichung or Ruan Chiao Village in Hsinchu, the seniors become graffiti artists to attract younger generations and tourists, by turning their houses and villages into street art.

One research (2008) states that most of the street graffiti artists in Taiwan come from middle class families, and many have been recognized for their artistic talents since childhood, whose motivation does not come from confrontation to solve class or racial conflicts. Instead, they want to determine their ability and identity, make themselves visible to society, and challenge the social expectation of a successful and respectful life. Likewise, graffiti in Taiwan also reflects the changing psychological orientation of youths, from aligning with the social desire to self-expression or self-realisation. On the one hand, expressing the self through graffiti artwork affirms that their identities belong to specific communities (graffiti artists). On the other hand, by choosing graffiti as a means to realise themselves, they show attitudes opposed to the model successful path in Taiwanese society focusing on academic achievement.

Notable Taiwanese street art and graffiti artists include:

- Fu Hsing-han (傅星翰), better known as VASTAR. Some of his art can be viewed around Ximending or on his Instagram @vastar.art.
- Candybird, found under @candybbird on Instagram, whose art can be found all over Taipei. In 2018 from the 10 to 30 November, he also held an exhibition in the Xingzhe Art Salon in Taipei called "20,000 Ways to Die in Yau Ma Tei" (油麻地的兩萬種死法).

== See also ==
- List of Taiwanese artists
- Japanese art
- Chinese art
- American art
- Eslite Gallery
- Fashion in Taiwan
- Ye Wang cochin ware cultural museum
