= Liu Guosong =

Chinese artist (born 1932)

Liu Guosong (Liu Kuo-sung) 劉國松
- Born: 26 April 1932 (age 94); Bangbu, Anhui, China
- Known for: Painter

Liu Kuo-sung (Liu Guosong) (simplified Chinese: 刘国松; traditional Chinese: 劉國松; pinyin: Liu Guosong; born 26 April 1932) is a Chinese artist based in Taipei, Taiwan. Liu is widely regarded as one of the earliest and most important advocates and practitioners of modernist Chinese painting. He is also a writer on contemporary Chinese art.

== Sources ==
- Lee Chun-yi. Universe in the Mind: Liu Guosong's Art and Thoughts. Hong Kong: University Museum and Art Gallery, University of Hong Kong, 2009.
- Beijing Palace Museum ed. The Universe in the Mind: 60 Years of Painting by Liu Guosong. Beijing: Forbidden City Publishing House, 2007.
- Lin Mu. The Road of Liu Guosong's Modern Chinese Painting. Chengdu: Sichuan Fine Art Publishing House, 2007.
- Hong Kong Museum of Art ed. A Universe of His Own. Hong Kong: Leisure and Cultural Services Department, 2004.
- Lee Chun-yi ed. Liu Guosong on Art. Changsha: Henan Fine Art Publishing House, 2002.
- Xiao Qiongrui and Lin Boxin. Anthology of Taiwan Critical Writing: Volume of Liu Guosong. Taipei: Artists Publishing, 1999.
- Lee Chun-yi ed. Selected Essays on Liu Guosong's Art. Taipei: National Museum of History, 1996.
- Xiao Qiongrui. Research on Liu Guosong. Taipei: National Museum of History, 1996.
- Taiwan Museum of Art. The Retrospective of 60-Year-Old Liu Kuo-sung. Taichung: Taiwan Museum of Art, 1992.
- Zhou Shaohua. The Construction of Liu Guosong's Art. Wuhan: Hubei Fine Art Publishing House, 1985.
- Moss, Hugh M. The Four Seasons Handscroll by Liu Guosong. Hong Kong: Andamans East International, 1985.
- Li, Chu-tsing. Liu Kuo-sung: The Growth of a Modern Chinese Artist. Taipei: National Gallery of Art and History Museum, 1969.
- Liu Guosong. The Road to Modern Chinese Painting. Taipei: Wen Hsing Bookstore, 1969.
- Liu Guosong. Copy, Realism, Creation. Taipei: Wen Hsing Bookstore, 1966.

== See also ==
- Taiwanese art
