= Lu Tie-Zhou =

Taiwanese painter

- Lū Thiat-chiu
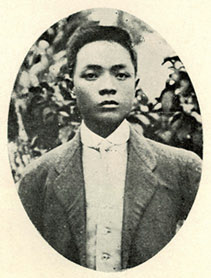
- 呂鐵州
- Born: June 17, 1899; Daxi, Taoyuan, Japanese-occupied Taiwan
- Died: September 24, 1942 (aged 43); Japanese-occupied Taiwan
- Citizenship: Japan
- Occupation: Painter

Lu Tie-Zhou (Chinese: 呂鐵州; 17 June 1899－24 September 1942), originally named Lu Teng-Chu and a native of Daxi, Taoyuan, was a painter in Taiwan under Japanese rule. He belonged to the Maruyama-Shijō school at Kyoto City Technical School of Painting (now Kyoto City University of Arts). Traditional ink wash paintings were the staple of his works. He was known for flower-and-bird paintings after pursuing advanced training in Japan. Plants, flowers, birds and other animals arose frequently as the subjects of his works, presenting a sense of idealized order with superbly created compositions and other aesthetic qualities. He was also known as "Taiten's guru".

== Life ==
Lu Tie-Zhou was born on 17 June 1899 in Daxi, Taoyuan. Growing up, Lu was of wealthy origin, and his father Lu Ying-Yang liked to hang out with local literati. Therefore, by learning through social osmosis, Lu gradually became interested in traditional literature, calligraphy, and ink wash painting. After his father's death in the mid-1920s, Lu moved to Taiheichō in the suburbs of Taihoku and opened an embroidery shop there. He refined his painting skills by drawing flowers and birds for clients and by copying the landscape, flower-and-bird, and figure paintings by famous Chinese artists of the Ming and Qing dynasties and modern times, hence his great competence in calligraphy and painting.

Lu Tie-Zhou experienced a setback in his mid-career period. In 1927, the Taiwan Education Association, a front organization of the Government-General of Taiwan's Department of Education, held the first official Taiwan Arts Exhibition (also known as Taiten), formally introducing the new trends of modern art into Taiwan. However, Lu's painting style was traditional art, so his work was not favored by the jury and failed to be selected, which prompted Lu to go to Japan in 1928 and enroll at Kyoto City Technical School of Painting, the stronghold of the Maruyama-Shijō school. He also studied painting at the studio of Heihachirō Fukuda, who played a leading role in the modern flower-and-bird painting reform in Japan.

In 1929, Lu submitted his paintings Plum and Okra to the third Taiten, and both works were selected for the category of Eastern-style painting. His work Plum further won the laurels of Special Selection. However, Lu was forced to return to Taiwan in 1930 after merely two years of study due to his family's deteriorating financial situation. Lu continued to participate in the Taiten after his homecoming. His work Backyard earned him the Taiten Award in 1931, Shamo and Castor-oil Plant earned him the Special Selection and Taiten Award in 1932, and Southland also earned him the Taiten Award in 1933. Lu won awards in successive years, which brought him great fame. Journalist Lin Jinhong from the newspaper Taiwan New People even praised Lu as "a talent of the Eastern-style painting scene in Taiwan".

During the 1930s, a new trend of literati painting emerged in the Taiten. Therefore, Lu considered changing his creative style in the late stage of his career, and submitted his landscape sketching The Dahan River to the seventh Taiten in 1933. His attempt at evolving his creative subject, genre, technique, and style found expression in this work. Unfortunately, in the midst of his transformation, Lu fell ill from constant overwork that resulted in his cardiogenic sudden death on 24 September 1942.

== Related art events ==
In addition to creating works and participating in the Taiten, Lu Tie-Zhou engaged actively in the promotion of painting groups. In 1932, Lu joined the "Chinaberry Art Society" founded by Japanese painters Gobara Koto and Kinoshita Seigai. In 1933, Lu Tie-Zhou with Lin Yushan, Kuo Hsueh-hu and Chen Jing-Hui founded the "Li Guang Society". In 1935, Lu Tie-Zhou with Kuo Hsueh-hu, Chen Jing-Hui, Lin Jinhong, Yang San-lang, and Cao Qiupu founded the "Six Ink-stone Society", thereby continuing to organize arts education events.

Lu Tie-Zhou also contributed significantly to arts teaching. After returning to Taiwan in 1930, he began to instruct students in his atelier, originally located in No. 8 of 5-chōme, Taihei-cho, later moved to No. 83 of 7-chōme, and in 1936 it was officially registered as the "Nan-Ming Painting Institute". Those who had learned painting in Lu's atelier included Lin Xue-Zhou, Su Qi-Xiang, Liao Li-Fang, Luo Fang-Mei, Lu Meng-Jin, Yu De-Huang, Huang Hua-Zhou, Hsu Shen-Chuan, Chen Yi-Rang, and You Ben-Eh.
