= Gobara Koto =

Gobara Koto (August 8, 1887 – April 6, 1965), whose real name was Horie Tōichirō, was a Japanese painter a native of Shiojiri City, Nagano Prefecture, and an art educator during the period of Japanese rule in Taiwan. Inspired by the model of the Imperial Art Exhibition (Japan Fine Arts Exhibition) held in mainland Japan, Gobara Koto collaborated with artists such as Kinichiro Ishikawa, Tōho Shiotsuki, and Kinoshita Seigai to establish the Taiwan Art Exhibition in Taiwan. He was highly dedicated to nurturing younger generations of artists, with notable students including Chen Jin (painter), Lin Aqin, Qiu Jinlian, and Zhou Hongchou, etc., who have a huge influence on Taiwan's painting circles.

== Early career ==
Gohara Kotō, whose real name is Horie Toichiro, was born in Higashichikuma District, Nagano Prefecture, Japan. His biological father is Horie Ryuichi, and his mother's name is Koko, the second son of the Horie family. When Horie Toichiro was young, because his uncle Gohara Hosaburo had no heirs, he adopted his uncle as his adopted son and changed his surname to Gohara. In 1894, Gohara entered the Kenishi Branch of Hiroyuki Elementary School and Matsumoto Oriental High School. In 1901, he entered Matsumoto Junior High School. While at school, he was inspired by art teacher Takei Masumi (1875–1957), and started his interest in painting.(Masumi Takei graduated from the Metal Casting Department of Tokyo Art School in 1896 and was employed as an art teacher at Matsumoto Junior High School in 1900.)

== Taiwan Art Exhibition ==
The original idea of the Taiwan Exhibition was originally promoted by some Japanese art teachers and art enthusiasts in Taiwan. It was originally hoped that the exhibition would be promoted by the private sector. The magazine "Taiwan Times" at that time published an article by Tōho Shiotsuki, which mentioned that he, Gohara Kotō, Kinichiro Ishikawa, and others discussed the preparation of the Taiwan Art Exhibition near Taipei New Park. However, when they reported the matter to the officials, officials told them that they wanted the Government House authorities to host the exhibition. Later, the Taiwan Art Exhibition was organized by the Taiwan Education Association. Although it was nominally a private legal person, its main members were all important officials of the Governor-General's Office. Therefore, the Taiwan Art Exhibition can be regarded as an official exhibition with the taste of the colonial authorities. The exhibition is divided into two departments: the Eastern Painting Department and the Western Painting Department. From 1927 to 1936, the Taiwan Exhibition was held ten times, and Xiangyuan Gutong served as a judge for one to nine of them. The Taiwan Exhibition allowed many young artists to express themselves, the most famous of whom were the " Three Young Artists of the Taiwan Exhibition " ( Lin Yushan, Chen Jin, and Guo Xuehu ) at that time.

== Film and television works ==
In the 2016 TV series " Purple Daocheng ", she was played by Katsuki Baba.
