= Qiu Jinlian =

Taiwanese artist

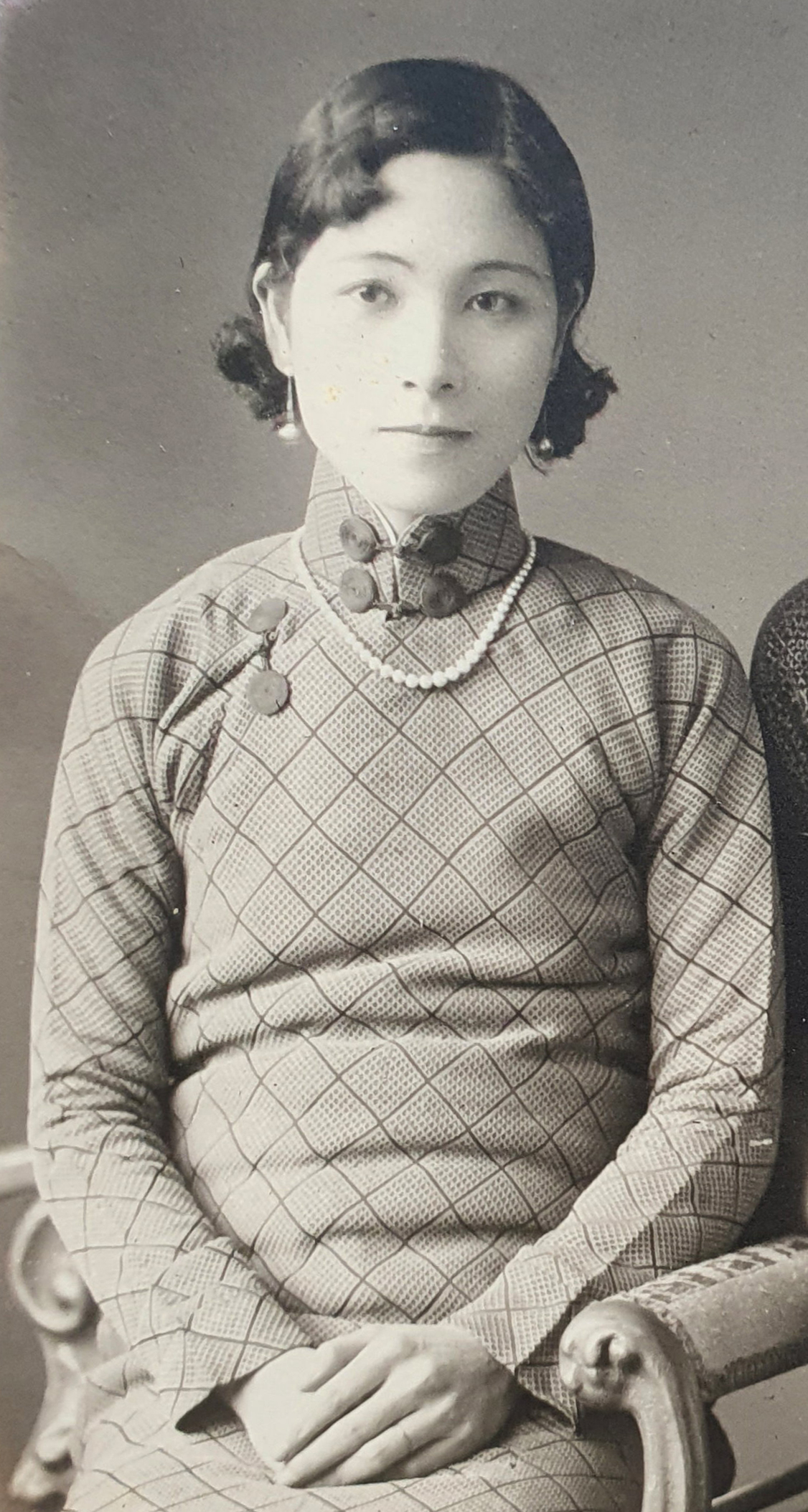
Qiu Jinlian in 1940

Qiu Jinlian (Hakka Chinese: Hiuˋ Gimˋ-lien; 1912–2015) was a Nihonga painter from Tongxiao, Miaoli County. She was one of the first female university students in Taiwan.

== Life story ==
In 1912, Chiu Jin-lian was born in the Hakka village of Fuxingli, Tongxiao, Miaoli County. Born out of wedlock, she was deeply cherished by her father, Chiu Guo-zhen. To make it easier for his daughter to attend school, Chiu Guo-zhen advocated for the establishment of the Nanhe Branch of the Tongxiao Public School. At the time, due to the conservative attitudes in rural areas, Chiu Jin-lian was the only female student in her class. Chiu Guo-zhen was even mocked by locals for supporting his daughter’s education.

In 1927, Chiu Jin-lian was admitted to Taipei Municipal Zhongshan Girls High School commonly referred to as "Third Girls' High"). During her studies, she learned traditional East Asian Nihonga under the guidance of art teacher Kyu Harada and became friends with Zhou Hongchou, Peng Rongmei, Lin Aqin, and others. In 1931, Chiu Jin-lian graduated from Third Girls' High and entered the newly established Private Taipei Women's Higher Academy. After advancing her education, Chiu continued studying under Kyu Harada. In 1932 and 1933, her fine gouache flower paintings on silk, "Amaranth" and "Allamanda", respectively, were selected for the Taiwan Art Exhibition. Her works and achievements were featured in the Taiwan Daily News. Furthermore, through Kyu Harada, Chiu became acquainted with the "Three Youths of the Taiwan Exhibition"— Kuo Hsueh-hu, Chen Jin (painter), and Lin Yushan. She developed a particularly close sibling-like bond with Guo Xuehu. In 1934, Chiu Jin-lian graduated from Taipei Women's Higher Academy, becoming one of Taiwan's first female university graduates.

In February 1938, Qiu Jinlian returned to her hometown and married Lin Longsheng, a graduate of Taipei Medical College. Her close friend, Zhou Hongchou, lamented, "Jinlian! At home, we were cherished like incense burners, but after marriage, it's as if we've become like chicken droppings!" Shortly after their marriage, Lin Longsheng was drafted to serve in World War II as a military doctor in the Philippines. His plans to open a clinic in Miaoli were abandoned, and he sold the clinic land at a low price, leaving behind only tens of thousands of dollars before his departure. Initially, the couple exchanged letters; communication ceased after Lin was transferred to Manila. Left without word from her husband, Qiu Jinlian returned to her parents' home with their eldest son and an eight-month-old younger son.After the war, unlike other military doctors who returned home, Lin Longsheng did not come back, and it was presumed he had died in a foreign land. Qiu Jinlian encountered Yamauchi Sei, a retired officer in his seventies who had served in the First Sino-Japanese War. At the time, Yamauchi was preparing to return to Japan and was liquidating his assets. Upon learning of Qiu Jinlian's plight, he offered her and her children temporary residence in a Japanese-style dormitory.More than a year after the war had ended, and just days before Yamauchi was set to leave for Japan, Lin Longsheng miraculously returned. In response, Yamauchi gifted a portion of his land and housing to Lin Longsheng and Qiu Jinlian and assisted Lin in establishing Huairen Clinic in Tongxiao Town. Lin Longsheng, known for his kindness and medical expertise, earned great respect in the community. Qiu Jinlian actively participated in local affairs and was elected as the executive director of the Tongxiao Town Women's Association in 1954.

In 1977 Lin Longsheng died, and a few years later their eldest son died. Qiu Jinlian was left to rely on her second and youngest sons for companionship. In her later years, Qiu Jinlian faced financial difficulties and struggled to cover medical expenses for her son. She mortgaged her house for a loan of 6 million NTD and was unable to pay the interest, leaving her home at risk of being auctioned.Nevertheless, Qiu Jinlian maintained a positive outlook on life and frequently attended reunions with her classmates from the Third High School for Girls. In 2010, Qiu Jinlian became embroiled in a land dispute when a construction company illegally dug a drainage ditch behind her residence. After her petition to the town office yielded no results, she sought help from Liu Cheng-hung, the then-List of County magistrates of Miaoli, accompanied by the former town mayor's wife. It was only after this intervention that the construction company’s actions were confirmed as illegal, and they were ordered to cease work immediately.

In 2015 she died at the age of 105.

== Artistic creation ==
During her school years Qiu often used campus plants as subjects for her sketches, adhering to the artistic philosophy of painters during the Japanese colonial era, such as Xiangyuan Gutong, which emphasized depicting Taiwan's natural and cultural landscapes. Qiu meticulously observed and copied flowers and plants, first creating rough sketches. When painting, she would begin by applying a layer of adhesive on silk, followed by layer upon layer of color. Each color had to be separately mixed with powdered pigment, glue, and water. Due to the time-consuming process, completing a single color glue painting could take up to a month.

Qiu Jinlian's color glue Bird-and-flower painting Yanlaihong (Amaranth), created in 1932, is now part of the collection at the National Taiwan Museum of Fine Arts. Painted on Silk painting, the work is meticulously detailed in the gongbi style, emphasizing the natural posture of the Amaranthus tricolor's red and green branches and leaves. The light, shading, and tonal variations of the leaves are intricately depicted. This piece was selected for the Sixth Taiwan Fine Arts Exhibition. Another work, Allamanda, created in 1933, is now housed in the Taipei Fine Arts Museum, with the acquisition price reaching 3 million NTD. The Allamanda plant, also known as Allamanda cathartica, was an exotic species planted in the botanical garden opposite Taipei Women's Higher School. This subject stood in stark contrast to the native flora commonly depicted by male Taiwanese painters. The painting demonstrates Qiu's meticulous observation and strong skills in sketching from life. It was selected for the Seventh Taiwan Fine Arts Exhibition. Qiu Jinlian often signed her works with "Jinlian" and added a personal seal.

At the time, female artists who were selected for the Taiwan Fine Arts Exhibition often prioritized family life after marriage. For instance, Lin Aqin did not resume her artistic pursuits until her children were grown, while Zhou Hongchou and Chen Xuejun withdrew from the art world altogether, as did Qiu Jinlian. Under the prevailing social norms of the time, women's talents were often concealed, unable to shine to their full potential. In her later years, Qiu Jinlian remarked, "I never thought of becoming a painter."

== See also ==
- Zhou Hongchou
- Peng Rongmei
- Lin Aqin
- Chen Xuejun
