= Chen Xuejun (painter) =

Taiwanese painter

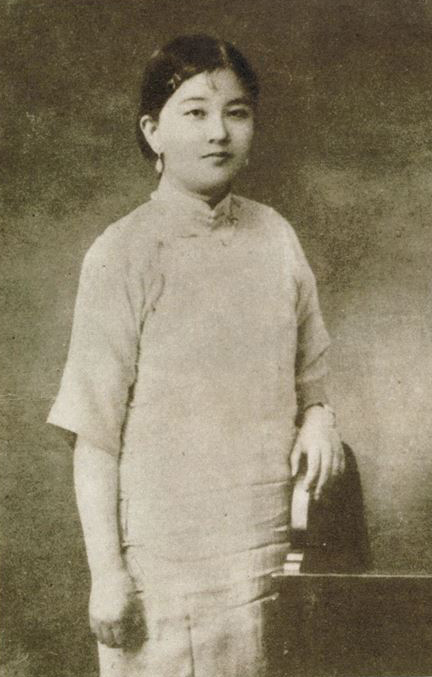
Chen Xuejun in 1933

Chen Xuejun (Taiwanese Hokkien: Tân Soat-kun, c. 1912–?), born in Dadaocheng, Jiancheng Ding, First Street, Taipei, was a Taiwanese Nihonga (Japanese-style painting) artist.

== Life ==
Chen Xuejun was born around 1912 in Dadaocheng, Taipei. Her father, Chen Qiumu, served as an instructor at Dadaocheng Public School (now Taiping Elementary School) from 1911 to 1914 and later worked in the Industrial and Commercial Division of the Governor-General's Colonial Affairs Bureau. Although detailed information about her family is limited, her father’s profession and educational background suggest that Chen Xuejun came from a middle-class family. For high school, she attended Taipei Third High School for Girls (now Taipei Municipal Zhongshan Girls High School), where she studied under Koton Sato, an artist who emphasized Sketch (drawing). She graduated in 1930 as part of the first graduating class and then continued her studies at a Women’s Higher College.In August 1931, Chen Xuejun participated in her first art exhibition, serving as a model for Ichiki Shiori, a Japanese mainland female artist. Chen’s work, Flower Shadows, was selected for the Eastern Painting Division of the 5th Taiwan Fine Arts Exhibition. At the time, collaboration between Japanese mainland and Taiwanese female artists was extremely rare, let alone having a female student serve as a model. As a result, Ichiki Shiori's painting, Flower Shadows, created a sensation. A women’s section of a newspaper reported, “Using a local girl as a model—Ichiki Shiori prepares an artwork for the Taiwan Exhibition.” Their connection is presumed to have been facilitated by Koton Sato.In an October interview that same year, Chen Xuejun mentioned that although several works from the Women’s Higher College were exhibited at the Taiwan Exhibition that year, none were by Taiwanese artists. Therefore, this particular work was of great significance. However, Chen Xuejun's own work was not selected that year.

The following year, encouraged by her art teacher Koton Sato, Chen Xuejun and her classmates were selected for the 6th Taiwan Fine Arts Exhibition. At the time, six students from the Women’s Higher College were chosen for the Eastern Painting Division, including her classmates Zhou Hongchou, Qiu Jinlian, and Peng Rongmei. Photographs of these students were published in the Taiwan Daily News, and many students from the school were regarded as prominent "lady painters" of the era.After graduating, Chen Xuejun initially stayed home to help with household chores. She later married a tea merchant who ran a business on Dihua Street and assisted in managing the shop in Yongle Ding. In 1937, the alumni magazine of the Women’s Higher College described Chen Xuejun's life in the “Updates on Classmates” section: “Her child passed away in April of last year, leaving her very lonely every day. She seems to have suffered from ill health due to her grief. We hope she recovers soon and can show us a cheerful face at the next gathering.” This indicates that Chen Xuejun’s child died in April 1936. Additionally, it was noted that “after entering family life, she seemed to have developed a keen interest in gardening.” This suggests that Chen Xuejun expanded her interests from painting to gardening. However, due to her marriage, she did not pursue a career as a professional artist.

== Works ==
Chen Xuejun's works in the Gouache Bird-and-flower painting of the Taiwan Fine Arts Exhibition include Wind Chime Hibiscus and Ixora chinensis, which were selected for the 6th (1932) and 7th (1933) exhibitions, respectively. Based on comparisons, Wind Chime Hibiscus is believed to depict Hibiscus schizopetalus, characterized by precise lines and brushwork. Meanwhile, Ixora portrays a common plant in Taiwan with a detailed and realistic depiction of flower clusters and petals, even including subtle details such as leaves damaged by insects, reflecting her realistic style. Chen Xuejun typically signed her works with “Xuejun” and used a square seal bearing the same name.

== Footnotes ==
1. At the time, Taiwanese gouache painting was gradually gaining popularity under the influence of Japanese art trends. The government, through the Taiwan Education Association, encouraged realistic painting styles that had been promoted since the Meiji Restoration, while opposing traditional depictions of landscapes or the "Four Gentlemen" (plum, orchid, bamboo, and chrysanthemum). Japanese observers referred to Taiwanese gouache paintings as "Wan-made paintings," distinguishing them from nihonga ("Japanese paintings"). As a result of the government's deliberate control over artistic styles, only three local Taiwanese painters under the age of 20 were selected for the Eastern Painting Division in the first Taiwan Fine Arts Exhibition.
