= Zhou Hongchou =

Taiwanese painter (1914–1981)

- 周紅綢
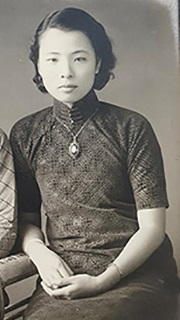
- Born: 1914; Yongle Town, Dadaocheng, Taipei, Taiwan
- Died: 1981 (aged 66–67)
- Other name: Tsiu Hong-tiu
- Spouse: Zhang Oukun (m. 1937–)

Zhou Hongchou (Chinese: 周紅綢; 1914–1981) was a Taiwanese painter of Japanese-style art during the 1930s. She was celebrated alongside other female artists of the time, such as Chen Jin. Hongchou's works primarily focused on floral and bird themes, with a particular expertise in depicting plants like orchid and Nymphoides hydrophylla.

== Life story ==
Zhou Hongchou was born in 1914, in Yongle Town, Dadaocheng, Taipei. Her father, Zhou Yifang, ran a paper store named "Yifang Trading" on Dihua Street. Zhou Hongchou was the eldest daughter in the family, with two younger sisters and two younger brothers. When she was eleven, her father died, leaving her mother, Zheng Nian, to raise five children on her own. The three sisters all graduated from Taipei Third Girls' High School (now Taipei Municipal Zhongshan Girls High School) and later went to Japan to study fine arts, music, and design. During the Japanese colonial period, many students and alumni of Taipei Third Girls' High School were selected for the Taiwan Fine Arts Exhibition (commonly known as the "Taiten"). At that time, Koton Hyōhara, a teacher at the school, encouraged students to observe nature and often took them to the botanical garden for outdoor sketching. Inspired by Hyōhara's approach to sketching, Hongchou's painting Oncidium was selected for the Fifth Taiten in 1931.The following year, Hongchou transferred to Tokyo Women's Art School. During her studies there, she was selected for the Taiten Eastern Painting Division twice, in 1933 and 1936, with her works Water Lily (Bird-and-flower painting) and Young Girl (a figure painting), respectively. In 1935, Hongchou also exhibited her work Still Life at the 4th Seishi-sha Exhibition. At the time, only six Taiwanese women were admitted to Japanese art schools, and Hongchou was the last among them.According to the alumni association of Tokyo Women's Art School, graduates automatically became members. Hongchou was listed as a new member in the 1935 annual report.

In 1937, Hongchou married Zhang Oukun from Taiping Town, Taipei. The Zhang family owned "Zhang Donglong Trading," a well-known business on Dihua Street engaged in the automobile and petroleum trade. Hongchou accompanied her husband to cities such as Shanghai and Guangzhou to expand the family business. After her marriage, Hongchou appears to have ceased creating artwork and likely did not continue participating in exhibitions.

== See also ==
- Lin Aqin
- Peng Rongmei
- Qiu Jinlian
