= Futen =

Futen may refer to:

- Fūten (風天, lit. "Heavenly Wind"), another name for Fūjin, the Japanese god of wind
- Futen (府展, lit. "Government Exhibition"), the abbreviated name for Governor-General's Art Exhibition, the official art exhibition in Taiwan under Japanese rule from 1938 to 1943, which was previously known as Taiwan Fine Arts Exhibition
- Fu-Ten, or Fu-Ten promotion, was a defunct Japanese wrestling promotion owned by Daisuke Ikeda from 2005 to 2015
