= Automated weather map display =

Computers used in a weather map display system at the University of Nebraska at Omaha

An automated weather map display shows updated weather maps or other images for public viewing.

== Description ==
The weather images may be accessed interactively by the viewer, or a series of maps may be displayed continuously as a loop. Once the maps or webcam images are downloaded from public sites, they are shown using the full screen of the computer display. At a predetermined interval, the display program downloads new images for display. With older software or hardware, the display may be interrupted during updates.

The system is usually used in schools or libraries and other public areas, and is ideal for science-oriented display cases and travel center booths. It is a common fixture in many rest areas along interstate highways. In an educational setting, the maps allow students to see the relationship between global weather patterns and the local weather that they experience. The system can also be used to display emergency weather warnings.

== Example system ==
The hardware requirements are relatively modest, allowing older or even obsolescent computers to be used. The primary requirements are reliable hardware, a network connection, and a secure location visible to the public.

For example, the weather map display system at the Department of Geography/Geology at the University of Nebraska at Omaha has been in continuous operation since 1999. Consisting of six Apple Macintosh computers, some dating to 1992 and with as little as 32 MB of memory, the system uses Cron and Applescript to perform certain operations every hour. Files that are downloaded include GIF or JPEG images that display current weather conditions, including NEXRAD radar, lightning strikes, weather warnings and watches. Once the files are downloaded to a folder, JPEGView displays the files in a continuous loop. After an hour, JPEGView stops, the weather maps are deleted, and a new set of maps is downloaded. JPEGView starts again and the new maps are displayed.

The specific computers used in the weather map display system are two Macintosh IIvx computers built in 1992, a Macintosh LC III from 1993, a Macintosh Centris 610 from 1994 and two Power Macintosh 8500 computers built in 1995 that display animated weather maps. Software includes Okey Dokey Pro, Cron, JPEGView, and Applescript. QuickTime Pro is used for the animated weather map display.
