= Seifuku no Shōjo =

1932 painting by Mariko Kashio

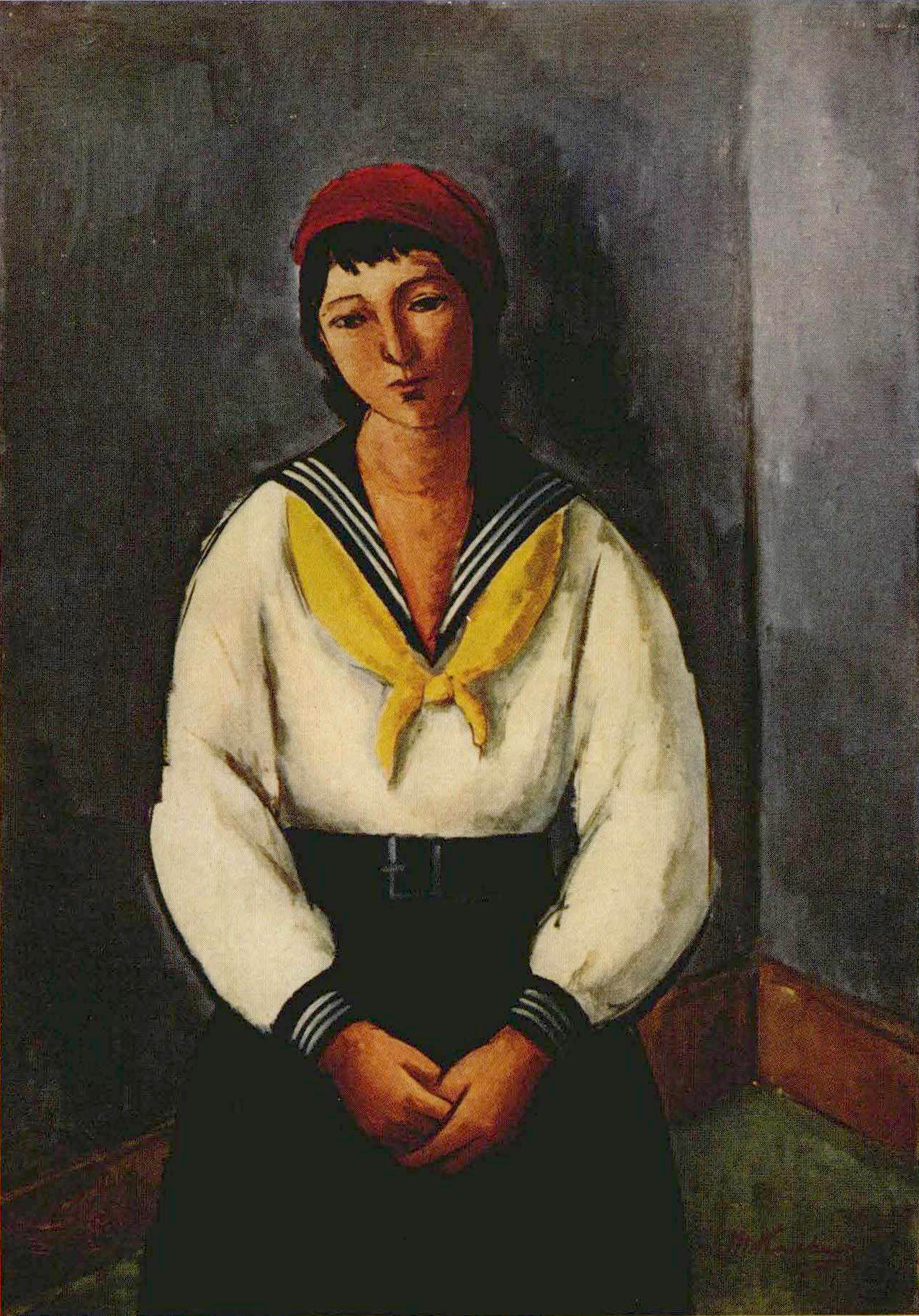
- Artist: Mariko Kashio
- Year: 1932
- Type: Western painting

Seifuku no Shōjo (Japanese: 制服の少女, romanized: Seifuku no Shōjo, lit. 'Girl in uniform') is a Western painting created by the Japanese-ruled Taiwanese painter Mariko Kashio in 1932. It was selected for the 6th Taiwan Art Exhibition. The location of the original painting is currently unknown, but its color plate is included in the 1938 "Collection of Mariko Kashio's Posthumous Works" (Chinese: 柏尾鞠子遺作集).

== Depicted content ==
Seifuku no Shōjo depicts a girl wearing a red beret, a blue and white three-lined sailor fuku with Kansai collar, but without chest cover, a dark blue pleated skirt, and a pin-buckle belt around her waist. She has a yellow neckscarf tied around her chest, her hands in front of her body, and a thoughtful expression. The background is a gray wall, which contrasts warm and cold with the tones of the figure's clothing.

The girl in the painting may have been a student as model, but the "Collection of Mariko Kashio's Posthumous Works" also includes a self-portrait wearing a sailor fuku, so it may also be the artist herself.
