= Pan Chun-yuan =

Taiwanese artist (1891–1972)

Pan Chun-yuan (Taiwanese: Phuann Tshun-guân; Chinese:潘春源; 1891–1972), originally named Pan Lianke (潘聯科) and also known as "Ke-si,"(科司) with the courtesy names Jinyin (進盈) and Cunyuan (邨原, 春源), was a painter hailing from Dashi Street (打石街) in the city of Tainan, Taiwan.

== Life ==
In 1891 (the 17th year of the Guangxu reign), Pan Lianke, later known as Pan Chun-yuan, was born into a merchant family on Dashi Street in Tainan City (near the intersection of Gongyuan Road (公園路) and Minquan Road (民權路)). His father was Pan Zhao (潘照). From a young age, Pan Chun-yuan displayed a natural talent and interest in painting. At the age of 11, he enrolled in Tainan Second Public School (now Liren Elementary School, 立人國民小學), which was located inside the Tainan Shuixian Temple (水仙宮) at that time. At 14, Pan Lianke dropped out of Tainan Second Public School and began self-study in Chinese ink painting and culture, frequently observing traditional craftsmen's work near his home. In 1909, Pan Lianke established the "Chunyuan Art Studio" (春源畫室) next to the Kaiji San Guan Temple (開基三官廟), engaging in mounting and painting.

According to scholar Xiao Qiong-rui (蕭瓊瑞), in 1909, Pan Lianke was invited by the Bajijing Wudi Temple (八吉境五帝廟) to repaint murals, marking the beginning of his temple mural work. During the renovation of the Lords of the Three Mountains Temple (三山國王廟) in Tainan, Pan Lianke went to observe and learn from artisans from the Chaoshan region, hired by the temple for their expertise. In 1924 and 1926, Pan also traveled to Guangzhou and Quanzhou to explore and study arts. He even attended the Shantou Jimei Art School (集美美術學校) to research Chinese ink painting and charcoal portraits. In addition to his diligent practice of painting and calligraphy, Pan also delved into music and poetry. In 1914, he joined the poetry society "Jingwen Society"(經文社) and the "Yihe Society," (以和社) which performed Nanguan music. In his leisure time, Pan often improvised performances in his art studio.

In the field of painting, in 1928, Pan Lianke's artwork "Scenes from a Pasture" (牧場所見) was selected for the second Taiwan Arts Exhibition (臺灣美術展覽會, commonly known as "Taiten", 台展). He continued to be selected for six consecutive sessions, depicting scenes of his hometown, such as the painting "Morning Colors of the Mountain Village" (山村曉色), which was selected in 1933. For the first four sessions, he used gouache as the medium, while for the last two sessions, he turned to ink painting. However, most of the seven paintings selected by Pan Chun-yuan in the Taiten are now lost, with only the work "Ox Cart" (牛車) remaining.

In 1928, Pan Lianke, along with other artists from the Tainan and Chiayi region, including Lin Yushan, formed the "Chun-meng Painting Society" (春萌畫會) to promote the Oriental painting style in Tainan and Chiayi. His temple murals were influenced by the Imperialization Movement during the Japanese colonial period, leading to a reduction in temple paintings. After World War II, he temporarily lived in Anping.

Post-war, Pan Chun-yuan painted murals for several temples, including the Kaiji San Guan Temple and Bajijing Wudi Emperors Temple. He also worked on mural paintings and door deity illustrations for temples such as Guanmiao Shanxi Temple (山西宮) and Liujia Mazu Temple. In 1950, he began creating numerous landscape paintings and served as a judge for the National Painting Department at the Tainan City Art Exhibition, as well as a consultant at the Tainan Chinese Painting Research Association. In 1960, for health reasons, Pan Chun-yuan ceased temple mural painting but continued creating ink paintings until his passing in 1972.

== Works ==
- "Scenes from a Pasture" (牧場所見), selected for the second Taiwan Fine Arts Exhibition in 1928.
- "Bathing" (浴), selected for the third Taiwan Fine Arts Exhibition in 1929.
- "Ox Cart" (牛車), selected for the third Taiwan Fine Arts Exhibition in 1929, currently the only surviving work, housed in the Taipei Fine Arts Museum.
- "Harmonious Melody of Qin and Sheng" (琴笙雅韻), selected for the fourth Taiwan Fine Arts Exhibition in 1930.
- "Su Wu Tending Sheep" (蘇武牧羊), approximately 1930.
- "Women" (婦女), selected for the fifth Taiwan Fine Arts Exhibition in 1931.
- "Emperor Wu" (武帝), selected for the sixth Taiwan Fine Arts Exhibition in 1932.
- "Guanyu, God of Martial Art" (關帝君), unspecified exhibition.
- "Morning Colors of the Mountain Village" (山村曉色), selected for the seventh Taiwan Fine Arts Exhibition in 1933.

== Murals ==
Pan Chun-yuan's architectural mural works, recognized as cultural heritage, include publicly accessible pieces such as:

- Murals at Bajijing Wudi Temple (around 1914).
- Door gods at Dongmen Daren Temple (東門大人廟).
- Murals at Jiali Jintang Hall (金唐殿, 1928).
- Murals at Yong'an Huang Family Ancestral House (永安黃家古厝, 1930), later repainted by Pan Lishui (潘麗水) in 1962; currently a historical building in Kaohsiung, not open to the public.
- Murals at Kaiji San Guan Temple (1947).
- Murals at Bajijing Wudi Temple (1947), restored.
- Murals on both sides of the main hall at Shanhua Qing'an Temple (慶安宮, 1952), now a designated historical site in Tainan City.
- Door gods at Liujia Mazu Temple (Heng'an Temple,(恆安宮) 1958).
- Door gods at Guanmiao Shanxi Temple (1958).

== Family and Disciples ==
Pan Chun-yuan had several children, including his eldest son, Pan Lishui (潘麗水), and second son, Pan Yingzhou (潘瀛洲, 1916–2004). He also had grandchildren, among them Pan Yuexiong (潘岳雄), and several of them inherited his artistic skills. Notable disciples include Zeng Zhugen (曾竹根, 1910–1984), style name Yunlin (雲林), and Ding Wang (丁網, 1912–1972), style name Yunpeng (雲鵬). Ding Wang's sons, Ding Qingshi (丁清石, 1940–2003), Ding Qingshan(丁清山), and Ding Qingchuan (丁清川), also became skilled mural painters.
