= Display case =

Cabinet with transparent surfaces

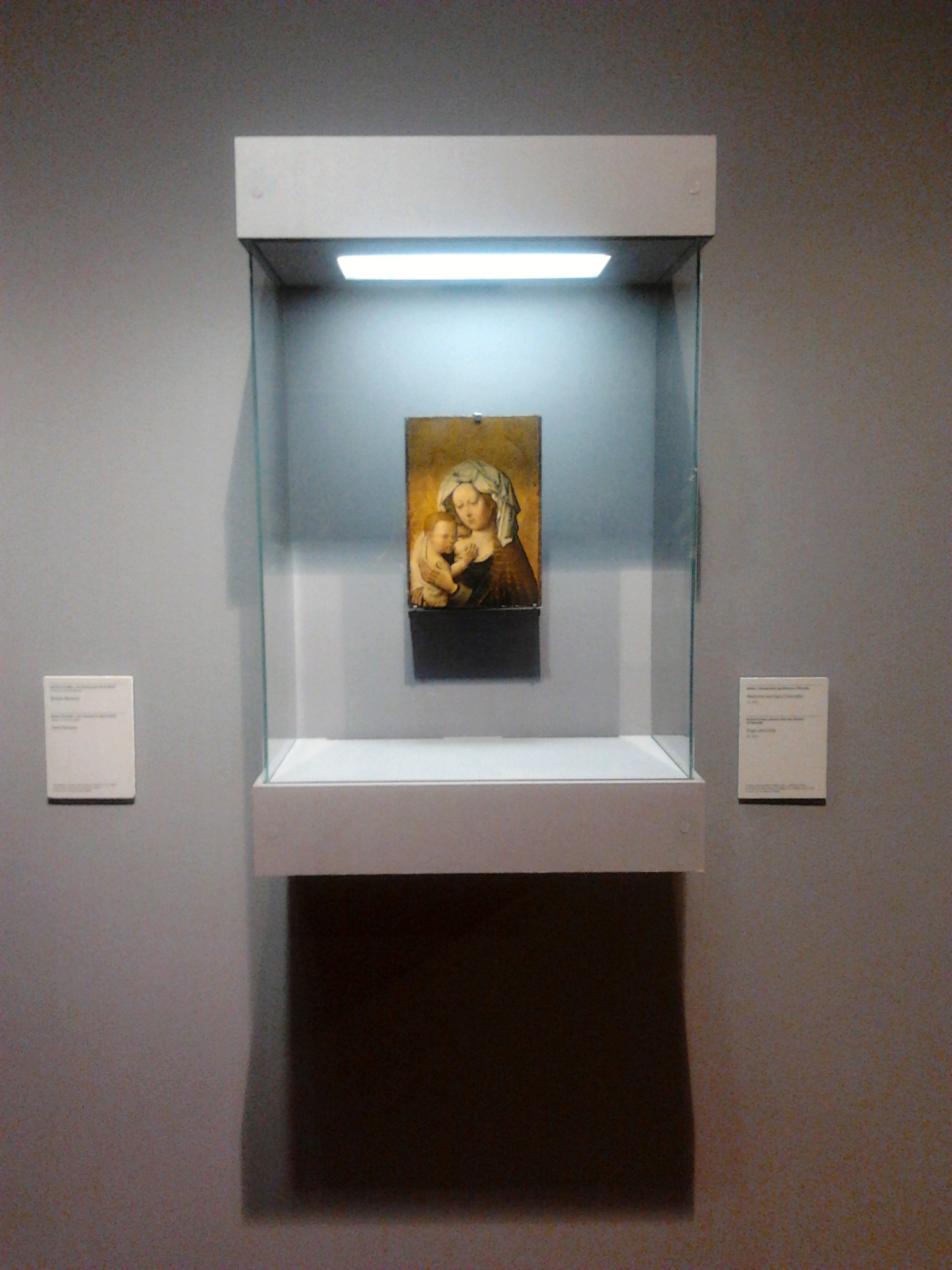
Display case shows and protects a painting by a follower of Robert Campin

A display case (also called a showcase, display cabinet, shadow box, or vitrine) is a cabinet with one or often more transparent tempered glass (or plastic, normally acrylic for strength) surfaces, used to display objects for viewing. A display case may appear in an exhibition, museum, retail store, restaurant, or house. Often, labels are included with the displayed objects, providing information such as descriptions or prices. In a museum, the displayed cultural artifacts are normally part of the museum's collection, or are part of a temporary exhibition. In retail or a restaurant, the items are normally being offered for sale. A trophy case is used to display sports trophies or other awards.

== Description ==
A display case may be freestanding on the floor, or built-in (usually a custom installation). Built-in displays may be mounted on the wall, may act as room partitions, or may be hung from the ceiling. On occasion, display cases are built into the floor, such as at the Museum of Sydney (in Sydney, Australia), where the remains of drains and privies are shown in their original context, along with other archeological artifacts.

There are three types of freestanding showcases: counter, middle floor (mid-floor), and wall. Counter showcases are designed to display objects through one side (the "customer side") and have them accessible through the other (the "clerk side"). For this reason, the counter displays are most relevant for retail stores. The middle floor cases are built to display objects from all sides, and are meant to be placed in the middle of the room. Wall showcases are meant to be placed against a wall, where the products are displayed and accessed from the same side. These last two types are used heavily – not only by stores – but also by museums, schools, and especially in homes to showcase valuable items or collections.

Display cases are typically made by specialist companies with a background in woodworking or welding, and come in standard sizes or often are custom order. Display cases are often designed with security in mind and are normally lockable. They also are made in variety of styles, shapes, and materials as available at a store fixture supplier. Conservation grade cases are used to display valuable artifacts in museums, libraries, and archives. These cases are designed to provide a tightly controlled environment free from chemical pollutants.

They can ship pre-assembled or knockdown (in pieces to be assembled by the customer). Pre-assembled showcases are assembled (and usually tested) by the manufacturer, and are shipped ready-to-use. Knockdown showcases are usually lower in price and cheaper to ship, but may be of poorer quality than pre-assembled, and may arrive missing pieces.

American artist Joseph Cornell constructed many shadow boxes during his career, with the works evoking a strong sense of nostalgia, decay, or loss.

== Use in the United States military ==
By tradition, shadow boxes are typically presented to members of the United States Armed Forces upon retirement. These shadow boxes will usually contain the various medals and awards a person has earned through a military career, the flags of both their country and their military service branch, and their final badge of rank. A similar case, called a uniform display case, displays an entire military uniform with correct insignia placement.

== Gallery ==
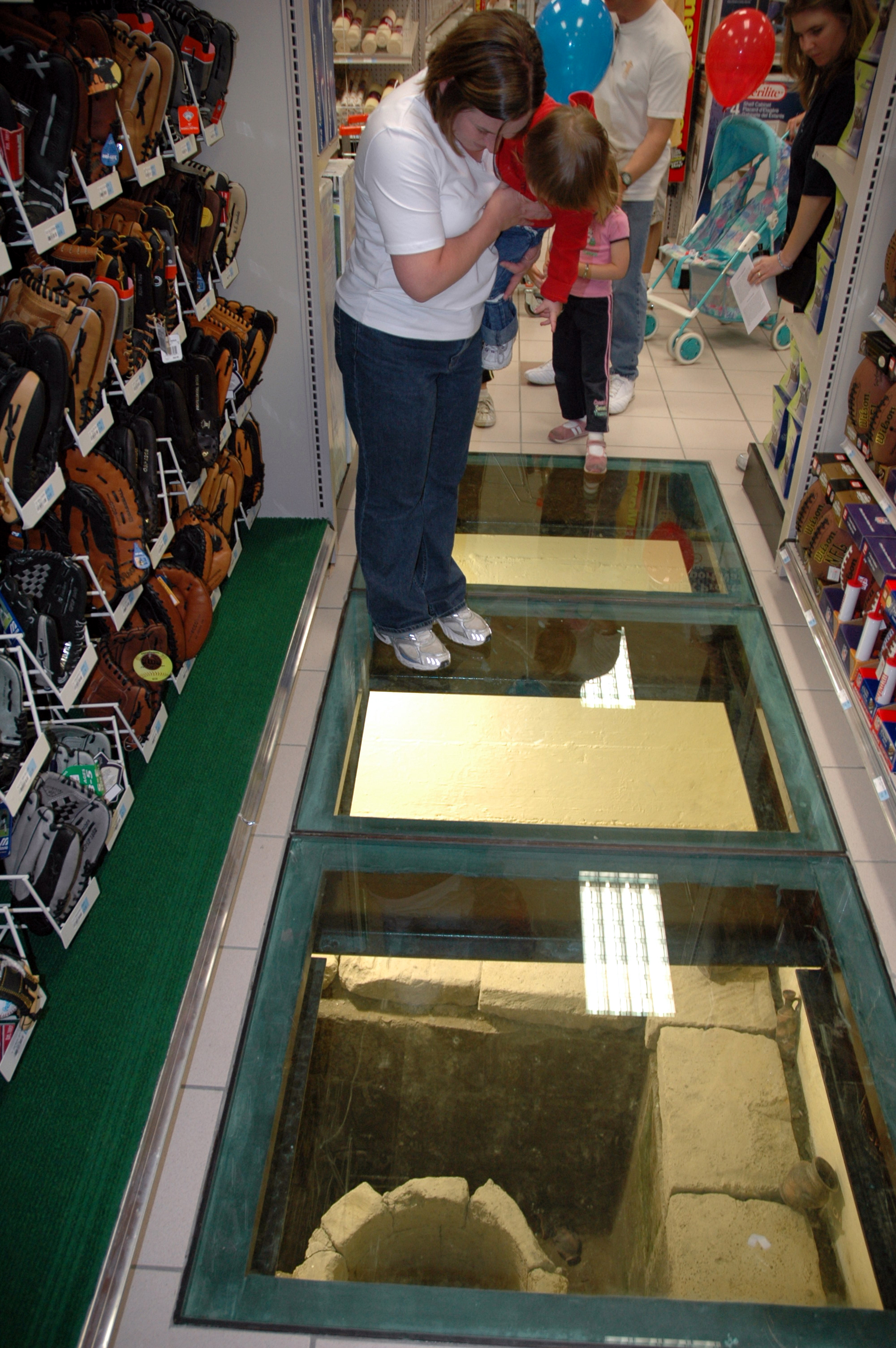
Glass in-floor display case

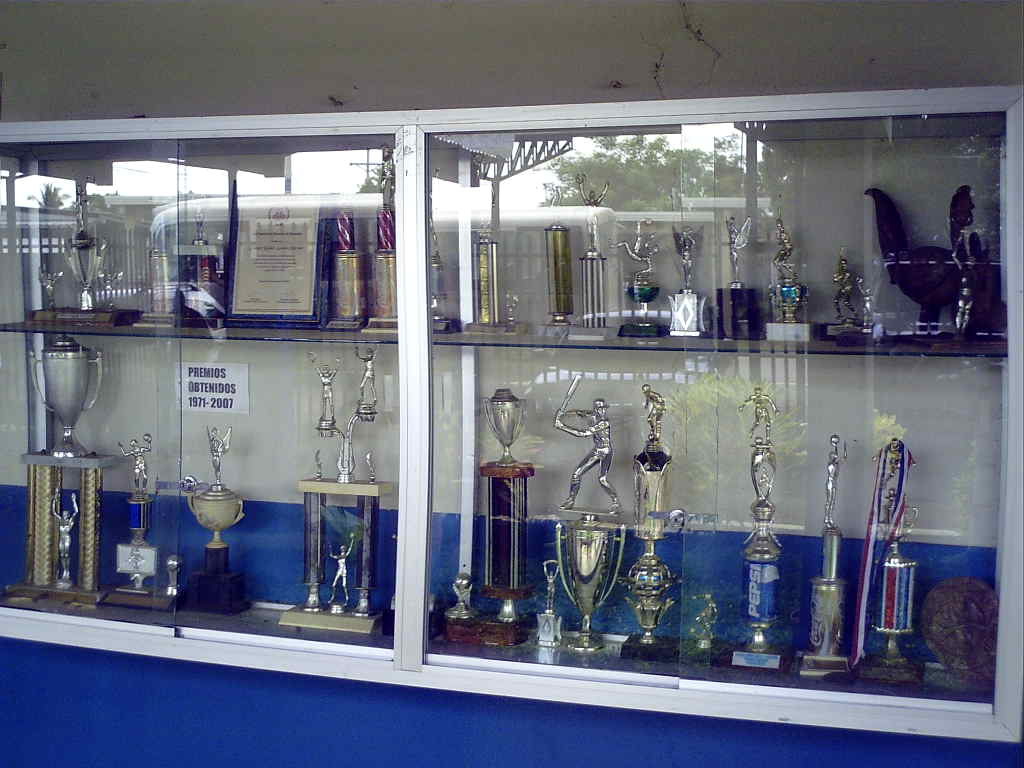
Wall-mounted trophy case

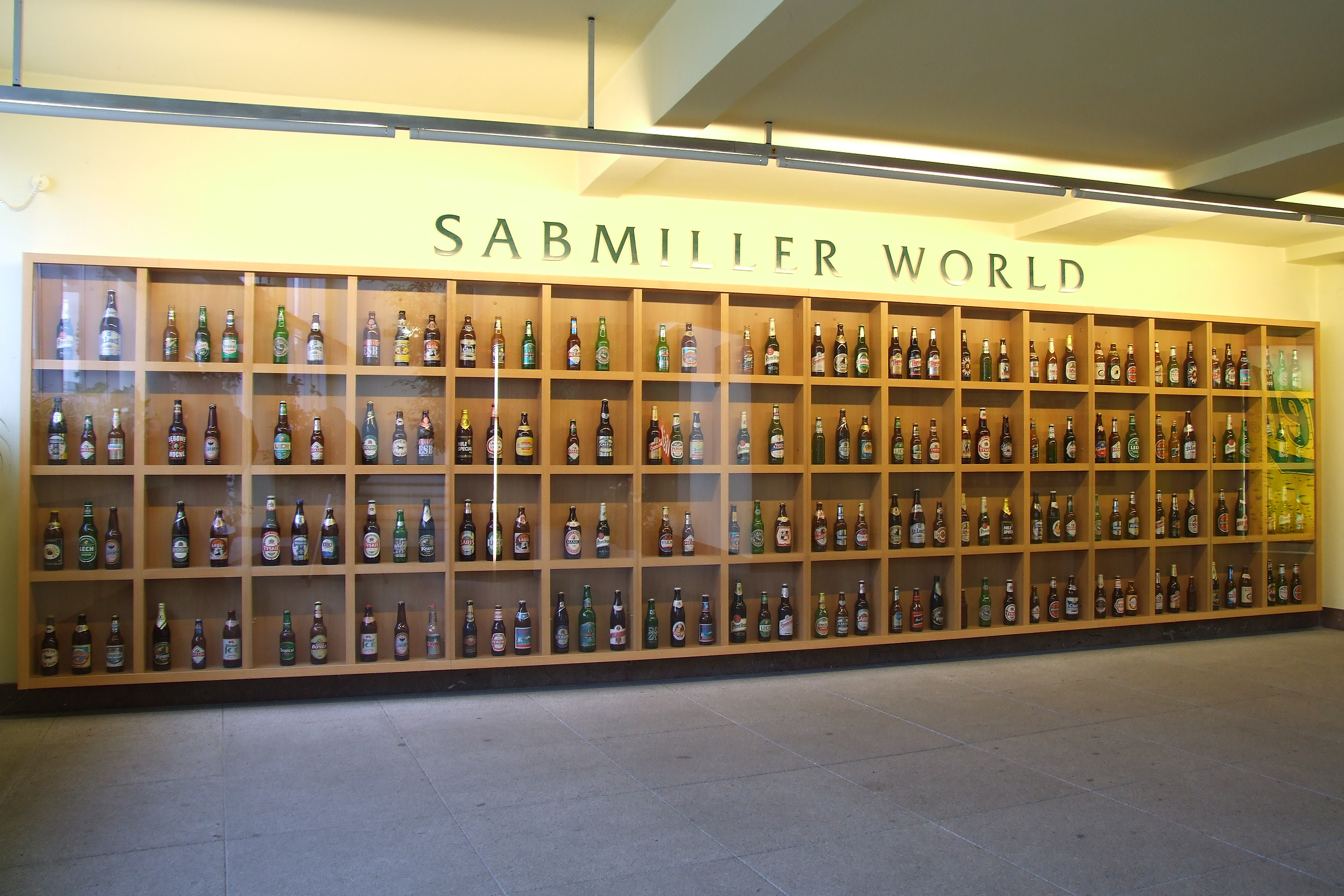
Wall-sized display case

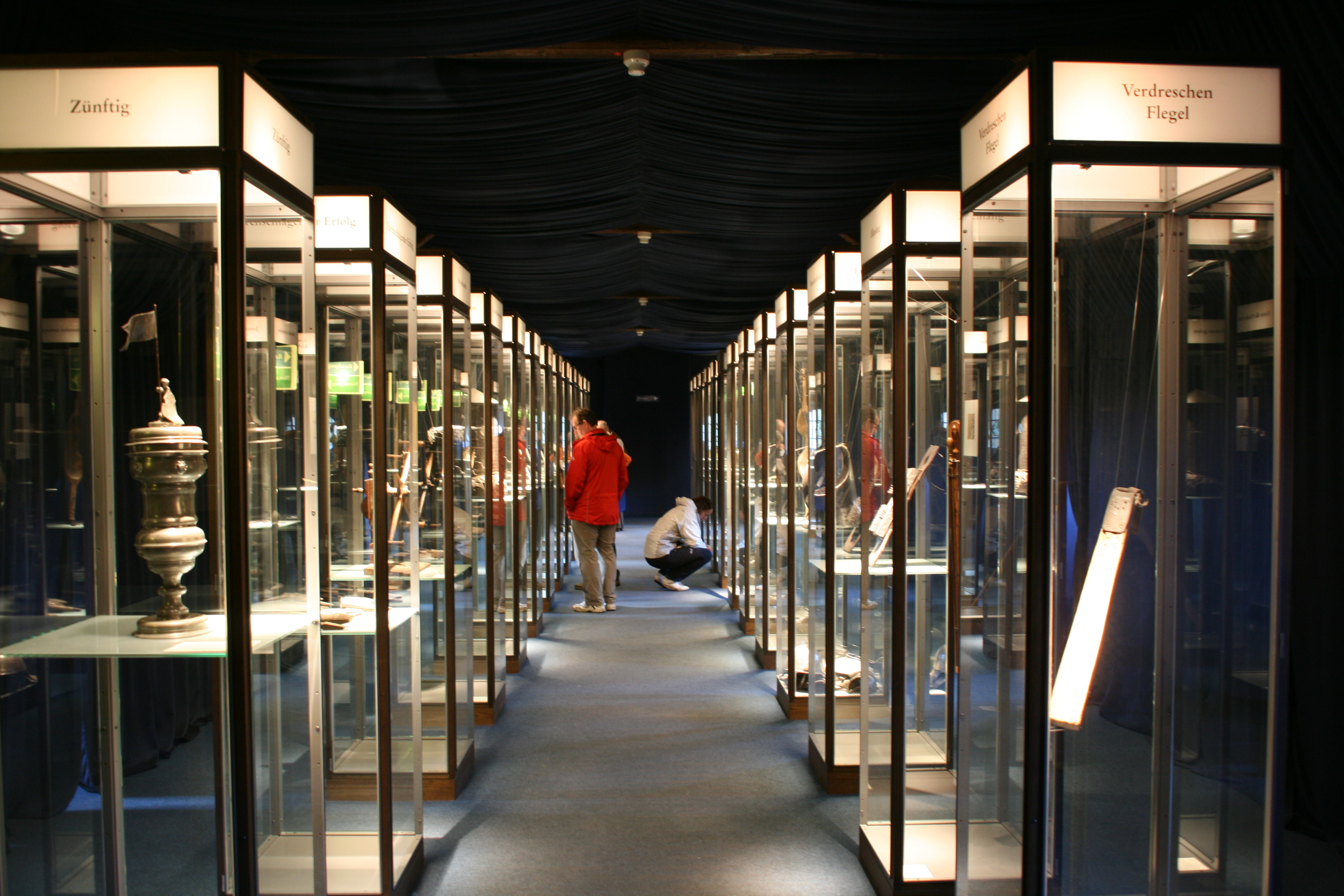
Free-standing museum display cases

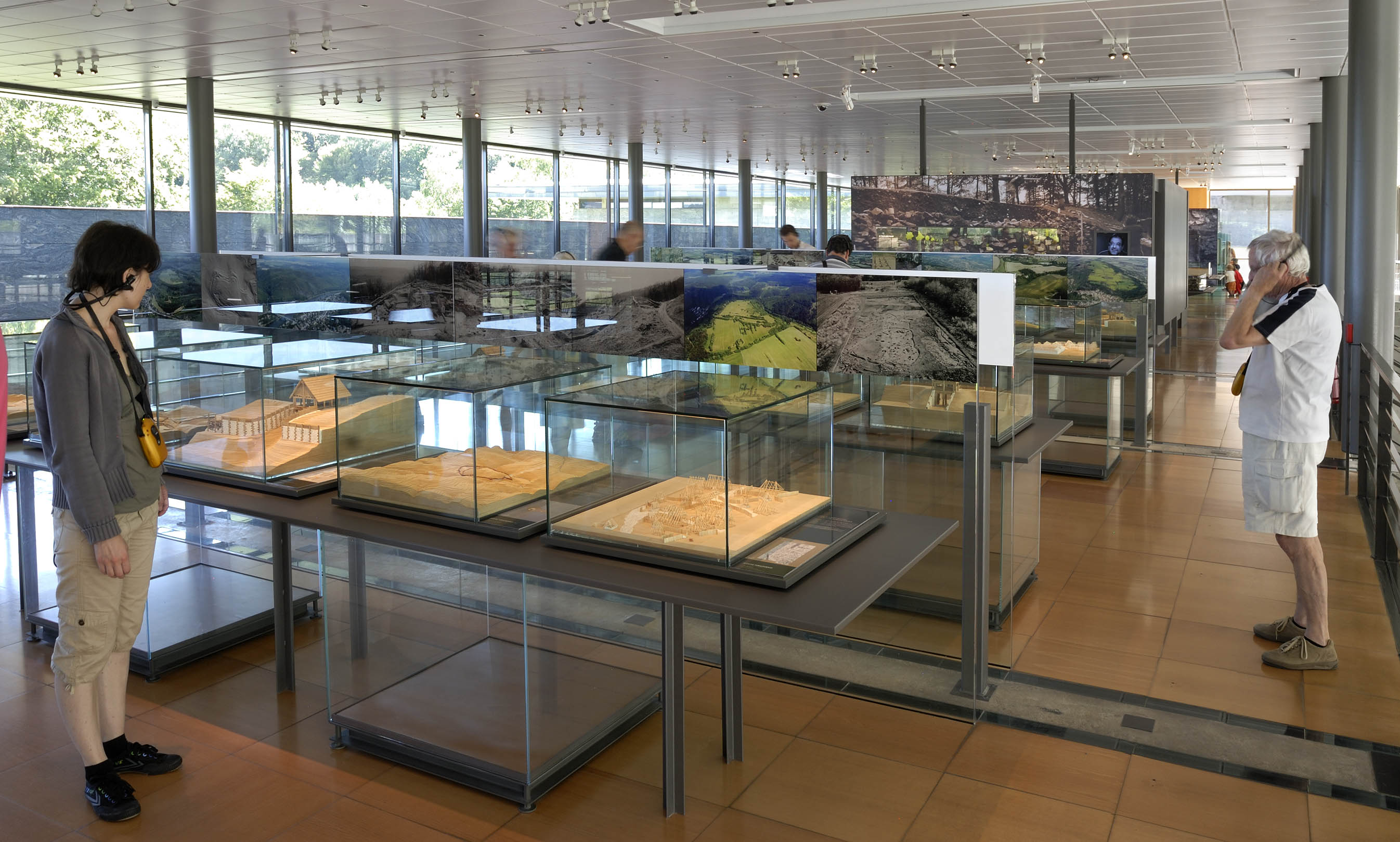
Table-height display of models

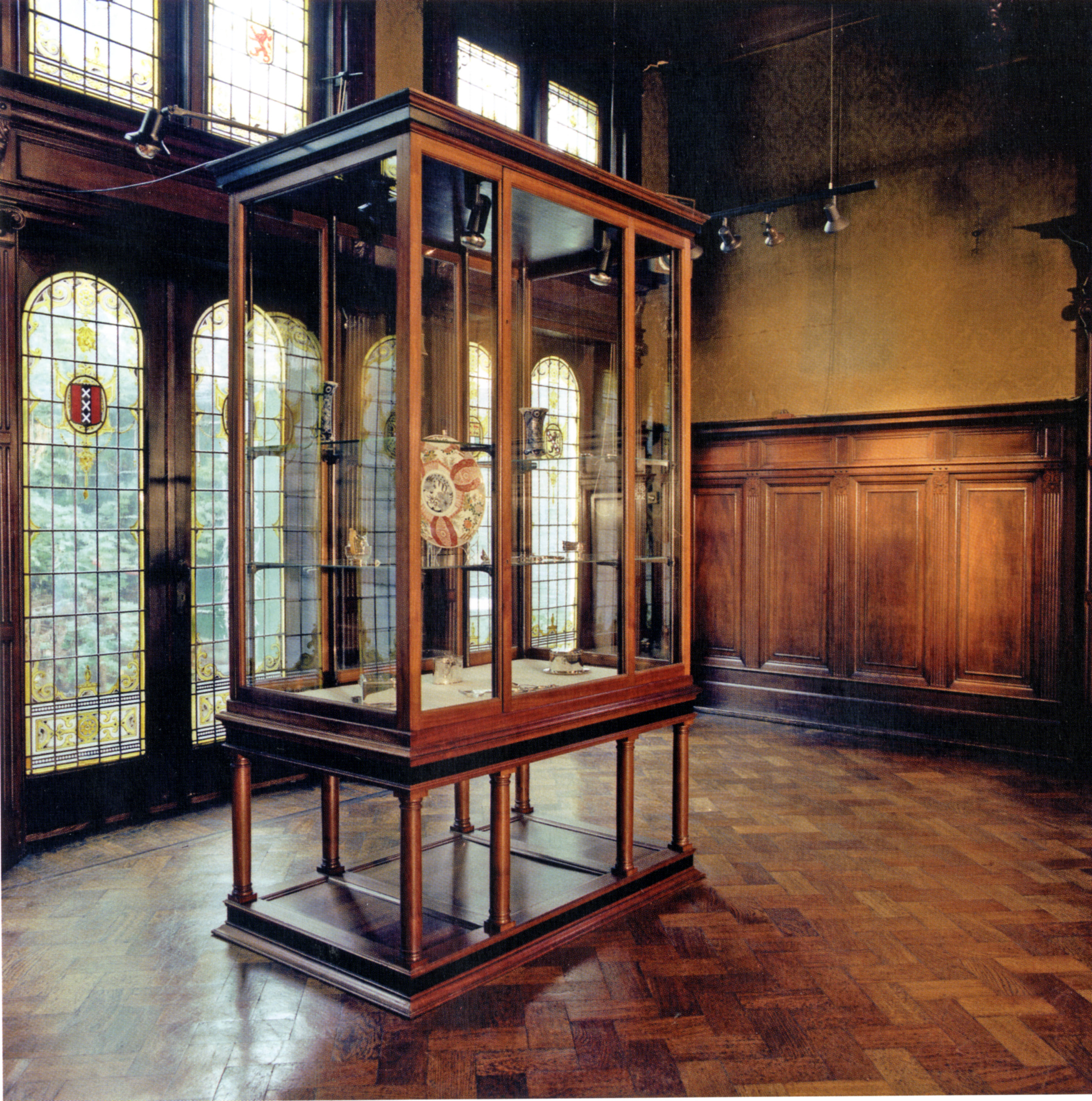
Antique Dutch display case

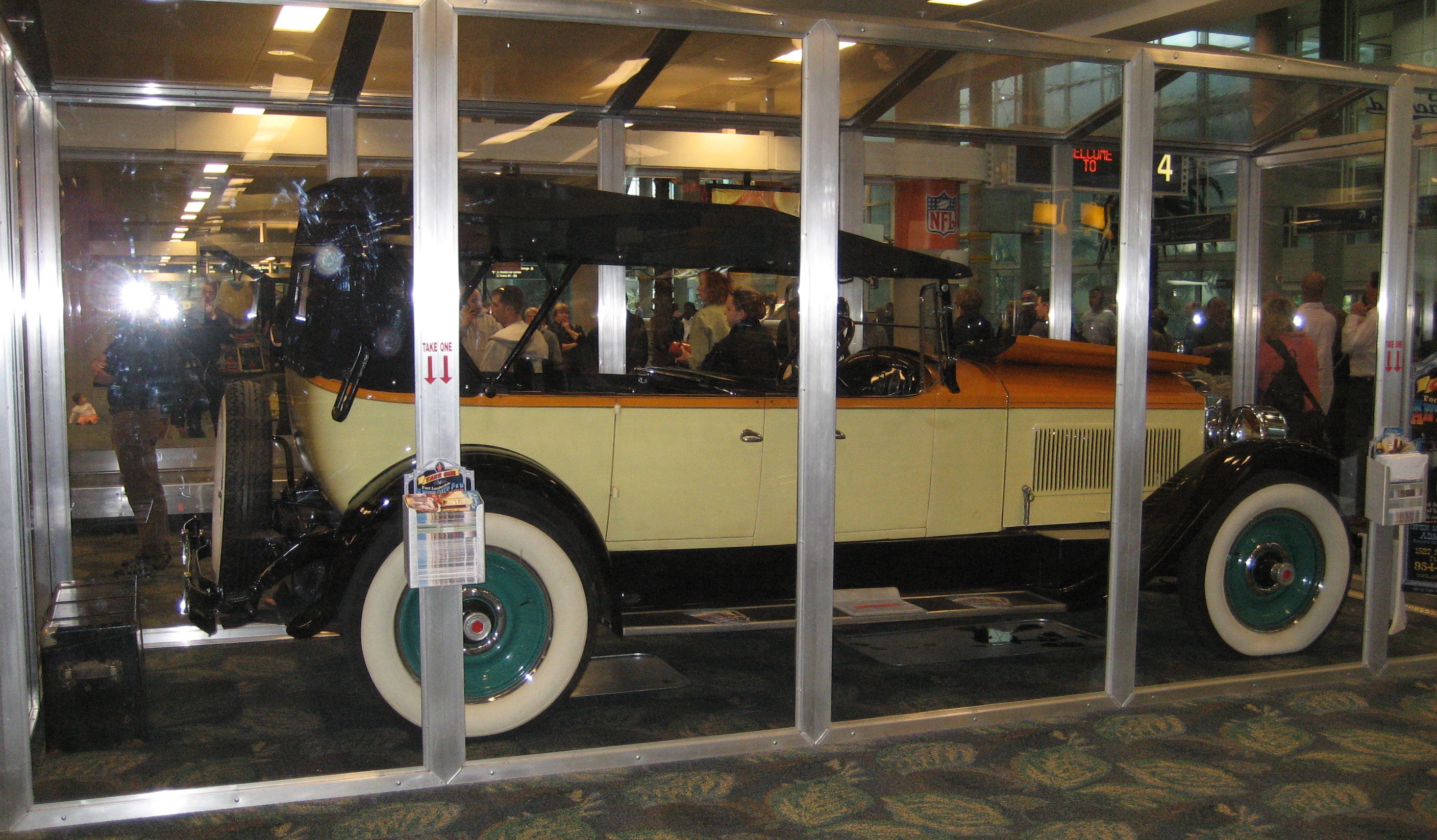
Antique auto protected by display case

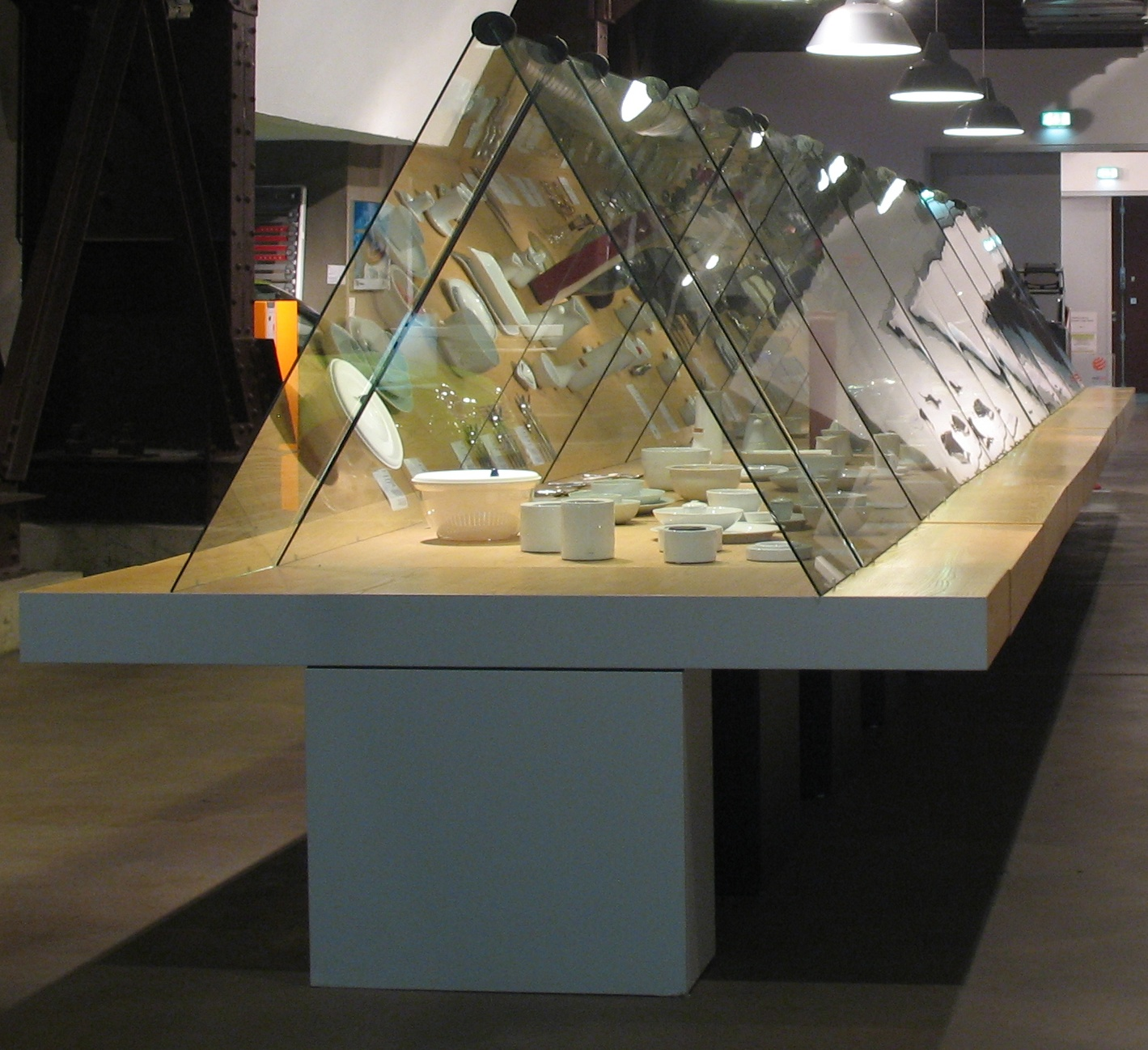
Tent-shaped displays in design museum

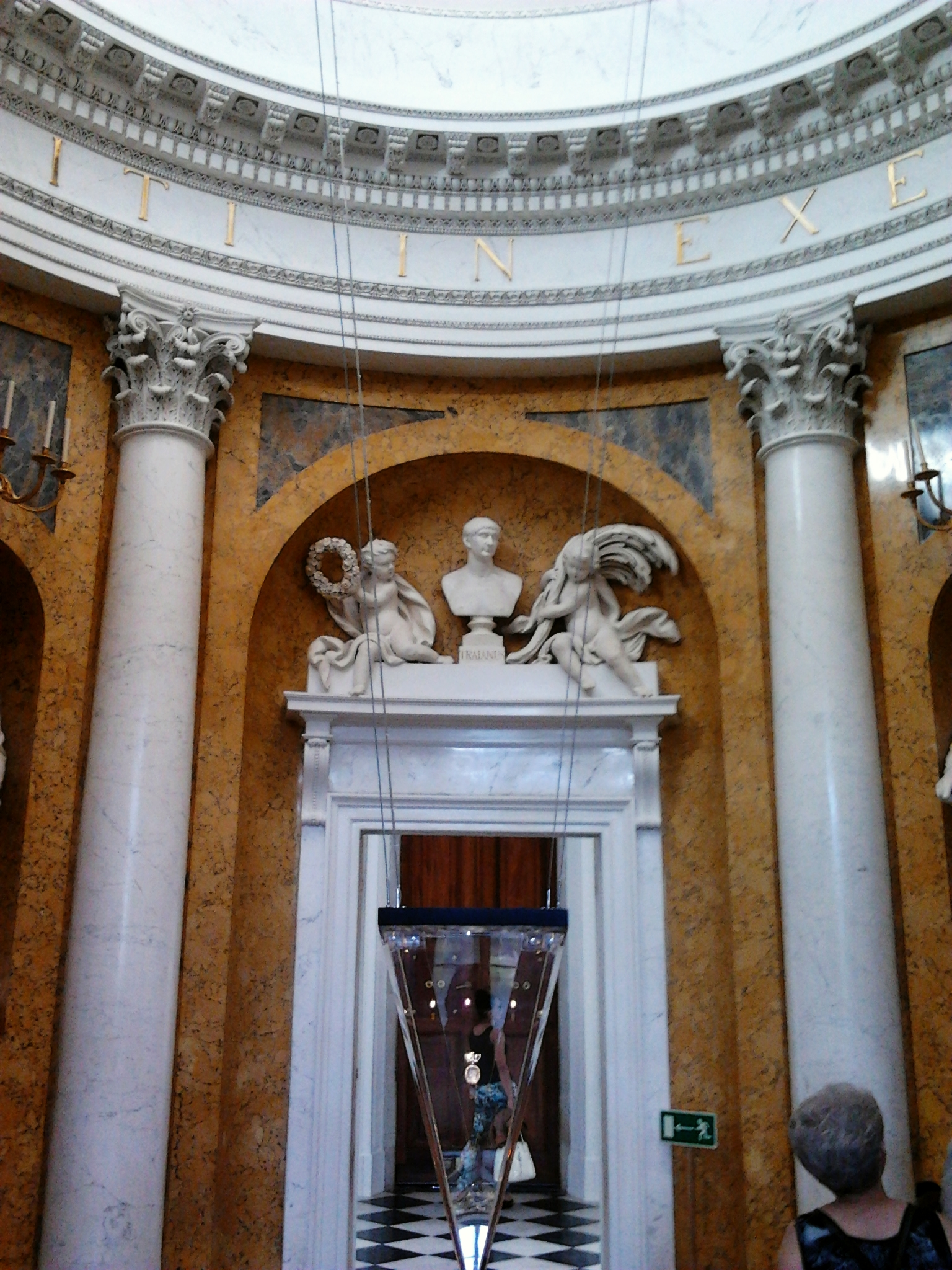
Ceiling-suspended display

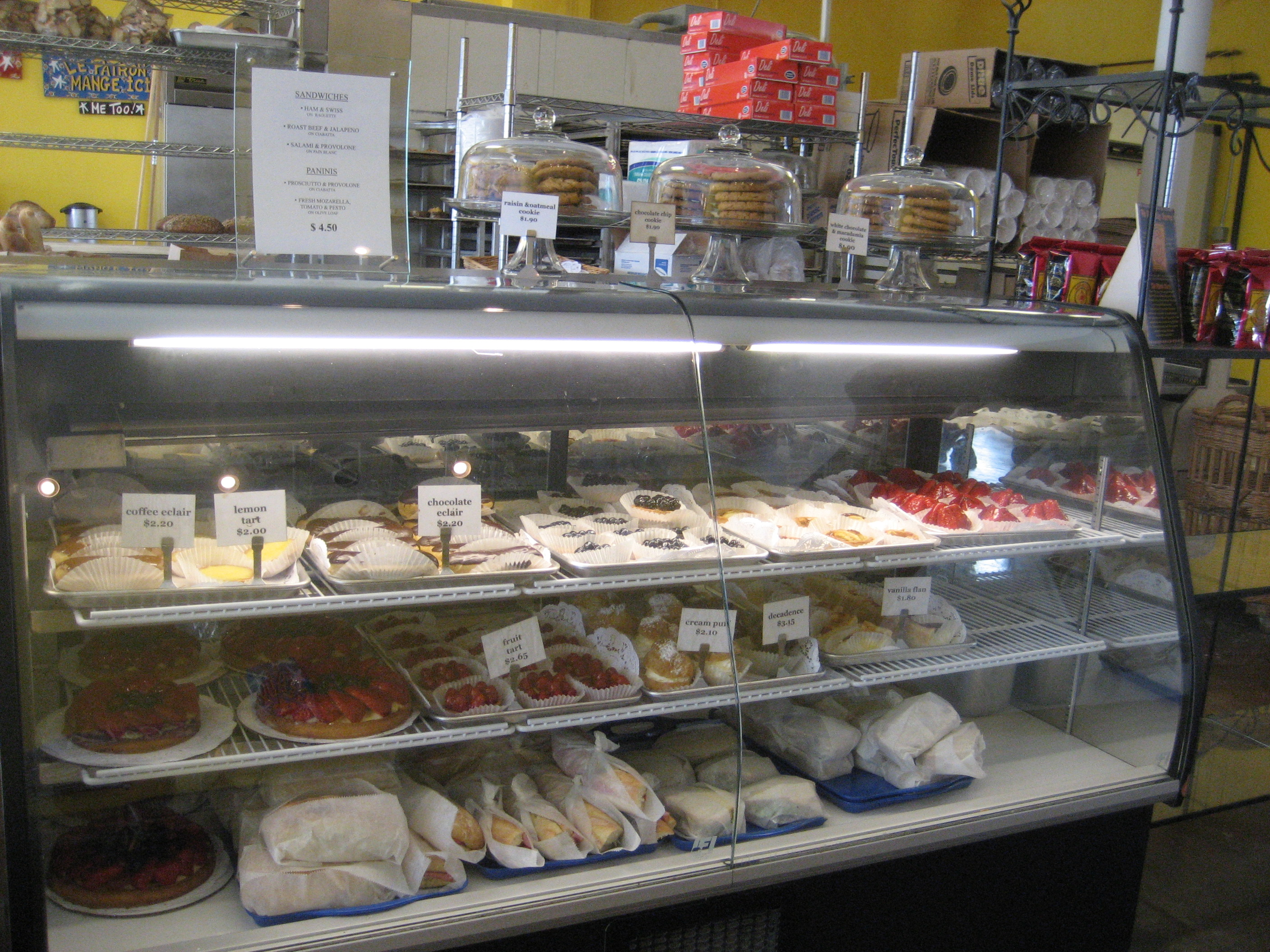
Counter display of baked goods

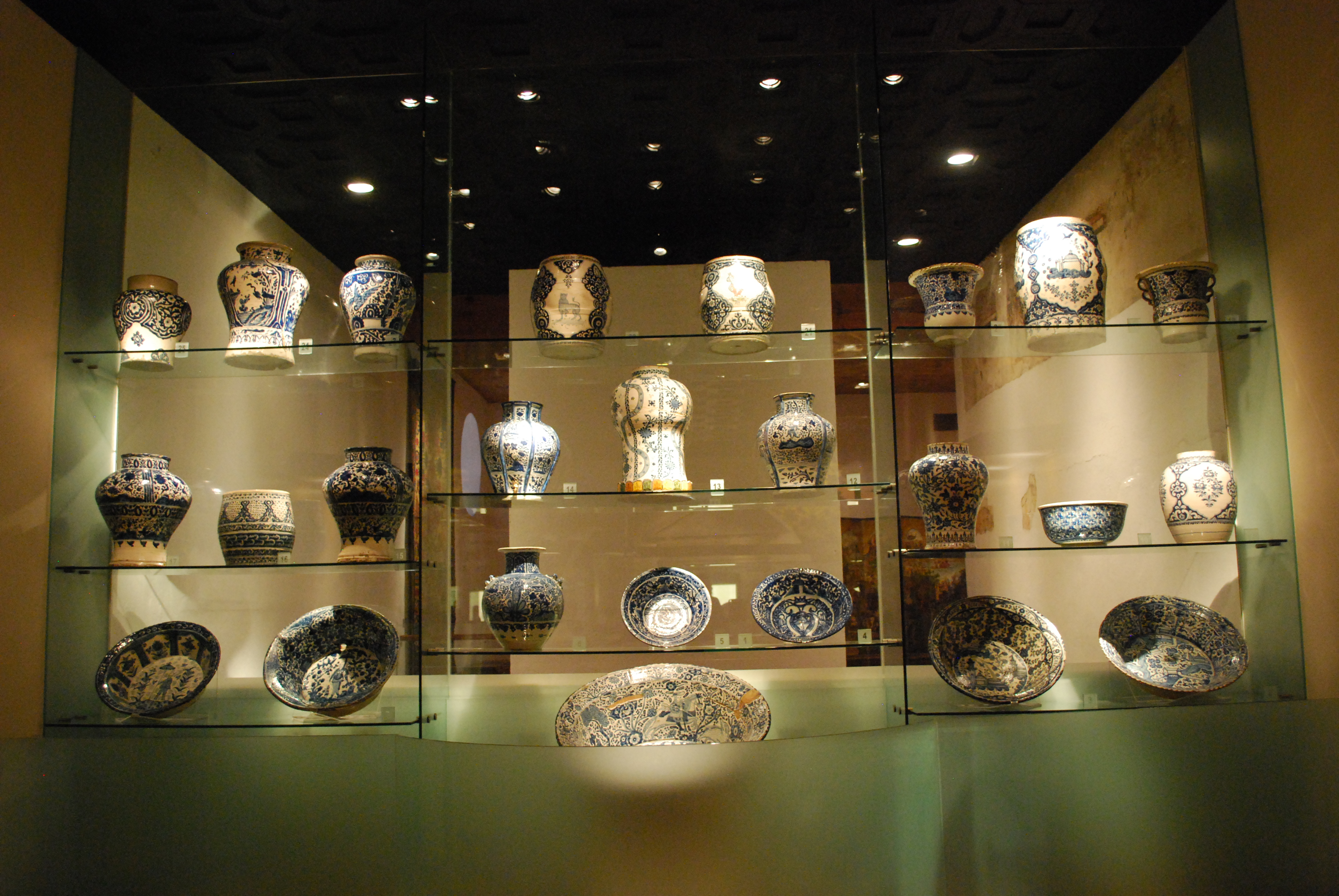
Through-wall transparent display

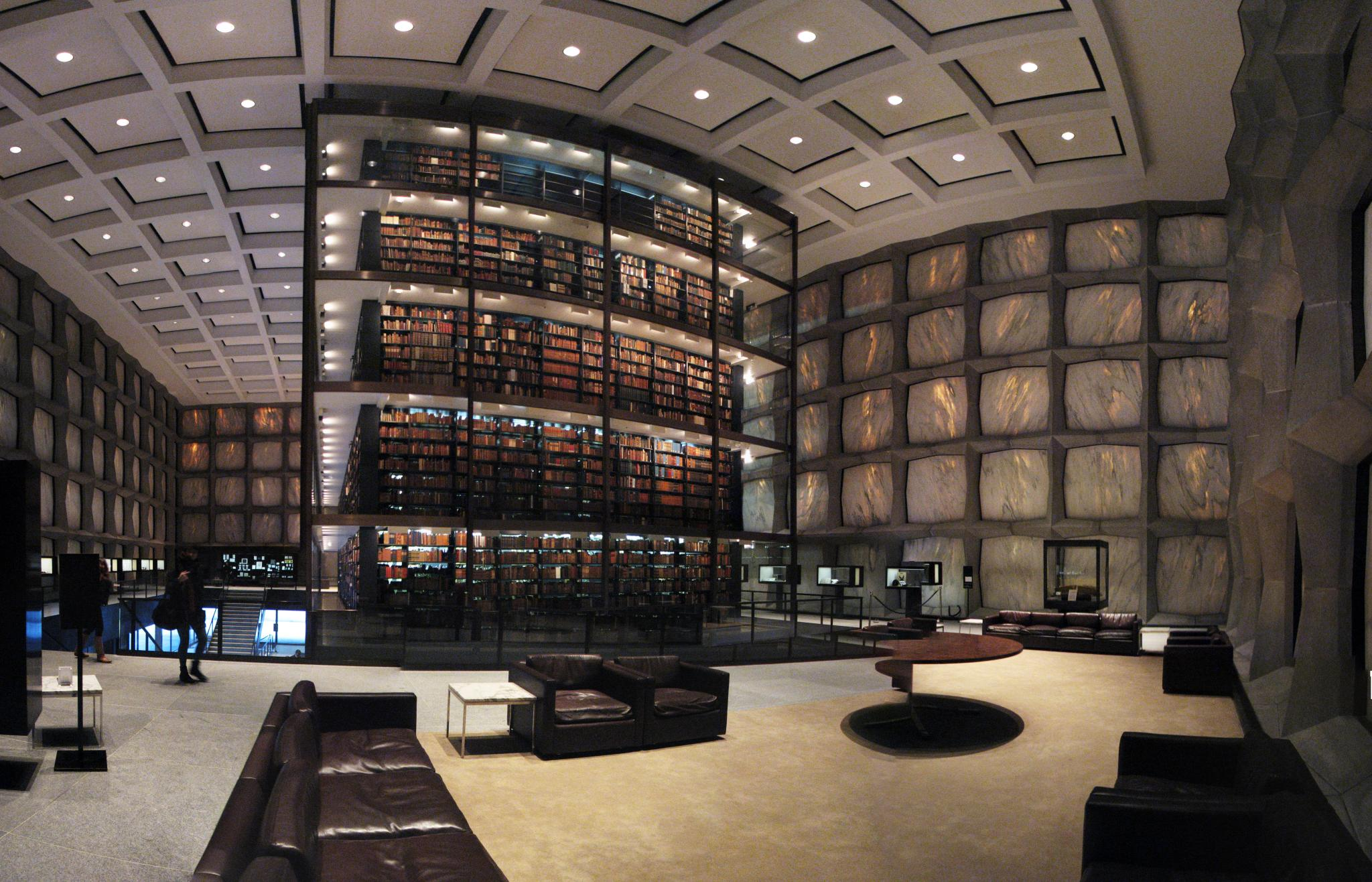
Rare-book library on display

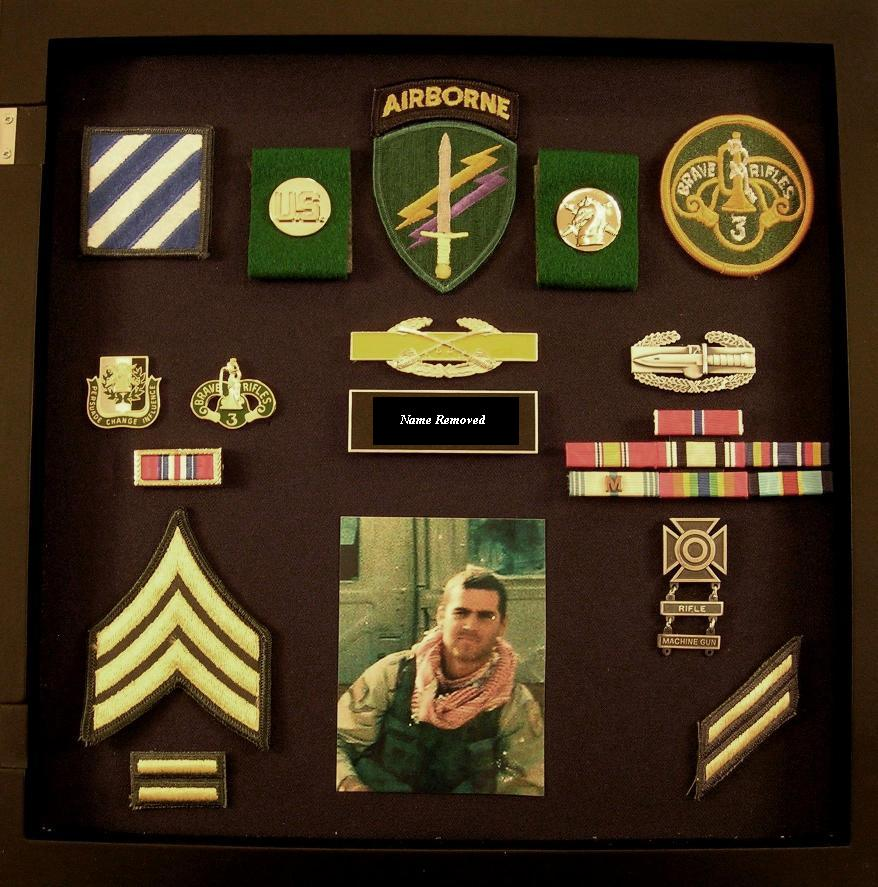
A shadow box for a United States Army soldier who served during the Iraq War

== See also ==
- Automated weather map display
- Box joint, woodworking
- Cabinetry
- China cabinet
- Curio cabinet
- Fillet (picture framing)
- Glass floor
- Picture frame
- Tansu
- Woodworking joints
- Zhuangbiao
