= Lin Aqin =

Taiwanese painter

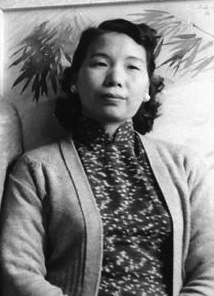
Lin Aqin in 1957

Lin Aqin (Taiwanese Hokkien: Lîm O-khîm; September 29, 1915 – October 8, 2020) was one of the gouache painters active during Taiwan under Japanese rule. She was married to the painter Kuo Hsueh-hu. Lin died in San Francisco, US, on October 8, 2020.

== Life ==
In 1928, Lin Aqin enrolled at Taipei Third High School for Girls (now Taipei Municipal Zhongshan Girls High School), where she studied gouache painting under Gobara Koto, revealing her artistic talent. Through Harada's introduction, she met Kuo Hsueh-hu, and they married in the spring of 1935 in front of the Yuanshan Shrine. To support Kuo Hsueh-hu's artistic career, Lin, who came from a wealthy family, shouldered the heavy responsibilities of raising their children and managing the household finances after marriage. In the 1960s, Lin paused her artistic pursuits to focus on her family. In the 1970s, she moved to the United States. She and Guo Xuehu had four children: Guo Zhenxiang, Guo Songfen, Guo Xiangmei, and Guo Songnian.

== Works ==
Southern Country

Yellow Crotalaria

Lantern Festival - Taiyang Award (1950)

== Film and television works ==
In 2016, the television drama "Purple Dadaocheng" featured Lin Aqin's character portrayed by Fu Xiaoyun.
