= Tsai Shiue-Shi =

Taiwanese artist

Tsai Shiue-Shi (Chinese: 蔡雪溪; Pe̍h-ōe-jī: Chhòa Soat-khe, 1884—?), born during the Japanese colonial period in the Wanhua District of Taipei, Taiwan, was a painter originally named Tsai Rong-Kuan (蔡榮寬; Chhòa Êng-khoan). He was a prominent professional artist in the early 20th century, actively contributing to the art scene in northern Taiwan.

== Life ==
Tsai Shiue-Shi graduated from elementary school in the 34th year of the Meiji era (1901) and worked in various government offices such as the special sales office and the railway department. Apart from self-study in painting, he also learned painting from his colleague at the railway department, Kawada Sumiho (川田墨鳳). In the 9th year of the Taisho era (1920), he moved to Dadaocheng and opened a framing studio called "Shiue-Shi Painting Studio (雪溪畫館)" across from the Yongle Market (永樂市場). With numerous students, he gained fame for his disciples, particularly Guo Hsueh-hu (郭雪湖, originally named Guo Jinhuo, 郭金火) and Ren Ruiyao (任瑞堯). The artistic names "Shiue-hu" and "Shiue-ya" (雪涯) in the art world were given by Tsai Shiue-Shi. Specializing in traditional deity painting, engraving, and framing, Tsai Shiue-Shi was actively involved in poetry societies like the Cuiyingyin Society (萃英吟社), contributing to expanding his patronage sources. Besides Taipei, he held art exhibitions in places like Hsinchu and Chiayi. Between 1931 and 1933, he traveled to southern China for sketching. Before departure, he even organized special sales of his works to fund his trips. His paintings were frequently selected for the Taiwan Art Exhibition (known as "Taiten", 臺展) and the Taiwan Viceroy Art Exhibition (known as "Futen", 府展). In the 11th year of the Showa era (1936), he established the "New Oriental Painting Research Association" (新東洋畫研究會) in Taipingting (太平町).

== Artistic Creation ==
Tsai Shiue-Shi's creative subjects were diverse, initially focusing on traditional Chinese ink styles depicting figures, flowers and birds, and landscapes to meet the demands of the traditional painting market. Later, in pursuit of recognition at official art exhibitions such as the Taiwan Art Exhibition and the Taiwan Viceroy Art Exhibition, Tsai Shiue-Shi's artistic style shifted towards a characteristic of lifelike and meticulous realism based on sketches. This transformation aimed to align with the emphasized themes of local color and sketching in official art exhibitions. His selected gouache paintings showcased a blend of modern sketching concepts with the cultural and local life of Taiwan. However, to make a living, he concurrently continued producing traditional ink paintings of flowers, birds, and landscapes to meet the prevailing demands of the painting market. Among these, his traditional ink paintings of peonies became particularly renowned.
