= Cao Qiupu =

Calligraphy educator

Cao Qiupu (1895–1993) was a calligraphy educator born in Dadaocheng, Taipei City, Taiwan. Born Adan, he later changed his name to Rong; he was also known by the courtesy name Qiupu and the names Lao Xian and Danlu.. He studied calligraphy under masters Chen Zuonian and Zhang Xigun, and following the copybooks of Yan Zhenqing and Liu Gongquan, he developed a style uniquely his own. He was proficient in the four primary styles of calligraphy, particularly clerical script. Over the years Cao took on a large number of students, and came to have a substantial influence on Taiwanese calligraphy. Contemporary calligrapher Zhang Guangbin described Cao as “One of the most outstanding calligraphers of the 20th century and Taiwan’s most influential master of the art in a generation.”

== Biography ==
Cao was born in Dadaocheng in July 1895. At the age of 11 he entered Dadaocheng Public School (now Taiping Elementary School), and at 17 he became a student at Dalongdong Shuren Academy, studying Chinese literature and calligraphy. In 1912, at 18 years old, he set up a private school in Lunling, Guishan, Taoyuan, to teach Chinese literature. In 1915, he established a study salon in Taliaokeng, Guishan, Taoyuan, moving it back to Taipei in 1916 and setting up in Daojian (next to Taipei Bridge), teaching Chinese literature and calligraphy. In 1929, he held a solo calligraphy exhibition in the Governor-General’s Office Museum (now the National Taiwan Museum). In the same year, he established the Danlu Calligraphy Society. Lin Jinfa praised him as a representative figure in Taiwan’s calligraphy world in the book “Taiwan Biographies,” and the following year, Liu Keming praised him as “the most promising young calligrapher in Taiwan” in his book “Taiwan Modern and Ancient.”

Cao Qiupu’s calligraphy works were also recognized in the Japanese calligraphy world. In 1928, one of his piece’s won an award at the first exhibition of the Japan Boshin Calligraphy Association, and his subsequent works were selected many times for the Japanese Calligraphy Exhibition. In 1935, at the age of 41, he served as a member of the Japan Art Association Exhibition Committee. In the same year, he was hired as a calligraphy professor at the Xiamen Academy of Fine Arts. In 1937, he was granted participation in the Japan Art Association without pre-qualification, and in 1941, he moved to Japan and was employed by the academy of Toyama Mitsuru, as well as serving as a lecturer at the Ministry of the Treasury’s Shinseikai Calligraphy Association. After the war, in May 1946, he returned to Taiwan, spending the rest of his life promoting calligraphy education in Taiwan.

In September 1946, he began teaching Chinese at Jianguo Junior High School in Taipei. Two years later, in 1948, he was appointed to the Advisory Committee of the Taiwan Provincial General History Museum (now the Taiwan Archives of the National History Museum). In 1961, he began serving as a teacher with the Shih Chien Calligraphy Research Association, and in 1965, at the age of 71, took up a position as Research Professor at the Institute of Calligraphy at Chinese Culture University.Cao Qiupu served on the judging and review committees for several calligraphy award competitions, including the Taiwan Provincial Educational Art Exhibition in 1968, the Taipei City Art Exhibition in 1972, the Taiwan Provincial Art Exhibition in 1973 and 1974, and the National Art Exhibition in 1977. In 1987, at the age of 93, Cao won the Special Contribution Award at the 12th National Literature and Art Awards.

The Danlu Calligraphy Society, which he founded, was the first private calligraphy association in Taiwan. In 1963, the society held a calligraphy charity sale, the proceeds of which were donated to schools in Sanchong City to build classrooms. The following year, he was honored by the government with the Good People Good Deeds Award
