= JPEGView =

Image viewer format

- JPEGView application icon
- JPEGView version 3.3.1 running on Mac OS X Classic Environment
- Developer: Aaron Giles
- Release: 1991
- Stable release: 3.3.1 / January 1, 1997; 29 years ago
- Operating system: Mac OS
- Type: Image viewer
- License: Postcardware
- Website: www.aarongiles.com/macsoft/index.html

JPEGView is a discontinued image viewer for Classic Mac OS developed by Aaron Giles. Initially released in 1991, it was one of the first JPEG image viewers for Mac OS. The program was also the first example of postcardware, where the software was distributed to the user in exchange for a postcard. Within a decade of offering JPEGView, Giles had received over 6,000 postcards. Giles wrote JPEGView while attending Cornell University Medical College; he later went on to work for LucasArts.

The program supported System 7 and newer and requires QuickTime to run. As well as viewing JPEG files, JPEGView could also convert PICT files to either JFIF files or PICT files employing JPEG compression. It also featured a slideshow mode, something that Apple's own PictureViewer lacked. JPEGView often rendered JPEGs on Macintosh computers better than QuickTime alone owing to its superior dithering and color mapping algorithms when viewing 24-bit color images on 8-bit color graphics cards. JPEGView was the default or recommended helper application for a number of web browsers, including Mosaic, Internet Explorer and Netscape Navigator.

The author has released the source code for JPEGView, although he retains copyright.
