= Chen Jin (painter) =

Taiwanese painter (1907–1998)

Chen Chin
- 陳進
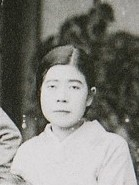
- Born: 2 November 1907; Kōzan, Shinchiku-cho, Japanese Taiwan (modern-day Xiangshan District, Hsinchu, Taiwan)
- Died: 27 March 1998 (aged 90)
- Education: Taihoku Third Girl's High School; Tokyo Women's Academy of Fine Arts
- Occupation: Painter
- Notable work: The Bridal Chamber (化粧) (painting)
- Style: Gouache painting
- Awards: Ensemble was selected for Teiten in 1934.
Chen Jin
Chinese name
- Traditional Chinese: 陳進
Transcriptions
Standard Mandarin
- Hanyu Pinyin: Chén Jìn
- Bopomofo: ㄔㄣˊ ㄐㄧㄣˋ
- Gwoyeu Romatzyh: Chern Jinn
- Wade–Giles: Chʻên^{2} Chin^{4}
- Tongyong Pinyin: Chén Jìn
Hakka
- Romanization: Ciin^{ˇ} Jin
Southern Min
- Hokkien POJ: Tân Chìn
- Tâi-lô: Tân Tsìn
Japanese name
- Kanji: 陳氏進
- Hiragana: ちん し しん
Transcriptions
- Romanization: Chin-shi Shin

Chen Chin (Chinese: 陳進; Pe̍h-ōe-jī: Tân Chìn; November 2, 1907 – March 27, 1998), also written as Ch'en Chin, was a Taiwanese painter, known for her paintings of women (bijin). She is said to be the first Taiwanese woman painter to earn national recognition.

== Life and career ==
Chen was born into an affluent family in Kōzan, Shinchiku, during Japanese rule of Taiwan. Her father was an official in the Japanese colonial government. A patron of the arts, he supported his daughter's pursuit of an artistic education, an unconventional path for women at the time.

Chen studied at the Taihoku Prefectural Taihoku Third Girls' High School, where she painted for the first time. Under the recognition and encouragement of her teacher, Gobara Koto, she went abroad to study painting in Japan. By 1925, she was accepted into the Normal Education Division in Japanese Painting at Tokyo Women's Academy of Fine Arts, becoming the first Taiwanese female artist to study in Japan. She began to study under teachers such as Yuuki Somei and Endou Kyouzou. In 1928, she became acquainted with the Taiwan Art Exhibition juror, Matsubayashi Keigetsu. Through his introduction, she became pupil of the Japanese bijin-ga (美人畫, pictures of beautiful women) painter Kaburagi Kiyokata, and received instruction from Kaburagi’s disciples, Itou Shinsui and Yamakawa Shūhō.

In 1927, the Taiwanese government sponsored the inaugural Taiten, the Taiwan Art Exhibition. Controversially, out of 92 total participants, three unknown 19-year-old artists were the only Taiwanese artists included: Chen, Kuo Hsueh-hu, and Lin Yushan. The trio became known as the "Three Youths in Taiten" and earned significant media attention, launching their careers. Chen's works were regularly selected for subsequent taiten exhibitions, where she won multiple awards. She later served as a juror at the exhibition.

Ensemble (1934)

From 1934 to 1938, Chen taught art at Heitō Girls' High School in Taiwan, becoming the country's first woman high school teacher. During this time, she submitted her artwork to the Teiten (the Japanese Imperial Art Exhibition), and her piece Ensemble (Japanese and Chinese: 合奏) was accepted in 1934, with The Bridal Chamber (Japanese: 化粧, Chinese: 化妝; lit. 'makeup') accepted the following year.

Chen married in 1946, at the age of 39. She had one son; her husband also had six children from a previous marriage.

In 1946, Chen Jin served as a juror for the Taiwan Provincial Art Exhibition while continuing to produce her own work. Making a thematic shift, she produced the works Infant, Little Boy, Children’s World, and Familial Portrait to show the family through the eyes of loving mothers and elderly people. Though she tended to focus on figure painting, Chen Jin also accepted a commission from Taipei’s Fa-kuang Temple which led to the production of her series of The Buddha’s Work (1965-1967).

In 1958, she self-funded her first solo exhibition, showcasing 62 of her works at Chung-Shan Hall in Taipei. In 1986, the Taipei Fine Arts Museum held a retrospective exhibition of her work to celebrate her 80th birthday; the National Museum of History held a retrospective exhibition ten years later.

In her later years, she traveled back and forth between Taiwan and the United States. These experiences led to a thematic expansion in her work, which began to include landscape paintings.

Chen continued to paint until her death in 1998.

== Painting style ==
Chen Jin’s focus was primarily in gouache painting, with a special emphasis on figures paintings. From 1927 onward, she was selected numerous times for the Taiwan Art Exhibition (Taiten); her work Ensemble was selected for the Imperial Art Exhibition (Teiten) in 1934.

Chen's personal style developed gradually. She often explored daily home life and the ideal form of the Taiwanese lady through meticulous brush technique and refined color, in works that reveal the special qualities of elegant ladies from high society. Chen's most famous works exemplifying her style include: Wearing Makeup, Pandanus, Another Day and Quiet Contemplation.

== Legacy ==
Chen is recognized as Taiwan's first prominent woman painter. In 2003, the National Museum of History held an exhibition titled "The Beauty of Chen Chin's Ladies," showcasing 32 of her works dating from 1932 through 1998.

In 2006, in celebration of the 100th anniversary of her birth, the Taipei Fine Arts Museum presented an exhibition titled "Centennial Celebration of Chen Chin" at three Japanese museums: the Shoto Museum of Art, the Hyogo Prefectural Museum of Art, and the Fukuoka Art Museum. It was the largest exhibition of her works to date and the first time a Taiwanese artist's works toured Japan in a major solo exhibition.

A number of Chen's works are held in the Taipei Fine Arts Museum's permanent collection.

== See also ==
- Taiwanese art
