= Taiwan Fine Arts Exhibition =

Art exhibitions in Taiwan (1927–1943)

The Taiwan Fine Arts Exhibition, also referred to as the Taiwan Arts Exhibition, Taiwan Exhibition, or "Taiten" for short, was Taiwan's first large-scale art exhibition. It was held ten times from 1927 to 1936 and was organized by the Taiwan Education Association, an external organization affiliated with the Cultural and Education Bureau of the Governor-General of Taiwan under Japanese rule. In 1937, it was expected that the Government-General of Taiwan would take over organizing the exhibition. However, it was postponed due to the Marco Polo Bridge incident between China and Japan. In 1938, the Government-General of Taiwan organized its first exhibition, and six exhibitions in total were held by 1943. The exhibitions held by the Government-General of Taiwan were called Governor-General's Art Exhibition, or "Futen" for short.

== History ==
The magazine Taiwan Times then published an article by Japanese painter Tōho Shiotsuki, which mentioned that he and other Japanese artists, including Gobara Koto, Kinichiro Ishikawa, discussed the preparation for the Taiwan Art Exhibition near Taipei New Park.

The government's desire to intervene in art exhibitions had important political implications. Since the Taiwan Education Association hosted the Taiwan Exhibition, it was evident that, for the colonial authorities, the exhibition was an educational tool. Minister of Culture and Education Hidehiko Ishida wrote an article before the first Taiwan Exhibition, mentioning that the exhibition "provides hobbies and promotes interests for islanders". To the authorities, the exhibition was a way to "enhance" the cultural standards and tastes of Taiwanese people, ultimately leading to their "assimilation". Promoting Japanese tastes and aesthetics through art exhibitions was intended to train Taiwanese people to become people useful to the Japanese homeland. It was also presented as a way to promote Japan's colonial achievements to the world.

== First exhibition (1927/Shōwa 2) ==
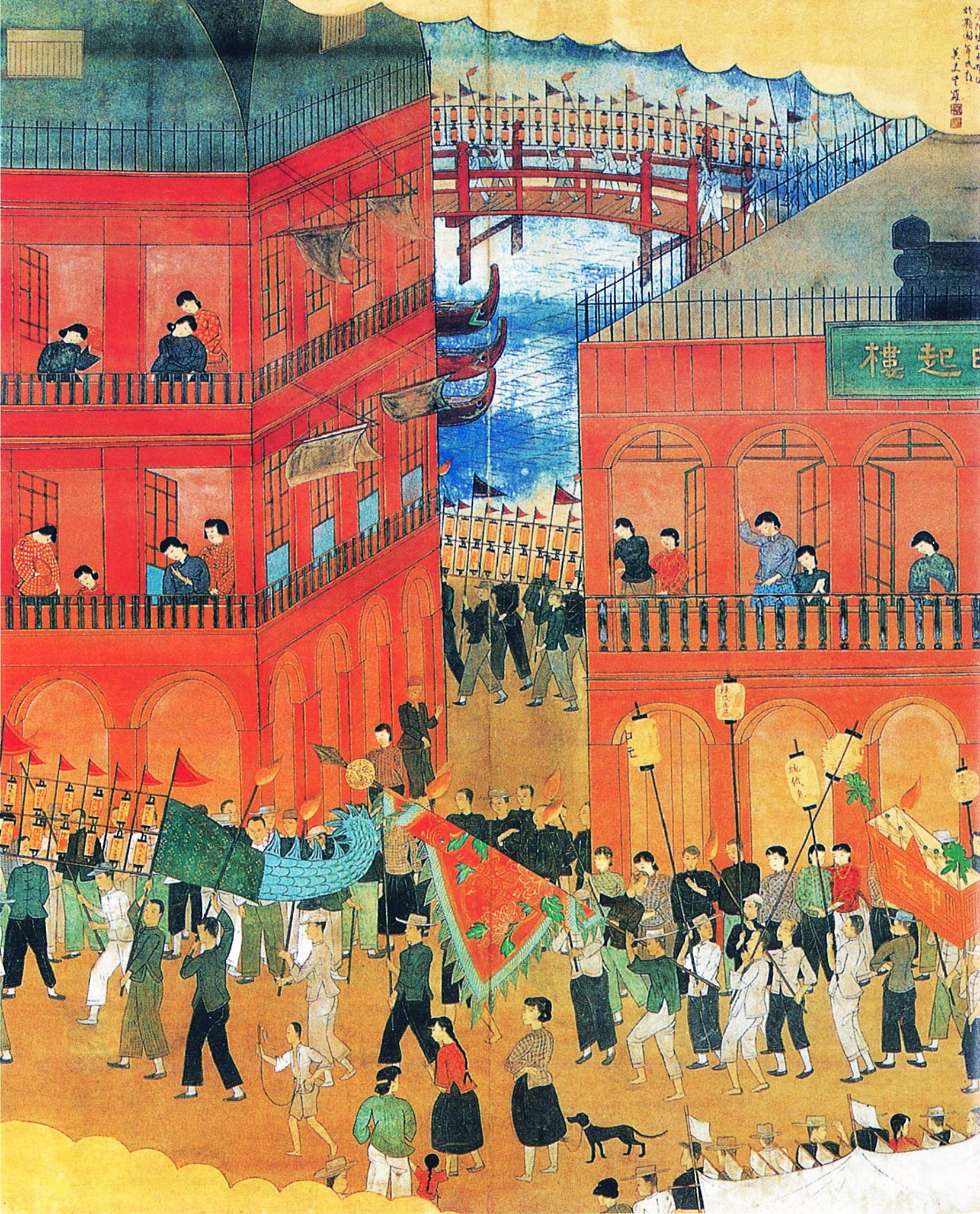
The Ghost Festival in Keelung by Hideo Murakami

Oriental Painting Department

- Special Selection: The Ghost Festival in Keelung by Hideo Murakami
- Examiners: Kinoshita Seigai, Gobara Koto
- No inspection: Hagiya Akiharu (real name Hagiya Tomotsune), Suda Anzai

Many notable painters at the time, such as Tsai Shiue-Shi, Lu Tie-Zhou, Li Xue-Qiao, and Kunishima Suiba, were rejected. Only Chen Jin, Lin Yushan, and Kuo Hsueh-hu were selected among the Taiwanese painters; they were young and relatively unknown at the time. The trio were later known in history as the "Three Youths of Taiten".

This year's special selection, The Ghost Festival in Keelung by Hideo Murakami, depicts Taiwanese local customs, but its art style appears to be an extension of Japanese ukiyo-e. Others, such as Relaxed and Cool by Suda Anzai and Dance of a Hundred Butterflies by Tsunehisa Tokoharu, show characteristics of Japanese painting such as line drawing, delicacy, and heavier application of paint than dyeing.

== Second exhibition (1928/Shōwa 3) ==
Oriental Painting Department

- Special Selection: Scenery Near Yuan Shan by Kuo Hsueh-hu, Nobuki by Chen Jin
- Examiners: Kinoshita Seigai, Gobara Koto, Matsubayashi Keigetsu
- No inspection: Hideo Murakami, Gobara Koto, Kinoshita Seigai, Matsubayashi Keigetsu

== Third exhibition (1929/Shōwa 4) ==
Kuo Hsueh-hu continued with his subtle painting style from previous exhibitions in his work Spring. Kuo's mentor, Tsai Shiue-Shi, had been unsuccessful in the previous two exhibitions, so he decided to ask Kuo Hsueh-hu for advice. Tsai's Autumn Day and Yuanshan was then selected in this exhibition, which became a major topic at the time.

Shi Yushan's Festival of Chaotian Temple followed the popular theme of folk activities and attracted considerable attention for its representation of perspective and depiction of modern elements. Lin Yushan's Chou Lien-hsi was one of the few works that used traditional ink wash.

== See also ==
- Taiwanese art
- Japan Fine Arts Exhibition
