= Kinoshita Seigai =

Japanese painter

- 木下靜涯
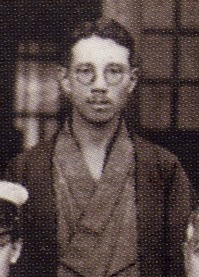
- Kinoshita Seigai in a group photo in 1928 at the 2nd Taiwan Fine Arts Exhibition
- Born: Kinoshita Genjuro; May 16, 1887; Ina, Nagano, Japan
- Died: August 1988 (aged 101); Japan
- Occupation: Painter

Kinoshita Seigai (Japanese: 木下 靜涯; 1887-1988), whose real name was Kinoshita Genjuro (Japanese: 木下 源重郎), with his pen name being Seigai, was born in Komagane, Nagano Prefecture . He was a painter of Japanese paintings of the Kyoto school. He resided and created his works in Tamsui County, Taihaku Prefecture (now Tamsui, New Taipei City) during the Japanese rule of Taiwan for more than 20 years.

== Early life ==
Kinoshita Seigai was born in 1887, in Ina City, Nagano Prefecture. He began to study painting at the age of 12. He was a painter of the Shijo School and joined Takeuchi Seiho Takejokai to learn techniques from different schools of painting.

== Life in Taiwan ==
In 1918, Kinoshita and his painting companions were on their way to observe the cave paintings in India, but they stopped by Taiwan to visit their compatriots. Unexpectedly, one of his painting companions fell ill with typhoid fever, so he voluntarily stayed behind to take care of his companion until he ran out of money and could not return to Japan. While stranded in Taiwan, he fell in love with the scenery of Tamsui County, so in 1923, he settled in a three-story house at No. 26 of Tamsui Street (currently at No. 2, Lane 2, Sanmin Street, Tamsui District), and brought his wife and children to live with him. The former residence of Tamsui Muxia Jingya is a two-story brick and tile-covered building overlooking the Tamsui River. He named this building "Shiwaizhuang".

When Kinoshita lived in Tamsui, he continued to create artworks. He had a romantic and open-minded personality. In addition to painting, he also liked hunting, fishing, playing Go, and drinking. He didn't even know there was a lack of rice in his home. In the 1920s in Taiwan, in 1925, after he held a solo exhibition at the National Taiwan Museum, he successively exhibited paintings of Tamsui landscapes in addition to pastel flower and bird paintings, such as "Wind and Rain," "霁レュク大tun," "Taiwan Rain" Later> etc. After 1934, he often painted Taiwan's mountain scenery, especially Mount Guanyin (New Taipei).

Since 1927, he has served as a review committee member of the Taiwan Art Exhibition and the Taiwan Governor-General's Office Art Exhibition but has never formally recruited disciples. He has served as the Tamsui Street Agreementman since 1932 and has served four to seven terms. Kinoshita Shizua's paintings, such as "Huasu Cliff," "After the Rain in Tamsui," and "New High Mountain," etc. have been printed as postcards in Taiwan. Regarding the views of Taiwanese painters, Kinoshita Shizuka said at the second government exhibition: "Compared to the more ideological works of the Japanese, the Taiwanese people focus on realistic works. Taiwanese painters he influenced include Tan Teng-pho, Li Mei-shu, Lee Shih-chiao, etc. He also organized a painting club in Tamsui, recruiting powerful local people to join the membership, paying membership fees regularly, and giving his paintings to members by lottery every month, which was very important to the development of Tamsui art. Certain influence.

== Repatriation ==
In 1946, due to the forced repatriation policy of Japanese after the handover of Taiwan, Kinoshita returned to Japan and left many of his drawings and books to Cai Yunyan, a private school student. After returning to Japan, he lived in Kokurakita-ku, Kitakyūshū, and mostly taught amateur painters or produced custom works. He also organized the Tamsui Association for more than a thousand Japanese compatriots who had once lived in Tamsui, Taipei. They gathered once a year to discuss about the situation in Tamsui at the time. The association had more than 400 members in its peak, with only a dozen remaining in 2011.

Kinoshita passed away in 1988. He left his last words: "Have good days, good days, good days again."

== Legacy ==
The Taiwan Soka Gakkai, a subsidiary of the Soka Gakkai, has held a series of art exhibitions, "Cultural Roots: Constructing a Centenary History of Taiwanese Art," since 2003. When they wanted to exhibit Kinoshita Seigai's paintings in 2006, they collected relevant information from Cai Yunyan and his family. They discovered that the Cai family had collected 16 catalogs from the Taiwan Art Exhibition and government exhibitions. When Mitsunari Noguchi, director of the Tokyo Fuji Art Museum, came to Taiwan and saw these catalogs, he said there were so many active Japanese artists in Taiwan in the past. Still, the Japanese art world could not know these 16 catalogs due to a lack of information. It just makes up for the history of Japanese art.The New Taipei City Government established a memorial park named after him next to the Mackie Memorial Park on Zhongzheng Road, Tamsui Old Street. The park was opened on October 19, 2011. In 2012, illustrator Liu Yifu published the picture book "A Beautiful Day in Tamsui," introducing Kinoshita Seigai's daily life in Taiwan through pictures.
