= Zhuangbiao =

Chinese art technique

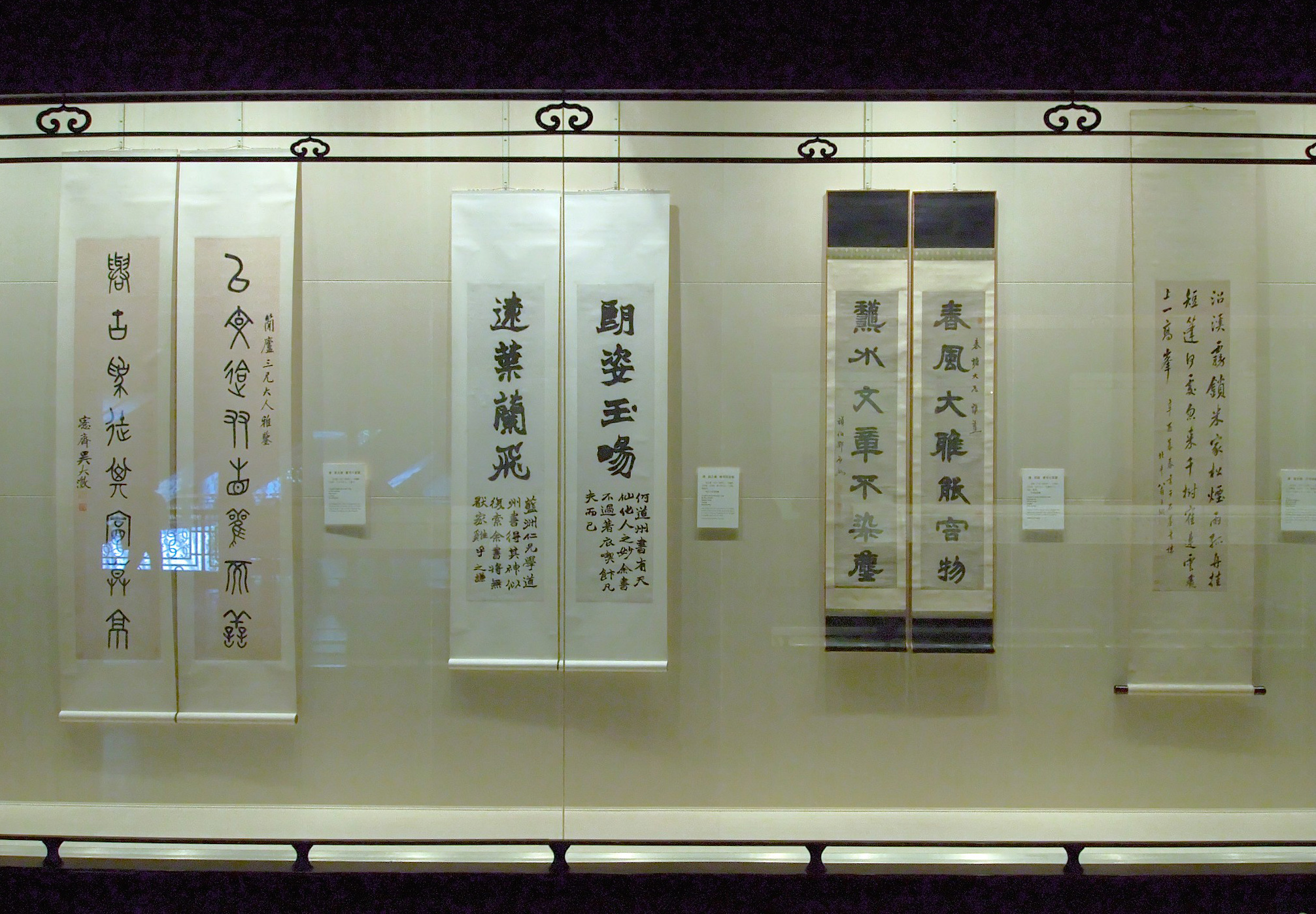
Hanging scrolls, Shanghai

Zhuangbiao (裝裱) refers to mounting or framing techniques for Chinese paintings and calligraphy. These include:

- Handscrolls (卷)
- Codices (冊頁)
- Hanging scrolls (軸)
- Behind glass (鏡片)

Mounting techniques were designated by the State Council of China as a national-level item of intangible cultural heritage (serial 919; number VIII-136) in 2008.
