= Lin Yushan =

Taiwanese visual artist

- 林玉山
- Born: 1 April 1907; Kagi-cho, Japanese Taiwan (modern-day Chiayi, Taiwan)
- Died: 20 August 2004 (aged 97); Taipei City, Taiwan
- Other name: Lin Yinggui (林英貴)
- Education: Kawabata Painting School; Art School Tokyusha
- Known for: Co-Founder of Chang Liu Painting Society
- Notable work: Lotus Pond (painting); Vicissitudes of the Way of Art (book, 1955); A Study of Bird-and-Flower Painting (book, 1964); An Outline of the Beginning of Chinese Painting (book, 1968)
- Style: Oriental painting (gouache), abstraction
Awards
- Water Buffalo and Southern Gate were selected for Taiten in 1927
- Lotus Pond became the first-ever modern painting to receive designation as a national treasure by the Bureau of Cultural Heritage under the Ministry of Culture in 2014
Lin Yushan
- Chinese: 林玉山
Transcriptions
Standard Mandarin
- Hanyu Pinyin: Lín Yùshān
- Bopomofo: ㄌㄧㄣˊ ㄩˋ ㄕㄢ
- Gwoyeu Romatzyh: Lin Yuh-Shan
- Wade–Giles: Lin^{2} Yü^{4}-Shan^{1}
- Tongyong Pinyin: Lín Yù-Shan
Southern Min
- Hokkien POJ: Lîm Gio̍k-San
- Tâi-lô: Lîm Gio̍k-San
Alternative Chinese name
- Chinese: 林英貴
Transcriptions
Standard Mandarin
- Hanyu Pinyin: Lín Yīngguì
- Bopomofo: ㄌㄧㄣˊ ㄧㄥ ㄍㄨㄟˋ
- Gwoyeu Romatzyh: Lin Ing-Guey
- Wade–Giles: Lin^{2} Ying^{1}-Kuei^{4}
- Tongyong Pinyin: Lín Ying-Guèi
Southern Min
- Hokkien POJ: Lîm Ing-Kuì
- Tâi-lô: Lîm Ing-Kuì

Lin Yushan (Chinese: 林玉山; Pe̍h-ōe-jī: Lîm Gio̍k-San; 1 April 1907 – 20 August 2004), originally named Lin Yinggui (Chinese: 林英貴; Pe̍h-ōe-jī: Lîm Ing-Kuì), was a Taiwanese visual artist.

== Early life ==
Lin was raised in a family-owned picture framing store. Lin grew up with an early passion for painting, and his first instructors were folk painters hired by his family. He also spent much of his early years learning from artists such as Tan Ting-pho and Isaka Kyokko.

== Education ==
Between 1926 and 1929, he lived in Japan and studied Japanese painting at the Kawabata Painting School. In 1927, his works Water Buffalo and Southern Gate were selected for the 1st Taiten (Taiwan Fine Arts Exhibition), where, together with Chen Jin and Kuo Hsueh-hu, he became known as one of the "Three Youths of Taiten". After this, he was selected in each subsequent year of the Taiten. His works Lotus Pond, Sugar Cane, and Evening Glow were named as special selections for the 4th, 6th, and 7th Taitens, respectively.

== Work and public life ==
Aside from participating in exhibitions, he also actively participated in various types of painting societies such as Chiayi's Chun-Meng Painting Society (Tainan artist

Pan Chun-yuan also participated the society), Crow Society, Mo-Yang Painting Group, and the Zili Society, as well as Northern painting societies like the "Sandalwood Association" and the "Liguang Society".

In order to advance his art Lin went back to Kyoto to continue advanced studies at Insho Domoto's Art School Tokyusha from 1935 to 1936. During this time, he imitated the styles of Song dynasty painters and became better acquainted with Chinese painting.

Starting in 1938, he drew illustrations for serialized novels in newspapers and popular fiction books. The illustrations for Yang Kui's interpretations of Records of the Three Kingdoms and Journey to the West were among Lin's famous works. His work was also featured multiple times in the Taiwan Governor's Office of Art Exhibition from the years 1939-1942. The following pieces featured were his "Spring of the Island" selection and his piece called "Cow". In 1946, he served as a juror for the Chinese Painting Section of the 1st Taiwan Provincial Art Exhibition.

In 1972, after gouache paintings were removed from the Taiwan Provincial Art Exhibitions, he and some other gouache painters formed the "Chang Liu Painting Society". In addition to his creative work, Lin also contributed to the education of new artistic talents. He taught at Provincial Chiayi Senior High School and Blessed Imelda's School. In 1951, he was hired by the Art Department of National Taiwan Normal University, where he stayed until his retirement in 1977.He was also able to participate in the delegation of professors there.

== Contributions to art ==
Lin promoted en plein air painting, which he considered an important foundation of painting. His work centered thematically on bird-and-flower, landscapes, and figures. Before 1946, most of his works used a fine-brush technique. Afterwards, he shifted toward a more freehand style while continuing to use fine-brush techniques. Among Lin's works, some are characterized by abstraction, such as 1966's Ivy. One notable painting by him called "Way Back Home (歸途) was made during the peak of World War II. It showed a woman with a buffalo carry sugar canes during the Japanese Rule. This very work happened to be one of the few selected for the Tai-Yang Art Association. In addition to his paintings, Lin also wrote reflections on his creative experiences and life as an artist. His written works include 1955's "Vicissitudes of the Way of Art", 1964's "A Study of Bird-and-Flower Painting", and 1968's "An Outline of the Beginning of Chinese Painting".

== See also ==
- Taiwanese art
