= Kuo Hsueh-hu =

Taiwanese painter (1908–2012)

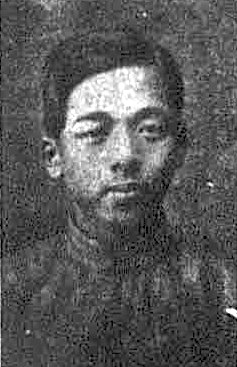
Kuo Hsueh-hu

Kuo Hsueh-hu (Taiwanese: Kueh Suat-ôo, April 10, 1908 – January 23, 2012), born Kuo Chin-huo, was a pioneering Taiwanese gouache painter. He was born in Taipei's Dadaocheng, which was then part of Taiwan's Taipei Prefecture (now Datong District, Taipei City), during the Japanese colonial period. Along with Chen Chin and Lin Yu-shan, Kuo was one of the "Three Youths of Taiten" (referring to the Taiwan Fine Arts Exhibition) and one of the major founders of the Taiwan Provincial Fine Arts Exhibition after World War II.

== Life ==
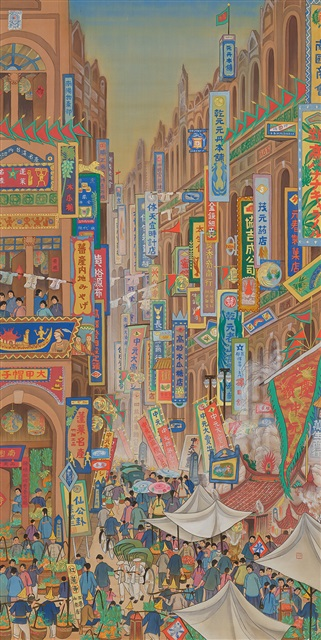
Festival on South Street (1930)

Kuo Hsueh-hu was born in 1908 in Fanzaigou, Datong District, Taipei (now in Datong District, Taipei City). His father died when he was two years old, and his mother Chen raised him alone. In 1917, he entered the Second Public School in Datong District (now Rixin Elementary School in Taipei City) and was discovered by his teacher Chen Yingsheng for his talent in painting. Chen began to teach him art.

After graduating from public school in 1923, Kuo Hsueh-hu attended the Taipei Industrial School (now National Taipei University of Technology) to study civil engineering. Due to a lack of interest in the subject, he dropped out a year later and began to study painting on his own while diligently visiting libraries.

In 1925, his mother introduced him to Tsai Shiue-shi’s " Shiue-shi Painting Studio". Tsai was a famous professional painter at that time and gave Kuo the name "Xuehu". Tsai taught Kuo how to paint images of Guanyin, Emperor and other deities, as well as the skill of mounting paintings, which marked the beginning of Kuo Hsueh-hu's journey into the world of art.

In 1927, the first Taiwan Fine Arts Exhibition was held, and three young and unknown artists, Kuo Hsueh-hu, Chen Chin, and Lin Yu-shan, were selected for the Oriental Painting category. They became known as the "Three Young People of the Taiwan Exhibition" and gained instant fame. Kuo Hsueh-hu's selected work was "Flying Springs in a Pine Valley".

One of the most influential people in Kuo Hsueh-hu's life was the Japanese painter Gobara Koto. Koto was both a teacher and a friend to Kuo, and he urged him to become a professional artist. Kuo took this advice to heart and dedicated his life to art.

== Promoting Taiwan Art Movement ==
Kuo Hsueh-hu founded the first officially registered cram school " Hsueh-hu Art Classroom" approved by the Department of Education in Taiwan. He advocated for cultivating artistic talent, inspiring children's passion for creation, and playing a role in establishing a favorable environment for art and shaping society's aesthetic sense. Additionally, Kuo Hsueh-hu joined several art associations, including the "Zhan-tan Society" and "Liguang Society" of the Oriental Painting Association, as well as the "Liu Yan Society," which promoted both Eastern and Western painting styles.

After the establishment of the "Taiyang Fine Arts Exhibition" (Taiyang Art Exhibition), Guo served as a judge for the Oriental Painting category for many years. In the early post-war period, he and Yang San-lang organized the "Taiwan Provincial Fine Arts Exhibition," and he also served as a review committee member for the "Taiwan Province Student Art Exhibition" and advisor for the "Taiwan Province Teachers' Art Exhibition," among other roles. In 1964, Kuo Hsueh-hu traveled to Japan for research and study and developed his personal artistic creations. He also completed many works and participated in multiple overseas exhibitions in Thailand, the Philippines, India, mainland China, and the United States.

In 1978, Kuo Hsueh-hu and his wife Lin Achin settled in the Richmond district of San Francisco, California. In 2007, at the age of 99, Kuo Hsueh-hu was awarded the 27th Executive Yuan Cultural Award. In 2008, the National Museum of History and the National Taiwan Museum of Fine Arts held separate retrospective exhibitions of Kuo Hsueh-hu's important works. In 2010, the Taiwan Soka Association organized an exhibition titled "Three Youths of Taiwan Fine Art Exhibition: Chen Chin, Lin Yu-shan, and Kuo Hsueh-hu."

On January 23, 2012, Kuo Hsueh-hu died at the age of 103 in his home in San Francisco, California.

== Personal life ==
His wife, Mrs. Lin Achin, was also a painter and a student of Gobara Koto, who supported and contributed to Kuo Hsueh-hu's artistic career. Their children have also achieved success in the fields of art education and literature. Their eldest son, Kuo Song-fen, is a literary figure, their eldest daughter, Kuo Chen-shiang, is deeply engaged in art education, and their third daughter, Komi Chen, and second son, Song-nian, are both adept at painting.
