= Taipei Municipal Zhongshan Girls High School =

- 臺北市立中山女子高級中學

Location
- No.141, Chang-an E. Rd. Sec. 2., Zhongshan District, Taipei City 104, Taiwan (R.O.C.); Taipei, Taiwan; 25°2′57″N 121°32′16″E

Information
- Type: Public
- Motto: 誠、篤、敏、慧 (Sincerity, Integrity, Curiosity and Wisdom)
- Established: 1897
- President: Wu Liqing
- Enrollment: 2872 (in 2012)
- Campus: Urban
- Color: Red
- Website: http://www2.csghs.tp.edu.tw/

Taipei Municipal Zhongshan Girls High School (Chinese: 臺北市立中山女子高級中學; pinyin: Táiběi shìlì Zhōngshān Nǚzǐ Gāojízhōngxué, abbreviation as ZSGH or CSGHS) is a public girl's high school located in the Zhongshan District of Taipei, Taiwan. The school enrols female students from grade 10 to 12. Established in 1897 during the Japanese period, the school marked the milestone of secondary education for Taiwanese females and has educated many famous alumnae including Taiwan's first female president, Tsai Ing-wen.

== History ==
=== Empire of Japan ===
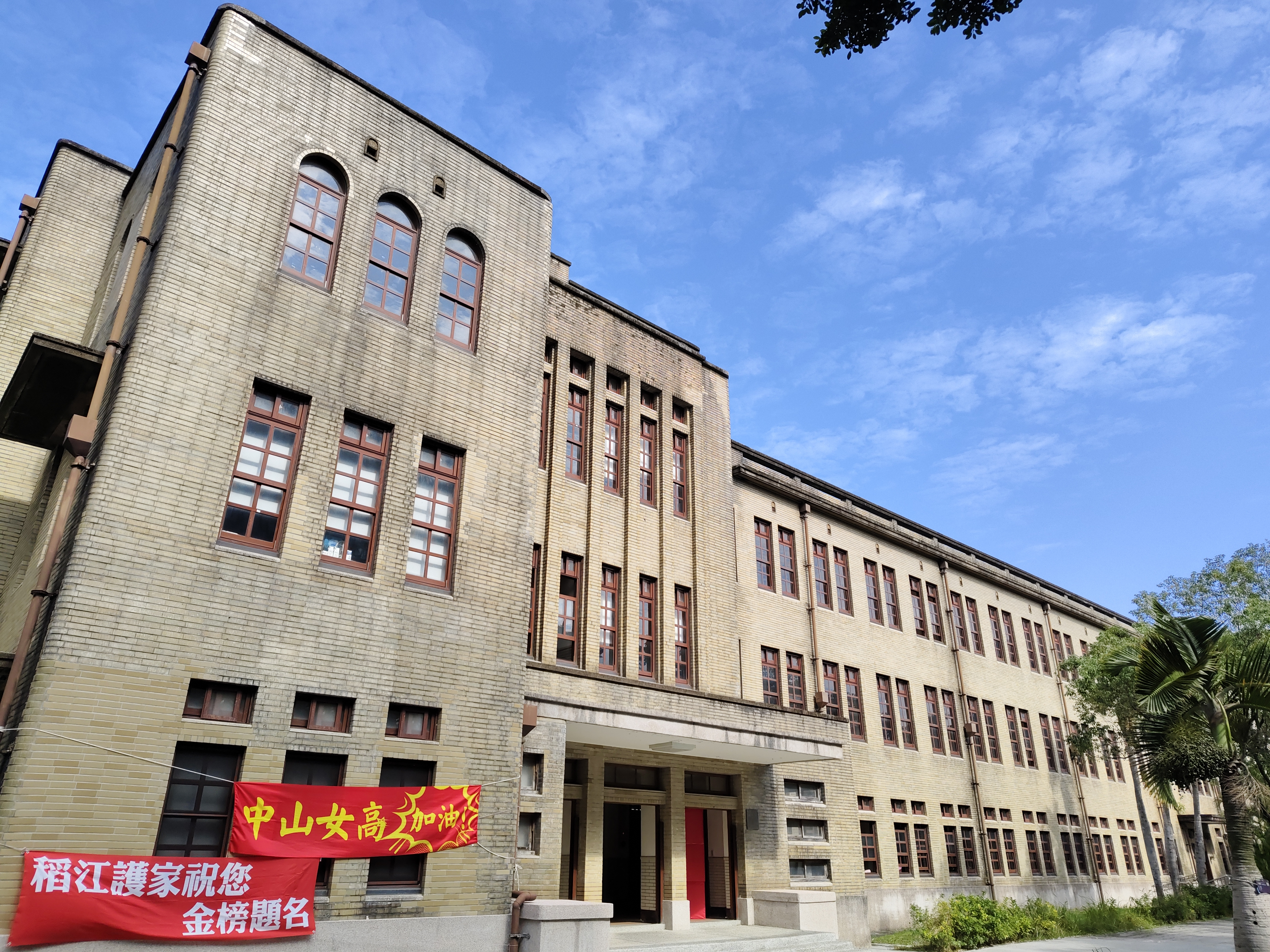
The main building (now Yat-Sen Building)

Initially named First Girls' Affiliated Japanese School of the Governor-General of Taiwan (Japanese: 臺灣總督府國語學校第一附屬學校女子分教場), the school was first located in modern-day Shilin District, Taipei in 1897 as the first public school for Taiwanese female students. In 1911, the school was relocated to Manka (Wanhua District) and underwent several name changes. During this early period, main subjects in the curriculum included Japanese language and handicraft art. More subjects were provided after the 1900s such as etiquette, home economics, arithmetic, music, calligraphy, painting and, Physical Education lessons.

In 1922, Japanese Government in Taiwan launched its second education reform (臺灣教育令) that encouraged to provide Japanese and Taiwanese students equal opportunity for secondary education. The school was thus renamed as Taihoku Prefectural Taihoku Third Girls' High School (台北州立台北第三高等女學校) and started a more formal secondary education structure targeting female students from grade 10 to 12. More academic subjects were also added into the curriculum during this period. In 1937, the school was relocated to the current address. The first building of the new campus (now Yat-Sen Building) was built in 1936 and is still in use today.

=== Republic of China ===
In 1945, Taiwan was handed over from Japan to the Republic of China. Under the ruling of the new Republic of China government, the school was renamed as Taiwan Provincial Taipei Second Girls' High School (臺灣省立臺北第二女子中學) on 8 December 1945. This date became the school's anniversary which is still celebrated today. Japanese and related lessons were deleted from the curriculum while subjects like civil rights, Chinese language and culture were added and emphasized. During this period the school's student union, Chinese drama club, Western drama club, and basketball team were famous national-wide.

Since 1960, the former school building and dormitory grounds now currently houses the Legislative Yuan and its administrative offices, formerly located in Nanjing when the central government was transplanted to Taipei in 1949.

In 1968, the school was renamed after the revolutionary leader Sun Zhongshan as Taipei Municipal Zhongshan Girls High School, commonly known in English as Sun Yat-sen.

== Curriculum ==
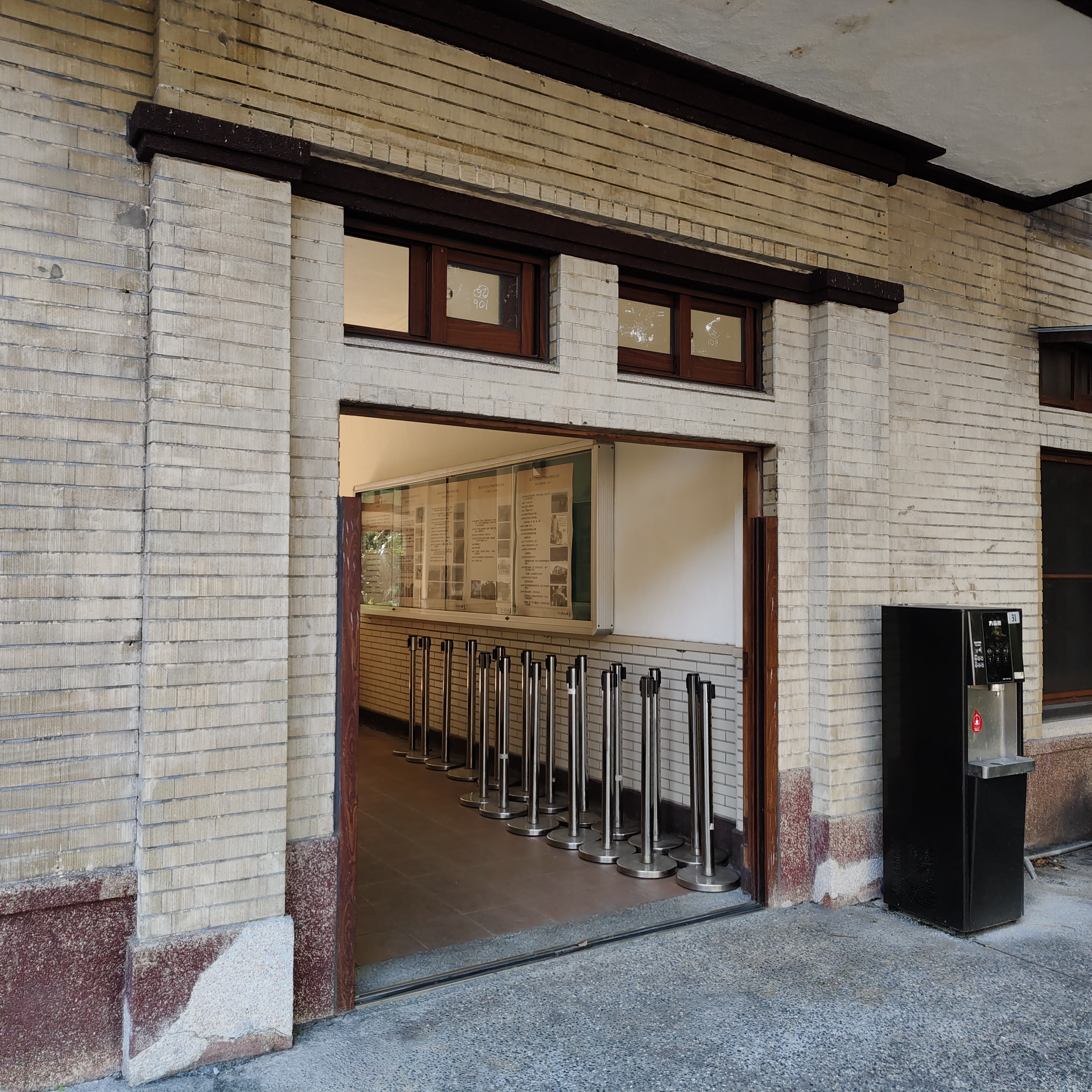
Door of Taipei Municipal Zhongshan Girls High School

160 credits are required for graduation. A credit is given after 18 hours of learning, however the number of credits for subjects vary according to the learning hours.

=== Schedule ===
Class subject distribution differs with each grade level. For example, 11th graders have 16 subjects in one semester, about 36 hours a week.

- Four to five hours a week: Chinese, English, math
- Two hours a week: history, geography, citizen and society, earth science, chemistry, art, PE, home economics
- One hour a week: weekly meeting, class weekly meeting, club time, music, military training

=== Gifted classes ===
Gifted classes are slightly more flexible.

==== Humanities and Social Sciences Class ====
Students the Humanities and Social Sciences Class have to take some other courses, such as politics, economics, philosophy, social studies, etc.

==== Math and Science Class ====
Subjects offered through the Math and Science Class include advanced biology, advanced chemistry, advanced physics etc. The members of this class are part of a science competition team and compete against students from other schools.

== Notable alumni ==
- Tsai Ing-wen, Taiwan's first female president
- Hsu Hsin-ying, founder and chairperson of Minkuotang (2015–2018)
- Hung Hsiu-chu, Chairperson of Kuomintang (2016–2017)
- Chu Tʽien-wen, Taiwanese writer
