= List of Taiwanese artists =

The following list of Taiwanese artists (in alphabetical order by last name) includes artists of various genres, who are notable and are either born in Taiwan, of Taiwanese descent or who produce works that are primarily about Taiwan.

== C ==
- Chang Wan-chuan, painter 張萬傳
- Chang Yi-hsiung, painter 張義雄
- Chen Cheng-po, oil painter 陳澄波
- Chen Chih-chi, painter 陳植棋
- Chen Ching-fen, painter 陳清汾
- Chen De-wang, painter 陳德旺
- Chen Houei Kuen, painter 陳慧坤
- Chen Hsia-yu, sculptor 陳夏雨
- Chen Jin, painter 陳進
- Chen Long-bin, sculptor 陳龍斌
- Chen Tzu-fu, film poster artist
- Chen Shu-ming, multimedia artist
- Chen Uen, illustrator 鄭問
- Chen Xue jun, painter 陳雪君

== H ==
- Ho Te-Lai, painter 何德來
- Huang Ching-cheng, sculptor 黃清埕
- Hai-Hsin Huang, painter
- Huang Tu-shui, sculptor 黃土水
- Hung Jui-lin, painter 洪瑞麟

== I ==
- Kinichiro Ishikawa, painter and pioneer of art education in Taiwan 石川 欽一郎

== J ==
- James Jean, Taiwanese-American painter

== K ==
- Kuo Hsueh-hu, painter 郭雪湖
- Kuo Po-Chuan, painter 郭柏川

== L ==
- Jun T. Lai, sculptor, painter
- Lee Shih-chiao, oil painter 李石樵
- Lee Tze-fan, oil painter 李澤藩
- Li Mei-shu, painter and sculptor 李梅樹
- Liao Chi-chun, oil painter and sculptor 廖繼春
- Jimmy Liao, illustrator 幾米
- Lin Aqin, painter 林阿琴
- Lin Jinhong, painter 林錦鴻
- Selena Lin, manhua artist 林青慧
- Lin Yushan, painter 林玉山
- Liu Chi-hsiang, oil painter 劉啟祥
- Lu Tie-Zhou, painter 呂鐵州

== N ==
- Ni Chiang-huai, watercolor painter 倪蔣懷

== P ==
- Pu Tiansheng, sculptor 蒲添生

== Q ==
- Qiu Jinlian, painter 邱金蓮

== R ==
- Ran In-ting, watercolor artist 藍蔭鼎

== S ==
- Shen Che-Tsai, oil painter 沈哲哉
- Cindy Shih, Taiwanese-american artist
- Tōho Shiotsuki, painter of Taiwanese sceneries and indigenous people 塩月桃甫

== T ==
- Tan Teng-pho, painter and politician 陳澄波
- Teng Ming-Tun, painter 鄧明墩
- Tsai Shiue-Shi, painter 蔡雪溪

== W ==
- Wang Baiyuan, poet, painter and art critic 王白淵
- Suling Wang, painter 王淑鈴
- Weng Kun De, painter 翁崑德
- Nymphia Wind, winner of RuPaul's Drag Race season 16 妮妃雅‧瘋

== X ==
- Xie Lifa, writer and painter 謝里法

== Y ==
- Yang Maolin, artist 楊茂林
- Yang Qi-dong, watercolor artist and oil painter 楊啟東
- Yang San-lang, painter 楊三郎
- Ye Huocheng, oil painter 葉火城
- Yen Shui-long, sculptor, mosaic artist 顏水龍

== Z ==
- Zhang Qihua, painter 張啟華

== See also ==
- List of Taiwanese people
