= Lin Chih-chu =

- 林之助; Lîm Chi-chō͘
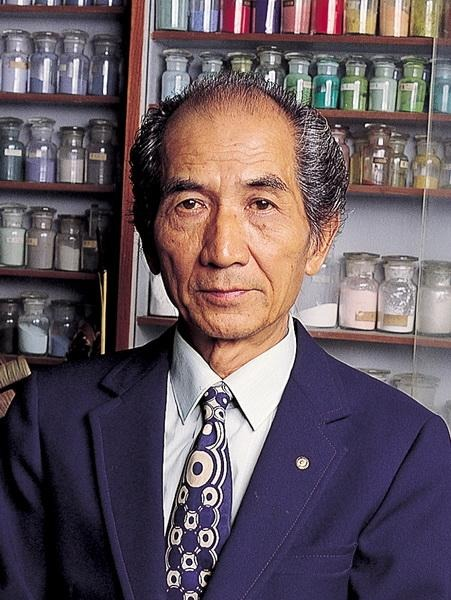
- Lin Chih-chu
- Born: February 2, 1917 (Taiwan) Baodong Xiabao, Huludun Branch Hall, Taichū Chō
- Died: February 13, 2008 (aged 91) (United States) Los Angeles, California
- Citizenship: Japan → Republic of China
- Education: Teikoku Art School
- Occupation: Painter
- Spouse: Wang Tsai-chu
- Children: 4

Lin Chih-chu (Chinese: 林之助; February 2, 1917 – February 13, 2008), a native of Daya, Taichung, Taiwan (now Daya District, Taichung City), was a Taiwanese painter known as the "Father of Taiwanese Nihonga." In his early years, Lin Chih-chu participated in exhibitions in Japan and Taiwan, with his works primarily focusing on portraits and scenes of daily life. In his later years, he shifted his focus to paintings of flowers, birds, and landscapes.

== Early life ==
Lin Chih-chu was born in Shangfeng Village, in present-day Daya District, Taichung City. Lin Chih-chu's grandfather, Lin Wei-xiu, was a Qing Dynasty scholar (xiucai), and he grew up in an affluent household. Gifted with natural intelligence, Lin showed great promise from a young age. Though his parents hoped he would study medicine, he chose instead to follow his passion for painting.

At age 12, he went to Japan to study; he was later admitted to the Imperial Art School of Japan (now Musashino Art University in Tokyo), where he trained under artists such as Okumura Togyu (1889–1990), Yamaguchi Hoshun (1893–1971), Kawasaki Shoko (1886–1977), and Kobayashi Suju.

At the age of 24, Lin Chih-chu's work Morning Cool was selected for Japan's "2600th Imperial Year Commemorative Art Exhibition." With the outbreak of the Pacific War, Lin returned to Taiwan in 1941. His works were later featured in the "Taiwan Governor-General's Exhibition," where he consecutively won first place in the special selection category, establishing his prominence in the art world.

During his time in Japan, Lin Chih-chu also explored a wide range of artistic interests, including tap dancing and playing the shamisen.

== Art style ==
In 1928, Lin Chih-Chu traveled to Japan to study nihonga (Japanese-style painting), focusing on gouache techniques. He participated in exhibitions such as the Nihon Bijutsuin (Japan Art Academy) Exhibition and the Shin Bunten (New Art Exhibition). After returning to Taiwan in 1941, he continued to take part in major exhibitions, including the Government-General Exhibitions and the Taiwan Provincial Art Exhibitions. Up until the early 1950s, his works predominantly centered on portraiture.

In the late 1950s, Lin transitioned to focusing primarily on bird-and-flower paintings and landscapes. During the mid-1950s, his style began to shift, with his subjects and forms becoming increasingly simplified. Influenced by the trend of "Westernization of Japanese-style painting," he embraced the creative philosophies and techniques of 20th-century Western masters, pioneering new directions in gouache painting. Starting in the 1970s, Lin Chih-Chu's style gradually returned to a more realistic approach. Although the volume of his work decreased in his later years, his style became increasingly refined and mature.

In addition to painting, Lin Chih-Chu also created works in pattern design, primarily designing covers for art textbooks. He also left behind many sketches and drafts. In 1964, Lin Chih-Chu created a mural for the lobby of the Tainan Grand Hotel, which no longer exists today. In 1969, Lin Chih-Chu designed two murals for the walls of the Taichung Municipal Seventh Junior High School (now Taichung Municipal Dongfeng Junior High School). The works were created using mosaic techniques, with Lin personally supervising his student, Hsieh Feng-Sheng, during the construction. The murals, blending figurative and abstract elements, symbolized the era's spirit, marked by the landing of American astronauts on the moon. They aimed to inspire students to value space exploration and cultivate a broad cosmic perspective.

Following the devastating 921 Earthquake in 1999, one of the murals was destroyed, leaving only one intact. At the time of their creation, neither the designer's nor the builder's names were included on the works. However, on May 29, 2006, with Lin Chih-Chu's consent, a plaque was installed beside the remaining mural, providing details about the piece and officially naming it Moon Landing.

== Naming and promoting gouache painting ==
Like other Nihonga painters, Lin Chih-Chu was troubled by the debate over the definition of traditional Chinese paintings during the early period after the relocation of the Nationalist government to Taiwan. Following the war, Lin served as a juror in the Chinese Painting Division for the Provincial Art Exhibitions. However, Japanese-style paintings were exhibited under the title "Chinese Painting, Section II," which seemed to place them in a subordinate position compared to ink wash painting. Despite this, Lin remained steadfast in his commitment to the in-depth exploration and promotion of the Nihonga painting style.

To support the development of Taiwanese Nihonga painting, in 1971, Lin Chih-Chu, together with Lin Yu-Shan, Chen Chin, Huang Ou-Po, and Chen Hui-Kun, established the "Changliu Painting Society." However, after Japan severed diplomatic ties with Taiwan in 1972, the Provincial Art Exhibition unexpectedly abolished the "Chinese Painting, Section II" (which was essentially the Japanese Painting Division). Lin Chih-Chu actively worked to address this issue, and in 1977, he proposed the term "gouache painting," which was formally adopted for use in exhibition titles. In 1981, Lin, together with Lin Yu-Shan, Chen Chin, Hsu Shen-Chou, and Tsai Tsai Cao-ju, founded the "Taiwan Provincial Gouache Association," with Lin serving as its chairman. Finally, in the 37th Provincial Art Exhibition in 1983, gouache painting was established as an independent category.

In 1946, Lin Chih-Chu was invited to teach art at the Taiwan Provincial Taichung Normal School (now National Taichung University of Education), where he served until 1979. Notable artists such as Tseng Teh-Piao, Shih Hua-Tang, and Huang Teng-Tang were among his students. After retiring, Lin was appointed in 1985 as an adjunct professor in the Department of Fine Arts at Tunghai University, where he continued to teaah gouache painting. In 1988, Chan Chien-Yu took over the gouache training and actively promoted the art form to neighboring universities and introduced it into graduate programs. Scholars such as Chuang Ming-Chung and Tseng Teh-Piao have stated that, despite the decline of gouache painting after the war, its survival and current development owe much to Lin Chih-Chu's contributions.

== Later in life ==
After World War II, Lin Chih-chu began teaching at Taichung Normal School (now National Taichung University of Education) in 1946 and was involved in the compilation of art textbooks. In addition to teaching and creating art, Lin Chih-chu opened a café in Taichung in the mid-1960s, which became an important cultural venue for artistic and literary activities in central Taiwan.

To enhance the quality of art in the region, Lin co-founded the Central Taiwan Art Association in 1954 with Yen Shui-long, Chen Hsia-yu, and others. For many years, he remained a pivotal figure in the central Taiwan art scene. In 1979, Lin Chih-chu retired from Taichung Normal School. From 1985 to 1988, Lin Chih-chu was invited by Chiang Hsun, then chair of the Fine Arts Department at Tunghai University, to serve as a part-time instructor in Nihonga. He was the first to introduce gouache painting education into Taiwan's academic art institutions, an initiative that gradually influenced other fine arts departments and continues to expand its impact today.

In 1988, Lin Chih-chu moved to the United States with his son. After moving to the United States, Lin Chih-chu continued to create art, participate in exhibitions, and travel between Taiwan and the United States. Lin died on December 13, 2008, in Los Angeles, USA.

== Legacy ==
In July 2007, the Taichung City Cultural Affairs Bureau designated Lin Chih-Chu's studio as a historical building. On May 7, 2015, Lin Chih-Chu's Morning Cool, housed in the collection of the National Taiwan Museum of Fine Arts, was officially designated as an important cultural artifact of the Republic of China by the Bureau of Cultural Heritage. On June 6, 2015, after the renovation of Lin Chih-Chu's studio and its surrounding areas was completed, it was officially opened to the public as the "Lin Chih-Chu Memorial Hall."
