= Yang Qi-dong =

Taiwanese painter

Yang Qi-dong 楊啟東
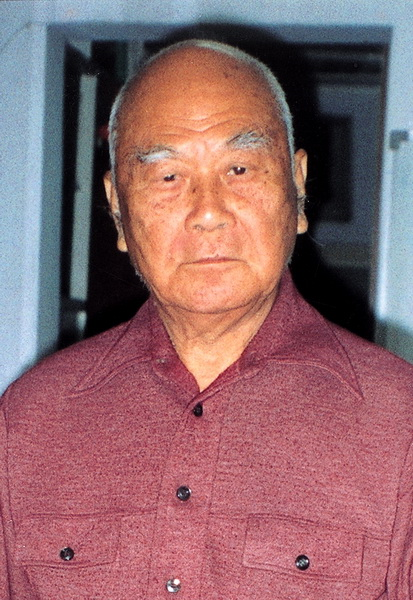
- Born: November 8, 1906; Taichung Prefecture, Huludun Subprefecture
- Died: July 5, 2003 (aged 96); Republic of China (Taiwan)Taipei City
- Education: Taipei Normal School of the Taiwan Governor-General's Office
- Occupation: artist

Yang Qi-dong (Chinese: 楊啟東) (November 8, 1906 – July 5, 2003) was a watercolor artist, oil painter, educator, and art critic from Fengyuan, Taichung City, Taiwan.

== Development ==
Yang Qi-dong was born in 1906 in Zhenliao, Fengyuan, Taichung County. During his time at Huludun Public School, he self-studied haiku, waka, short poetry, and modern verse. In 1918, he published works in Youth Magazine. Subsequently, he enrolled in the Fine Arts Department of the Taipei Normal School under the Taiwan Governor-General's Office Taipei Normal School under the Taiwan Governor-General's Office, studying under Ishikawa Kinichiro to lay the foundation for his painting skills.

After graduating in 1925, unlike most of his peers who went to Japan for further studies, Yang Qi-dong was unable to do so due to setbacks in his father Yang Wanshou's grain and timber business. Instead, he purchased Japanese art publications for self-study. In the same year, he took a teaching position in art at Beitun Public School (now Beitun Elementary School, Beitun District, Taichung City). In October 1927, Yang's watercolor painting The Timber Pond at Dusk was selected for the inaugural Taiwan Fine Arts Exhibition (also referred as Taiten). In 1928, his work Stranded Boat was chosen for the Western Painting Division of the second Taiwan Art Exhibition. Over the years, he was selected for Taiten and Futen ten times and also served as a juror for art exhibitions at Taichung Prefecture schools. After 1928, Yang was transferred to teach at Wufeng Public School (now Wufeng Elementary School in Wufeng District, Taichung City). In 1931, he began teaching at Fengyuan Public School (now Fengyuan Elementary School in Fengyuan District, Taichung City) and married Chen Xiu in the same year.

After the war, Yang Qi-dong continued teaching art at the Provincial Taichung Commercial Vocational School (now National Taichung University of Science and Technology) for 18 years. During this time, he mentored several artists, including Zhao Zongguan, Luo Xiuxiong, You Chaohui, Ji Huiming, and Shi Chunxiao, leaving a profound impact on the art scene in central Taiwan.In 1954, Yang co-founded the Central Taiwan Art Association alongside other artists such as Lin Zhi-zhu, Yan Shui-long, Chen Xia-yu, Ye Huo-cheng, and Hong Kong-da. The association held annual member exhibitions and open art competitions. Additionally, in 1976, Yang established the Spring and Autumn Art Society with Ma Chao-cheng and Luo Xiuxiong. In 1977, he founded the Central Watercolor Society and actively participated in organizing exhibitions like the Central Art Exhibition, contributing significantly to the promotion of arts in the Taichung region.

After retiring, Yang Qi-dong continued to reside in the school dormitory on Linsen Road in Taichung City's West District, maintaining his habit of painting from life. In 2000, Yang donated a lifetime collection of his artworks to National Taiwan University through his second son, Yang Wei-zhe, who was a professor in the university's Department of Mathematics. On December 22, 2000, the "True Passion and Romance: Yang Qi-dong Masterpiece Exhibition" was held to showcase his works.

Yang Qi-dong died in July 2003 in Taipei at the age of 98. In 2004, National Taiwan University donated 775 of his works to the National Taiwan Museum of Fine Arts for its collection. In 2010, the Taichung City Cultural Affairs Bureau and the Taichung City Cultural and Educational Foundation jointly held the "Lonely Warrior of Taiwan's Art Scene: Yang Qi-dong Memorial Exhibition" at the Taichung City Hall.

== Style ==
Yang Qi-dong primarily focused on watercolor painting in his early years but later transitioned to oil painting, developing a distinctive style with opaque watercolors. His artistic journey can be divided into three phases. His subjects included flowers, nightscapes, temples, Hundred Beauties, and Hundred Sceneries. He also experimented with traditional Chinese painting and calligraphy.Yang's works are significant for their detailed documentation of Taiwan's rural and cultural landscapes from the 1930s to the post-war period, making him a key figure in the local art scene. He excelled at using opaque watercolors to convey a rustic and substantial atmosphere. Additionally, Yang frequently published art-related critique articles in magazines and journals.

Yang Qi-dong created many paintings of Han-style temple architecture. His works were selected five times for the Japan Taiheiyō Art Exhibition, three times for the São Paulo Art Biennial in Brazil, and six times for the Salon des Artistes Français in France. Among his achievements, his 1965 work Pottery Kiln won the bronze medal at the Salon des Artistes Français.
