= Weng Kun De =

Taiwanese painter

Weng Kun De (Chinese: 翁崑德; Pe̍h-ōe-jī: Ang Khun-tek, March 19, 1915 – March 21, 1995) was a Taiwanese painter born in Chiayi.

== Life ==
Weng Kun De was born into an affluent gentry family in Yunxiao House, Beimen, Chiayi City, Taiwan. His father, Weng Yaozong, and mother, Ms. Chen, both came from prominent families in Chiayi and were involved in the transportation and construction industries. They valued arts and culture and placed great importance on their children's education. Weng Kun De was the second son in the family. Along with his elder brother, Weng Kun Hui, who was two years his senior, he received strong support from his parents to pursue studies in Japan. Both brothers attended the literature department of Ritsumeikan University in Kyoto, where they developed a shared interest in literature, painting, and Budō. After graduating, Weng Kun Hui enrolled in the martial arts department of Ritsumeikan University, while Weng Kun De continued his studies in the university's literature department. Additionally, the brothers studied painting together at the Nishiyama School of Painting in Kyoto and the Kyogoku Western Painting Institute.

In the late 1930s, Weng Kun De returned to his hometown after completing his studies. At just 20 years old, his Western painting The Street Full of Life was selected for the 9th Taiwan Provincial Art Exhibition (Taiwan Exhibition). Subsequently, his work Scenery with a Tower was featured in the Taiyang Art Exhibition (1936), Station was selected for the 1st Governor-General's Exhibition (1938), and his depiction of Chiayi Park, Morning, was included in the 5th Governor-General's Exhibition (1942). After the war, Weng continued to actively participate in exhibitions and was selected for the Provincial Art Exhibition 11 consecutive times.

After being selected for numerous Provincial Art Exhibitions, Weng Kun De, now in middle age, decided to leave the stage to younger artists. Coupled with a decline in his creative output, he shifted his focus to local arts and cultural activities. In 1935, Weng Kun De, Lin Yingjie, and Chang Yi-hsiung held a joint "Three-Person Western Painting Exhibition" at the Chiayi Village hall. Under the guidance of senior local painter Tan Teng-pho, they brought together other young artists from the Chiayi area, such as Weng Kun Hui and Liu Xinlu, to establish the Qingchen Art Association in August 1940. The association held its first exhibition that same year.However, the wartime regime disrupted their activities, and after the death of Tan Teng-pho, who was implicated in the February 28 Incident of 1947, most members of the Qingchen Art Association ceased painting or left their hometowns. Weng Kun De, however, continued to submit his works to the Provincial Art Exhibitions. In addition to becoming a member of the Taiyang Art Association, he accepted an invitation from Shen Che-tsai to join the Tainan Art Research Society in 1959. There, he consistently exhibited two to three works annually and was honored with the title Light of the Nankaikai in 1986 for his contributions.

Weng Kun De remained unmarried throughout his life. Participating in exhibitions and research activities with the Tainan Art Research Society was one of his key commitments during his later years. However, after completing Serene Mountains, Long Days in 1984, he suffered a stroke due to overwork, which left him physically impaired and unable to produce new works. Following this, he moved to Tainan, where he was cared for by his younger sister Weng Bi Yan, his adopted son and nephew Weng Hong Zhang, and his nephew's wife Hong Xiu Mei. Weng Kun De died on March 21, 1995.
