= Asa Matsuoka =

Japanese philanthropist (1893 - 1980)

Asa Matsuoka 松岡朝
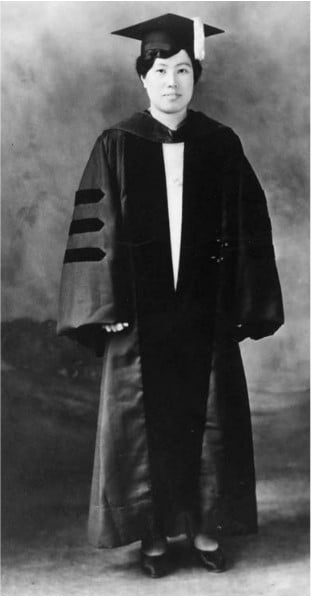
- Dr. Asa Matsuoka, PhD, Columbia, 1932
- Born: 11 July 1893; Kyōbashi, Tokyo
- Died: 16 October 1980 (aged 87); Uchisaiwaicho, Tokyo
- Other names: Asahi Matsuoka; Akemi Matsuoka
- Occupation: Social Worker
- Known for: Chairman of UNICEF Japan
- Spouse(s): Masatsugu Suzuki (m. 1914; div 1918)
- Parents: Kenichi Matsuoka (father); Sachi Matsuoka (mother)

Asa Matsuoka (松岡朝, Matsuoka Asa; 1893-1980) was a Japanese philanthropist and cultural ambassador best known as the founder and first chairman of the UNICEF National Committee for Japan. She was born in Kyōbashi-ku, Tokyo (now part of Chuo-ku), on 11 July 1893, and was the first Japanese woman to earn a PhD from an American university.

== Early life and education ==
Born in 1893 (Meiji 26), Asa was the third daughter of Kenichi Matsuoka, a successful merchant in Tokyo known for donating to build a bridge between Fujisawa and the tidal island of Enoshima. Kenichi embraced the concept of Bunmei Kaika or the contrast between Japan's traditional roots infused with a new Western veneer.

Kenichi believed in gender equality and raised his family liberally, sending Asa and her sisters to Kyoritsu Girls' School and providing them with English tutors, while her mother Sachi insisted on a traditional Japanese education in chado, ikebana, shamisen, and Japanese culture, which would serve Asa well in her later overseas travels.

When Asa was 21, her younger brother Kengo died as a result of complications from injuries sustained at Mt Fuji. Asa would remember her father's promise to her brother, telling him that he would devote his life to the welfare of children, and encouraged Asa to follow the same path. That same year, Asa would marry an influential bureaucrat, Masatsugu Suzuki, whom she would divorce 3 years later due to irreconcilable differences. Asa would relate that her dream to continue her studies proved to be the separation point in their relationship.

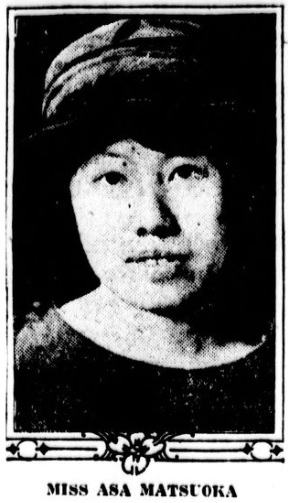
Asa in 1922

Emboldened by the passage of the 19th Amendment in 1920, Asa would seek sponsorship from the Woman's Christian Temperance Union, then prominent for their support of universal suffrage, and board a ship bound for America to attend Northwestern University in 1922.

Completing remedial studies at Northwestern, Asa began attending Barnard College at Columbia when the Great Kanto earthquake struck Tokyo in 1923. Asa's family's business suffered from the resulting economic downturn and was unable to afford the cost of tuition. Asa, determined to complete her studies, decided to sell her kimono and jewelry. Luckily, she consulted with a trusted friend who introduced her to a collector of Japanese art who would lead to an introduction to Bashford Dean of the Metropolitan Museum of Art. Dean was impressed by Asa's knowledge of traditional Japanese arts, and hired Asa to identify and catalog their growing collection in Japanese Art.

Obtaining a master's degree from Barnard in 1927, Asa returned to Japan to prepare for her PhD and was invited to speak at the Tokyo National Museum, gaining the attention of Princess Shoko, the granddaughter of Iwakura Tomomi, whose family were longtime patrons of cultural exchange and international education, and who led the diplomatically significant 1871 Iwakura mission.

After spending a year in Japan, Asa returned to the US to complete her doctoral dissertation. Her dissertation, Labor Conditions of Women and Children in Japan, would be published by the US Department of Labor, earning Asa the distinction of the first Japanese woman to not only earn a PhD, but to be published in the United States.

== Cultural ambassador ==
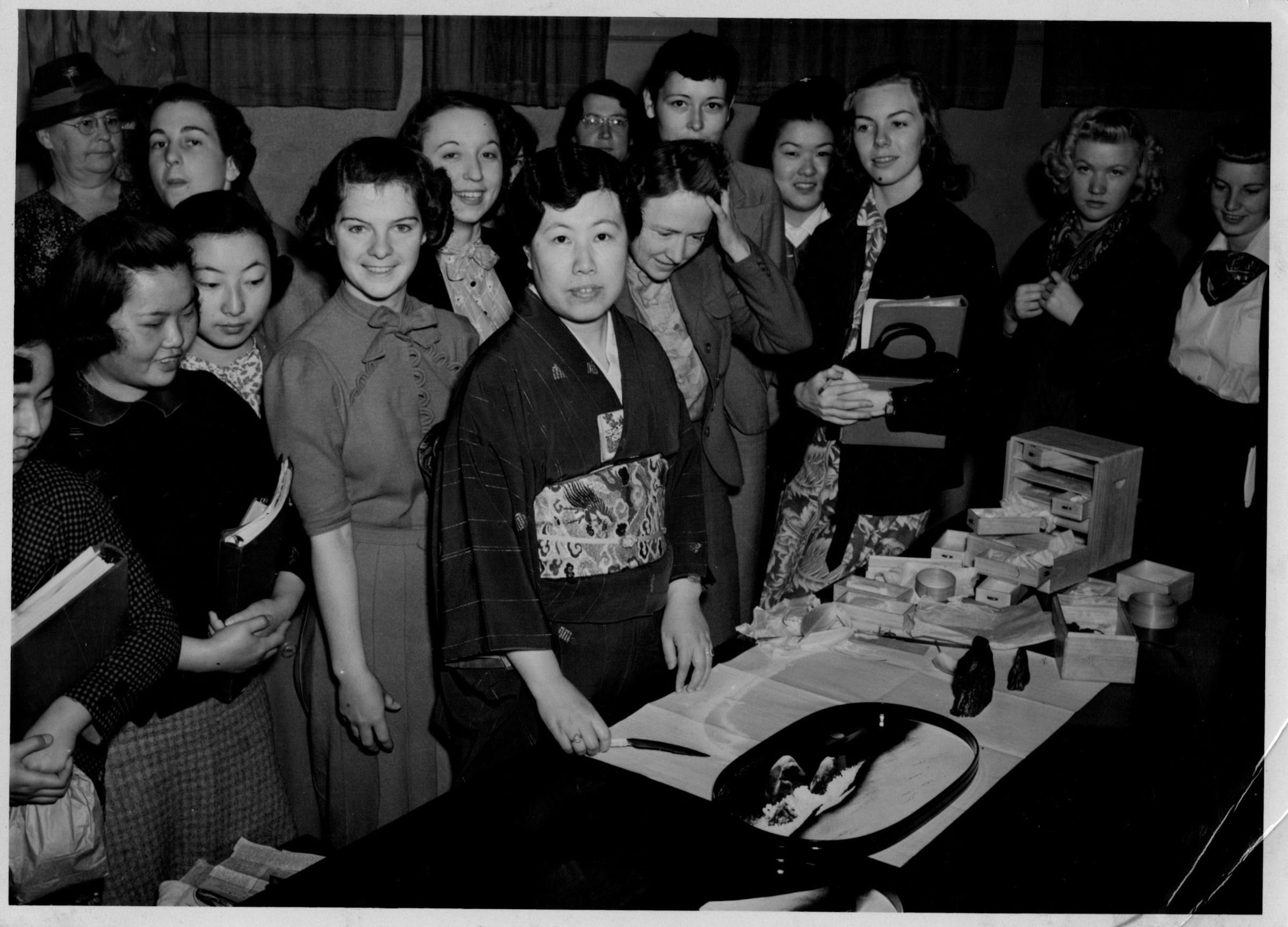
Asa demonstrating bonseki in 1939

Invited to speak on behalf of the Ministry of Foreign Affairs with the American Council of Education, Asa travelled to America again in 1938, meeting with Eleanor Roosevelt at the White House, and speaking to the Japan Society, the National Education Association, the Pan-Pacific Ocean New Education Association, and was featured on NBC Radio, and in The New York Times. In all, she gave 150 lectures on subjects as varied as the positions of Japan and China, slide screenings of Shosoin's Imperial Treasure, flower arranging, Bonseki, and Kimono during her 18 months of stay.

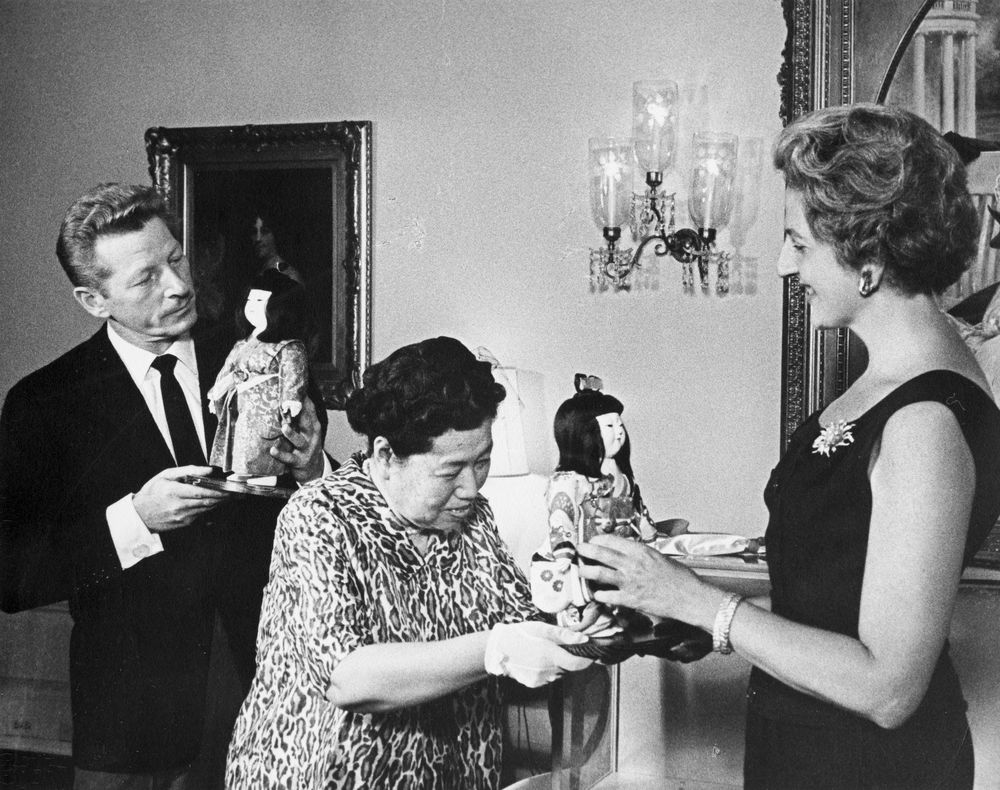
At the White House with Danny Kaye

Asa would spend WW2 in China, establishing the Nanjing Children's Academy and a soup kitchen for refugees escaping the frequently shifting alliances during the Chinese Civil War. Returning to Japan after the fall of the Wang Jingwei regime, Asa was introduced to UNICEF representative Margarita Streer who convinced her to volunteer and cooperate with the organization in support of Japanese children affected in the aftermath of WW2. In 1950, Asa would establish the Japan Committee for UNICEF, and become its first managing director. Until her retirement in 1966, Asa would work tirelessly as UNICEF's official representative to Japan, helping to provide meals and education to under-privileged Japanese children, joining the UNICEF Executive Committee every year at United Nations Headquarters, and met with Jackie Kennedy at the White House, presenting her with Japanese dolls for her daughter Caroline, the future United States ambassador to Japan who fondly remembered the gesture during her tenure as Ambassador.

== Later life ==
Retiring from UNICEF, Asa continued her role as a cultural ambassador, founding the International Culture Appreciation and Interchange Society, Inc. in 1968, focusing on overseas cultural exchange, underwriting a Spanish Art exhibition in Japan, and persuading as many as 40 Living National Treasures such as Togyū Okumura, Meiji Hashimoto, and Tamako Kataoka to hold exhibitions in Australia and New Zealand, and donated their work to number of local museums including the newly built International Pavilion at the National Gallery of Victoria in Melbourne.

Asa died as a result of colorectal cancer on 16 November 1980, at Hibiya Hospital in Chiyoda, Tokyo at 87 years of age.

== Bibliography ==
Year	Title	Publisher	Reference No.	Notes
1928	Social status of married women under present law in the United States and Japan	Columbia University	OCLC 56157451	
1930	Shoso-in, Ancient Storehouse of Treasures of Old Japan: A Brief Account of the Building and Its More Important Historic and Artistic Treasures	Japan Society	OCLC 40837460	
1930	Two Great Japanese Masterpieces in the Brooklyn Museum	Brooklyn Museum	ISSN 2578-7632	
1932	Labor Conditions of Women and Children in Japan	US Department of Labor	US Government Publication No. 558	
1932	Sacred Treasures of Nara in Shōsō-in & Kasuga Shrine	Hokuseidou Press	OCLC 4820061	
1932	Battle Dress of Feudal Japan	Asia Publishing Co	OCLC 11458602	
1938	米國博物館の組織とその使命	Japan Museum Cooperation		
1945	奈良の聖寶	輝ク		
1945	ルーズベルト大統領夫人訪問記	誠文堂新光社		

== Legacy ==
The International Culture Appreciation and Interchange Society, Inc continues Asa's mission in fostering goodwill between Japan and the Oceania region. They offered its inaugural "Asa Matsuoka Award" in 2013 to 3 Australian artists, Heidi Axelsen, Hugo Moline, and Nathan Hawkes.
