= Tsai Cao-ju =

Taiwanese artist (1919–2007)

Tsai Cao-ju (Chinese: 蔡草如; Wade–Giles: Tsai Tsao-ju; Pe̍h-ōe-jī: Chhoà Chháu-jû, 1919–2007), was a painter from Tainan City, Taiwan. Most of Tsai’s works are temple paintings(廟宇彩繪), eastern gouache (膠彩), and ink works(水墨畫), but the artist is also known for his watercolors and oil paintings.

== Life ==
Tsai Cao-ju was born in Eirakucho(永樂町), Tainan City (present-day Puji Street普濟街) during the period of Japanese rule. His father was a craftsman who was an expert in creating exquisite bronzeware, and who was exceptional in his crafting and design skills. Although his father was talented artistically, he was not good at handling finance, and as a result, the family suffered from financial hardships. Fortunately, Tsai’s mother, Chen Ming-Hua (1897-1960), was an expert at embroidery and pottery painting, which provided some relief to the family’s financial burdens. Tsai’s mother was the older sister of renowned temple painter Chen Yu-Feng(Chinese: 陳玉峰; Pe̍h-ōe-jī: Tân Gio̍k-hong, 1900-1964). Thus, Tsai’s interest and talent in fine art, which had been evident since his childhood, was perhaps a consequence of the artistic lineage on both his mother’s and his father’s side, but it is also likely to have stemmed from his upbringing. In particular, the impact of the artistic family on his mother’s side made a deep impression.

In 1927, Tsai entered the Tainan City Second Public Elementary School (the present-day Tainan Municipal Liren Elementary School臺南市北區立人國小), and while he was in grade six, Tsai attended the national poster competition, organized by the Government-General, at which he won first prize. At the time, veteran painter Liao Chi-chun(廖繼春; Pe̍h-ōe-jī: Liāu Kè-chhun) lived in Tainan. He was 17 years older than Tsai, and was a teacher at Chang Jung Middle School. Liao also owned a painting supply store in Takasago, which was on today’s Section 1 of Minquan Road. Displayed in the store were some of Liao’s works, including Still Life(靜物) and Nude Woman(裸女), both of which were selected for the first Taiwan Fine Art Exhibition (1902), as well as Courtyard with Plantain Trees(有芭蕉樹的庭園), which was selected for the Imperial Fine Art Academy Exhibition. These works left a deep impression on the mind of the young Tsai, and inspired his idea to study in Tokyo.

In 1937, with the aim of alleviating his family's financial difficulties, 19-year-old Tsai Cao-ju began to learn painting under the tutelage of his maternal uncle, Chen Yu-Feng. Through observation and self-study, Tsai immersed himself in traditional ink and folk painting. Remarkably, only six months later, he began painting door gods on his own, which was three years sooner than most folk painters. In the 1940s, when Chen Yu-Feng was inundated with commissions, Tsai’s financial situation improved significantly. By this time, Tsai was in a position to provide for his family financially.

However, with the outbreak of the Pacific War in the December of 1941, and as the Japanese colonial government began implementing their policy of Japanization, and specific policies, such as “Temple Rectification”(寺廟整理運動), had an impact on temple art, which is connected deeply with traditional religious beliefs. Consequently, almost all commissions for temple paintings came to a halt. Two years before the Second World War ended (1943), Tsai finally managed to travel to Japan, where he enrolled at the prestigious Kawabata Painting School. This was where he received robust training in how to sketch, and his time at the school impacted deeply his later eastern gouache and ink works.

In the March of 1945, the main building of the Kawabata Painting School was destroyed in the war. Tsai once changed his name to “Akagi Kenichi(赤城堅一)” for employment purposes during the Japanese era, adopting "Akagi (which means “the Red (iChinese: 赤; pinyin: chi; Pe̍h-ōe-jī: chhiah) city” in Chinese)" as a surname to commemorate his hometown, Chikanlou(Chinese: 赤崁樓; Pe̍h-ōe-jī: Chhiah-khàm-lâu). After returning to Taiwan, Tsai once again helped his uncle and folk painter, Chen Yu-feng, with temple paintings. At the same time, Tsai also became an eager participant in the newly-established Taiwan Provincial Fine Art Exhibition, at which he was awarded first prize on multiple occasions. In 1953, deeply aware of his grassroots, down-to-earth personality, once more Tsao changed his name from Jin-tian(Chinese: 錦添; Pe̍h-ōe-jī: Kím-thiam) to Cao-ju(Chinese: 草如; Pe̍h-ōe-jī: Chháu-jû).

After being awarded several first prizes over the years, in 1960 Tsao eventually became a juror for the “Chinese Painting Department”, and was invited to become a member of the largest private painting association, the “Tai-Yang Arts Society.”(Chinese: 臺陽美術協會; Pe̍h-ōe-jī: Tâi-iông Bí-su̍t Hia̍p-huē) To promote ink art, in 1964 Tsai became the founder of the Tainan City Chinese Painting Research Association, organizing annual public exhibitions at cultural and educational venues across Tainan City. Members would share their works and progress, which encouraged ink painting(水墨畫) to thrive in Southern Taiwan.

== The Style ==
Eastern Gouache Paintings (膠彩畫)

The techniques used by Tsai Cao-ju in his early Eastern gouache paintings resembled traditional ink painting, but after 1958, he began to incorporate bold colors, which resulted from layering thin coats of paint. Despite having highly contrasting color tones and being powerful in their expression, his compositions allude to a humble and rustic local essence. Tsai was known for his meticulous approach to painting, often carrying a sketchbook with him to capture the scenes he encountered. In his later years, his artistic style evolved to become more serene and profound, shifting towards subjective expression in both form and color.

Temple Door Gods Painting (廟宇門神彩繪)

Tsai’s temple Door Gods paintings showcase distinctive artistic characteristics. Classic examples of these are the paintings on the main doors of Tainan Kaiyuan Temple(開元寺), which was completed in 1972, and which include the Skanda(韋馱) and the Sangharama(伽藍) on the middle door, and the Four Heavenly Kings(四大天王) on the secondary door.

Tsai’s Door Gods paintings are depicted with soft lines, with an emphasis on the coordination of colors, exuding a style that is more reserved through its use of painterly, artistic qualities. The style of these Door Gods was perhaps influenced by his outstanding ink paintings of human figures. The proportions of the Door Gods are based on the principle of a head-to-body ratio of approximately 1:6.5 or 1:7, following the typical bodily proportions of eastern people. Tsai’s Door gods are often depicted with a halo, and when pieces of clothing fall under the light of the halo, the colors would become lighter, suggesting the lightness of the fabric.

Folk Paintings (民俗畫)

Although Tsai Cao-ju stopped creating temple paintings after 1988, he persevered in producing folk paintings on paper and silk. He devoted particular attention to precision in design and composition, striving to evoke a sense of grandeur, while depicting skillfully both light and shadow. Tsai’s meticulous research encompassed the postures, expressions, movements, attire, and settings of the characters, with an unwavering commitment to accuracy and precision in his artwork.
