= Chen Hsia-yu =

Taiwanese sculptor (1919–2000)

Chen Hsia-yu (Chinese: 陳夏雨; July 8, 1917 – January 3, 2000) was a Taiwanese sculptor. He was born in Longjing Village, Dajia County, Taichū Prefecture (now Longjing District, Taichung City). He studied sculpture under Kooyu Fujii, who encouraged him to participate in the Shin Bunten (New Cultural Exhibition), where he was selected for three consecutive years and obtained the "no inspection" (exempt from review) qualification.

Chen was a founding member of the Taiyang Art Association Sculpture Department, a Provincial Art Exhibition judge, and a teacher at Taichung Normal School. He later withdrew from the association and resigned from his teaching position and judgeship. He continued to create until he was over 80 years old. He died of heart failure in 2000 at the age of 82.

== Life ==
Chen Hsia-yu was born in Longjing Village, Taichung in 1917. He showed artistic talent since childhood. At the age of eight, he entered Dali Public School. While studying at Tamkang Middle School, he was exposed to the art of photography. Due to excessive practice, he became ill and had to drop out of school and go home to recuperate. However, he still asked his third uncle, who was studying in mainland Japan, to buy him a camera. At 17, he studied photography with his third uncle in Japan. For some reason, he could not enter a photography school but became an apprentice in a photo studio. Later, due to physical discomfort, he returned to Taiwan to recuperate. At this time, his uncle brought back a grandfather statue commissioned by sculptor Hori Shinji from Japan, which inspired Chen Hsia-yu's determination to study sculpture in Japan.

In 1935, Chen Hsia-yu went to Japan again. With the introduction of Chen Houei-kuen, he became a student of Tetsuya Mizutani (1876–1943), a professor of sculpture at Tokyo School of Fine Arts. Tetsuya Mizutani was only focused on basic sculpture education, so Chen Hsia-yu only learned basic skills such as sharpening carving knives or helping his teacher make portraits during his one-year study. He thought being unable to create independently was contrary to the purpose of coming to Japan, so he entered the studio of Kooyu Fujii (1882–1958), a member of the Imperial Academy of Arts, who mainly created human bodies.

Fujii believed that the most important thing about sculpture was to constantly observe, experience, and explore, which influenced Chen Hsia-yu's future creations. When Chen Hsia-yu was in Fujii's studio from 1938 to 1940, his works Naked Woman (1938), Hair (1939), and After Bath (1940) were selected for the Shin Bunten (New Cultural Exhibition, formerly Teiten, the Imperial Exhibition). As a result, he was exempted from review in 1941, becoming the only sculptor in Taiwan to receive this honor at the time. In the same year, his "Seated Statue" was selected for the Sculptors Association Exhibition, where he received the "Association Award" and was recommended to become a member. In 1941, he also became one of the founding members of the Sculpture Department of the Taiyang Art Association.

After returning to Taiwan from Japan in 1946, Chen Hsia-yu taught at Taichung Normal School and served as a judge for the Taiwan Provincial Art Exhibition. After the February 28 incident, from 1947 to 1949, he successively withdrew from the Taiyang Art Association Sculpture Department, resigned from his teaching position and his position as a judge, and devoted himself to creation. His creative subjects include human sculptures, portraits, and holy Buddha statues.

== Style ==
Chen Hsia-yu studied under Kooyu Fujii from 1936 to 1943 and inherited the spirit-based sculptural connotation emphasized by Kosuke Fujii's "Exhibition School". He idealized his thoughts and spirit through the forms created in his works. His creations focused on the well-balanced beauty of texture and bones, showing simplicity, simplicity, and aesthetic qualities. The depiction of facial expressions introduces spiritual connotations.

In the later period of creation, Chen Hsia-yu no longer deliberately emphasized the sharpening of the body and reduced the clarity of the body outline in creation, pursuing the tranquility and essence of life inwardly. The work emphasizes the movement and inner strength of the object.

== Awards ==
- 1938 – Shin Bunten: Naked Woman was selected for exhibition
- 1939 – Shin Bunten: Hair was selected for exhibition
- 1940 – Shin Bunten: After Bath was selected for exhibition
- 1941–1945 – Imperial Exhibition: "No Inspection" (Exempt from Review) Qualification
- 1941 – Seated Statue was selected for the Japan Sculptors Association Exhibition and won the Association Award

== Exhibitions ==
- 1945 – "Nude No. 1", the first Japan Exhibition and Brazil International Exhibition
- 1979 – Sculpture Exhibition, Taichung
- 1981 – "Three Bull Reliefs," "Reclining Woman," "Seated Woman," Pacific Art Exhibition, Japan
- 1997 – Chen Xiayu's Works Exhibition, Taipei Eslite Gallery
