= Teng Ming-Tun =

Taiwanese artist (born 1962)

- 鄧明墩
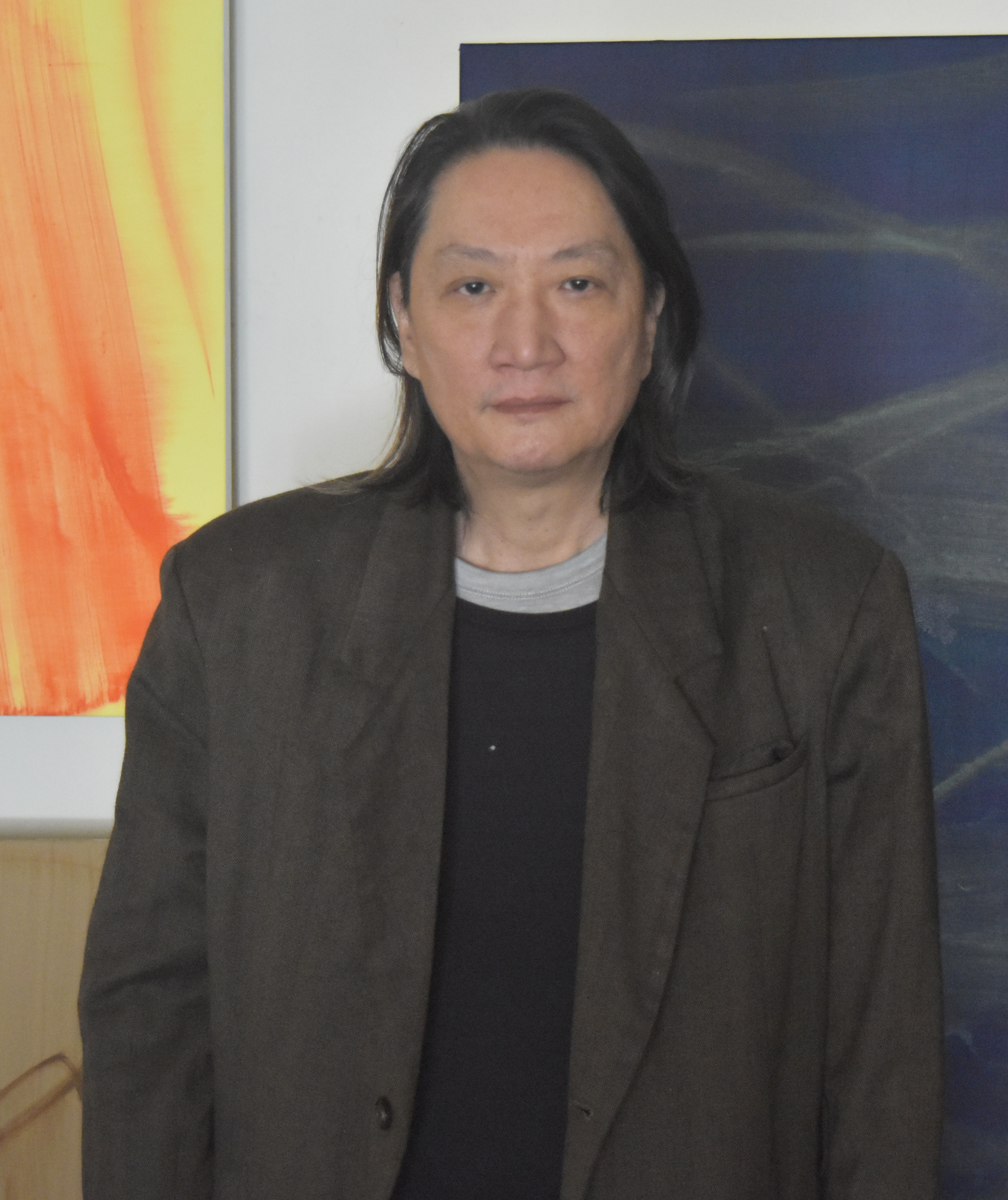
- Born: 1962; Taiwan
- Education: Mingdao Middle School

Teng Ming-Tun (Chinese: 鄧明墩) (born 1962) is a Taiwanese artist specialising in oil painting, watercolours and pastels. He is considered a pioneer in the artistic field of contemporary abstraction.

== Early life and education ==
Teng Ming-Tun (鄧明墩) was born in Taichung City, Taiwan Province, in 1962. He is a 16th-generation descendant of Teng Yanba (鄧彥拔), of which lineage traditionally bears the character Tun (敦) in its members' given names. (Note: During the Qianlong period of the Qing Dynasty, the three sons Tongxian, Chunxian and Jinxian from Ping County, Zhenping County, Jiaying Prefecture, Guangdong Province (now Jiaoling County, Meizhou City) took the lead in crossing Taiwan with their families.) Teng began learning painting at an early age and started teaching himself at approximately six years old. His grandfather, Teng Kung-hsien (鄧恭賢), also known as Hui Fu (慧福), served as director of Guanshan Temple in Taichung City. During renovations of the temple, artists were commissioned by the abbot to produce religious artworks, such as Buddha statues and other symbolic painting. Observing the restoration process provided Teng with exposure to artistic production and fuelled his interest in art. He often used his grandfather's tools to practice calligraphy as a young child, which led him to acquire foundational knowledge in writing and drawing.

Teng participated in several Watercolor Sketching from Life competitions in elementary school, from second grade onwards. In his fifth grade, he received first place in a Watercolor Sketching from Life competition held at Zhongshan Park in central Taichung. Teng subsequently attended Juren Junior High School, where he studied painting for three years under Li Yuande and practised sketching throughout the Taichung area. He further studied art in the art department of Mingdao Middle School, where he learnt bamboo carving and three-dimensional art production under the bamboo sculptor Chen Chunming.

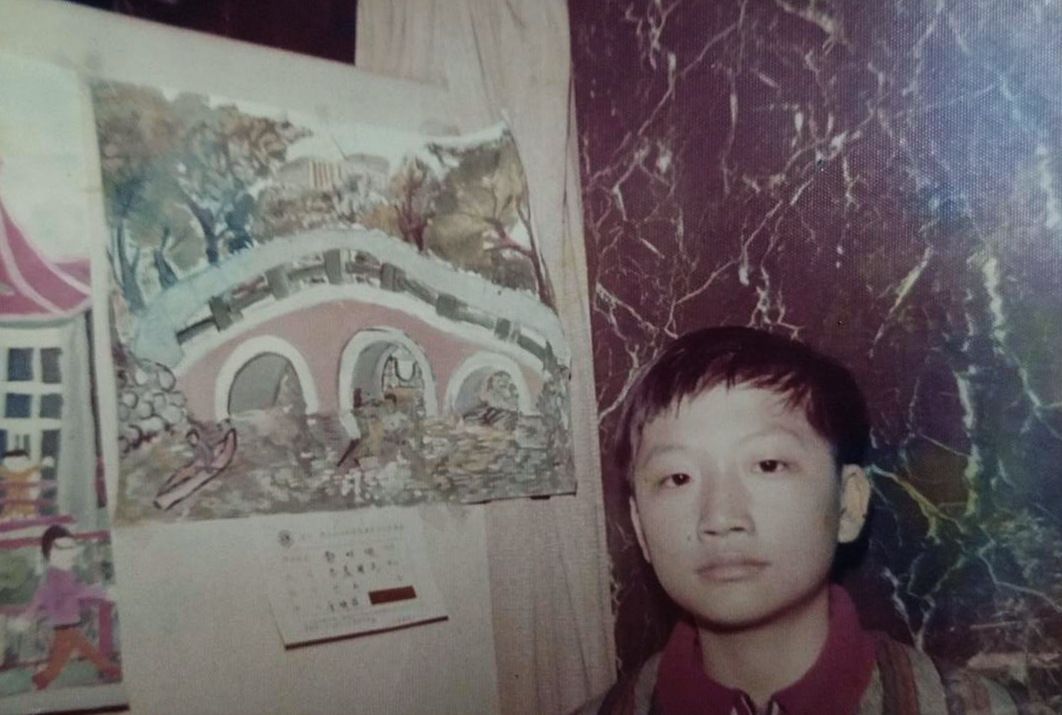
Teng in 1975

== Career ==
After completing his military service, Teng worked in advertising art design and real estate agency planning. In 1992, he began to focus on fine art research and practice, especially in oil painting. In 1997, he was invited to hold his first solo exhibition at the Fanshi Art Center in Taichung City. He later continued to create and publish artworks at his home studio in Dali, Taichung. In 2006, Teng established a studio in the southern district of Taichung City, where he continued creating paintings and started teaching students. During this period, he began documenting his creative process through video recordings, which were later published online for educational and research purposes. Teng relocated his studio back to Dali in 2017. In 2019, Teng began creating a series of abstract paintings, followed in 2021 by the promotion and exhibition of the first chapter of his ink and wash cursive paintings.

From 1992 to 2008, Teng mainly studied landscape painting, both in realistic or freehand technique. His artistic style during this period was influenced by French Impressionism, particularly in its representation on light and color in which Teng showed considerable skill, and by the work of Claude Monet. In addition to landscape projects, Teng also experimented with Impressionist brushwork and colors in combination with themes associated with Eastern culture. His paintings featured characters such as Guanyin, Vajrapani, Vajrayakṣa, Zhong Kui represented through a fusion of Chinese and Western stylistic elements. In later developments, he incorporated Fauvism into semi-abstract paintings, in a comparable style to Liao Chi-chun's. Following a visit to Jiufen in 1995, which became a source of artistic inspiration, he combined Impressionist and Fauvist techniques to complete the piece Jiufen Spring 50F.

From 2009 to 2018, Teng produced the Misty series. These pieces were created using only a monochromatic purple-blue palette. Layered, mist-like effects were used to create subdued, cold lighting and indistinct visual forms. The series has been interpreted as expressing and symbolising themes such as history, belief systems, memory, and the passage of time. The Misty series represents a distinct phase in Teng’s artistic development. Notable works from this period include portraits and thematic paintings referencing figures such as Dutch post-impressionist painter Vincent van Gogh, Chinese ink painter Zhang Daqian, Taiwanese painter Li Meishu, Renaissance painter Michelangelo, as well as singers Jinmen Wang and Li Binghui who appear in his artwork Wandering to Tamsui (2016), which also features Tamsui Guanyin Mountain. Martial arts stars Bruce Lee and Chuck Norris.

Teng shifted towards abstract painting in 2019, and produced a series of three works entitled: Ink and Wash Cursive, One is Everything, and Qi and Molecules. His abstract pieces, based on figurative and impressionistic techniques and inspired by forms in Chinese cursive calligraphy, combined wet ink and dry oil brushwork. The publication of these artworks has opened up new forms of artistic expression in Taiwanese abstract art. Notable works by Teng include Taixu, an ink and cursive oil painting created in 2021, which predicted that the Event Horizon Telescope (EHT) international cooperation project would release the image of Sagittarius A on the evening of May 12, 2022, Taiwan Time.

In 2022, Teng began the Soul of Mountains and Spirits of Trees series, returning to more representational techniques to depict mountain and forest scenery in Taiwan. Simultaneously creating the "One Is Everything" abstract series, Part of his work is displayed in the Yongdu Art Museum.

== Awards ==
- 1974 World Children's Painting Award
- 1975 First Prize in Watercolor Sketching in Central Taiwan
- 1976 National Student Painting Competition EMI Aesthetic Education Award (Silver Award)
- 1977 Gold Medal in the Central Taiwan Sketching Competition
- 1978 Excellent Student Art Exhibition in the Province 1978 Second Place in Central China Sketching Competition
- 1978 First place in the Central Taiwan Cartoon Competition of the China Youth Corps
- 1981 Third place in the Central Taiwan Sketching Competition
- 1982 Central Taiwan Art Exhibition 1984 First place in the Army Academy Political Weekly Writing and Drawing Competition
- 1996 Teng participated in the IMA International Modern Art Exhibition in Japan and won the Tokyo Metropolitan Board of Education Award (Gold Medal).

== Exhibitions ==
- 1996 IMA International Modern Art Exhibition, Ueno Museum of Art, Tokyo, Japan
- 1997 Fanshi Art Center_Teng MingTun 92-97 Oil Painting Exhibition
- 2000 New Century Teng Ming-Tun Oil Painting Solo Exhibition, Tainan Yongdu Art Museum
- 2000 Dadun Art Gallery, Taichung City Cultural Affairs Bureau — Western Painting, Eastern Spirit: "Teng Ming-Tun's New Century Oil Painting Exhibition"
- 2004 Yuanlin Performance Hall, Changhua County – Teng Ming-Tun Solo Oil Painting Exhibition (A Celebration of Light and Color)
- 2007 Taipei County Tamsui Art Center, Romantic Art Travel Oil Painting Solo Exhibition
- 2009 Hands in Hand Art Space Memory Fades_Teng MingTun Works Exhibition
- 2018 Taipei National Sun Yat-sen Memorial Hall, Teng Ming-Tun's Original Style Oil Painting Exhibition
- 2021 Kaohsiung City Cultural Center (ink and cursive), Teng Ming-Tun's oil painting solo exhibition
- 2021 Kaohsiung Weiwuying National Art and Culture Center_The 4th International Artists Festival Invitational Exhibition
- 2022 Kaiser Art Gallery (ink and cursive), Teng Ming-Tun's oil painting solo exhibition
- 2022 Changhua County Art Museum (ink and cursive), Teng Ming-Tun's oil painting solo exhibition
- 2024 Tun District Art Center, Teng Ming-Tun Oil Painting Exhibition (ink and cursive)

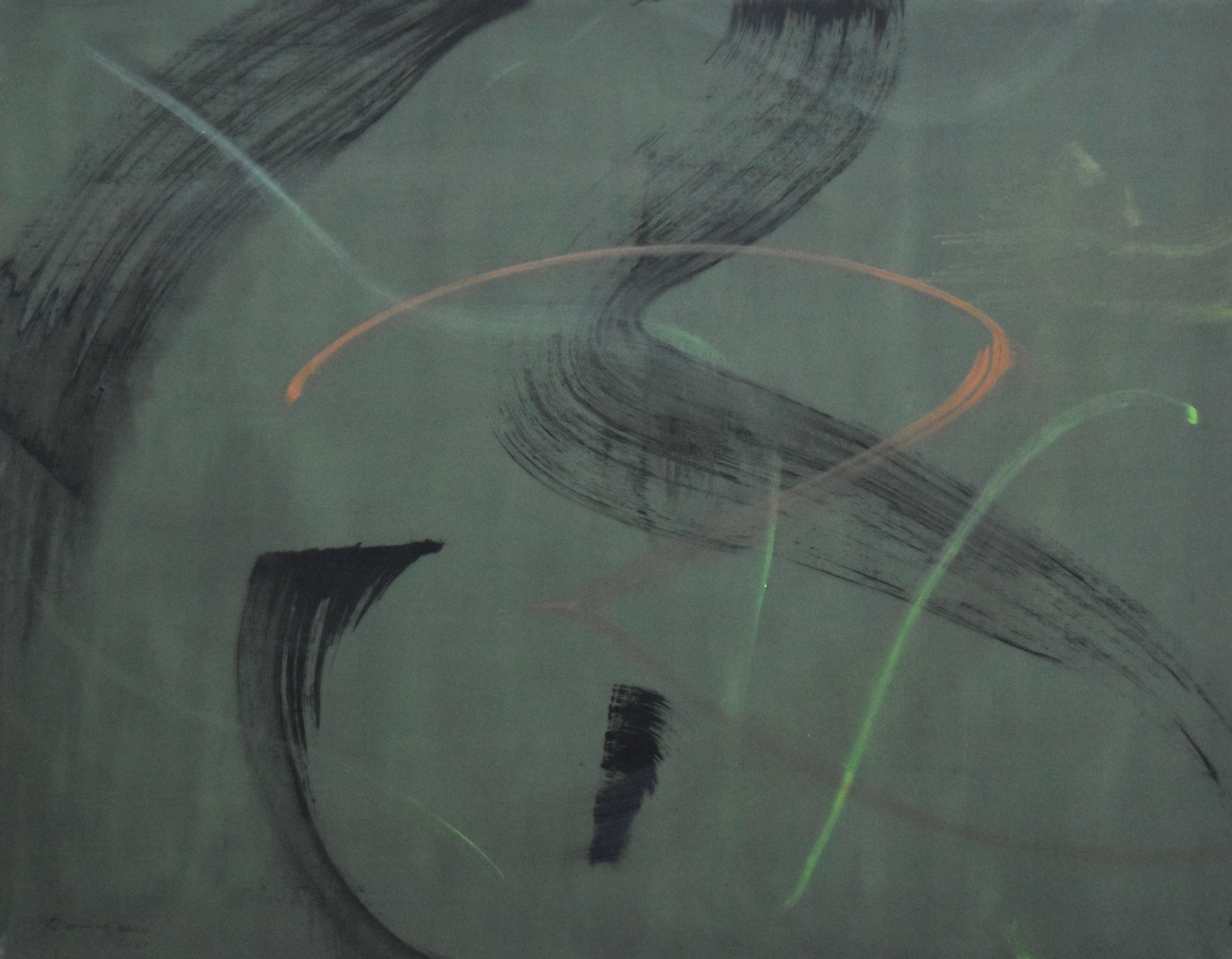
Ink Wash Cursive (2020)

- 2026 Taichung International Art Fair (Art Taichung 2026)

== Publications ==
In 2011, Teng published Mist & Lost, a collection of his oil paintings from 2008 to 2010.

== Charitable activities ==
Teng participated in the Tzu Chi Great Love Hope Project donation campaign organised in response to the 921 Earthquake, and donated paintings to support victims in Taichung. He also contributed to efforts led by Xinhua Charitable Foundation for poverty relief, and the Zhou Daguan Foundation to raise funds for children with cancer.

== Art History Book Collection ==
- Taiwan Art Yearbook
- Complete History of the Development of Local Art in Taiwan
- Yearbook of Famous Chinese Artists in the World
- Contemporary Volume of China International Who's Who
- Japanese Contemporary International Art Yearbook
- Dictionary of Contemporary Taiwanese Artists

== family ==
- grandfather：Teng Kung-hsien (鄧恭賢)
- grandmother：Huang Tian-mei (黃添妹)
- Father ： Teng Ren-rong (鄧仁榮)
- Mother ：Teng Zhang Xiu-ying (鄧張秀英)
- younger brother ：Teng Fu-Tun (鄧富墩)

- Teng Ming-Tun's parents recognized his artistic talent from a young age and therefore provided him with a rich learning environment and resources, which greatly helped his future development.
