= Chang Lee Te-ho =

Taiwanese female poet and artist (1893-1972)

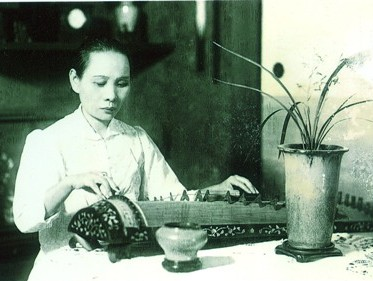
Chang playing the guzheng

Chang Lee Te-ho (Chinese: 張李德和; Pe̍h-ōe-jī: Tiunn Lí Tik-hô; May 6, 1893 – December 11, 1972) (Note: Courtesy name Lianyu (連玉); also known as Lady Luoshan (羅山女史), owner of Linlang Mountain Pavilion (琳瑯山閣主人), owner of Tijing Pavilion (題襟亭主人), owner of Yiyuan Garden (逸園主人), etc.) was a poet and artist active in Chiayi City, Taiwan. She was born in Xiluo, Yunlin. She was a member of the Xiluo Tan Society (西螺菼社) and Chiayi Luoshanyin Society (嘉義羅山吟社). She also founded the Linlang Mountain Pavilion Poetry Society (琳瑯山閣詩會), the Yaque Calligraphy and Painting Society (鴉雀書畫會), the Tijing Pavilion Lyric Writing Society (題襟亭填詞會), the Lianyu Poetry Society (連玉詩鐘社), and the Xiaoti Yin Society (小題吟會), among other literary gatherings. She also achieved success in the painting field, and her works were exhibited several times. In 1942, she was honored with the titles of "Recommended Painter" and "review waiver".

== Life ==
Chang Lee Te-ho was born on May 6, 1893 (some sources record May 18) in Xiluo Bao, Yunlin County, Taiwan, in the Qing dynasty's Fujian–Taiwan Province. In her youth, she received instruction in Chinese studies from her father and later studied for five years under her maternal aunt, Mrs. Liu, at Huoyuan private school (活源書房). In 1903, she enrolled in Xiluo Public School (now Chong Shan Elementary School, 中山國小), and in 1907, she attended Taiwan Governor-General's Mandarin School's Second Affiliated School (Xuehai Academy, 學海書院). After graduating in 1910, she taught at Douliu Public School (now Jhensi Elementary School, 鎮西國小), Xiluo Public School, and Chiayi Public School (now Chong-Wen Elementary School,崇文國小).

After marrying into a prominent family in Chiayi in 1912, Chang Lee Te-ho resigned from her teaching position the following year to assist her husband, Chang Chin-tsan, with managing the Zhufeng Hospital (諸峰醫院) in today's Houbi District, Tainan City. The hospital moved to Chiayi City in 1916 and was rebuilt into a Western-style building in 1929. The couple's living quarters and study on the second floor of the hospital were named the "Linlang Mountain Pavilion," and the garden behind the house was called the "Yiyuan（逸園）," where poetry gatherings were often held. Chang was renowned for her talent in poetry, lyrics, calligraphy, painting, music, chess, and embroidery, earning her the title of "Seven masteries." In 1941, during the Japanese colonial period, she was elected as the head of the Chiayi District Joint Guard Women's Group. During the late period of Japanese colonial rule, Chang Lee Te-ho changed her name to “Hase Tokuwa (長谷德和).”

After the end of World War II and Japan's surrender, Chang held various positions, including chairman of the Chiayi Relief Institute, member of the first temporary provincial council of Taiwan, chairman of the Minghua School of Home Economics (明華家事補習學校), member of the Taichung Calligraphy and Painting Exhibition Committee (臺中書畫展委員會), member of the Ministry of the Interior's Ritual and Custom Research Committee (內政部禮俗研究委員會), director of the Association for the Protection of Adopted Daughters (保護養女會), and president of the Orchid Exhibition (蘭花盆栽展覽會). She was widely respected for her contributions to various fields of society. In 1971, Chang went to her eldest son’s home Aomori Prefecture in Japan to recuperate from her illness. She died on December 11 in Shimokita District, Aomori Prefecture, at the age of 79.

== Notable works ==
=== Writings ===
- "Collected Poems of the Tijin Pavilion"
- "Collected Ci of the Tijin Pavilion "
- "Poetry Collection of the Linlang Mountain Pavilion"
- "Painting and Calligraphy Collection of the Linlang Mountain Pavilion "
- "Collected Works of Chang Lee Te-he's Poetry and Prose"

=== Artworks ===
- "View in the Courtyard" (selected for the 1933 Taiwan Fine Art Exhibition)
- "Papaya" (selected for the 1936 Taiwan Fine Art Exhibition)
- "Leisurely Courtyard" (selected for the 1938 Provincial Exhibition)
- " Moth Orchids " (selected for the 1939 Provincial Exhibition)
- "Chinese Hibiscus" (selected for the 1940 Provincial Exhibition, awarded the "Governor General's Award")
- "Orchid Records of the South" (selected for the 1941 Provincial Exhibition)

== See also ==
Other outstanding Taiwanese Women during the Japanese Colonial Period:

- Wang Hsiang-chan (王香禪)
- Tsai Bi-yin (蔡碧吟)
- Tsai Ah-hsin
- Huang Chin-chuan (黃金川)
- Kuo Niang (郭娘)
- Sun Sun
- Lin Hau
- Yang Chian-ho (楊千鶴)
