= National Tainan First Senior High School =

Coordinates: 22°59′39″N 120°12′59″E

- 國立臺南第一高級中學
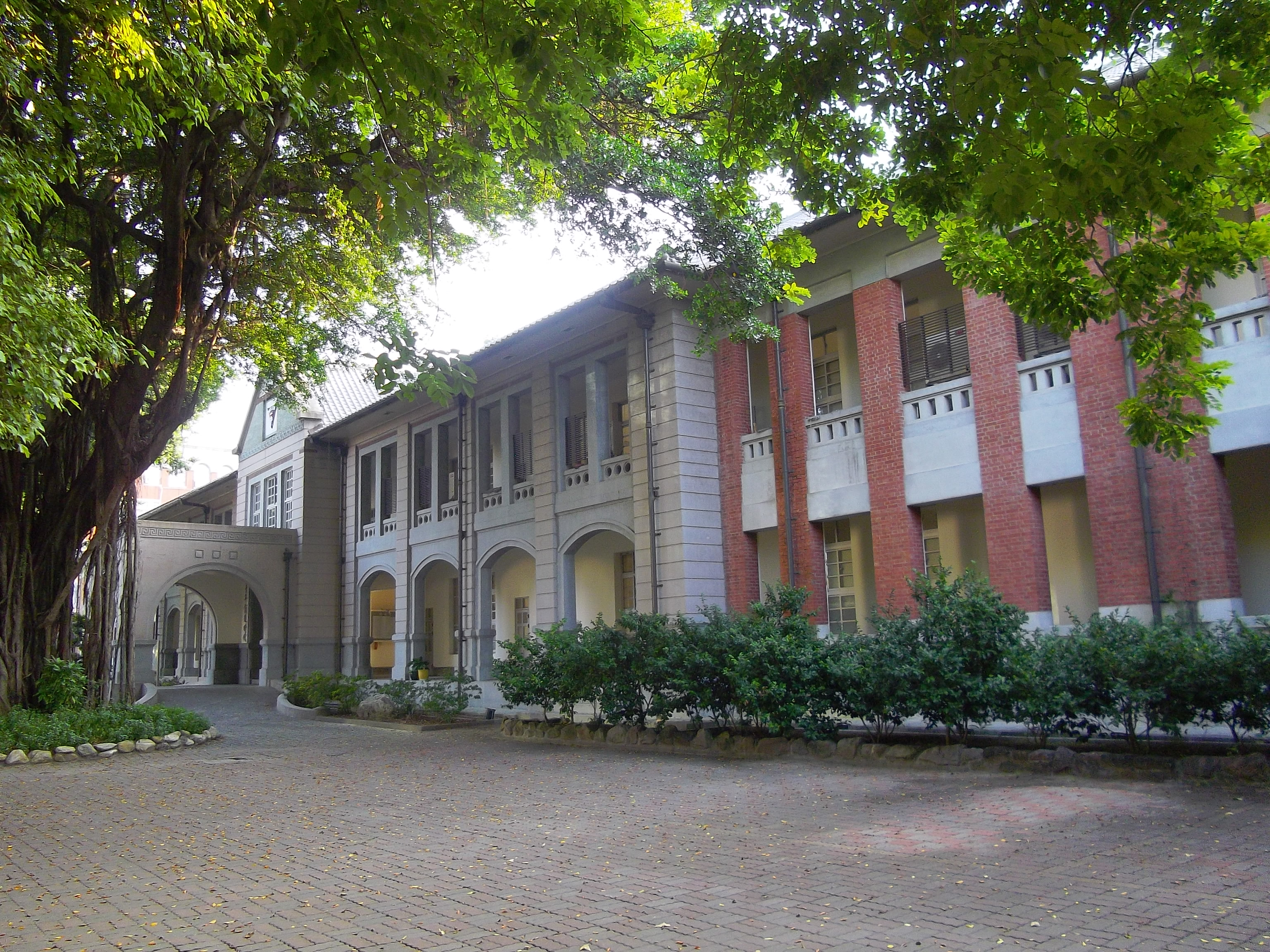
- No. 1, Sec. 1, Mintzu Rd., Tainan City, Taiwan 70145, R.O.C.

Information
- Type: National Senior High School
- Established: 1922
- School district: East
- Dean: 蔡明輝 張敬川 施明吉 黃立欣 胡秀蘭
- Principal: 廖財固
- Grades: 10-12
- Enrollment: 2500 (approximately)
- Website: www.tnfsh.tn.edu.tw

National Tainan First Senior High School (Chinese: 國立臺南第一高級中學; pinyin: Guólì Táinán Dìyī Gāojí Zhōngxué) is a public senior high school in East District, Tainan, Taiwan. It was established in 1922 and is considered one of the most prestigious high schools in Taiwan, usually only accepting students who rank in the top 3 percent of the Taiwan Basic Scholastic Test.

== History ==
The school, originally called 臺南州立臺南第二中學校 ("Tainan Second High School"), was established in 1922 by the Governor-General of Taiwan to achieve a Japanese and Taiwanese 'learning together' policy. The Tainan Second High School provided high school education for ethnic Taiwanese, while Tainan First High School was for ethnic Japanese from mainland Japan.

Originally set up as a five-year high school, it was changed to a four-year school in 1943 due to the start of World War II.

After the war, Taiwan was handed to the Republic of China, whose high school system was a 3-3-year one. In 1959, ShinHua Campus was established for senior high school students in ShinHua Township, Tainan County. The campus became independent in 1966 and was renamed to National ShinHua Senior High School. In 1970, Tainan Second High School was renamed to Provincial Tainan First High School. After Tainan was no longer included in Taiwan Province, the school became nationally funded.

== Notable alumni ==
=== Academics ===
- Wong Chi-huey, president of Academia Sinica and Wolf Prize in Chemistry laureate
- Hwung-hweng Hwung, former president of National Cheng Kung University
- Michael M. C. Lai, former president of National Cheng Kung University
- Shang-fa Yang, plant scientist and Wolf Prize in Agriculture laureate
- Si-chen Lee, president of National Taiwan University
- Chen-Yuan Lee, member of Academia Sinica

=== Arts and literature ===
- Chen-tsai Shen, famous Taiwanese painter
- Kui Yang, famous writer of Taiwanese literature
- Shih-tao Yeh, famous writer of Taiwanese literature

=== Film and music ===
- Ang Lee, Academy Award-winning film director
- Jutoupi, pop artist

=== Politics ===
- Shui-bian Chen, former president of the Republic of China (Taiwan) and former mayor of Taipei City
- Chih-fang Huang, former Minister of Foreign Affairs
- Chii-ming Yiin, former Minister of the Council for Economic Planning and Development (CEPD) of the Executive Yuan
- Chiu-hsing Yang, former mayor of Kaohsiung County
- I-jen Chiou, former vice president of the Executive Yuan
- Jia-dong Shea, former Minister of Finance
- Jing-pyng Wang, president of the Legislative Yuan
- Shih-meng Chen, former Vice-President of the Central Bank of the Republic of China and former Secretary General of the Office of the President of the Republic of China
- Ta-chou Huang, former mayor of Taipei City
- Tan Hochen, Minister of Transportation and Communications
- Tsan-hung Chang, former mayor of Tainan City

=== Sports ===
- Hung-chieh Chiang, table tennis player

== See also ==
- Education in Taiwan
