= Kooyu Fujii =

Japanese sculptor (1882–1958)

- 藤井浩佑
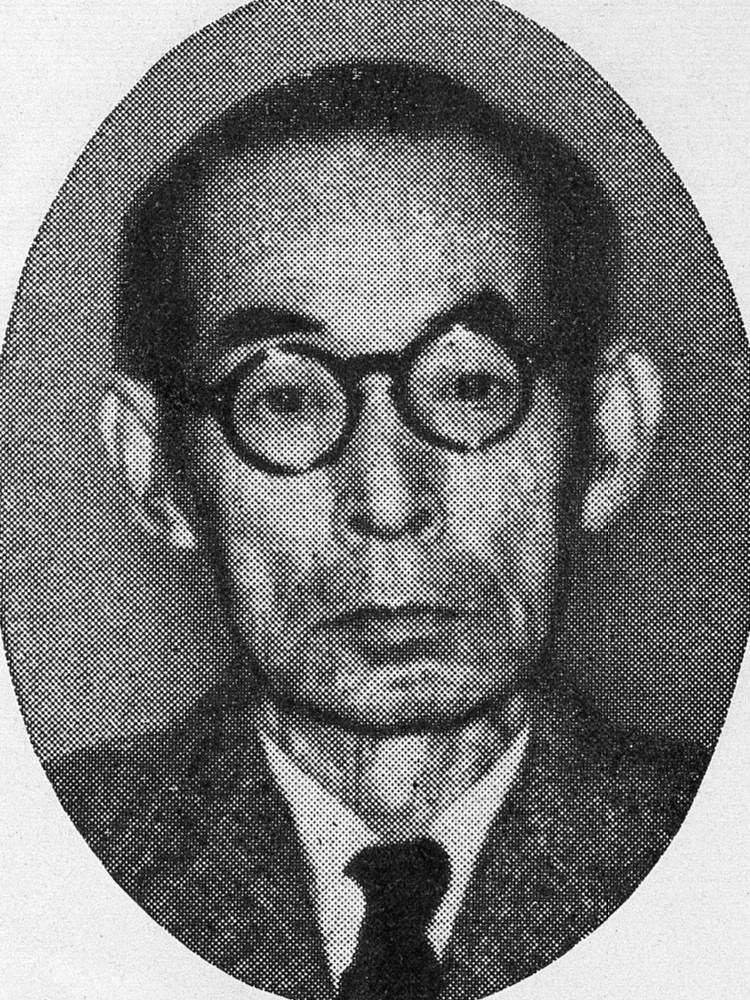
- Born: 29 November 1882; Tokyo, Japan
- Died: 15 July 1958 (aged 75); Atami, Japan
- Occupation: Sculptor

Kooyu Fujii (藤井 浩佑, Fujii Kooyu; 29 November 1882 – 15 July 1958) was a Japanese sculptor. His work was part of the sculpture event in the art competition at the 1932 Summer Olympics.
