= Tsai Ah-hsin =

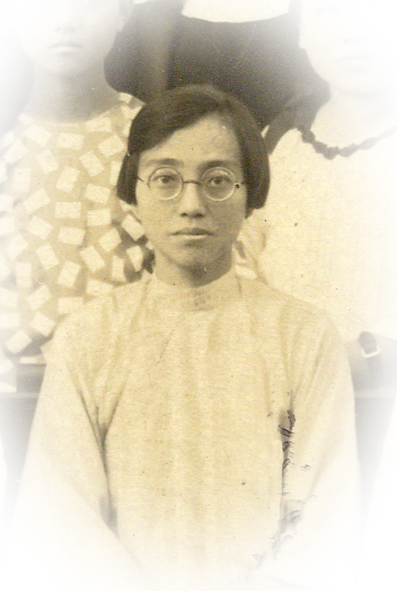
Tsai in 1934

Tsai Ah-hsin (Chinese: 蔡阿信; Pe̍h-ōe-jī: Chhoà A-sìn; 1899–1990) was colonial Taiwan's first female physician. She graduated from the Tokyo Women's Medical College in 1921 and then completed her residency at the Taihoku Hospital in Japanese Taiwan. In 1924, Tsai married Taiwan independence activist Peng Hua-ying. She founded her own hospital at Taichu in 1925. She created a seminar to train midwives in obstetrics, which was made part of her hospital. However, she had to end the seminar in 1938 as the Japanese, who had invaded northern China in 1937, came to her seminar and forced some of the students to work for them as nurses on the front lines.

The serial drama "Wave Washing Sands," about her life, won Best Serial Drama at the Golden Bell Awards in 2005.
