= Yang Maolin =

Taiwanese painter and sculptor (b. 1953)

- 楊茂林
- Born: 10 June 1953 (age 73); Changhua, Taiwan
- Education: Chinese Culture University; National Institute of the Arts
- Website: yang-maolin.com

Yang Maolin (Chinese: 楊茂林; pinyin: Yáng Màolín; born 1953) is a Taiwanese artist known for his political paintings and his art that investigates Taiwanese identity.

== Biography ==
Yang was born in 1953 in Changhua, Taiwan. His father had served in the Japanese Army, and was imprisoned by the Kuomintang after World War II, while his relatives were involved in the February 28 incident. Yang's father ran small manufacturing businesses with scant success, while his mother worked menial jobs.

Yang studied painting at the Chinese Culture University from 1975 to 1979, and attended graduate school at the National Institute of the Arts in Taipei from 1999 to 2002. From 1995, Yang was represented by Lin & Keng Gallery.

== Career ==
Yang was influenced by Italian Transavantgarde and Neo-expressionism when these movements were introduced to Taiwan in the early 1980s. Yang co-founded successive artist groups dedicated to political and figurative art, including '101 Modern Art Group' and 'Taipei Art Group' in the 1980s, and 'Hantoo Art Group' in the 1990s.

Yang is chiefly known for his politically charged paintings of the 1980s, and his decade-long investigation into the political, historical, and cultural aspects of Taiwanese identity during the 1990s, which comprises his painting series MADE IN TAIWAN (1989–2001). After the turn of the millennium, he started to explore sculpture, blending Buddhist iconography with manga characters. Beyond numerous museum shows in Asia, Europe, and the US, Yang has participated in three collateral events at the Venice Biennale: the exhibition VOC: Handle with Care with Huang Yong Ping in 1999; the solo show Temple of Sublime Beauty, Made in Taiwan in 2009; and the exhibition Future Pass in 2011.
