= Shen Che-tsai =

Taiwanese painter

- 沈哲哉
- Born: 1926; Tainan Prefecture, Taiwan, Empire of Japan
- Died: 27 September 2017 (aged 90–91)
- Education: Tainan Second High School of Tainan Prefecture
- Occupation: Painter
- Employer: Tainan Women's College of Arts and Technology

Shen Che-tsai (Chinese: 沈哲哉; pinyin: Shěn Zhézāi; 1926-27 September 2017) was a Taiwanese painter. He studied under Liao Chi-chun and Kuo Po-chuan. He was the councilor of Tainan Art Research Association and a professor at Tainan Woman's College of Arts and Technology. Shen was a prolific Taiwanese artist known for his paintings in the permanent collection of the National Taiwan Museum of Fine Arts--Person Sitting (1949), Cat Lady (1985), and Outskirts of San Francisco (1986). Additionally, his works can also be viewed at the Tainan Art Museum.

== Biography ==
Shen was born in Tainan in 1926. He entered the Tainan Second High School of Tainan Prefecture in 1938. Displaying artistic talent at a young age, Shen's painting, The Liu’s Household (oil on canvas) was displayed at the Tai-yang Art Exhibition in 1941 and Ming-lun Hall (watercolor) was displayed at the Taiwan Government Fine Arts Exhibition in 1943.

Shen earned national recognition as an artist through numerous exhibitions and competitions and is considered a proven member of the Taiwan art scene. Shen died on 27 September 2017, and his family donated some of his works to the Tainan Art Museum for its permanent collection.

== Creative Works ==
Shen's artwork represents a fusion of native Taiwan abstract expressionism of the 1970s and influences of American realism typified by Andrew Wyeth during the 1980s. In particular, he is known for his drawings and paintings of people, young ladies, ballet dancers, buildings, plants, and flowers and injecting a particular romance into his art. Largely eschewing political themes, Shen preferred paintings that evoked fondness and freedom.

== Exhibitions ==
- Palace (Fu) Fine Arts Exhibition
- Taiyang Fine Arts Exhibition. 1941
- Taiwan Governmental Fine Arts Exhibition. 1943
- National Taiwan Museum of Fine Arts. 1995
- The World of Shen Che-Tsai's Paintings. 2017
