= Hōshun Yamaguchi =

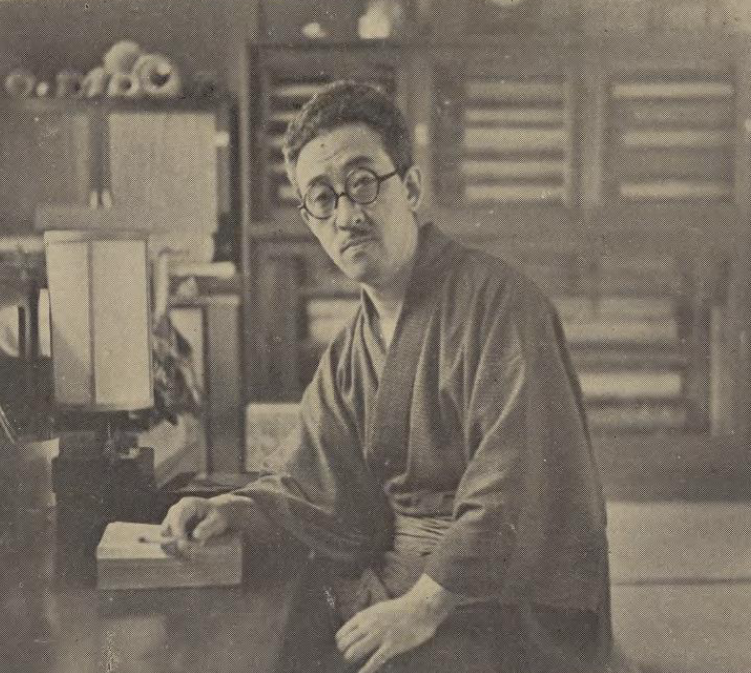
Japanese artist, Yamaguchi Hoshun

Hōshun Yamaguchi (山口蓬春, Yamaguchi Hōshun) (1893–1971) was a Japanese Nihonga painter and designer.

He received a commission to paint a piece for the new Tokyo Imperial Palace. The piece titled “Kaede (maples)” is a large painting measuring 2.74x2.5 metres. It is located on the cedar door of the east corridor of the Seiden hall. Opposite of it on the other side is “Sakura (cherry)” by Meiji Hashimoto.

The preparatory drawing for the panel at a 4:1 scale dating to 1967 is in the Yamatane Museum of Art in Tokyo.

The Yamaguchi Hoshun Memorial Museum exhibits many of his works.

== See also ==
- Seison Maeda (1885–1977), one of the leading Nihonga painters
- List of Nihonga painters
