= Selena Lin =

Taiwanese comic artist

- Born: Lín Qīnghuì (林青慧)

Selena Lin (Chinese: 林青慧; pinyin: Lín Qīnghuì; Wade–Giles: Lin Ching-hui) is a popular manhua artist in Taiwan. She is known for her shōjo style manhua. Her work includes romantic comic books, coloring books, magazines and calendars.

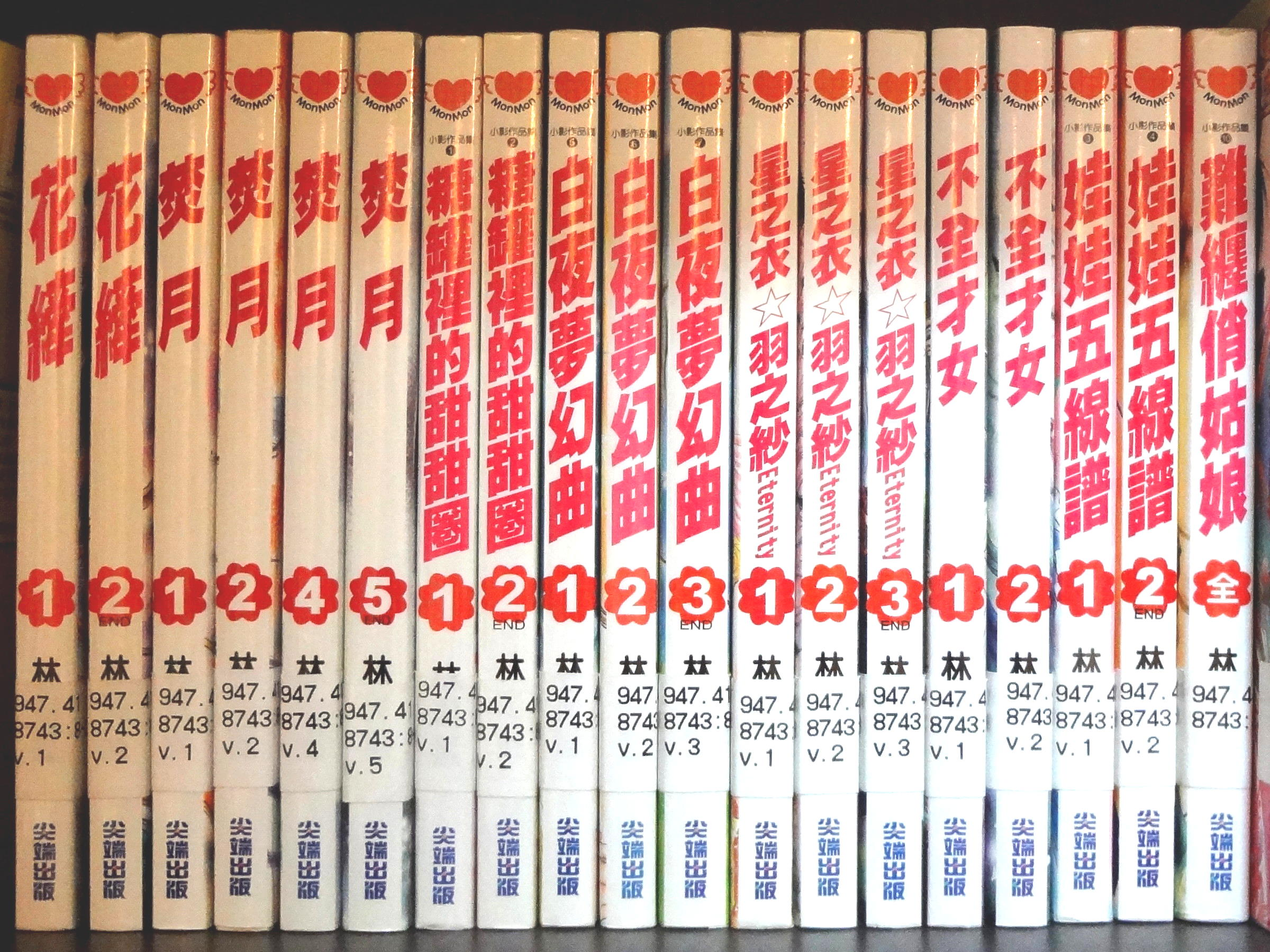
Selena Lin's comics published by Sharp Point Press.
