= Kuo Po-chuan =

Taiwanese artist and art educator (1901–1974)

Kuo Po-chuan (Chinese: 郭柏川; pinyin: Guō Bóchuān; Wade–Giles: Kuo^{1} Po^{2}-ch‘uan^{1}; July 21, 1901 – January 23, 1974), courtesy name Shaosong (少松), was a Taiwanese artist and art educator born in Tainan, Taiwan.

== Life ==
In 1910, Kuo Po-chuan enrolled in Tainan Second Public School (now Liren Elementary School, 立人國小) and in 1916, he passed the entrance exam for the Taipei National Language School's Public School Teacher Training Department B (臺北國語學校公學師範部乙科). After graduating in 1921, he returned to his hometown and began teaching. In 1928, with his expertise in art, he was admitted to the Western Painting Department of the Tokyo School of Fine Arts (now Tokyo University of the Arts), studying under the guidance of Okada Saburosuke. After graduating in 1933, he stayed in Japan for further studies. In 1937, he traveled to Northeast China from Japan and engaged in sketching in Manchukuo.

In 1938, he taught at the Beijing Normal University and the North China Art College (北平藝專). Between 1939 and 1943, he served as the translator and guide for Ryuzaburo Umehara during Umehara's sketching trips in Beijing. In 1940, Kuo Po-chuan married Zhu Wanhua (朱婉華), a Beijing native, and their wedding ceremony was celebrated with a march composed by the Taiwanese musician Chiang Wen-yeh in Beijing. In 1948, due to the Chinese Civil War, he moved back to Taiwan with his family, settling in Tainan. He taught at the Department of Architecture at the Tainan Institute of Technology (now National Cheng Kung University) and founded the Tainan Art Association. Kuo Po-chuan died in 1974.

== Artistic style ==
Kuo Po-chuan's paintings mainly focused on landscapes, portraits, and still life. Starting in 1943, he began creating oil paintings on rice paper. His painting style is concise with meticulous compositions, often incorporating traditional colors found in common folk objects and buildings, such as vermilion and blue-and-white. The lines are lively, and the fusion of Eastern and Western elements is considered one of his distinctive features.

== Legacy ==
Kuo Po-chuan's former residence is located at 27, Lane 321, Park Road, Tainan City. His daughter, Kuo Wei-mei (郭為美), funded the renovation of the residence and established the "Kuo Po-chuan Memorial Museum". The area was originally the official residences of the Japanese Infantry Second Regiment (now designated as a city historic site "Former Japanese Infantry Second Regiment Official Residence Group") and is currently known as the "321 Art Cluster (三二一藝術群聚)."
