= Meiji Hashimoto =

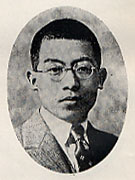
Japanese painter, Meiji Hashimoto (1904-1991)

Meiji Hashimoto (橋本明治, Hashimoto Meiji) (1904-1991) was a Japanese Nihonga painter and designer.

He received a commission to paint a piece for the new Tokyo Imperial Palace. The piece titled “Sakura (cherry)” is a large painting measuring 2.74x2.5 metres. It is located on the cedar door of the east corridor of the Seiden hall. Opposite of it on the other side is “Kaede (maples)” by Hōshun Yamaguchi.

== See also ==
- Seison Maeda (1885–1977), one of the leading Nihonga painters
- List of Nihonga painters
