= Chang Yi-hsiung =

Taiwanese painter (1914–2016)

Chang Yi-hsiung (May 28, 1914 - May 27, 2016), born in Chiayi, Taiwan, was a renowned Taiwanese painter and art educator who resided in Japan and France for many years. In 1987, he became the first Taiwanese artist to be awarded the Artist Pension from the French government. In 2005, he was conferred the Fourth Order of the Brilliant Star by former President Chen Shui-bian. In 2016, President Tsai Ing-wen posthumously bestowed upon him the Order of Brilliant Light with Commendation.

== Life ==
Chang Yi-hsiung, born into a prominent family in Chiayi, was the second of seven siblings. His father, Chang Ting-ji, was initially a teacher but later turned to business. His aunt, Chang Lee Te-he, was a well-known poet, painter, and philanthropist in Chiayi. From a young age, Chang Yi-hsiung showed an interest and talent in painting, and his father supported his artistic pursuits. In 1924, he had a chance encounter with the painter Chen Cheng-po, who was sketching near the central fountain in Chiayi. Chen Cheng-po, who was then studying at the Tokyo School of Fine Arts (now Tokyo University of the Arts) became a role model for Chang Yi-hsiung and inspired him to pursue a career as a painter. In 1926, through the introduction of his second uncle Chang Ding-ju, Chen Cheng-po was invited to teach Chang Yi-hsiung painting during his visit back to their hometown. In 1929, Chang entered the Kyoto Prefectural Shimei High School in Japan, and in 1931, he returned to Taiwan and attended Chiayi High School. However, he was suspended from school for skipping classes to watch movies.

After his father died in 1932, Chang Yi-hsiung went to Japan and gained admission to the private Teikoku School of Fine Arts (now Musashino Gakuin University). In order to become self-reliant, he politely declined financial assistance from his family and took on newspaper delivery jobs to support himself. However, after one semester, he had to drop out due to inability to pay the tuition.

Subsequently, in his pursuit to apply for the Tokyo School of Fine Arts (now Tokyo University of the Arts), Chang enrolled in the Ryoan Nihon School in Kyoto to obtain his high school diploma. At the same time, he attended evening classes at the Kansai School of Fine Arts. Despite five unsuccessful attempts to pass the entrance exam for the Tokyo School of Fine Arts, Chang continued his studies at the Kawabata Painting School. He also worked various jobs and began sketching portraits of passersby on the streets of Tokyo.

With the outbreak of the Pacific War, Chang Yi-hsiung left Japan and sought refuge with his elder brother, Dr. Chang Chia-ying, who was practicing medicine in Beijing. He married Chiang Pao-chu in 1945. After the end of World War II, he returned to Taiwan. In 1948, he was invited to work as an assistant lecturer at the Provincial Normal College (now National Taiwan Normal University). However, he resigned the following year due to difficulties adjusting to college life. Chang Yi-hsiung struggled in life and moved residences eight times in Taipei.

In 1950, he opened the "Pure Art Class" on the second floor of his bird shop. During this period, his creations often featured bold, rugged black lines and color blocks. His works received several awards in various exhibitions, including the first prizes in the 6th, 7th, and 8th Taiwan Provincial Art Exhibitions, as well as three Chairman's Awards in the Taiyang Art Exhibition. For example, in 1951, his piece "Playing the Trumpet" won the 6th Provincial Exhibition Arts Council Award. In 1952, his work "Autumn Night" earned the first prize in the 7th Provincial Exhibition Chairman's Special Selection. In 1953, his painting "Red Flowers" received the first prize in the 8th Provincial Exhibition Chairman's Award without examination.

In 1954, Chang Yi-hsiung, along with Liao Te-cheng, Hong Jui-lin, Chen De-wang, Chang Wan-chuan, Jin Run-zuo, and others, formed the "Epoch Art Association" and held several exhibitions in the following years. In 1963, he was appointed as an adjunct professor at the National Taiwan Academy of Arts (now National Taiwan University of Arts). In 1964, Chang received a substantial income from the sale of 64 pieces to an American collector named Frank, and he planned to emigrate to Brazil. However, he was deceived during a stopover in Japan and ended up staying there. In Japan, Chang created silhouette portraits on the streets and even collected scrap paper for a living. His wife took on laborious jobs like housekeeping and dish-washing, making their life quite challenging.

Following this period, his artistic style underwent a transformation with less black and more white in his works. In 1972, he became a member of the Japan Artists Association. In 1973, he returned to Taiwan and held a solo exhibition at the Provincial Museum (now National Taiwan Museum). Starting from 1977, he received sponsorship from the Tai Chi Gallery, becoming their exclusive artist and becoming the first brokered artist in the Taiwanese art scene. This sponsorship provided him with a stable source of income for his long-term stay in France.

In 1980, he made the decision to settle in France. He subsequently gained entry to Le Salon des Artistes Francais and Salon d'Automne . In 1987, he became the first Taiwanese artist to receive the French Artist Pension. Then, in 1988, he became the first Taiwanese painter to become a full member of the official Autumn Salon in France.

In 1988, Taiwan witnessed the 520 Farmer's Movement, marking the first intense clash between police and civilians in a social movement after the lifting of martial law. To show support for the farmers, Chang Yi-hsiung donated a hundred of his artworks the following year and held the "Chang Yi-hsiung Social Concern Charity Art Exhibition" in Taipei.

In 2003, he returned to Japan and settled there. At the age of 90, Chang Yi-hsiung discovered he was suffering from terminal prostate cancer. Despite this, he continued to paint. During this time, he even painted a portrait of Tsai Ing-wen, who was the chairperson of the Democratic Progressive Party at the time. At the age of 99, he fell into a coma at home and stopped painting.

In 2004, the National Museum of History held the "Chang Yi-hsiung Retrospective Exhibition at 90". In November 2013, the National Taiwan Museum of Fine Arts organized the "Sunday of Life: Chang Yi-hsiung 's Centenary Retrospective Exhibition". In 2014, Taipei's Shin Kong Mitsukoshi hosted the "Chang Yi-hsiung Centenary Exhibition - The Life of a Clown" touring exhibition. Chang Yi-hsiung died on May 27, 2016, at the Jisseikai Memorial Hospital in Japan.

== Artistic style ==
Chang Yi-hsiung's artistic style evolved beyond the influences of Impressionism, Post-Impressionism, Fauvism, Cubism, and Expressionism, developing into a distinctive personal style. His painting themes encompass still life, portraits, and landscapes. In his still life compositions, one can often find subjects like guitars and caged birds. His portraits are known for their vivid portrayal of ordinary people, especially those struggling to make a living in the streets. After relocating to France, he introduced a considerable number of European landscapes and clown figures into his repertoire. In his early works, Chang predominantly employed bold, heavy black lines and rich, dense color blocks, earning this period the moniker "Black Line Period." In his later years, during his extended stay in Paris, his palette shifted towards brighter tones, compositions became more succinct, marking the onset of what is referred to as the "White Period."
