= Zhang Qihua =

- Tiuⁿ Khé-hôa
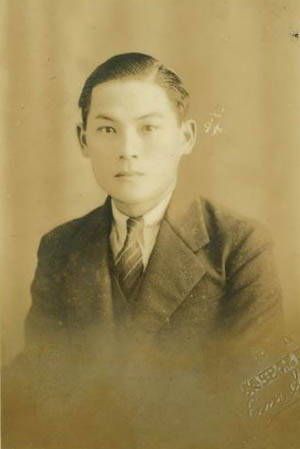
- 張啟華
- Born: 1910; Cianjhen, Kaohsiung, Japanese-occupied Taiwan
- Died: 1987 (aged 76–77); Ikebukuro, Toshima, Tokyo, Japan
- Citizenship: Japan (1910–1945); Republic of China (1945–1987)
- Education: Lingyaliao Public School (1919); Tainan Presbyterian Middle School (1927); Imperial Art School (1929)
- Occupation: Painter
- Spouse: Lîm Khîng-hâ (林瓊霞)
- Children: Tiunn Pik-siū (張柏壽, eldest son); Tiunn Pik-lîng (張柏齡, second son)

- Zhang Qihua
- Hàn-jī: 張啟華
- Pe̍h-ōe-jī: Tiuⁿ Khé-hôa
- Tâi-lô: Tiunn Khé-huâ

Zhang Qihua (Chinese: 張啟華; Pe̍h-ōe-jī: Tiuⁿ Khé-hoâ; Wade–Giles: Chang Chi-hua, 1910-1987) was a Taiwanese painter who co-founded the Kaohsiung Art Research Association with Liu Chi-hsiang and others, and was one of southern Taiwan's promoters of painting art.

== Life ==
Zhang Qihua was born in Cianjhen District, Kaohsiung. He studied at Lingyaliao Public School (now Lingzhou Elementary School) in 1919 (Taishō 8) and enrolled at Tainan Presbyterian Middle School (now Chang Jung Senior High School) in 1927 (Shōwa 2), but dropped out after one year.

In 1929 (Shōwa 4), he went to Tokyo to study at the Imperial Art School (now Musashino Art University). While studying in Japan, his works were selected for the "Sophora Tree Exhibition" and the "Independent Artists Association Exhibition". In the seventh year of the Showa Period (1932), he returned to Kaohsiung for his first solo exhibition. The following year, he married Lin Qiongxia (林瓊霞; =Lîm Khîng-hâ), the daughter of the wealthy Lin Jia.

After World War II, he served as a director of The Kaohsiung Third Credit Cooperative beginning in 1947, and held the position for 27 years. In 1952, he established the Kaohsiung Art Research Association with Liu Chi-hsiang and others, and later cooperated with the Tainan Fine Arts Association to organize the "Southern Exhibition". In 1954, his work Salted Fish was selected for first place in the Chairman's Award of the Provincial Exhibition. In 1967, his works were exempted from censorship at the provincial exhibition. Zhang Qihua also served as the curator and review committee member of the provincial exhibition. After 1968, he mainly participated in the "Southern Exhibition”, the "Taiyang Exhibition", and the "National Oil Painting Exhibition".

Zhang Qihua died in 1987, at the age of 77.
