= Ye Huocheng =

Taiwanese painter

Ye Huocheng (Chinese: 葉火城; 1908–1993) was a Taiwanese artist and educator. His paintings are often dominated by figures and landscapes, and he uses thick painting to express the texture and feel of the paintings. His paintings of rocks are particularly unique, and he is known as the "Father of Rocks."

== Life ==
In 1974, Ye Huocheng co-founded the Republic of China Oil Painting Association with artists like Yang San-lang and Li Mei-shu and devoted himself to art education and creation. In 1979, he returned to Taiwan, served as a judge for the 34th Provincial Art Exhibition, and held an exhibition at the Apollo Gallery. In the same year, he founded the Huludun Art Research Society with painters like Lee Shih-chiao, often holding sketching and educational activities. From 1980 to 1984, he exhibited works such as "Fishing Village Road," "Moon World," and "Small Pier" at the Provincial Art Exhibition. In 1985, he held a solo exhibition at the Wen Ying Hall of the Taichung City Dadun Cultural Center and published "Ye Huocheng Oil Painting Collection.《叶火城油画集》" In 1993, Ye Huocheng died of illness in his hometown of Fengyuan at the age of 86.
