= Chen Houei-kuen =

Taiwanese artist

Chen Huei-kuhn
- Born: June 25, 1907; Lungching Town, Taichung County
- Died: February 11, 2011 (aged 103); Taipei, Taiwan
- Education: Tokyo University of the Arts (fine arts)
- Known for: Visual arts
- Notable work: Hometown Lungching (1928), Freshwater downhill, (1960), Aerial view of Naples (1961)
- Awards: "Ten Outstanding Senior Artist Award", " Golden Harvest Award", " National Literary Award"

Chinese name
- Traditional Chinese: 陳慧坤
- Simplified Chinese: 陈慧坤
Transcriptions
Standard Mandarin
- Hanyu Pinyin: Chen Huikun

Chen Huei-kuhn (Chinese: 陳慧坤; pinyin: Chen Huikun; 25 June 1907 – 11 February 2011) was a Taiwanese artist, notable for being an activist in merching Chinese painting styles and techniques in art of Europe. Some of his work are considered as a fusion of Eastern Gouache, oil paintings and ink wash painting skills. Born in Lungching Hsiang, Taichung, Taiwan, and trained in Tokyo, Chen worked as a teacher in secondary school, as an art professor in universities for more than 45 years and a contemporary artist. He has a long history of involvement and contribution in contemporary art and education. His painting style integrate both eastern and western styles. Besides, he served as preparations for the provincial exhibition, faculty development, student exhibition of the committee, evaluation committee, council members. He also organised two dozens solo exhibition since 1962 and had won many prestigious awards like "Ten Outstanding Senior Artist Award", "Golden Harvest Award" and "National Literary Award". He is a well known artist and educationist.

== Early life ==
Chen was born in Lungching, a town in Taichung, Taiwan on 25 June 1907. In 1915, he went to Ta-too Township Public Schools and his father died in the same year. His mother died in 1920 and then he moved to his aunt's home and changed to study at Woo-tsih public school. After five months, he moved back to his hometown and lived with his grandmother. In 1928, he went to Japan for tertiary education at Tokyo School of Fine Arts. In 1929, he displayed his work in a museum in the name of “Nakajima Ltd.” with 13 other artists. In the same year, he married with his first wife. He graduated in March 1930, but he was unemployed for three years, but was selected twice for the Taiwan Art Exhibition. He was an art teacher at Taichung Business School between 1934 and 1945. His wife died in 1935. In 1939, he married with Hsieh Pee-lien but she died due to miscarriage. in 1946, he was employed for the student admission of Junior college of Taichung. Also, two of his art works were displayed in Taichung Art Exhibition.He was an art teacher at Taichung Business School between 1934 and 1945. His wife died in 1935. In 1939, he married with Hsieh Pee-lien but she died due to miscarriage. in 1946, he was employed for the student admission of Junior college of Taichung. Also, two of his art works were displayed in Taichung Art Exhibition. He was hired as a lecturer in National Taiwan Normal University. The next year, he was promoted to associate professor.

== Career and education ==
After graduating from Tokyo University of the Arts in 1931, Chen Huei-Kuhn was employed as a part-time teacher at Taichung Commercial School (now the National Taichung Institute of Technology) to demonstrate commercial art in 1934. After three years, his wife suffered a serious illness and died; he transferred to Hsin-kung Public school and served as a full-time substitute teacher with stable income. He married with his colleague Miss Hsieh Pee-lien, but after 2 years, he had lost two children and his second wife. However, he immersed himself in his artwork and concentrated on his Eastern Gouache works. Thus, his works such as “ Stroll in Freedom”, “Autumn Harvest”, “Scene of Lakefront” and “Mountain Hiking” were selected for the annual exhibition which inspired him a lot.

In 1945, Chen Huei-Kuhn left Hsin-kao Public School after losing his second wife and two children. He moved to Taichung First Girls High School and assigned to be the head of academic affairs at Taichuang City High School. After one year, Chen's “Appreciation” was on display at the First Provincial Art Exhibition and won the Academic and Industrial Award. After that, Chen was assigned as a lecture in the Department of Fine Arts at Provincial Normal College in 1947. Also, his Eastern Gouache work “Aboriginals in Taiwan” won the Chairman Award in the second year of the Provincial Art Exhibition. His artworks became more famous and Chen was promoted to an associate professor in 1948. At the same year, Chen had three paintings on display in the third year of Provincial Art Exhibition such as “Tam-shuei Scenery”, “Research Room for Ancient Art History” and “Stroll in Freedom”. After this exhibition, he became one of the member of the juror committee at the Art Exhibition for after years.

Whiling he was teaching at Provincial Normal College, he worked with the famous painter Pu Hsin-yue. This offer them a great opportunity to learn from each other. Since Chen was keen on exploring “how” and “why” and with good relationship with Pu xinyu, he was able to acquire new techniques and procedures. Chen Huei-Kuhn's desire is to improve the art form and he emphasised artistic, imaginative sketching instead of copying nature. Therefore, he created an innovative painting style which combined Eastern and Western art ideology and techniques. In order to study Eastern and Western art ideology and techniques, Chen made two research trips to Japan in the 1950s which were mainly for the purpose of studying art. In the 1960s, he studied in France for one year and he visited many art museums, putting his ideas into notes. Besides, he visited Spain, Italy, Belgium, the Netherlands and Germany sketching the places that he had traveled. Starting in 1969, he spent seven summer vacations in travel around the Europe to study and visit the great museums and buildings there. Chen produced a huge amount of artworks in the Europe travelling. After that, he held the “Tour in Europe Exhibitions” and there are total of 10 exhibitions were held. These exhibitions are the result of his studying in Eastern and Western art. For instance, in 1973 in France, he put oil paint on rice paper and adopting the painting skills and methods that used in showing the rocks and mountains in Chinese landscape painting to create “Mont Blanc”. Furthermore, he used western perspective techniques in eastern painting to create “The Gate of Temple Tosho” in 1982. It is the most well-known piece which took him more than one year to finish. The painting “Medici Fountain” also famous as it combinated of Eastern and Western techniques. With great contribution in artworks, Chen Huei-Kuhn's painting were regarded as the “Painting Symphony of Taiwan”.

From 1946, his art pieces was continually demonstrated in different exhibition and received numerous awards. He received the Academic and Industrial Award from The Province First Art Exhibition in 1946 and received Chairman Award from The Provincial Second Art Exhibition in 1967. In 1976, he devoting to education for 4 decades, and the Ministry of Education awarded him the Excellent Teacher Award. In 1989, Taichung County awarded Chen Houei-Kuen the Golden Tassel Award as one of the top 10 senior remarkable artists. In addition, he also received the Culture Award of Executive Yuan (1997), The Art & Business Awards of the Council for Cultural Affairs (1999), the president Lee Teng-hui awarded Order of Brilliant Star with Grand Cordon (2000) and the seventh National Award for Arts (2003) from the National Culture and Arts Foundation. Chen died on 11 February 2011 at National Taiwan University Hospital in Taipei. Chen's daughter is Tchen Yu-chiou.

== Notable works ==
Year	Title	Specification
1966	Freshwater Kuanyin Mountain	plastic color paper (200 x 98 cm)
1968	Very Falls	plastic color paper (184 x 129 cm)
1973	Alps	plastic color paper (73 x 92 cm)
1981	Chiang Kaishek Memorial Arch	Oil on canvas (55 x 46 cm)
1987	Chi Fangkan	Oil on canvas (55 x 46 cm)
1950	Poppy	plastic color paper (64 x 52 cm)
1959	Taroko	plastic color paper (73 x 58 cm)
1965	Fresh white mansions	Oil on canvas (61 x 50 cm)
1966	Ascenic nine	pastel paper (66.6 x 53 cm)
1967	Look Jueifang nine waterfront	plastic color paper (134 x 92 cm)
1968	Nine scenic	Oil on canvas (73 x 60 cm)
1969	Ning-hung Bee-sur-Marne	Oil on canvas (73 x 60 cm)
1972	The first peak of Yushan	plastic color paper (92 x 180 cm)
1973	Blanque first peak	plastic color paper (131 x 195 cm)
1975	Leuven suburbs	Oil on canvas (55 x 46 cm)
1978	Yeh-liou Fung-ching	plastic color paper (184 x 124 cm)
1979	Wuen-woo Court Tah-ying	plastic color paper (181 x 96 cm)
1981	Nikko Toshogu Tang-men	Oil on canvas (73 x 60 cm)
1981	Negrete City	plastic color paper (186 x 124.5 cm)
1982	Yosemite Valley, California	Oil on canvas (55 x 46 cm)

== Exhibitions ==
1.1952 on 4–12 May, Taiyang exhibition of painting "Woo-lai valley", "Smile", "can be high waterfall."

2.1956 on 10–20 August, Taiyang exhibition of painting "sister.

3.1957 on days 7 to 16 December, le province's art exhibition, painting exhibition "A level."

4.1957 on 21–27 August, Taiyang exhibition of painting "Tamkang afar."

5.1960 on days 25 to 29 May, Taiyang exhibition of painting "downhill."

6.1965 on 2–9 May, Chen Huei, double exhibition Lin Chang-tao, Taipei International Gallery.

7.1972 on 30 November to 5 December, a long stream of Painting, an exhibition of plastic colour "Yushan first peak."

8.1973 on 3–8 October, a long stream Painting, plastic color display "on the outskirts of Paris," "other house."

9.1974 on 3–8 December, a long stream Painting, plastic color display "Mt. Plateau."

10.1976, Professor exhibition - to commemorate the birthday of President Chiang Kai-shek Chiou-chih, painting exhibition "Blanque first peak."

11.1976, the Fine Arts Department of Normal - to celebrate the 30th anniversary, featuring painting "Riverside Belgium belfries."

12.1980, the annual literary sixty-nine of activities, painting exhibition "Wuen-woo Court reflection."

13.1982 year's Art Exhibition - Senior Artists Works Review, painting exhibition "hometown Lungching" painting "freshwater landscape" painting "Himeji Castle."

14.1983, the first session of the Kaohsiung Exhibition, an exhibition of Chinese painting "pull off the temple shrine."

15.1984, the second session of the Kaohsiung Exhibition, featuring paintings, "the San Francisco Bay."

16.1985 on 1 –15 October days, Lin Yuan-shoo really, Chen-Huei - three exhibition galleries Howard.

17.1985, the Fine Arts Department of Normal exhibition featuring paintings "hometown Lungching Chu-hang."

18.1985, le province's 40th anniversary retrospective art exhibition, painting exhibition "Ancient Art Research" painting "Do not desert Ha Palace of Versailles," painting "pine plains," painting "shows a lone pine alone."

19.1985 year to celebrate the recovery of Taiwan 40 Professor Chou-Nien exhibition featuring paintings "hometown Lungching Chu-hang."

20.1986, the third Kaohsiung art exhibition featuring paintings, "violinist."

21.1986, the Republic of the 11th National Art Exhibition, featuring paintings "hometown Lungching Chu-hang."

22.1986 year, to commemorate the centenary of Chiang Kai-shek and celebrate Veterans Day eighteenth exhibition, painting exhibition "Youth Park."

23.1987 on 11–20 October, Normal University professor Lin Yuan-shu really, Chen-Huei three exhibition galleries Howard.

24.1987, the contemporary character art exhibition of paintings "open."

25.1987, the ROC college professor art exhibition, painting exhibition "Mino sights."

26.1988, the Republic of contemporary art exhibitions, painting exhibition "Paris streets."

27.1988 years, Taichung County Artists Exhibition, an exhibition of traditional Chinese painting, "Chung-Cheng Kung-yuan Park Hon pool."

28.1988, Professor Normal exhibition, painting exhibition "Hanyee-nungsuhn" painting "Taiwan vulgar room."

29.1988, ROC art development exhibition of painting "Buddha Mountain view."

30.1989 on 4 –17 days of June, Chen-Chin, Lin Chen-Huei three plastic painting exhibition, (individual exhibition twenty), the National History Museum.

31.1989 years, high mountains Painting Exhibition - Commemorating the death of Chiang Ching-kuo system so Kung anniversary painting exhibition "Verde."

32.1990 on 28 September - 14 October, Lin Yuan-shu really, Chen-Huei - three exhibition, Howard Gallery.

33.1991 years, Professor Normal sixth exhibition, painting exhibition "Hon Chung-cheng Kung-yuan Yung-chih Park pool."

34.1991 on 27 April, the first session will be green water painting, painting exhibition "freshwater paiyang museum."

35.1992, the Republic of the 13th National Art Exhibition, featuring paintings "Yeh-liou harbour."

36.1992, the second session of the green water Painting, painting exhibition "Miles waves" 8F.

37.1992 years earlier art movement document Taiwan exhibition, painting exhibition "poolside" "Lungching home," painting "Untitled."

38.1993 years, contemporary Chinese painting masters painting exhibition, painting exhibition "Summer Palace Marble Boat."

39.1993, the artist in the eyes of freshwater, painting exhibition "freshwater paiyang Hall."

40.1993 on 1 to 16 May, the 3rd green water Painting, painting exhibition "Yeh-liou fishing port" 10 F, Taipei Gothic galleries.

41.1993 years, Taiwan senior artists work special exhibition of painting "lone pine alone show a" painting "Pinehill Plains" painting "Where Dough Huh Erh-sai desert palace."

42.1994, Taiwan artist's Who participated painting "Blanque first peak."

43.1994 years, the development of Taiwan painting retrospective painting exhibition "Geneva."

44.1994 on 18 to 31 May, the fourth green water tempera painting will be exhibited glue "on the outskirts of Tachih" 10F.

45.1994, the senior painter plastic colour exhibition, painting exhibition glue "Thom Dayton poolside Spring" glue tempera "Verde" glue tempera "mansion farmhouse" glue painting "on the outskirts of Matsuyama."

46.1994 years, Taipei - senior artists in France Paris exhibition of painting "Seine River"; Paris, France exhibited painting "Himeji Castle" painting "freshwater downhill" original "freshwater downhill study" painting " Freshwater street. "

47.1994 years, the image of the era of Kaohsiung Museum of Fine Arts: Painting Taiwan Development Review, painting exhibition "Geneva."

48.1995 on 1 to 28 July, the Republic of the 14th session of the National Art Exhibition, featuring paintings "Nanfang-ao."

49.1995 years, Taiwan predecessors Artists Works Exhibition (c), painting exhibition "Yeh-liou seaside" painting "Napoli bird's-eye view."

50.1995 year 80 senior beauty Artists exhibited painting "Geneva" painting "freshwater paiyang Pavilion", painting "Niagara Falls."

51.1995, Professor Normal exhibition, painting exhibition "Garden and the Maiden," painting "St. Louis suburbs," painting "Hangchou Jade Belt Bridge" painting "Niagara Falls."

52.1995 on 3 –15 days of June, the 5th green water Painting, painting exhibition "on the outskirts of le Paris."

53.1995, the 3rd long stream exhibition featuring "Mt. Original Plateaux."

54.1996 on 21 September - 3 October, will be the 6th green water painting, painting exhibition "Mu-lan afternoon" 4 F, painting "Phalaenopsis" 4 F.

55.1996 years, the Chinese contemporary masters painting hundred exhibition, painting exhibition "towering clouds" 20 F.

56.1997, the Kaohsiung Museum of Fine Arts held - French Impressionist masterpieces D'Orsaye Museum exhibition "Impressionism Lake east of Taiwan," painting exhibition by "hometown Lungching."

57.1997, the 7th green water Painting, painting exhibition "Bellflower" 10 F.

58.1998, the 8th green water Painting, painting exhibition "Orchids"; Kuo wood raw art exhibition centre "on the outskirts of Matsuyama," "City of the music", "pull off the temple shrine", "civil and military Taying Court."

59.1998, the National Art 15th, painting exhibition "Chialing."

60.1999, the art department NORMAL 50th anniversary, glue painting exhibition "Kikyo."

61.1999 16–24 October to May, will be the ninth green water painting, painting exhibition glue "on the outskirts of le Paris."

62.1999 In April–December, Shizuoka Prefectural Museum of Art and the Taipei Fine Arts Museum launched the "expansion and the establishment of the East Asian painting" (1850 ~ 1950), Shizuoka, Japan, Hyogo Prefecture, Tokushima Prefecture, Utsunomiya City, Fukuoka City travelling exhibition painting exhibition "hometown Lungching" painting "since like painting."

63.1999, 1999, famous paintings exhibition, painting exhibition, "St. Louis four towns. Lake scenery."

64.2000 September - 2001 February, the New York Cultural Centre organised the "Taiwan Spirit - Modern style and cultural heritage of the dialogue", the exhibition "Mei Ti-hsi fountain."

65. 23 September 2000, Chen Shuei-pien to move America into the house of God, the exhibition "Woolai Waterfall."

66.2001, the 11th green water Painting, an exhibition "on the outskirts of Matsuyama."

67.2002 on 3–19 May, Asia Art Centre and the National Taiwan Normal University, organised by "Taipei scenery: the beauty of monuments," exhibit "Taipei outskirts of the old house," "fresh white mansions."

68. 7 May 2002 –12 days, "Ink New Era - Exhibition of Contemporary Ink cross-strait exchanges," display "can be high waterfall."

69.2002 on 17–22 September, green water Painting, an exhibition, "Kenneth burdock blue."

70.2002 on 22 November - 1 December, the National Taiwan Museum of Fine Arts hosted "French Autumn Salon Exhibition: Focus temporal paintings - Taiwan" exhibition "Kazakhstan desert Versailles Palace do not."

71.2002 on 7 –18 days of December, exhibitors Taiwan Art Association "65 Taiyang 6 decades elegance."

72.2002 on 22 November - 1 December, the National Taiwan Museum of Fine Arts hosted the exhibition "French Autumn Salon."

73.2003 on 21 March - 25 May, drawing a long stream flow galleries president hosted "Time scale: 5 years of post-war Taiwan Art" exhibition, on display "Verde"

74.2003 on 19 April - 15 June, Taipei Fine Arts Museum hosted "50s Taiwan Art Exhibition" featuring "A level."

== Awards ==
1.1946, le province's First Art Exhibition, won the school production award, painting exhibition "Shang-hwa."

2.1947, le province's second session of the Art Exhibition, won the Chairman's Award, the exhibition "Taiwan vulgar room."

3.1976, the Ministry of Education issued "an excellent sampling of teachers' service 4 years.

4.1989 years, was the 1st artist in Taichung County Golden Harvest 10 Outstanding Senior Award.

5.1997 on 29 December, issued by the Executive Yuan, Executive Yuan Culture Award.

6.1999 on 26 April, issued by the Council for Cultural Affairs Wuen-hsin Award.

7.1999 on 29 December, by the Taipei City Government Honorary Citizen Award.

8.2000 on 5/5, President Lee Teng-huei presented the 2nd Order of Brilliant Star award.

9.2002 on 5/5, by the China Arts Association Literary Award honours.

10.2003 on 8 October, National Culture and Arts Foundation 7th National Literary Award.

== See also ==
- Taiwanese art

== Books (reference) ==
1. 家庭美術館 美術家傳記: 陳慧坤 2.蒼松映長春－陳慧坤九五回顧展專輯
