= Liao Chi-chun =

Taiwanese painter and sculptor

- 廖繼春
- Pronunciation: Liao Chi-chun
- Born: 4 January 1902; Taichung, Taiwan
- Died: 13 February 1976 (aged 74)
- Education: Taiwan Governor-General's National Language School; Tokyo School of Fine Arts
- Occupations: Painter, Sculptor
- Known for: Co-Founder of Tai-Yang Art Society 臺陽美術協會, Chih-Yang Western Painting Society
- Notable work: Tainan Confucian Temple (臺南孔廟) (painting)
- Television: Is a character in La Grande Chaumiere Violette 紫色大稻埕 (2016 TV series)
- Movement: abstractionism
- Awards: Female Nude selected for the 1st Taiwan Art Exhibition (Taiten)
Liao Chi-chun
- Traditional Chinese: 廖繼春
Transcriptions

Liao Chi-chun (1902–1976) was a Taiwanese painter and sculptor.

== Education ==
In 1918, he entered the Taiwan Governor-General's National Language School. By 1922, he graduated and began teaching at Fengyuan Public School (Fengyuan Kōgakkō). In 1924, he was accepted by the Normal Education Division in Painting of the Tokyo School of Fine Arts together with Tan Teng-pho, and studied under Japanese artist Tanabe Itaru.

During his lifetime, Liao nurtured many talents and was respected in the art community. In March 1927, he graduated from the Tokyo School of Fine Arts.

== Work and public life ==
After his graduation, he returned to Taiwan to teach art at the private Presbyterian Secondary School and the Girl’s Presbyterian Secondary School both located in Tainan.

Also in 1927, his works Female Nude and Still Life were selected for the first Taiwan Art Exhibition (Taiten); his later works were also selected for the same exhibition in successive years. In 1928, his work Courtyard with Banana Trees was selected for the Imperial Arts Exhibition (Teiten). Afterwards, his works were selected several times for the Teiten and the Ministry of Education Art Exhibition (Shin Bunten).

An active member of the art community, Liao was involved with art organizations such as the Chih-Yang Western Painting Society, the Chidao Association, and the Tai-Yang Art Society. Moreover, between 1932 and 1934, he served as a juror for the Taiten and, from 1946, he served as a juror for the Taiwan Provincial Art Exhibition. In 1947, he began teaching at Taiwan Provincial Normal College (later renamed to National Taiwan Normal University).

Liao Chi-chun’s works consist primarily of landscapes and still lifes. His early works focus especially on scenes from Southern Taiwan. During the 1950s and 1960s, his paintings demonstrated a bold use of color, as he began using bright and saturated reds, greens, yellows, and blues in his work. At the same time, the subjects of his paintings became more simplified. His works Tainan Confucian Temple and Southern Gate are representative works from this period.

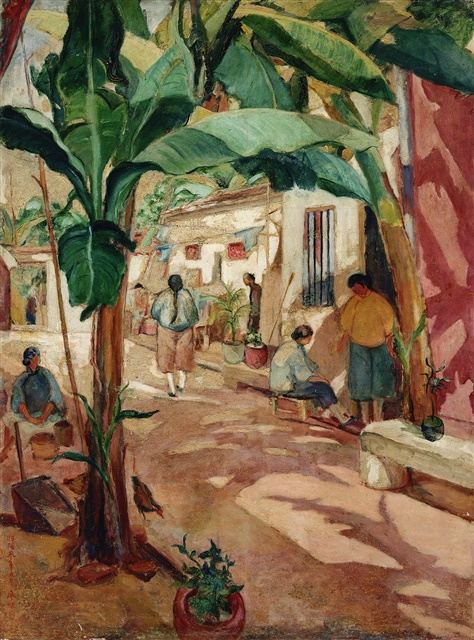
Courtyard with Banana Trees (1928)

In 1962, he was invited by the U.S. Department of State to visit Europe and America for a year, and held his first public exhibition in 1970 after returning from the United States. This exhibition demonstrated his successful integration of abstractionism into his painting style. His works from later years make use of bolder lines along with vivid and florid colors, demonstrating an unrestrained style. The objects in his paintings maintain a balance between figurative and abstract forms. Representative works from this style include: Yeliu Landscape (1972), Lion Dance (1973), Pintung Harbor (1975).

== See also ==
- Taiwanese art
