= Ni Chiang-huai =

Taiwanese artist (1894–1943)

- Gê Tsióng-huâi 倪蔣懷
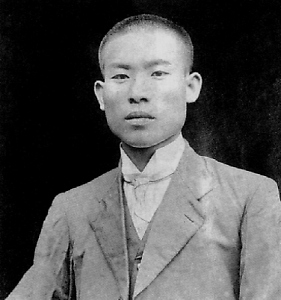
- 倪蔣懷(劉晏誠）Ni Ciang-huai (Liu Yancheng)
- Born: 12 August 1894; Taipeh Prefecture, Keelung Hall Kansai Seso（Now New Taipei City, Ruifang District）
- Died: 21 April 1943 (aged 48); Taihoku Prefecture, New Taipei City, Ruifang District
- Occupation: Painting

- Ni Chiang-huai
- Hàn-jī: 倪蔣懷
- Pe̍h-ōe-jī: Gê Chióng-hoâi
- Tâi-lô: Gê Tsióng-huâi

Birth name
- Hàn-jī: 君懷
- Pe̍h-ōe-jī: Kun-hoâi
- Tâi-lô: Kun-huâi

Ni Chiang-huai (12 August 1894 - 21 April 1943), formerly known as Jun Huai, was a Taiwanese artist who worked primarily in watercolor and was one of the earliest watercolor painters in Taiwan. His paintings often depict local features and serve as a record of Taiwan's early 20th century history.

== Life ==
=== Background and early education ===
Ni Chiang-huai was born in Gongguan, Miaoli, Taipei. His father, Ni Jiyuan, was a private school sinology sensei. His mother, Zheng, was originally married to Jiang Yin, but because Jiang Yin died young, she remarried Ni Jiyuan. In memory of her first husband, she changed Ni Junhuai's name to Ni Chiang-huai. As the son of a sinologist, Chiang-huai received instruction in poetry and calligraphy from a young age. From 1903 to 1909, Chiang-huai studied at Ruifang Public School and obtained a graduation certificate with first-class honors. He then passed the examination for the second-class teacher training course at Taipei National Language School.

While studying at the National Language School, Chiang-huai also attended correspondence courses at the Japanese "Imperial Calligraphy Society" and the "Nihon Art Academy Western Painting Department" outside class.

In 1910, when Chiang-huai was in the second grade of the National Language School, Ishikawa Kinichiro joined the school as a teacher of the four-year normal school's second-year drawing course. He was Ishikawa's earliest student in Taiwan. Other students who Ishikawa taught at the same time included Chen Chengbo, Chen Chengfan, Kuo Po-Chuan, Wang Baiyuan, etc. Although the class was only one hour a week, Chiang-huai and Ishikawa established a relationship as a teacher and friend during the three-year course. Under the influence of Ishikawa, Chiang-huai began to depict local environments in the form of sketching, becoming a pioneer of early watercolor painting in Taiwan. In 1913, the year he graduated from the National Language School, Chiang-huai passed the final test of the Western Painting Department of the Japan Art Academy. The following year, he and Ishikawa exhibited their works at the National Language School Elementary School.

=== Artistic Career Development ===
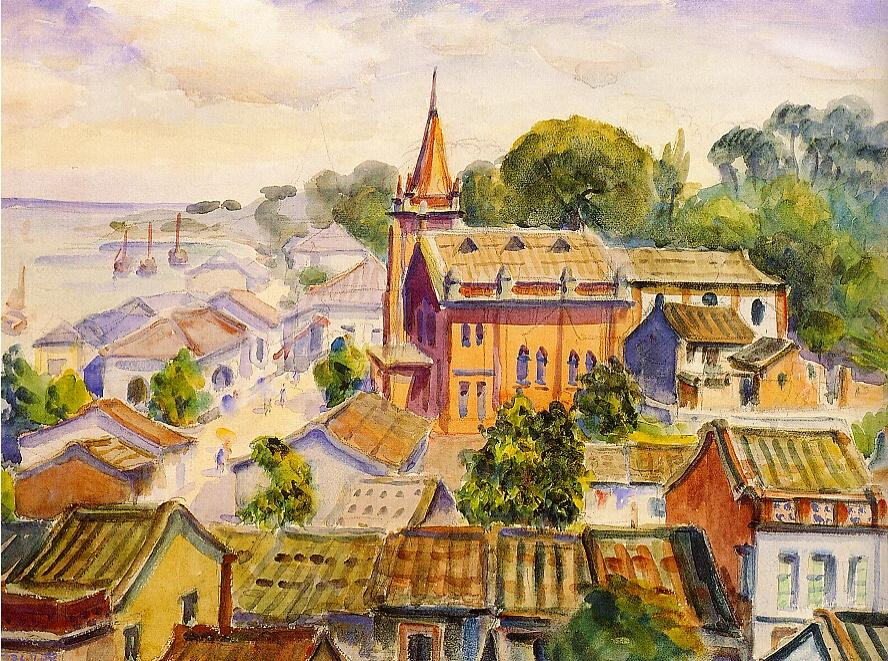
Tamsui Church/Ni Jianghuai/1936/Paper/Watercolor/49.5×66cm/ Collection of Taipei Fine Arts Museum

Jingmei Street by Ni Chiang-huai in 1914, is Taiwanese's earliest watercolor painting. He is, therefore, known as Taiwan's first watercolor painter or Taiwan's first Western painter. In 1917, his "Trees" won the second prize in the first "Spring Bird Festival", the first time that a Taiwanese artist was selected. Influenced by his classmates who went to study in Japan, Chiang-huai also wanted to go to Japan for further studies. However, considering his family and the difficult situation for Taiwanese artists to make a living at that time, Ishikawa persuaded him not to study abroad. Therefore, Chiang-huai gave up further studies and, under the persuasion of his brother-in-law, devoted himself to the development of the mining industry. He also supported and promoted Taiwanese art activities through sponsorship, making him the first art sponsor and watercolor collector in Taiwan.

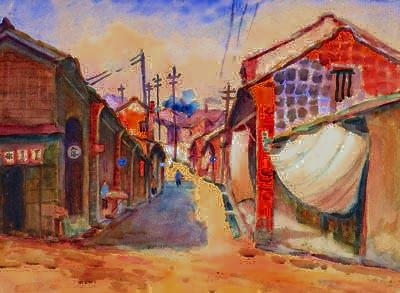
Xizhi District Street / Ni Jianghuai / 1929 / Watercolor / Collection of Taipei Fine Arts Museum

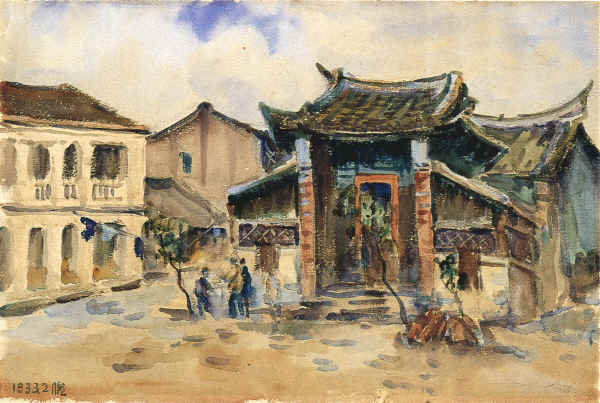
Zhenren Temple/ Ni Jianghuai/ 1933/ paper/ watercolor/ 33 x 48.5 cm

Although Chiang-huai did not continue his studies or become a full-time artist, he maintained contact with his mentor, Ishikawa, and his colleagues. He also painted frequently after work. Until nearly two years before he died in 1943, he exhibited two paintings at the Japan Watercolor Society almost yearly. Ni Jianghuai was elected a member of the Japan Watercolor Society in 1926, and from 1927 onwards, he was selected for the Western Painting Division of the first to third Taiwan Exhibitions with "Mountain Street," "Sunset at Shuangxi" and "Back Street" respectively. He often sketched near the mines where he worked or the mining company offices and recorded the time, weather, local characteristics, and key points of expression in detail. The largest number of Chiang-huai's works are from 1914 to 1938, seemingly in the form of diary-like paintings. During his peak period, he mostly painted mining cities in northern Taiwan and Port of Keelung, where he lived, as well as important new Western-style buildings in Taipei City and Dadaocheng. He also went to Nantou, Fengshan, Sichongxi, and Eluanbi for sketching. Unlike Hung Jui-lin a miner and painter, Chiang-huai recorded the simple local scenery around him by inspecting the daily work of the mines. Comparing his sketchbooks, diary texts, and watercolor works, we can see the context of his creative transformation and his reflection on his works.

=== Old age ===
In 1936, due to illness, Chiang-huai switched from outdoor sketching to indoor painting. He believed the difficulty in developing Taiwan's art was that the cultural development was not comprehensive enough, so he began preparing to establish an art museum. Chiang-huai had completed his preset art museum blueprint in his diary and actively purchased Chinese and Western art for the museum's collection. However, he was bedridden due to kidney disease in 1941 and died in 1943 at the age of 50. On April 21, 2023, Ni Jianghuai's descendants donated nearly 500 of his creations, collections of artworks, and documents to the Taipei Fine Arts Museum.

== Contribution to Taiwanese art ==
Chiang-huai was an artist, promoter, and sponsor of the development of Taiwanese art. In 1924, Chiang-huai, Chen Chih-chi, Chen Yingsheng, Chen Chengfan, Ran In-ting, and others established the "Seven Stars Painting Society" in the name of "Seven Stars Mountain," the spiritual symbol of Taipei. It was the first painting group composed of Taiwanese people at that time., they held oil painting and watercolor painting exhibitions at the National Taiwan Museum every year. At the same time, he also sponsored the "Taiwan Watercolor Painting Society" led by Ishikawa. In addition to providing funds for annual exhibitions, this fund was also used to invite Japanese watercolor painters to provide works for viewing and lectures. However, four years after the establishment of the Seven Stars Painting Circle, because its members were scattered in four places, it was disbanded at the suggestion of Chen Chih-chi. In 1929, the "Red Island Society" was formed. Chiang-huai was still the main member, and along with him there were He Delai, Fan Hongjia, Zhang Qiuhai, Guo Baichuan, Chen Ching-fen, Chen Yingsheng, Chen Houei-kuen, Chen Chih-chi, Chen Houei-kuen, Tan Teng-pho, Yang San-lang, Liao Chi-chun, and Lan Yinding, a total of 14 people. At the same time as establishing the Red Island Society, Ni Jianghuai established the "Taiwan Painting Research Institute" in the capital. Ishikawa, Chen Zhiqi, Yang Sanlang, and Lan Yinding instructed it. It was the earliest private art cram school in Taiwan. The institute was closed three years after its establishment. During this period, there were about 25 students who received an education, including important Taiwanese painters such as Hong Ruilin, Chang Wan-chuan, and Chen De-wang. After 1936, Ni Jianghuai supported the "Taiwan Watercolor Painting Society" and the "Yilu Society" formed by Ishikawa's students and helped young people.

== Filmography ==
In 2016, he played a role in the TV series "Purple Rice Field," played by Ko Chia-yen etc.

== Related Entries ==
- Kinichiro Ishikawa
- Linkaijun Mansion
