= Chen Yingsheng =

Taiwanese painter (1898–1961)

- Born: December 16, 1898; Taihoku Prefecture, Taiwan, Empire of Japan
- Died: May 28, 1961 (aged 62); Taipei, Taiwan
- Citizenship: Japan（1898–1945); Taiwan (1945–1961)
- Known for: Painting
- Notable work: Back Alley; Studio; Evening Meal; Primitive Village
- Spouse: Su Xiao
- Children: Chen Biyun; Chen Xuebao

Chinese name
- Traditional Chinese: 陳英聲
- Hanyu Pinyin: Chén Yīng Shēng
- Wade–Giles: Ch'en Ying Sheng

Chen Yingsheng (Chinese: 陳英聲; pinyin: Chén Yīng Shēng; December 16, 1898 – May 28, 1961) was a Taiwanese painter and part of Taiwan's first generation of Western painters. He pioneered new art in Taiwan during the Japanese colonial period and actively participated in early painting club activities in Taiwan. He was the teacher of Kuo Hsueh-hu and Xu Yuyan (wife of Yang San-lang). He was also one of the first Taiwanese painters to travel to Korea for sketching during the Japanese colonial period.

== Life ==
Chen Yingsheng was born at No. 78, Penglai Town, Taipei City, Taihoku Prefecture during the Japanese colonial period. His father, Chen Zhiqing, was a Chinese medicine doctor, poet, and industrialist. His mother was Zhang Yuchou.

Chen graduated from Dadaocheng Public School in 1913 and entered the Normal Department of the Taiwan Governor-General's Office National Language School in 1914. He was taught by Ishikawa Kinichiro, who was also teaching at the school at the time and began studying Western painting.

After graduating in 1918, he taught at Dadaocheng Second Public School (Nissin Public School). During this period, he once mentored Kuo Hsueh-hu, who was a third-year student at the time. In 1921, when he taught at Dadaocheng Girls' Public School, he also mentored Xu Yuyan. When he taught at Penglai Public School from 1922 to 1936, he continued to encourage and prepare students to paint and to develop their interest in painting. During this period, he taught attentively at school and promoted community cultural activities, winning many awards for outstanding contributions. In 1922, he published the nursery rhyme "Niu Ah Niu Ah", which is still popular today. On January 31 of the same year, Chen married Su Xiao, the third daughter of Su Liangdeng, a tea merchant. On January 6, 1923, his eldest daughter, Chen Biyun was born. On December 8, 1927, his third son, Chen Xuebao was born. Chen Xuebao later married Hong Song and in December 1960, had a son name Chen Yiche on Datong Street in Taipei City, the eldest grandson of Chen Yingsheng.

== Dedicated to promoting new art, the peak period of creation ==
In 1924, under the encouragement of Ishikawa Kinichiro, Chen Yingsheng, Ni Chiang-huai, Chen Chengbo, Chen Chengfan, Lan Yinding, Chen Zhiqi, and Chen Yinyong established the Seven Stars Painting Circle. It was the first group to promote Taiwanese artists and painters. Since 1926, it has held a joint exhibition of members' works at the Taipei Museum (the predecessor of the current National Taiwan Museum) every year.

In July 1928, he traveled to Manchuria, Korea, and Japan for sketching. He was one of the first Taiwanese painters to visit Korea for artistic endeavors during the Japanese occupation. His works from this period include Golden State Sunset (金州斜陽), Pyongyang Taedong River(平壤 大同江), Pyongyang Lianguang Pavilion (平壤 練光亭), Gumgang Mountain Jiulongyuan (金剛山 九龍淵), and Dalian Tiger Stall (大連 老虎攤), among others. According to relevant documents, Lan Yinding also accompanied him on this journey.

After returning to Taiwan, he held a solo exhibition showcasing 30 works from his travels in mainland China. This exhibition was held at the "Dadaocheng Penglai Pavilion" (大稻埕蓬萊閣) from November 16 to 20 of the same year. Between 1934 and 1935, he traveled to Dawu Mountain Village in Pingtung with Mr. Lan Yinding for further sketching. His works from this period include Mountain Landscape (Kabiyang Society) (山地風景 (卡卑揚社)), Dawu's Early Spring (大武的初春), and Primitive Village (原始之村). Notably, Mountain Landscape (Kabiyang Society) (山地風景 (卡卑揚社)) was exhibited at the National Taiwan Literature Museum as part of the Cultural Association Centennial Special Exhibition in May 2021.

From 1924 to 1936, he actively participated in the operations of various painting associations. These included the Seven Stars Painting Forum (1924), the Taiwan Watercolor Painting Association (1927), the Taiwan Western Painting Free Research Institute (1929), which was renamed the Taiwan Painting Research Institute the following year, the Akashima Society (赤島社) (1929), the Yilu Society (廬會) (1932), and the Japan Watercolor Painting Association (1934). Through these associations, he contributed to the promotion of Western watercolor painting movements and facilitated artistic exchanges.

During this period, his works were recognized in prominent exhibitions. His painting Back Alley (後巷) was selected for the 3rd Taiwan Watercolor Exhibition in 1929, while Studio (畫室) was featured in the 4th Taiwan Watercolor Exhibition in 1930. Additionally, his works Evening Meal (夕膳) and Primitive Village (一原始之村) were exhibited in the 21st Japan Watercolor Exhibition (1934) and the 23rd Japan Watercolor Exhibition (1936), respectively.

== Public affairs and business period ==
In addition to being committed to promoting new art, Chen Yingsheng and his wife, Su Xiao, were also active in early childhood education and ran the "Dadaocheng Kindergarten" in Hong Kong Town from 1925 to 1947. His wife, Su Xiao (who served as the principal of Dadaocheng Kindergarten) published her experience in kindergarten education on "Parent Re-education" in the magazine "Taiwan Women's World" in April 1937.

From 1937 to 1947, he participated in many public affairs and business activities. He served as a review member and director of the Taipei City North District Life Improvement Association (the predecessor of the current Taipei City Library Yanping Branch) and the eight-person anonymous group of the Monopoly Bureau of the Taiwan Governor's Office. Member (wholesaler); director of the Taipei Chamber of Commerce and Industry and secretary of the Taiwan Tea Merchants Association, etc. He can be described as an extremely active businessperson in the contemporary era.

His name was changed to Tokuyama Tadayama on December 28, 1940 (Showa 15), and subsequent paintings were signed with Tokuyama Tadayama.

== Old age ==
Chen was registered and lived in Minato Town 3-chome No. 44 from 1925 to 1947. In February 1948, he was registered in Gangu Street, Yanping District. He died in Datong Street, Taipei City, on May 28, 1961.

Chen gave eight paintings to his eldest daughter, Chen Biyun, when she got married in 1950 as a souvenir, which was collected by future generations of the family. In addition, it is currently only known that the Shunyi Taiwan Museum of Art collected a watercolour painting of "Street Scene Porter" by Chen, and it was exhibited at the Taipei International Art Fair in October 2020; there is another work titled The oil on wood panel titled "Lady Picture" is in Chen Chengbo's collection and appears in the seventh volume of Chen Chengbo's complete works, Personal Historical Materials (II).

== Famous and surviving works ==
Title of work	years	Awards	illustrate
Jinzhou setting sun金州斜陽	1928		Traveling to Jinzhou, Manchuria and sketching Exhibited at Penglai Pavilion in Dadaocheng in November of the same year
Pyongyang Taedong River平壤 大同江	1928		Traveling to Daedong River in Pyongyang, North Korea and sketching Exhibited at Penglai Pavilion in Dadaocheng in November of the same year
Pyongyang Yeongwangjeong Pavilion平壤 練光亭	1928		Traveling to Daedong River in Pyongyang, North Korea and sketching Exhibited at Penglai Pavilion in Dadaocheng in November of the same year
Kumgang Mountain Guryongyuan金剛山 九龍淵	1928		Traveling and sketching in Gunyongyuan, Mount Kumgang, Pyongyang, North Korea Exhibited at Penglai Pavilion in Dadaocheng in November of the same year
Dalian Tiger Stall大連 老虎攤	1928		Traveling to Laohutan, Dalian, Manzhou and sketching Exhibited at Penglai Pavilion in Dadaocheng in November of the same year
back alley後巷	1929	Selected for the 3rd Taiwan Exhibition	
studio畫室	1930	Selected for the 4th Taiwan Exhibition	
Liaoyang twelve-story pagoda遼陽十二層塔	unknown		Postcard to Mr. Chen Chengbo in January 1933
Dinner夕膳	1934	Selected for the 21st Japan Watercolor Exhibition	Postcard to Mr. Chen Chengbo in January 1934
Still life (three products)靜物(三品)	Estimate 1933-1934		It has similar interest to "Dinner" which was selected for the Japanese Watercolor Exhibition in 1934. It will be exhibited at the "National Museum of Taiwan Literature-Centennial Special Exhibition of the Association for Literary and Art Circles" in May 2021.
Still Life(Food)靜物(佳餚)	Estimate 1933-1934		It has similar interest to "Dinner" which was selected for the Japanese Watercolor Exhibition in 1934.
Mountain scenery (Kabyanshe)山地風景（卡卑揚社）	1934-1935		Traveling with Mr. Lan Yinding to the villages of Dawu Mountain in Pingtung for sketching It will be exhibited at the "National Museum of Taiwan Literature-Centennial Special Exhibition of the Association for Literary and Art Circles" in May 2021.
Early Spring in Dawu大武的初春	1934-1935		Traveled with Mr. Lan Yinding to the villages of Dawu Mountain in Pingtung to sketch, and sent a postcard to Mr. Chen Chengbo in January 1935
Primitive Village原始之村	1934-1935	Selected for the 23rd Japan Watercolor Exhibition	Traveling with Mr. Lan Yinding to the villages of Dawu Mountain in Pingtung for sketching
Street Porter街景挑夫	unknown		It is now collected by Shunyi Taiwan Museum of Art and was exhibited at the Taipei International Art Fair in October 2020.
Lady picture仕女圖	unknown		Presented to Mr. Chen Chengbo and collected by the Chen Chengbo Foundation. It is the only oil painting on wood currently preserved.
