= Chang Wan-chuan =

Taiwan artist

Chang Wan-chuan (May 28, 1909 – January 12, 2003) was born in Tamsui, Taipei, Taiwan. He is one of the early 20th-century Taiwanese painters who traveled to Japan for the study of Western painting. His artistic creations are primarily characterized by the styles and techniques of Expressionism and Fauvism.

== Early life and education ==
Chang Wan-Chuan was born in Tamsui on May 28, 1909. His father, Chang Yung-Ching (1877–1945), worked at the Tamsui Customs at the time. At the age of 32, his father joyfully welcomed his eldest son and named him "Wan-chuan" with the intention of "passing on everything," which resonates with the pronunciation of "Man-chuan" in Taiwanese Hokkien.

In 1924, Chang graduated from the higher department of the Shilin Public School, and his family moved to Dadaocheng in Taipei. In 1929, he learned about the recruitment of students by the Western Painting Research Institute.

On July 1, 1929, the Western Painting Research Institute was founded with funding from Ni Chiang-Huai. Chang learned sketch, watercolor, oil painting, and so on from Ishikawa Kinichiro, and he also met Lan Yin-Ding, Ni Chiang-huai, Chen Chi-chi, and Yang San-lang there and became bosom friends with Hong Jui-lin and Chen Te-wang.

In 1930, Chang Wan-chuan, along with Hung Jui-lin and Chen De-wang, went to Japan to study art. After arriving in Tokyo, the three of them rented a house with Chen Chih-chi, Li Mei-shu, and Li Shih-chiao. At that time, Li Mei-shu had just been admitted to the Tokyo School of Fine Arts, while Li Shi-chao was preparing for his third attempt at the entrance exam for the Tokyo School of Fine Arts. To enhance his exam readiness, Chang Wan-chuan enrolled in the Kawabata Art School and the Honjo Painting Research Institute for further studies.

In 1931, Chang Wan-chuan, Hong Rui-lin, and Chen Te-wang all passed the entrance exam for the Western Painting Department of the Imperial Art School. In 1932, Chang Wan-chuan decided to drop out of the Imperial School of Fine Arts due to the limited focus on creative courses. He turned to self-study and continued to hone his drawing skills through the study of books and sketchbooks, as well as attending private art schools for practice and creation. Although Chang Wan-chuan did not enter the traditional academy system to study fine arts, his work "Market in front of the Temple" was still selected for the 6th Taiwan Exhibition in 1932.

== Career ==
In 1936, Chang Wan-chuan joined the Taiyang Art Association with Hong Rui-lin and Chen Te-wang, and exhibited at the second Taiyang Exhibition. In 1937, during a visit to Xiamen, he befriended Xu Shengji and together they formed the Qingtian Art Society. In 1938, Chang Wan-chuan, Chen Te-wang, Hong Rui-lin, Chen Chun-te, Hsu Chao-chi, and Huang Ching-cheng formed the Mouve Art Group. That same year, Chang Wan-chuan, Hong Rui-lin, and Chen Te-wang left the Taiyang Art Association.

In 1938, the first Provincial Exhibition opened, and Chang Wan-chuan was awarded a special prize for his work "Gulangyu Scenery", which depicted the scenery of Xiamen.

In 1939, Chang Wan-chuan returned to Taiwan and took on an administrative role at the Ruifang Mine managed by Ni Chiang-huai. That year, he also participated in the Provincial Exhibition once again and was selected with his work "Church on Gulangyu Island".In 1942, his work "Scenes of Xiamen" was selected for the 5th Provincial Exhibition.In 1943, his painting "Southern Scenery" depicting the scenery of Tainan was selected for the 6th and also the last Provincial Exhibition.

=== After World War II ===
In 1946, Chang Wan-chuan was invited to work as a physical education teacher at Jianguo High School, where he reorganized the school's rugby team and was responsible for some of the disciplinary work.

In 1947, the "228 Incident" occurred in Taiwan. Chang Wan-chuan initially took refuge in his ancestral home in Yangmingshan, but later sought shelter with his elder brother Zhang Wanju, who was practicing medicine in Jinshan. It was during this time that he met Ms. Hsu Bao-yueh, a nurse working in the clinic.

Chang Wan-chuan worked as a fisherman in the small fishing village of Jinshan while continuing to create art. During this period, he began to draw a large number of "fish". The "fish" served as an important theme in his creations. It not only represented the everyday objects he encountered, but also symbolized the gratitude he felt towards Hsieh Guo-yong, who managed fish ponds during his southern exhibitions. Additionally, it carried his fond memories of his father, who loved eating fish.

In 1948, Chang Wan-chuan returned to teaching and became an art teacher at Taipei Datong High School. The following year, he married Ms. Hsu Bao-yueh. In 1950, Chang also became an art teacher at Yanping High School, and in 1952, he re-joined the Taiyang Art Association.

In 1954, Chang Wan-chuan, along with Hong Rui-lin, Chang Yi-hsiung, Liao Te-chen, Chin Run-zuo, and others, founded the "Epoch Art Association" and held their first exhibition at the Mei-er-Lian Gallery in Taipei. That same year, he co-founded the "Sunday Painters Club" with other teachers from Taipei Datong High School, such as Chen Te-wang (陳德旺, 1910-1984), Tsai In-tang.

In 1955, Zhang withdrew from the Taiyang Art Association, and in 1956, the Epoch Art Association disbanded. In 1964, Zhang was recruited as a teacher for the night program of the National Arts College's Fine Arts Department.

=== Retirement ===
In 1972, Chang Wan-chuan, inspired by his friend Hong Jui-lin who had retired and moved to the United States, decided to retire as well. That same year, he retired from Taipei Datong High School.

In 1975, Chang Wan-chuan embarked on a two-year journey to Europe, followed by travels to various countries in Japan and the Americas, leading a nomadic lifestyle for a total of 15 years.

It wasn't until 1996 when Chang Wan-chuan returned to Taiwan to undergo cataract removal surgery. In 1997, the Taipei Fine Arts Museum held a retrospective exhibition, "Chang Wan-chuan's 88th Exhibition," in honor of his contributions to the art world.

Chang Wan-chuan died in 2003 at the age of 95.

== Artistic style and contributions ==
Although Zhang Wanchuan did not receive formal art education from an art academy, he actively engaged in self-study, travel for artistic exploration, observation, and continuous creation. He was selected multiple times for official art exhibitions and was a prominent figure in the Taiwanese art scene. He enthusiastically participated in the establishment and activities of art movements and artistic groups, making him one of the important pioneering artists in 20th-century Taiwanese art history. His works encompassed various themes including landscapes, figures, fish, and still life. He used various mediums such as oil painting, watercolor, and sketching, as well as printmaking, showcasing a distinctive style characterized by expressionism and elements of the Fauvist movement. Zhang also contributed to art education by teaching at institutions like Xiamen Academy of Fine Arts, Taipei Datong High School, Yanping High School, and the Night Division of the National Taiwan Normal University's Department of Fine Arts. After his passing, the Taipei Fine Arts Museum held the "Zhang Wanchuan Centennial Exhibition" in 2008, and the Sun Yat-sen Memorial Hall organized the "Surge – Zhang Wanchuan 110th Anniversary Exhibition" in 2019.
