= Yen Shui-long =

Taiwanese painter and sculptor (1903–1997)

- 顏水龍
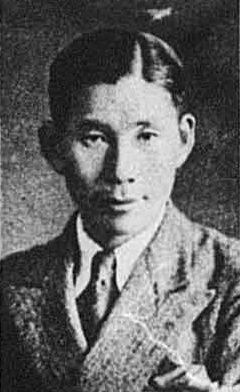
- Born: 5 June 1903; Ensuikō Chō, Japanese Taiwan (modern-day Xiaying, Tainan, Taiwan)
- Died: 24 September 1997 (aged 94); Taichung, Taiwan
- Education: Kaei Public School; Tainan Provincial Teachers’ Training School; Tokyo School of Fine Arts; Académie d’Art Moderne
- Notable work: Author of Taiwan’s Arts and Crafts (臺灣工藝) (book); From Agricultural to Industrial Society (從農業社會到工業社會) (mosaics)
- Awards: His commercial advertisements for Osaka Smoca Tooth Powder Company were later collected in a series that became a classic exemplar of Japanese advertising design in the 1930s.

Yen Shui-long (Chinese: 顏水龍; pinyin: Yán Shuǐlóng; 5 June 1903 – 24 September 1997) was a Taiwanese painter and sculptor, folk craft researcher, and art educator, who spent most of his life researching and promoting Taiwanese handicrafts, as well as cultivating Taiwanese folk craft talents. Yen was born in Ensuikō Chō, Japanese Taiwan (modern-day Xiaying, Tainan, Taiwan), after 1950, Yan began focusing his works on both the indigenous people and scenery of Taiwan, manifesting his dedication to the land and culture of his home island.

Yen is credited with laying the foundation for both modern crafts and modern art and design in Taiwan. He is also a pioneer in researching and depicting the indigenous culture of Taiwan.

== Education ==
By the time he was thirteen, both of Yen's parents, as well as his grandmother, had died. His older sister had married, so Yen had to take care of himself. After completing two years of training at the Tainan Teachers’ Training School (台南州教員養成所) in 1918, Yen was hired as the youngest schoolteacher at the public elementary school in present-day Xiaying District. A fellow teacher convinced Yen to pursue art in Japan, and he subsequently enrolled in the Kaei Public School (Kaei Kōgakkō). He went to Japan in 1920, and was admitted into the Western Painting Division of the Tokyo School of Fine Arts two years later.

In 1922, Yen successfully enrolled in the Western Painting Department of the Tokyo Fine Arts School, through a combination of work and study, and there he became acquainted with fellow Taiwanese students in Japan, including Wang Baiyuan, Zhang Qiu-mei, and Liao Chi-chun. During this time, Yen studied under the tutelage of Fujishima Takeji and Okada Saburosuke; both Fujishima Takeji’s rigorous painting style and the craft collection in the home of Okada made a deep impact on Yen.

By 1927, he entered graduate school at the same institute to study under Fujishima Takeji, Okada Saburousuke, and Wada Eisaku. He returned to Taiwan in 1929 and held a solo exhibition to raise funds for further studies in Paris. Yen's further education in art was partly funded by Lin Hsien-tang.

In 1929, Yen began studying in France, thanks to financial support from Lin Hsien-Tang from Wufeng. On August 11, 1930, Yen boarded the Trans-Siberian Railway and arrived in France on the 28th of the same month. During his time in France, Yen stayed at the Maison du Japon, which provided accommodation for Japanese students, while he studied at the Académie de la Grande Chaumière and Acadèmie Art Moderne. In 1931, Yen was selected for the Salon d'Automne in France, with his works La Jeune Fille and Parc de Montsouris. Yen’s works were influenced by Jean Marchand and Joseph Fernand Henri Léger. In 1932, Yen met painter Kees van Dongen when he was recovering from an illness in Cannes, and he was influenced by the decorative colors in Van Dongen’s works. In June of the same year, Liu Chi-hsiang and Yang San-lang traveled by ship to study in France, and Yen was there to greet them when they arrived at the port of Marseille. By the October of 1932, because of his liver disease, Yen had spent all his savings, so he ended his student life in France and returned to Japan.

== Career ==
To make a living, in 1933 Yen began working in commercial design at SMOCA Co., Ltd, in Osaka. At the time, few people who entered the field of commercial design had a fine art background, thinking that advertisements were too profit-oriented. However, a toothpowder advertisement designed by Yen for SMOCA was popularly received. Between 1933 and 1944, apart from working in Osaka, Yen was also appointed by the Governor-General’s Office in Taiwan to return to Taiwan to promote craft art. In 1940, Yen established the “South-Asia Arts and Crafts Society” in the Beimen region of Xuejia, Tainan Prefecture, tutoring locals to create everyday objects using Shortleaf Galingale which they had planted themselves; such objects included mats, bags (also known as Ka-Tsi), shoes, and hats. Yen also revamped the Ka-Tsi to make a new style of handbag, which was exported to Japan and Mainland China, and which became immensely popular during wartime.

The works that Yen created during his middle age centered around craft art, and he established the “Tai-Yeng Art Association”(臺陽美術協會), which included figures such as Yang San-lang and Liao Chi-chun, in 1934 and 1937, respectively. Yen also founded the Taiwan Design Art Association, with a number of others, including Chang Wan-chuan, Chen De-wang, Fan Zhuo-zao, Huang Ching-cheng, Hung Jui-lin, Lan Yun-deng, and Hsieh Kuo-yung. In 1942, at the age of 40, Yen married Jin Mao-zhi, and the couple moved to Tainan two years later. The following year, Yen was appointed as an assistant professor at the Department of Architectural Engineering of Tainan Technical College (present-day National Cheng Kung University 國立成功大學), teaching sketching and the history of art craft, dedicating his efforts to promoting Taiwanese craft. Yen also participated in the project of repairing Chihkan Tower, which was led by the then Tainan City mayor, Hatori Matao.

With the regime change in 1945, the Taiwan Provincial Tainan Junior College of Technology was reformed and became the “Taiwan Provincial College of Engineering School,” and then two years later (1949) it became the “Taiwan Provincial Tainan Institute of Technology”. Yen remained appointed as a professor, and he retired in July 1949, following which he proceeded to work as the director of the design section at the Taiwan Province Craft Production Promotional Committee, continuing to dedicate his efforts to the promotion and production of handicrafts. At the same time, he was already a juror for the “Taiwan Provincial Fine Art Exhibition”, while he also continued to paint. In 1950, he released works featuring indigenous culture, including Aboriginal Girl. The female figures are always adorned in elaborate clothing and accessories, reflecting the beauty and dignity of indigenous culture.

In 1951, Yen was appointed as the technical consultant of the Reconstruction Department of Taiwan Provincial Government, where he was responsible for guiding the development of Taiwanese handicrafts. To fulfill his post, he once again conducted research on handicrafts all over Taiwan, drafting various revitalization proposals and holding handicrafts workshops in different counties and cities, teaching participants to make artificial flowers made with Chinese Rice Paper Plant (Tetrapanax papyrifer), embroidery, weaving, bamboo work, rattan work, and others. Yen also published the book Formosa Industrial Art. In 1953, the Reconstruction Department established the Handicrafts Display Room at the Provincial Industrial Research Institute on Zhongshan South Road of Taipei City, where he participated in both the displays and research activities.

In 1954, the Joint Commission on Rural Reconstruction appointed Yen as the consultant for the Agricultural Economics Division, for which he was asked to conduct a comprehensive survey on the handicrafts of Taiwan; he also received funding to travel to Japan for research, collecting materials, and reorganizing a project to revive the handicrafts of Taiwan. In 1955, the “Mutual Defense Treaty between the United States of America and the Republic of China” took effect, and this marked the beginning of “U.S. Aid.” Taiwan also received advice from United Nations Far East Handicrafts Advisory Committee, and in 1956, handicrafts expert, Mrs.E.Wills, was sent to Taiwan to provide guidance. The “Nantou District Handicrafts Research Group” was established in Caotun, Nantou, and the institution’s status was later elevated to that of a provincial institution, receiving the full support of the provincial government. This group became the present-day National Taiwan Craft Research and Development Institute. In terms of the revitalization of Taiwanese craft and the development of the rural economy, Yen was a key person who made significant contributions.

== Later life and retirement ==
Most of the paintings that Yen created in his later years feature Taiwanese indigenous subject matter. In addition, from 1961 onwards, he created a series of mosaic murals, such as the 1961 work Sports, which is on the outer wall of the sports stadium of the National Taiwan University of Sport, which was commissioned by Kwan Sung Sing(關頌聲). Among these works, the sunflower mural at the Tai Yeng Tang (太陽堂) store in Taichung attracted controversy, and was accused of having political undertones; the work was covered up with a wooden board by the artist himself, to alleviate suspicion of his “pro-communist” tendencies, and to prevent the work from being torn down. The work was finally revealed once again, 25 years later in 1989; this work was also one of Yen’s favorite mosaic pieces.

Besides creating large-scale murals to embellish the environment, Yen Shuei-long also participated in landscape planning, with his most notable work being the boulevard on Taipei City’s Dunhua North and South roads. In 1970, Yen was invited by Taipei Mayor, Henry Kao, to serve as a consultant for Taipei City, and there he became a major figure in shaping the aesthetics of Taipei. Yen’s proposal of creating Dunhua North Road and Renai Road as lush green boulevards, and the construction of the Renai Roundabout, was inspired by his experience of the Champs-Élysées in Paris during his youth, and at the beginning and end of this L-shaped road are now the Taipei Songshan Airport and the Presidential Office. This was designed in accordance with the expansion of Taipei Songshan Airport, and it enhanced Taipei’s role as the capital’s welcoming gateway. At the time, the project was criticized for wasting land, but time has proved that Yen’s vision was worthy. The road has been elected by citizens as the most beautiful road in Taipei City, and the lush trees lower the noise of the city and help with purifying the air, making it a popular place where many people go for both leisure and rest.

Yen also wrote My Endeavors in Promoting Taiwan’s Handicraft (1997), and Taiwan’s Handicraft and Me: My Experience and Vision Having Worked for 40 Years in Crafts (1978), both of which are accounts of his life’s work and are important texts on the development of Taiwan’s crafts. In 1984, Yen retired from his teaching post at Shih Chien College of Home Economics (present-day Shih Chien University) and dedicated most of his time to painting. He also held several retrospective exhibitions. In 1986, he was awarded the Special Contribution Award during the 11th National Award for Arts.

On September 24, 1997, Yen died at the age of 94 in Taichung Veterans General Hospital, following multiple organ failure. He is buried in his hometown, Tainan.

== Contributions to art ==
Aside from his advertisement designs, Yen Shui-long left behind many mosaic works. One of the most famous mosaics was his From Agricultural to Industrial Society at Jiantan Park, Taipei. His work Sunflower can also be found on the walls of the Taiyang Tang Bakery in Taichung. In addition, Yen accepted a commission to help with the beautification of Taipei City landmarks such as Zhongshan Hall and the façade of the Sun Yat-sen Memorial Hall, which set a precedent for Taiwanese public art and landscape design.

Yen made a series of mosaic art works after 1961. And he also created many art works that contain some motifs about Taiwanese aborigines. In 1984, Yen resigned from Shih Chien College of Home Economics (now Shih Chien University). In his old age, Yen worked mainly on painting, drawing, other visual arts and his personal exhibitions. He worked long hours to prepare for a 1997 retrospective meant to celebrate his 95th birthday. While working, he slipped and fell in a bathroom, resulting in a bone fracture that required surgery. Yen died of surgical complications before work for the planned exhibition was completed.
