= Tsai In-tang =

Tsai In-tang (Chinese: 蔡蔭棠, 1909–1998) was an artist born in Xinpu, Hsinchu, Taiwan, known for his paintings. He was born into a prominent family in the area.

== Early life and education ==
Tsai was born in the wealthy area of Xinpu Street (新埔庄街) in 1909. He was introduced to oil painting by his teacher, Nanjyo Hiroaki (南條博明), while attending Hsinchu State High School (新竹州立新竹中學校, now "National Hsinchu Senior High School").

After graduating from high school, he was admitted to Taipei High School (臺灣總督府臺北高等學校), where he received guidance from Shiotsuki Toho (塩月桃甫). After graduation, he studied at the Economics Department of Kyoto Imperial University (now "Kyoto University"). In 1935, he returned to his hometown after graduating from Kyoto Imperial University and began working while maintaining his interest in art.

== Career and contributions ==
In 1946, he became the director of teaching at Taiwan Provincial Hsinchu High School (臺灣省立新竹中學, now "National Hsinchu Senior High School") and frequently exchanged ideas with artist Chen Jin. In 1953, he was hired as the director of teaching affairs at Taipei Municipal Datong High School (臺北市立大同中學) and moved his family there. He began to establish relationships with local artists, especially art teachers at the school, such as Chang Wan-chuan, Wu Dong-tsai (吳棟材, 1910–1981), and Chen Te-wang (陳德旺, 1910–1984). During that time, he participated in the Taiwan Provincial Fine Arts Exhibition (臺灣省全省美術展覽會), the Taiyang Art Exhibition (臺陽美展), and the Taiwan Provincial Teachers' Art Exhibition (臺灣省全省教員美展). From 1955 to 1960, he and his friends founded the "Sunday Painting Association" (星期日畫會, which was later reorganized into the "Imagery Painting Association" (心象畫會) in 1965, and later renamed "Century Painting Association" (世紀畫會) and "Century Art Association" (世紀美術協會) through various reorganizations). In 1977, he moved from Taiwan to Fremont, California, US.

== Artistic style ==
Tsai In-tang employed watercolor, oil painting, and sketching as his primary creative media, exploring both abstract and representational themes. Throughout his artistic career, he continuously engaged in learning and observation, drawing inspiration from Western art movements such as Impressionism, Fauvism, and Cubism. Through peer exchanges, art society participation, and exhibition involvement, he expanded his experiences and artistic perspectives. In his works, Tsai aimed to showcase experimentation with painting elements like form, color, and lines. Scholar Lai Ming-chu (賴明珠) analyzed that in his later years, Tsai's style tended towards freedom, characterized by subjective use of color, flowing and unrestrained lines, vibrant hues, expressing the vitality of landscapes or figures.
