= Lee Shih-chiao =

Taiwanese artist (1908–1995)

- 李石樵
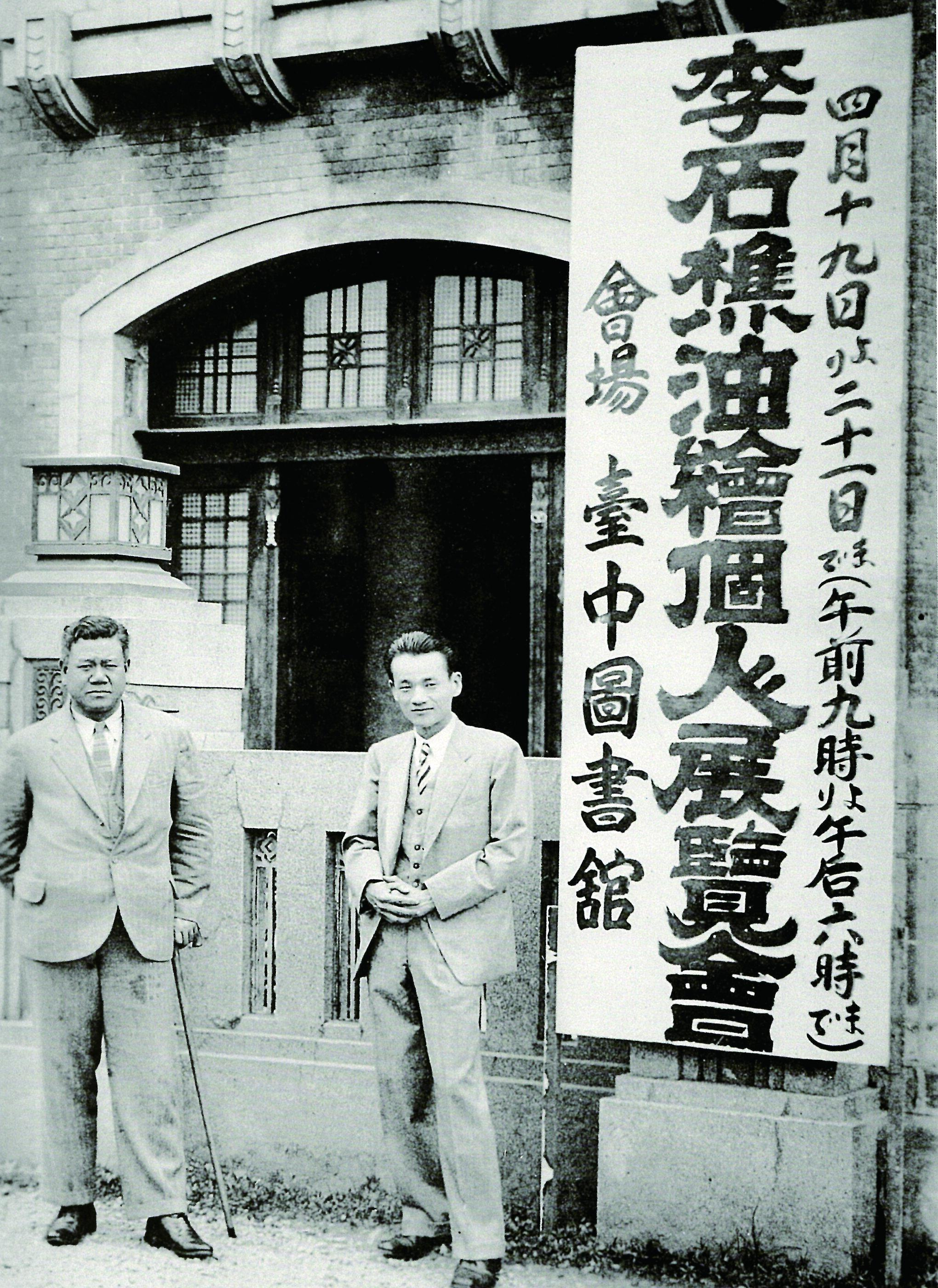
- Pronunciation: Li Shih-chiao
- Born: 13 July 1908; Shinshō, Taihoku Prefecture, Formosa, Empire of Japan
- Died: 7 July 1995 (aged 86); Syracuse, New York, U.S.
- Education: Tokyo School of Fine Arts
- Known for: Co-Founder of Tai-Yang Art Society 臺陽美術協會
- Notable work: Younger Brother (四弟像)
- Television: Is a character in La Grande Chaumiere Violette 紫色大稻埕 (2016 TV series)
- Movement: Realism
- Awards: Taipei Bridge was selected for the first Taiwan Art Exhibition (Taiten) (1927); First Taiwanese painter to receive review exemption status for the Shin Bunten Exhibition in Japan.

Lee Shih-chiao (Chinese: 李石樵; pinyin: Lǐ Shíqiáo; 13 July 1908 – 7 July 1995) was a Taiwanese painter. His art education and career began when Taiwan was under Japanese rule. Most of his paintings were realistic, but he also created some cubist works in his mid-life. He contributed significantly to art in Taiwan as an artist and educator. The Lee Shih-chiao Museum of Art was established in 1992, three years before his death.

== Early life ==
Lee Shih-chiao was a Taiwanese oil painter born in Shinshō (the present-day Xinzhuang Township, Taipei County) on 13 July 1908. Lee was the third of seven children born to his parents, who were farmers.

== Education ==
In 1923, he entered Taipei Normal School (台北師範學校), and began to receive formal art education under Ishikawa Kinichiro. Lee was also a student of Yoshimura Yoshimatsu. After the normal school was divided, Lee transferred to the Taipei Second Normal School. In 1927, his watercolor painting entitled Taipei Bridge was selected for the first Taiwan Art Exhibition (Taiten).

In 1929, he went to Japan seeking admission into the Western Painting Division (renamed Oil Painting Division in 1933) of the Tokyo School of Fine Arts in 1931; he was accepted after taking the entrance examinations three times, and began to study under Okada Saburōsuke. Lee graduated from the Tokyo School in 1935 and stayed in Japan until 1944.

== Work and public life ==
Lee married Chou Lai-fu (周來富) in 1928. In 1933, Lee's work Garden of Lin Benyuan was selected for the Imperial Art Exhibition (Teiten), and his Interior was selected for the 7th Taiwan Art Exhibition with special selection status and received the exhibition's Asahi Prize. In 1934, he co-founded the Tai-Yang Art Society alongside seven others: Chang Ching-fen, Chang Wan-chuan, Li Mei-shu, Liao Chi-chun, Tan Ting-pho, Yang San-lang, and Yen Shui-long.

After graduating in 1935, he remained in Tokyo and continued to develop his skills. During this period, he earned a living by painting portraits for wealthy and influential Taiwanese families. His 1936 work The Family of Yang Zhaojia is a representative work from this period in his life, and was selected for the first Shin Bunten Exhibition. In lieu of having been selected twice for Japan's official exhibition, Lee became the first Taiwanese painter to receive review exemption status for the Shin Bunten Exhibition. Another painting, Reclining Nude was considered pornographic and barred from the 1936 Taiyang Art Exhibition.

In 1944, Lee returned to settle in Taiwan. He painted Market Entrance in 1945. It was exhibited in the first Taiwan Provincial Art Exhibition held in 1946, where he also served as a juror. The painting depicted Yungle Market in Taipei and emphasized socioeconomic inequality in Taiwan shortly after the end of World War II. Lee considered Market Entrance among his best work. He continued painting scenes of daily life in Taiwan throughout the 1940s, including Happy Farmers. completed in 1946. In 1949, he used his family members as the models for his painting The Joy of Farming. This painting demonstrates the artist's adept handling of group images as well as his skillful use of realist style. In 1948, he opened a private art studio and began to teach art for free. In 1958, students that Lee had taught in his studio founded the Association of Taiwan Artists.

After 1950, Lee's style began to move away from realism, and he started using Picasso-esque techniques or reverse perspective in order to manifest the subjects of his works. In this period, Lee was particularly focused on Cubism. These changes can be seen in his works such as Still Life with Glass Vessel Metaphysical, and Painting Studio (Lily) (1958). In 1963, Lee began to teach arts at National Taiwan Normal University as an associate professor. He left NTNU in 1974, and became a professor of the National Taiwan Academy of Arts (now National Taiwan University of Arts) and Chinese Culture University.

Lee closed his studio, retired from art education and moved to Seattle to live with his daughter in 1982. The Lee Shih-chiao Museum of Art opened in Taipei on 11 July 1992. He died in Syracuse, New York, USA.

== Lee's former residence ==
At 15 years old, Lee Shih-chiao moved out of his house in Xinzhuang. The house was bought by a timber-factory-running family surnamed Huang. The Huang family built factories around the house and continued to maintain the residence. They did not know the house belonged to Lee Shih-chiao's family until they found his name in the land ownership certificate. Subsequently, the Huang family decided to register the house as a historical site to protect it from redevelopment.
