= Chen Chih-chi =

Taiwanese painter

- 陳植棋
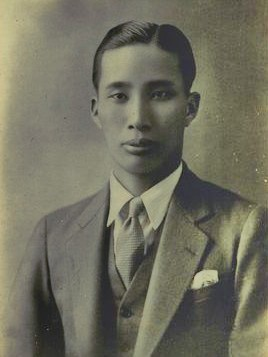
- Born: 16 January 1906; Hengke, Sui-teng-ka, Taihoku Chō, Japanese Taiwan (modern-day Xizhi District)
- Died: 13 April 1931 (aged 25); Taihoku-shi (modern-day Taipei)
- Education: Taipei Normal School; Hongo Painting Institute, Tokyo School of Fine Arts, Yoshimura Painting Studio
- Occupation: Painter
- Known for: Founder of Chi-Hsing Painting Society and Chidao Association
- Style: oil painting
- Awards: Tamsui Scenery selected for the 11th Imperial Art Exhibition
Chen Chih-chi
- Traditional Chinese: 陳植棋
Transcriptions
Southern Min
- Hokkien POJ: Tân Si̍t-kî

Chen Chih-chi (Chinese: 陳植棋; Wade–Giles: Ch'ên^{2} Chih^{2}-ch'i^{2}; Pe̍h-ōe-jī: Tân Si̍t-kî; 16 January 1906 – 13 April 1931) was a Taiwanese painter.

== Early life ==
Born and raised in Sui-teng-ka (modern-day Xizhi District, Taipei), Chen Chih-chi was bold by nature and had strong leadership skills.

He entered Taihoku Normal School in 1921 and, in 1924, he joined Kinichiro Ishikawa’s plein air field trips. Ishikawa's influence shaped his paintings. In November 1924, he was expelled from school after becoming involved in a student protest. On the suggestion of Ishikawa Kinichiro and Tōho Shiotsuki, he left Taiwan to study painting in Japan.

In February of 1925, he arrived in Tokyo and began studying at the Hongō Painting Institute before entering the Western Painting Division of the Tokyo School of Fine Arts. In addition to his formal classes, he studied at the Yoshimura Painting Studio, where Yoshimura Yoshimatsu influenced him.

== Work and public life ==
During his time studying in Tokyo, he remained concerned about the development of art communities in Taiwan and made frequent trips back and forth between Taiwan and Japan. Chen became an important founder of organizations like the “Chi-Hsing Painting Society” (七星畫壇) and the “Chidao Association” (赤島社). He was seen as both warm and generous towards others. Upcoming artists like Lee Shih-chiao, Hung Jui-lin, Chang Wan-chuan, and Chen De-wang all received his encouragement and went to Japan for further study. In order to gain recognition in art world, he put his talents and efforts to the task of continuously producing new works.

Between 1924 and 1931, when he died of illness, his works were selected twice for the Imperial Art Exhibition, three times for the Taiwan Art Exhibition, and three times with review exemption for the Taiwan Art Exhibition – extraordinary achievements for his brief, seven-year long career. In addition, there are records of his work having been exhibited in ten other large and small scale art exhibitions.

== Death ==
In April 1931, he died died of pleurisy, brought on by overwork and exhaustion, in Taihoku at the age of 26. In September of the same year, a posthumous exhibition of Chen’s works was held in his honor at the former building of Taiwan Governor-General's Office.

== Painting style ==
His works were primary oil paintings, and his themes included sceneries and landscapes, still lifes, and figures. His works were influenced by Post-Impressionism and Fauvism, but demonstrated a strong personal style through wild, vigorous brushwork and his bold use of color. His scenic paintings were devoted to illustrating the special characteristics of nature in Taiwan. Examples of such work include: Taiwan Landscape (Selected for the 9th Teiten in 1928) and Tamsui Landscape (selected for the 11th Teiten in 1930). A series of portrait paintings of his wife includes works such as: Fond of Peaches (Ai Tao) (1927), My Wife (1927), and The Wife (1930~1931). These works present courageous, firm, and persistent images of Taiwanese women.

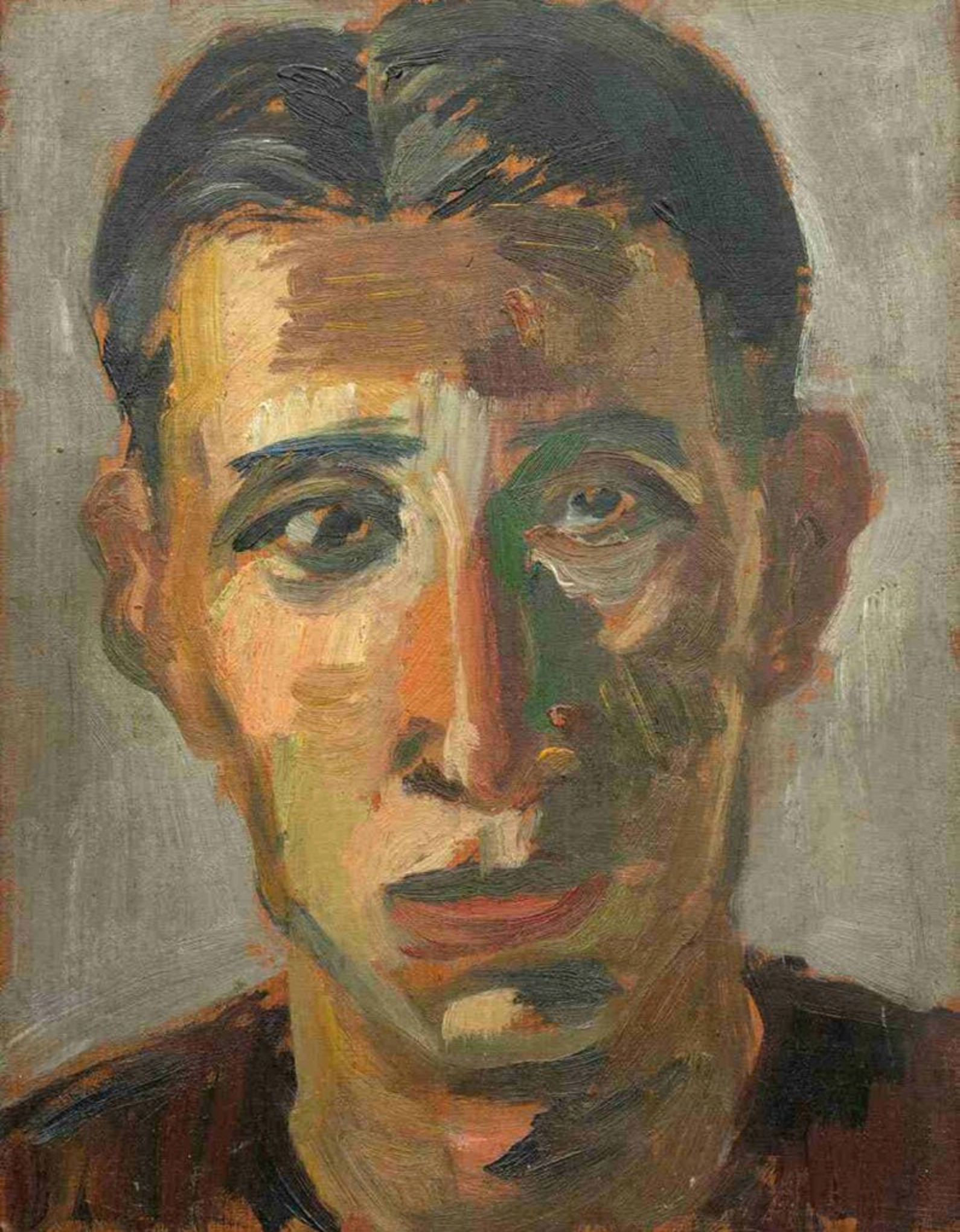

== See also ==
- Taiwanese art
