= Ho Te-Lai =

Taiwanese painter (1904–1986)

- 何德來
- Born: August 14, 1904; Tanbunko Village, Shinchiku Prefecture (now Tanwen Village, Zaoqiao, Miaoli County)
- Died: February 1, 1986 (aged 81); Tokyo
- Occupation: Painting
- Spouse: Kimura Hideko(木邑 秀子) (1931-1971)

In this Chinese name, the family name is Ho.

Ho Te-Lai or Ka Tokurai (Note: Romanization in Japanese, used because of his post-war career in Japan.) (Chinese: 何德來; pinyin:hē dé lái; August 14, 1904 – February 1, 1986) was a Taiwanese painter. He began his career during the Taiwan under Japanese rule his career in Japan after the Second World War.

== Life ==
=== Early life ===
Ho Te-Lai was born in Tanbunko Village, Shinchiku Prefecture (now Tanwen Village, Zaoqiao Township, Miaoli County). Because his biological father was unable to pay the rent, he was given to He Zhaiwu, a landlord of the He family, who owned a shop called "He Jinquan(Chinese:何锦泉)", as an adopted son by He Zhaiwu, and was renamed He Jingzhang. Because his adoptive parents attached great importance to education, he entered Jinhua Elementary School in Tokyo with the help of his friends and later transferred to Niushanchui Elementary School. After completing elementary school, he returned to Taiwan and entered Taichung Municipal Taichung First Senior High School in Taiwan. During this period, he came into contact with oil painting and developed a strong interest in developing art.

After graduating from Taichung Municipal Taichung First Senior High School in 1921, Ho Te-Lai went to Japan to take the entrance exam for the Western Painting Department of Tokyo University of the Arts, but he failed the entrance exam repeatedly. During the Great Kanto Earthquake, he met the family of Kenjiro Waki. After failing the entrance exam several times, he finally succeeded in 1927 and was admitted to Tokyo Fine Arts School. During his studies, he studied under Wada Eisaku. At the same time, he met other overseas students from Taiwan, such as Liao Chi-chun, Tan Teng-pho, Yen Shui-long, Zhang Shunqing, and Fan Hongjia, and together they founded the "Chiyang Western Painting Society". In 1929, he and other young and cutting-edge artists founded the "Akashima Society" and held its first exhibition in Taipei City. In addition, he fell in love with Hideko, the daughter of Kiyomi Kenjiro, and the two married at Nogi Shrine (Tokyo) in 1931.

In 1932, Ho Te-Lai returned to Taiwan from Kobe on the SS Dante Alighieri the "Hsinchu Art Research Society" with Lee Tze-fan, Gu Xiyi 谷喜一, and others, and participated in art organizations such as the "Hsinchu Watercolor Painting Society," "Yilu Society" and "Baiyang Society". With the assistance of advisors Nanjo Hiroaki and Arikawa Takeo, he often met to discuss painting theory and lived in Hsinchu for two years. During this period, he made important contributions to modern art education in Hsinchu. He also held the first "Hsinchu Art Research Association Exhibition" in his studio on Beimen Street.

However, at the end of 1934, Ho Te-Lai returned to Japan for treatment due to peptic ulcer disease problems. Before leaving Taiwan, he held the "Ho Te-Lai Farewell Exhibition" at the Hsinchu Public Hall.

=== Living in Japan ===
After settling in Japan, Ho Te-Lai often had to go back and forth to the hospital due to gastrointestinal diseases. As a result, he got to know the secretary position of the president of Nissan Construction Co., Ltd. He met Kaii Tokukan, the founder of the Japanese art group "New Structure Society". In 1942, he participated in the 16th exhibition of the "New Structure Society" for the first time and became a formal member in 1947 while also holding an important position. However, due to the impact of World War II, exchanges with the Taiwanese art world gradually ceased.

After the war, Ho Te-Lai and his wife continued to live in Meguro District, Tokyo. Ho Te-lai did not apply for Japanese citizenship. Since 1947, he has continued to participate in the Japanese public exhibition system as a member of the "New Structure Society" and continued to create paintings. He actively participated in exhibitions and published new works every year. However, he refused to participate in any commercial art activities. In 1956, Ho returned to Taiwan and held a solo exhibition at Taipei Zhongshan Hall. He also participated in a work exhibition organized by the Asuka Society and exhibited his works at the Shinbashi Asuka Gallery, Ginza Matsuzaki Gallery, and Nihonbashi Yanagiya Gallery.

In 1961, Ho Te-Lai was elected as an alternate member of the Japan Artists Federation and served as an alternate member for eight consecutive years. During this period, his status and reputation in the Japanese art world gradually improved. However, in 1970, his wife was hospitalized for a fever. Since then, he began to accompany his wife to the hospital and take care of her. In 1973, his wife died due to a worsening of her illness, which brought him a great blow. He used the painting "Back View" to express the last moments of his wife's life. In 1974, he published a quasi-autobiographical poetry collection, "My Road" (私の道), in memory of his wife. He also used painting and teaching to heal his pain and traveled to various places in the suburbs to sketch and create.

=== old age ===
In 1973, the Hsinchu Society held a solo oil painting exhibition of Ho Tak-lai at the Shibuya Gallery in memory of his late wife, Hideko. Ho Tak-lai established the Jiade Society to hold exhibitions regularly and promote art research among members.

In 1980, Ho Te-Lai won the first "Lin Weiyuan Memorial Dingjing Cultural and Art Award" in recognition of his contribution to the art world. However, his health began to deteriorate. In 1983, his right eye showed abnormalities, and he went to an eye hospital for treatment. During the 57th "New Structure Society" exhibition in 1985, he was hospitalized again for surgery because of cataracts in his left eye. However, the glaucoma in his right eye was not treated, and in the following days, his vision gradually deteriorated.

On the early morning of February 1, 1986, Ho Te-Lai died suddenly at his home in Meguro due to a heart attack. He was 81 years old.

In 1994, to commemorate his 90th birthday, the Taipei Fine Arts Museum held the "Ho Te-Lai 90th Anniversary Exhibition".

== Heritage ==
- Due to Ho Te-Lai's contribution to the New Structure Society, the New Structure Society established the "Katoku Award", which became the only award in the Japanese art group named after a Taiwanese painter.
- Most of Ho Te-Lai's works have been donated to the Taipei Fine Arts Museum and Hsinchu City Government by his nephew Ho Teng-jing. In 2018, the Taiwan Cultural Center of the Taipei Economic and Cultural Representative Office in Japan held a retrospective of Ho Te-Lai's works.
- In 2019, the Hsinchu City Cultural Bureau, Zhuxuan, Meiyuan, and Liuli Gallery held the "Ho Te-Lai and Japanese Art Groups - New Structure Society" exhibition, which included 121 works by members of the New Structure Society, artists and important disciples who exchanged with Ho Te-Lai during his stay in Japan, family collections and cultural bureau collections.
- In 2023, the Taipei Fine Arts Museum held the "My Way: Ho Te-Lai Retrospective" research exhibition, which displayed many of Ho Te-Lai's collections, archival documents preserved by his family, and other objects.

== Painting style ==
Ho Te-Lai's works are deeply influenced by modern art. He often uses monochrome, harmonious, and simple colors in his works. He mainly uses modern vocabulary, minimalism, and flat colors and lines to depict images of daily objects and present themes that reflect his inner changes. He also uses the environment as the starting point of his creative perspective, especially in the "Moonlit Night" series.

While studying at Tokyo Fine Arts School, his self-portraits and graduation works show the characteristics of academic art, especially in the rigorous training of human figure drawing. His graduation work, "Recollections of the Great Earthquake," further shows his concern for society. After experiencing the changes in his life, such as war and the worsening of his old illness in the 1940s, Ho Te-Lai's works more deeply depicted his criticism of social problems and his imagination of World peace, such as "Nightmare" (1950), "After the War" (1950), "Still Painting the Dream of Peace Today" (1951). In the 1950s, Ho Te-Lai continued to ponder issues such as the abiogenesis and expressed elements such as cosmology and astronomy. At the same time, themes such as memories of hometown and the image of mother began to appear. For example, works such as "Guqin Performance" (1949), "White Day" (1956), now in the collection of the National Taiwan Museum of Fine Arts), "Dawn" (1962), "Mother and Son Years" (1959) and "Dream of West Lake" (1952).

In addition to the visual imagery of images, Ho Te-Lai also relied on the font and meaning of words to integrate his feelings. His composition principle was not only influenced by Japanese calligraphy but also introduced poetry and words into painting, creating an art form that incorporates words and images. The most representative is the autobiographical work "Fifty-five Songs" (1964), created with words and pictures.
