= Taiwan Daily News =

Daily newspaper in Taiwan, 1898 to 1944

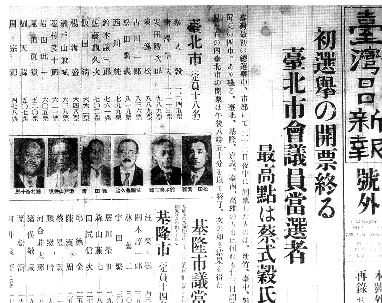
- Founded: May 6, 1898
- Ceased publication: April 1, 1944
- Language: Chinese; Japanese

The Taiwan Daily News (臺灣日日新報, Taiwan nichinichi shinpō) was a Taiwanese newspaper published during the Japanese colonial period in Taiwan. It was formed by a merger of the Taiwan News and the Taiwan Daily.

== Origin and evolution ==
=== Factional disputes and mergers ===
In 1896 (Meiji era 29), the Taiwan Daily newspaper was established and run by those who supported the Satsuma faction. Less than three weeks after its launch, it was used as the official newspaper of the Government-General of Taiwan.

Soon, the organizers of the Taiwan Daily News, which belonged to the Chōshū Domain, also wanted to get a piece of the pie at the behest of the second Government-General of Taiwan Katsura Tarō, so the newspaper owner negotiated terms with the Secretary-General of the Governor-General's Office. Later, Katsura Tarō resigned before the launch of the Taiwan Daily News. As a result, the Chōshū faction's Taiwan Daily News and the Satsuma faction's Taiwan Daily sang opposite tunes on policy, bringing the conflict between the feudal clans into the newspaper industry. Employees of the two newspapers even fought in the streets. Finally, the fourth Governor-General Kodama Gentarō intervened to mediate and ordered the Meiji oligarchy to buy the two newspapers and merge them into the "Taiwan Daily News", which ended the chaos. Afterward, with the support of the Government-General of Taiwan, the "Taiwan Daily News" became the largest newspaper during Taiwan under Japanese rule, including both Japanese and Chinese versions.

=== Development ===
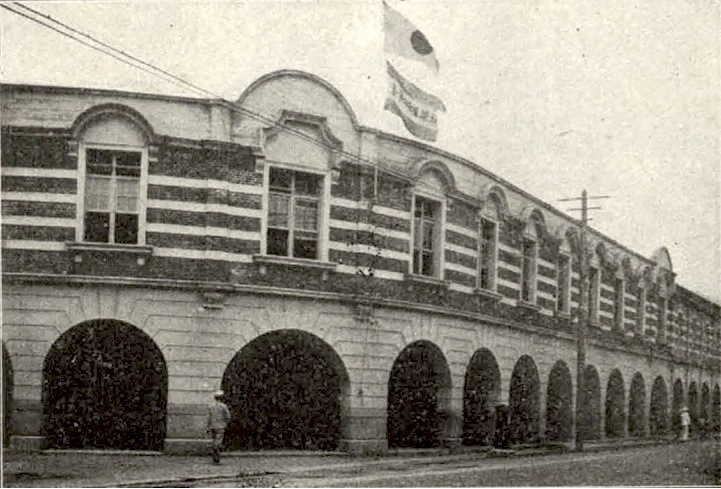
Taiwan Daily Newspaper

On May 6, 1898, the Taiwan Daily News began to be published and later became the newspaper with the largest circulation in Taiwan under Japanese rule. The newspaper also published Fubao, "Taipei News", and "Hsinchu News". In July 1905, the Chinese version of the newspaper was expanded, and the Chinese version of the Taiwan Daily News was independently published, which had six pages every day. In November 1911, the Chinese version of the Taiwan Daily News was abolished and the Japanese version was restored with two pages of Chinese version. It was not until April 1937 that the Chinese version was completely abolished. The peak circulation of the Taiwan Daily News was as high as 50,000 copies. At that time, Japanese working in Taiwan and police stationed in mountainous areas subscribed to the newspaper. Until April 1, 1944, when the Governor-General's Office merged the Taiwan Daily News into the Taiwan Daily News, the Taiwan Daily News was also the longest-running newspaper in Taiwan under Japanese rule.

== Multi-author serialized story ==
From February 24 to March 21, 1901 (Meiji era 34), the Taiwan Daily Newspaper imitated the experiments conducted by pre-war Japanese newspapers to increase newspaper sales. On February 24, the editorial department published the first chapter, entitled "Dark Road", and then invited readers to complete the content of the next chapter before noon the next day and send it to the editorial department. The reporters selected the winning content for the next chapter, and the collective creation relay was facilitated by soliciting manuscripts.

Each chapter of the novel was around 1,000 words (in Japanese), and a total of 10 chapters were published. To ensure that everyone who contributed received a prize, the winners, who had their chapters published, were different almost every day (only two authors were repeated); this led to inconsistencies in the content of the story. The editorial board announced the cessation of publication of the story on March 21, citing a lack of submissions.

== image ==
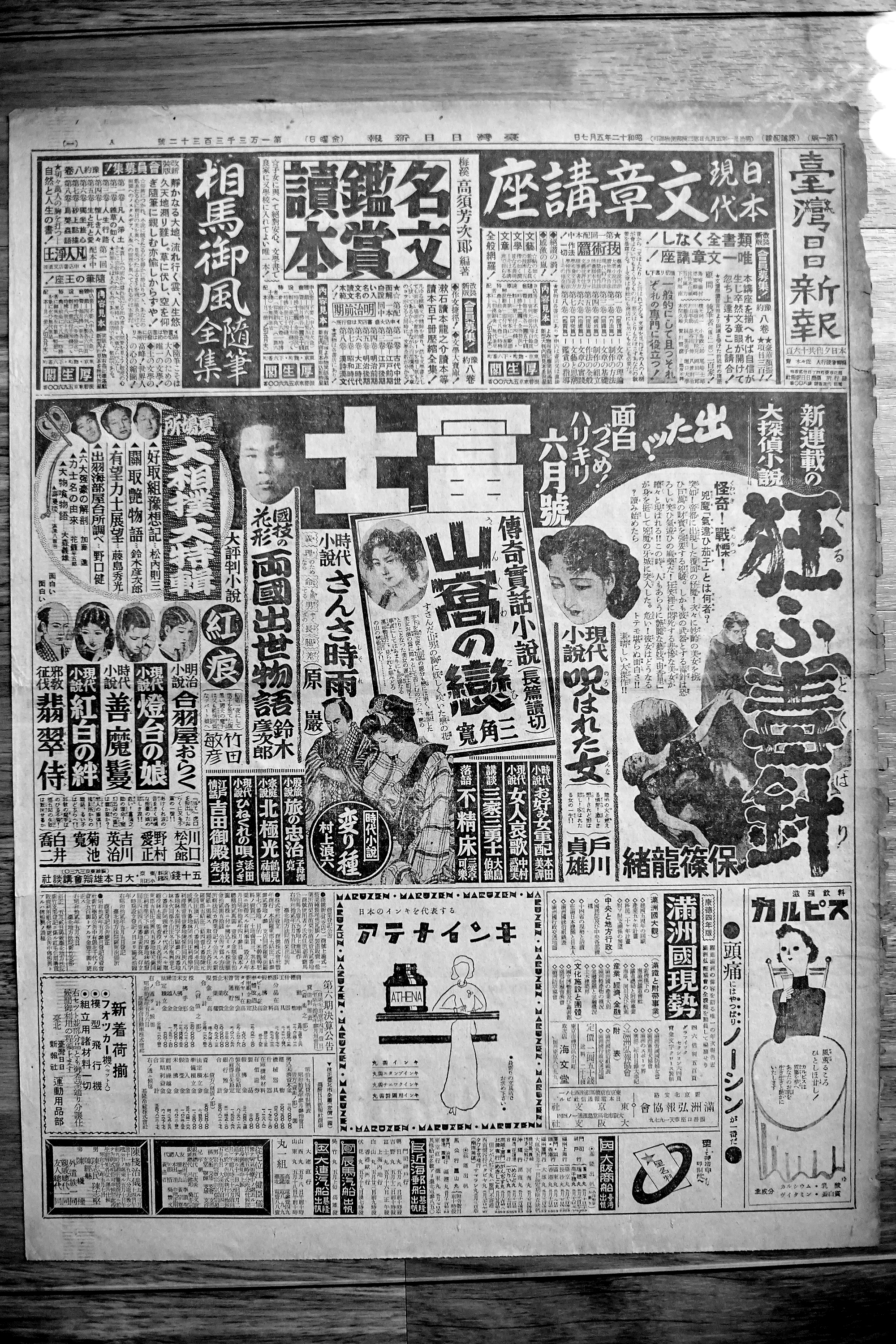

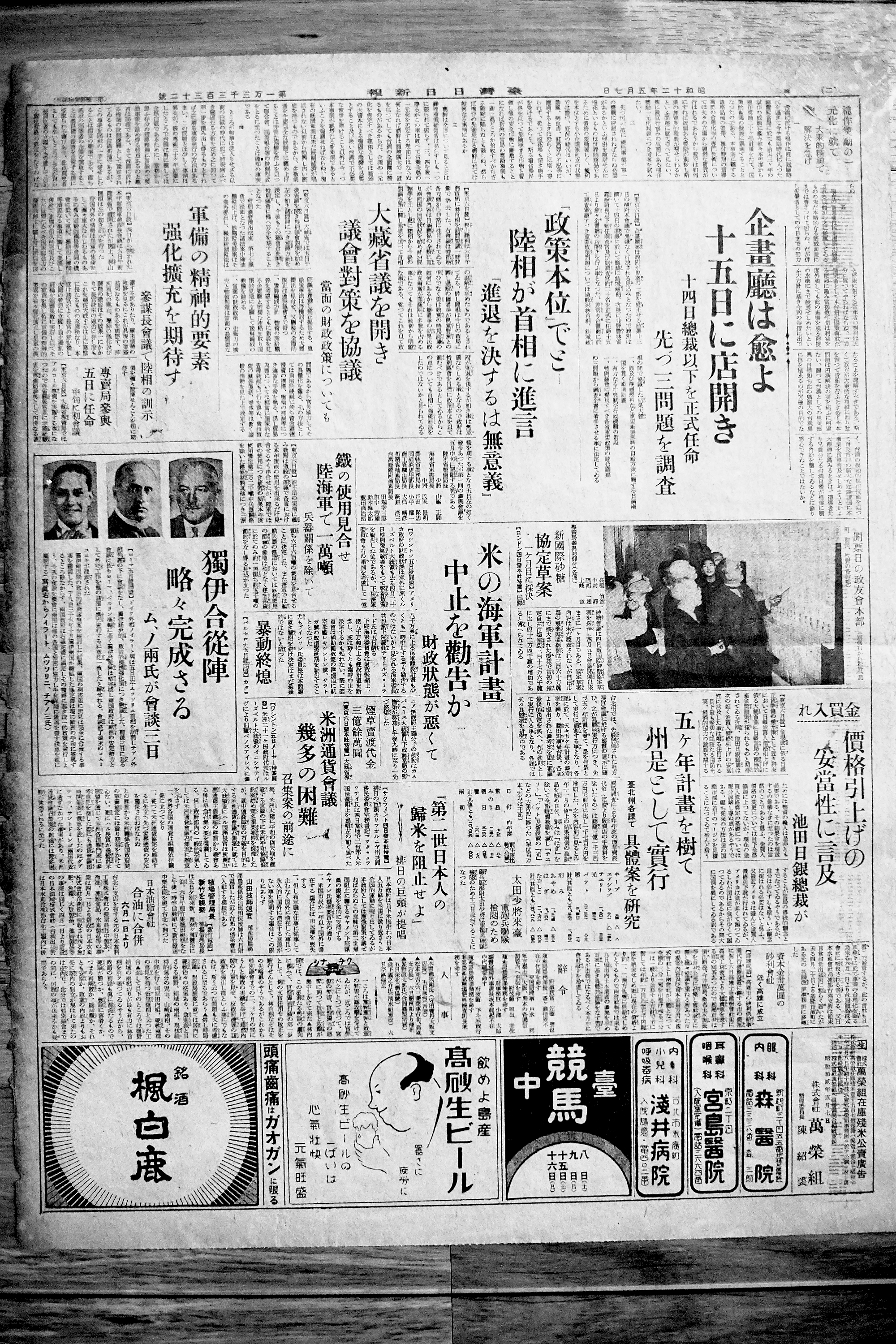

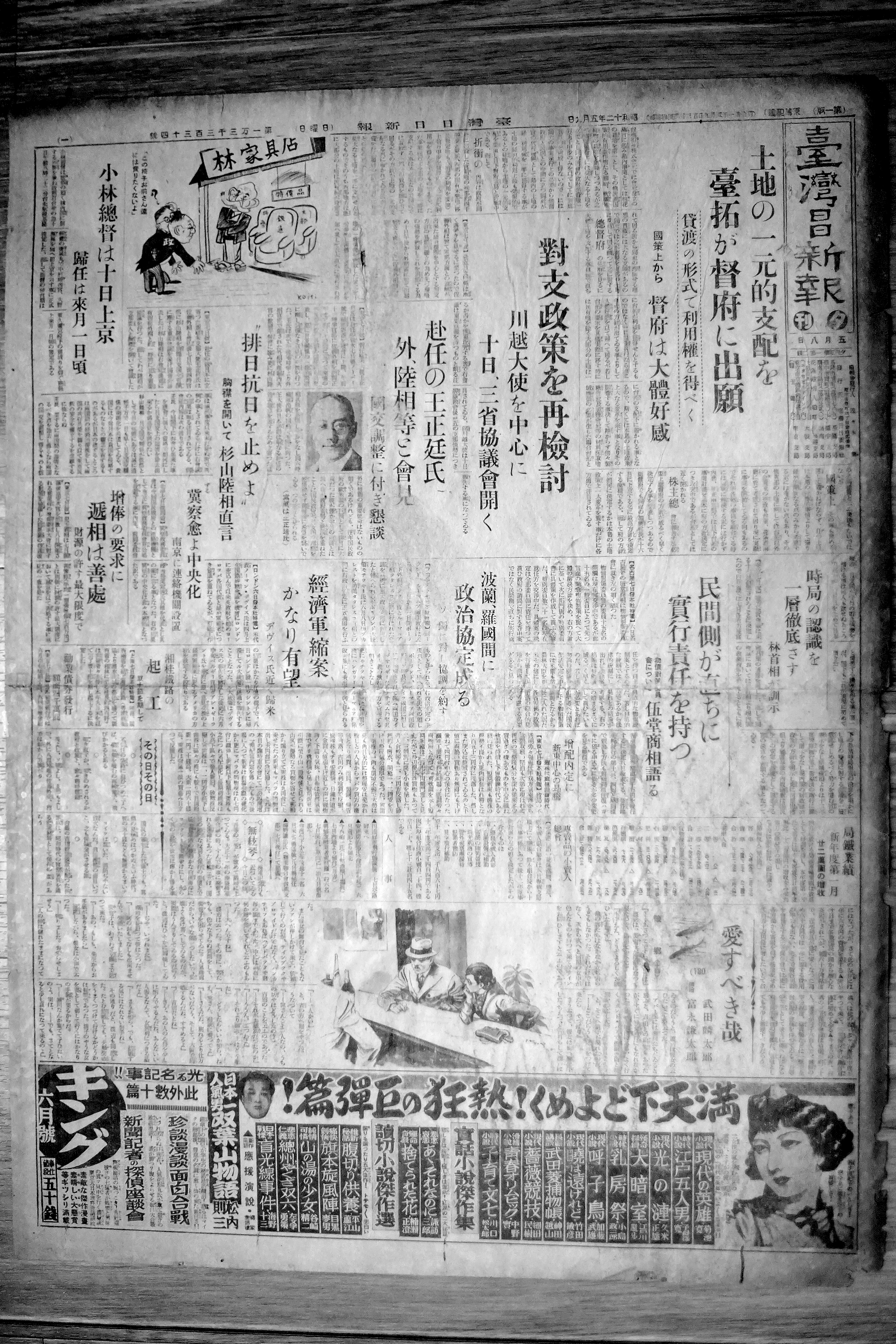

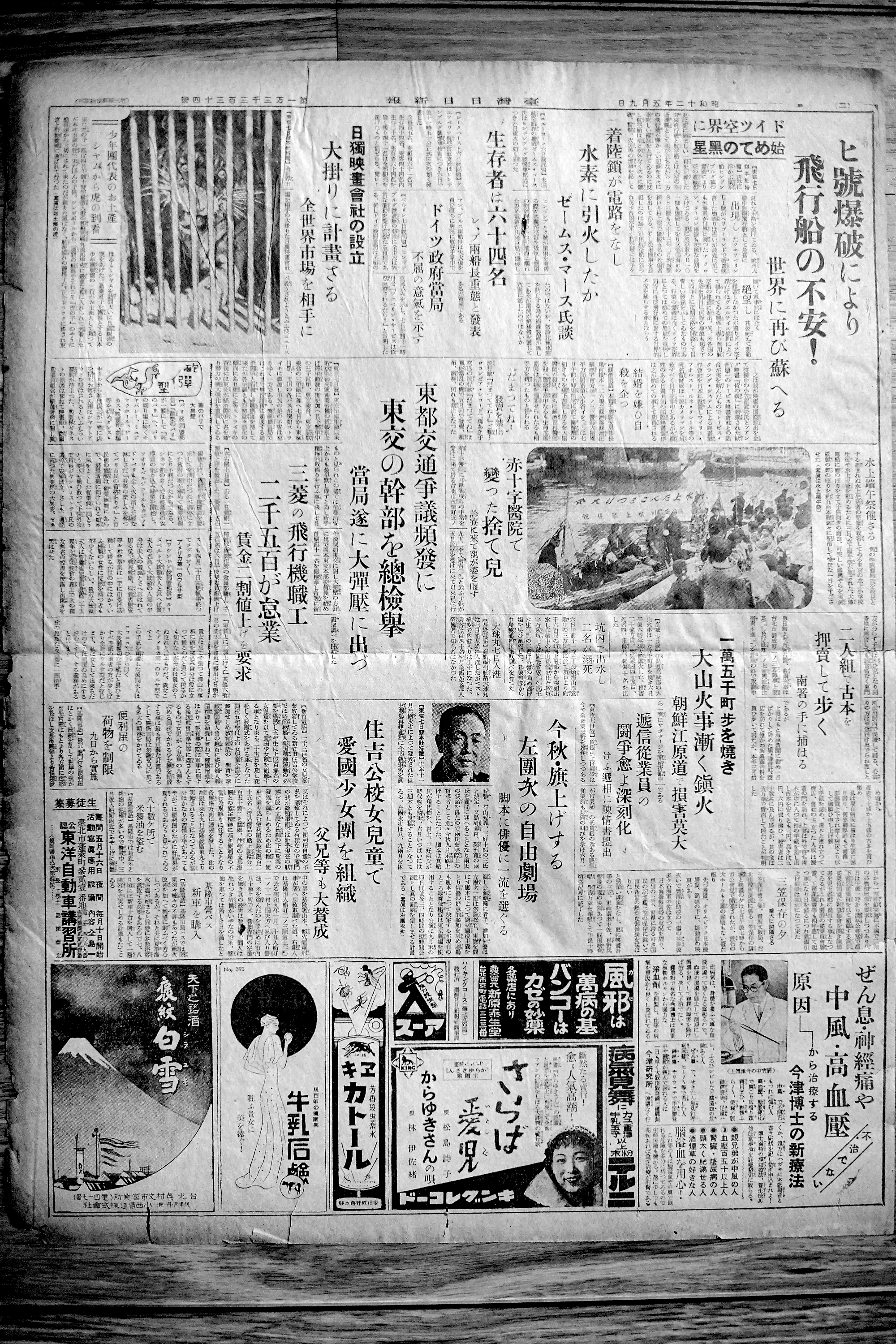
