= Kinichiro Ishikawa =

Japanese painter

Ishikawa Kinichiro
- 石川欽一郎
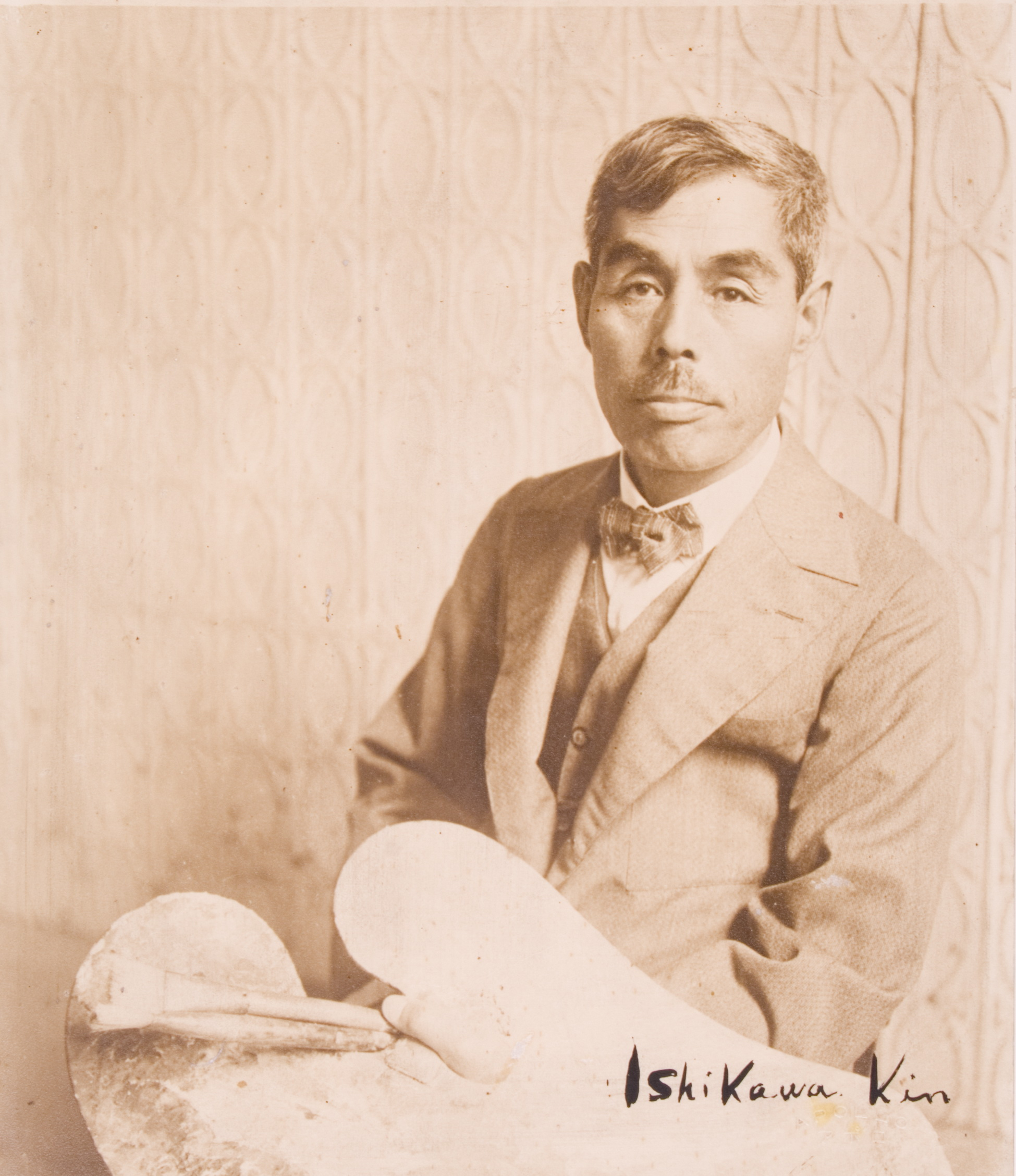
- Born: 8 August 1871; Shizuoka City, Japan
- Died: 10 September 1945 (aged 74)
- Education: Tokyo Telecommunications School of the Ministry of Communications
- Occupations: Watercolor Painter and Teacher
- Notable work: The Old Path at Toyohara (豐原舊道)
- Style: Watercolor
- Awards: Jiaoban Mountain Path, Xiamen, Riverside selected for the 1st Taiwan Art Exhibition; entered as works by juror

== Overview ==
Kinichiro Ishikawa (石川 欽一郎, Ishikawa Kin'ichirō; 8 August 1871 – 10 September 1945) was a Japanese watercolor painter, art educator, and writer. He is primarily recognized for his contributions to the development of modern Western-style art education in Taiwan during the Japanese colonial period and was considered a pioneer to art education. Through his teachings, publications, painting societies, and participation in art exhibitions, Ishikawa built opportunities for Taiwanese artists to study and exhibit Western-style painting. Some published paintings and articles he published are "The Latest Watercolor Painting Method", "Extracurricular Painting Posts", "Mountain Purple Water Ming" and directed the Seven Star Painting Society, the Taiwan Watercolor Painting Society, the Keelung Asian Painting Association, as well as school art workshops and courses for amateurs. Ishikawa advocated for the Taiwanese government to hold a sponsored art exhibition and founded the Taiwan Fine Arts Exhibition where he served as an examiner. This tradition has continued for more than eighty years and is regarded as a symbol of the important work and modernization of the government's culture and art sectors.

Kinichiro Ishikawa was also known for being a military interpreter who bravely fought against the Chinese (1900) and the Russians (1904-1905) in battles for the Japanese rule of Manchuria. In 1907 of October, he was made an interpreter for the colonial governor-general in Taiwan.

== Biography - Early Life and Education ==
Imperial Life Insurance Building in Taihoku by Kinichiro Ishikawa

Ishikawa Kinichiro was born on 8 August 1871, in Shizuoka, Japan. His father was a former shogunate retainer of the Tokugawa government during the bakumatsu (late Tokugawa Shogunate). In 1888, he entered the Tokyo Telecommunications School of the Ministry of Communications. where he was taught Western-style painting. His father did not approve of his passion for painting. In order to sustain his interest in painting, aside from using prints of English works to engage in self-study, he also studied Western paintings under Shoudai Tameshige. In 1889, he entered the Ministry of Finance’s Printing Department and joined the Meiji Fine Art Society. He traveled, with the English watercolor painter Alfred East (1849-1913) acting as his Japanese language translator, and this experience inspired his interest in watercolors.

From 1904 to 1905 he served as an interpreter for the imperial Japanese army during the boxer rebellion in China and after stationed in Manchuria during the Russo Japanese war. By 1906, he began to publish essays in the watercolor magazine "Mizue" (Water Painting). He began to teach watercolor painting in Taiwan in 1907.

== First period in Taiwan (1907 - 1916) ==
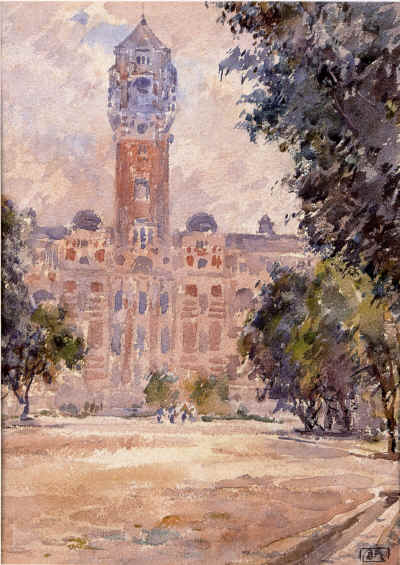
Government House, Taiwan (1916)

In 1907, he visited Taiwan for the first time as a military translator for the Taiwan Governor-General’s Office. From 1910 onwards, he served as an instructor at Taiwan Governor-General's National Language School’s Painting Division. In 1913, he organized other Japanese literati in Taiwan to form the Bancha Society (番茶會; a coffee meeting group) and promote cultural activities in Taiwan.

Ishikawa recognized the opportunities of Western-style painting in Taiwan were limited when it came to its studies. He then began to promote art education through teaching, public lectures, newspaper articles, and informal artistic gathers. In 1908 January 23-24 he published an essay Taiwan Nichinichi Shinpō also known as Taiwan Daily News discussing watercolor painting and the Taiwanese landscape, and introduced readers to plein air sketching and praised Taiwan's unique light and colors.

By 1916, he resigned his teaching position and returned to Japan to paint en plein air while traveling and hosting exhibitions. In 1922, he fulfilled a longstanding wish, traveling to Europe and painting en plein air at places like Paris, London, Rome and Venice. In 1923, his home in Kamakura was destroyed during the Great Kantō earthquake, indefinitely shutting down his art activities.

== Second period in Taiwan (1924-1932) ==
In 1924, at the invitation of Taipei Normal School’s Dean Shihota Syōkichi, Ishikawa returned to Taiwan to teach once again. He taught watercolor to students in Taipei. This most significant Taiwanese students included: Ni Chiang-huai (倪蔣懷), Chen Ying-sheng (陳英聲), Lan Yin-ting (藍蔭鼎), all major watercolorists and painters who later carried the torch of artistic communities, developing art traditions, and showed importance of artistic activities in Taiwan

He was involved in the creation of the Taiwan art exhibition (Tai-ten) first help in 1927, and served as a judge in its Western-style painting section. The exhibition provided Taiwanese artists with a public platform to display their work and gain reputation. He continued teaching and promoting Western-style art in Taiwan until his retirement in 1932, and then went back to Japan. During Ishikawa’s second sojourn in Taiwan, he actively promoted watercolor and fine art activities.

== Artistic style and Contributions to Art ==
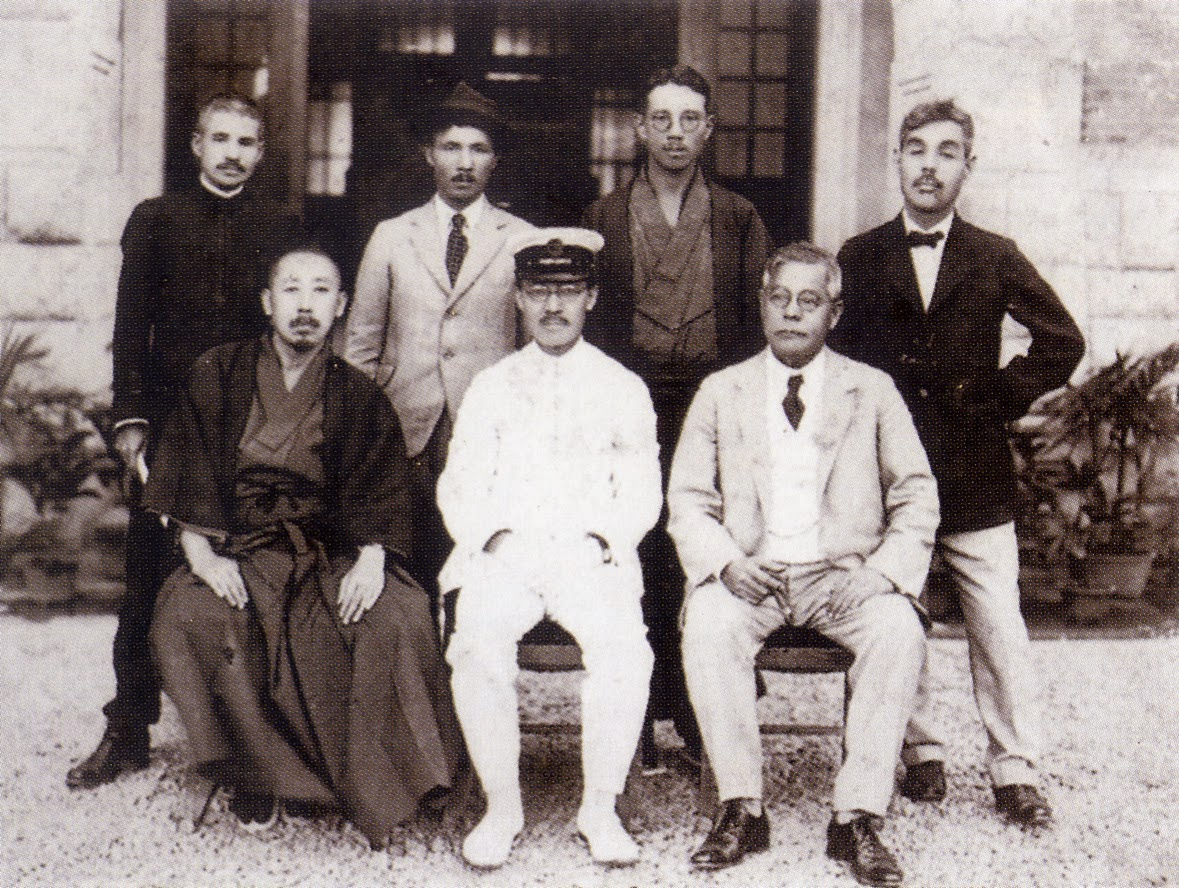
Examiners 2nd Taiwan Art Fair 1928 (Kinichiro Ishikawa top right)

Kinichiro Ishikawa often painted landscapes, streets, waterways, and rural scenery. His watercolor technique emphasized light, atmospheric effects, and clear but expressive brushwork. He combines British watercolor paintings with his own observation from Japanese and Taiwanese landscapes

Aside from teaching formal classes, he also organized and led en plein air painting field trips on holidays. He advised several art groups, such as the Chi-Hsing Painting Society, Taiwan Watercolor Painting Society, Keelung Asia Art Society, and Taiwan Painting Studio. In addition, along with other artists such as Tōho Shiotsuki and Gohara Koto, he participated in the planning and judging of the 1st Taiwan Art Exhibition (Taiten). He published articles and works in publications. He also published Scenic Beauties Collection and Extracurricular Painting Guides.

Water color on Silk by Kinchiro Ishikawa

His contributions to the promotion and development of Taiwan art education were held in high esteem. Students like Ni Chiang-huai, Huang Yi Bin, Lan Yinding, Li Chefan and Chen Zhiqi, received help and inspiration from Ishikawa. Ishikawa Kinichiro traveled throughout Taiwan to compose en plein air paintings and his works depict the natural scenery and historical monuments of the island. His brushwork was light and agile, colors were bright and appealing and he had a distinctive style of capturing pastoral scenes in a romantic, nostalgic atmosphere. Taiwan's Acacia, Zhantan trees (Melia azedarach) and old houses were often the subjects of his paintings.

Despite his achievements, Ishikawa also promoted cultural exchange to Japanese artists to get them interested in Chinese and Taiwanese art by hosting public exhibitions in 1914 of his own artwork, the first art exhibition is Taiwanese history which also planted Western watercolor painting and modern art education. During his travels to Japan and Travelled to Europe to paint outdoors (en plein air) and wrote about his encounters with other artists such as J.M.W Turner

== See also ==
- Taiwanese art
