= Hung Jui-lin =

Taiwanese artist (1912–1996)

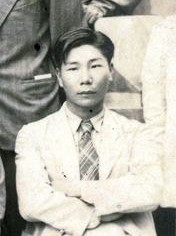
Hung Jui-lin

Hung Jui-lin (Âng Sūi-lîn, May 7, 1912 - December 3, 1996) was a Taiwanese artist from Taipei's Dadaocheng district. He is often referred to as the "Miner Painter" and is also hailed for bringing forth a "Radiance from the Depths of the Earth."

== Early life ==
Hung Jui-lin was born in Shiguan Lane (now Liangzhou Street) in Dadaocheng, Taipei in 1912. His father, Hong Hetin, was knowledgeable in Chinese studies and skilled in painting plum blossoms. He worked as a general manager at the Yuanlong Tea Company in 1923, and played a significant role in shaping Hung's artistic upbringing.

In 1920, Hung enrolled in the Daojiang Private Charity School school and was inspired by the school's principal Inagaki Tobei’s humanitarian spirit. This experience fueled Hung's later interest in caring for the underprivileged, impoverished, and laboring classes. During his time at the school, his teacher Wu Qinghai discovered Hung 's talent for art and ordered art magazines from Japan for him to read, broadening his artistic horizons and his concern for the general public.

In 1927, Hung entered the Western Painting Study Group (later renamed Taiwan Painting Research Institute) and was guided by Kinichiro Ishikawa. During his time at the institute, Hung met Ni Chiang-huai, Chen Zhiqi, and others. In 1930, Hung went to Japan to study abroad.

In 1930, Hong Rui-lin arrived in Japan and entered the Kawabata Painting School and Honcho Painting Research Institute to study art. The following year, he was admitted to the Western Painting Department of the Imperial Art School (now Musashino Art University). In the midst of the impact of European and American art movements, the art world in Japan at that time was also influenced by the "proletarian art" trend. Under the influence of various streams of thought, Hong Jui-lin's creative content started to focus even more on the daily lives of workers, farmers, and small-town residents.

== Mining painter ==
After graduating from the Imperial Art School, Hung Jui-Lin returned to Taiwan in 1938. To show gratitude for the support from Ni Chiang-huai to study in Japan, he accepted Ni's invitation to work at his mining company, the Hwai-shan Coal Mine (formerly known as Rui-Fang No.2 Mine), beginning a career in mining that would span over 30 years.

While working in the mine, Hung never forgot his passion for painting. He often brought small pieces of paper, ink stored in film canisters, and simple brushes into the dark, damp, and hot mine to quickly sketch scenes of the miners' work. He would later recreate these sketches on large canvases outside of the mine. Hung's paintings depict the miners' muscular bodies and movements with simple and rough black ink lines. The dark tones he used convey the gloomy and harsh environment of the mine and the miners' strenuous efforts. His series of works depicting scenes from the mines offer a direct and vivid portrayal of the laborers at their work.

Apart from miners, Hung also portrayed other socially marginalized and impoverished groups. He painted "Japanese Slums" in 1933 and "Yamagata Market" in 1937, both depicting the difficult lives of Japan's underprivileged people. Around 1936, Hung visited the Paiwan tribe in Pingtung, Taiwan, and had contact with the Yami (Tao) tribe in Taitung and Orchid Island. As a result, indigenous people were also frequent subjects of his paintings.

In 1972, Hung retired from the mining industry and moved to California, USA in 1980. He died due to a heart attack on December 3, 1996.

== Quotes ==
"It is my mission as an artist to portray the sacred work of miners in my paintings."

"My paintings are the diary of miners and my own reflection."

"During my years of studying in Japan, what moved me the most were not the cherry blossoms or the clear streams, but the laborers working in the cold weather."
