= Ran In-ting =

Taiwanese watercolour artist

- 藍蔭鼎
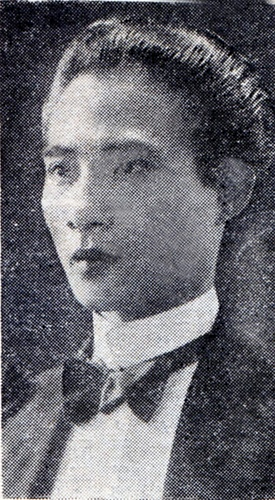
- in 1934
- Born: 1903; Taihoku, Taiwan, Empire of Japan
- Died: 1979 (aged 75–76)
- Occupation: Artist

Ran In-ting (Chinese: 藍蔭鼎; 1903–1979), also known as Lan Yinding, was a Taiwanese watercolour artist whose work is recognised around the world for its expressive rendition of Taiwan's landscape. He was able to capture the essence of his subjects with fluidity and sensibility, whether he was using watercolours or ink as his medium.

== Early life ==
Ran was born in Ratō, Giran-chō, Japanese Taiwan (modern-day Luodong, Yilan County) in north-eastern Taiwan in 1903. He is said to have painted his first picture at the age of 13, a mural on a temple wall in his home village of a dragon wreathed by cloud. His father, a xiucai scholar of Qing China, is said to have taught Ran Chinese ink painting as a child. He was able to study art at secondary school, and became an art teacher at Ratō Public School at the age of 17.

== Teaching ==
At this time, Taiwan was a colony of Japan, having been ceded to the Japanese by Qing dynasty China under the 1895 Treaty of Shimonoseki, at the end of the Sino-Japanese war. The Japanese were keen to modernise and develop their new colony of Taiwan, and renowned Japanese watercolour artist Kinichiro Ishikawa spent two periods totalling almost 18 years working and teaching art in Taiwan. In 1924, Ishikawa spotted Ran's watercolours at a school inspection, and was very taken with them. Ran then studied watercolour painting under Ishikawa's tutelage, taking the train to Taihoku (Taipei) at weekends to do so. Ishikawa had studied in England, and taught his students to paint in watercolours in the Western style, which was seen as very important in Japan at that time.

== Exhibitions ==
Ran successfully exhibited at the Imperial Fine Arts Academy exhibitions in Japan, the Teiten, in 1926 and 1929, and also in 1929, probably owing to Ishikawa's influence with the colonial administration, was appointed as Art teacher at Taihoku First Girls High School and Taihoku Second Girls High School. These were important appointments – these schools were generally reserved for privileged Japanese students in Taiwan, and had very few Taiwanese faculty members, let alone someone from a rural area who had only a secondary school education.

In the same year, 1929, Ran successfully exhibited in the Japanese Teiten exhibition, with his watercolour On the Street. He also exhibited in Taiwan and was active in furthering watercolour painting in Taiwan, being a founding member of the Taiwan Painting Research Institute for the study of Western painting, established in 1929. Ishikawa taught many students in Taiwan the art of Western style watercolour painting and he mentored and encouraged many Taiwanese students to travel to Japan for further training. Ran, however, stayed in Taiwan and continued to paint in watercolours and also in ink.

== Legacy ==
Ran's work has been exhibited throughout the world, and his paintings are in the collections of the major museums of the world including the Prado in Madrid and the Museum of Modern Art in New York. He was commissioned to paint works in the US and was a member of the major watercolour art societies in the UK, France and Italy. In 1959 he received the National Art Prize from the government of the Republic of China, and in 1969 received an honorary degree from the College of Chinese Culture (now Chinese Culture University) in Taipei. In 1991 the National Palace Museum in Taipei staged a major exhibition of Ran's watercolours, and in 1998 the National Museum of History held a retrospective exhibition of Ran In-ting's work, Hymn of Colors – The Art World of Ran In-ting.

Ran In-ting died in 1979, and is now considered one of Taiwan's most famous artists.

== See also ==
- Taiwanese art
