= Datong High School (Taipei) =

Coordinates: 25°03′18″N 121°32′07″E

Taipei Municipal Datong High School
- 臺北市立大同高級中學

Location
- No.167, Changchun Rd., Zhongshan Dist. Taipei City, 10485; Taiwan

Information
- School type: Public school
- Established: 1935
- Head of school: Chuang, Chih-Chun (莊智鈞)
- Grades: Senior 10 - 12; Junior 7 - 9
- Age range: Senior 16 - 18; Junior 13 - 15
- Enrollment: Senior 1,894; Junior 698
- Language: Standard Mandarin (Traditional Chinese)
- Classrooms: Senior 48; Junior 21
- Campus: Urban
- Website: www.ttsh.tp.edu.tw

Taipei Municipal Datong High School's Administration Building

Taipei Municipal Datong High School (DTHS in Hanyu Pinyin, originally TTSH in Wade-Giles: Taipei Municipal Ta Tung Senior High School, Traditional Chinese: 臺北市立大同高级中學) is a public senior high school in Taipei, Taiwan.

== History ==
Taipei Municipal Datong High School was established in 1935 as a combined junior and senior high school. In 1968, authorities implemented a nine-year compulsory education for Taiwan. This change made Datong a junior high school. Following the authorities' educational policy, in 1992, the system of the school was changed into a high school. The senior high school was added to the junior high school. Datong High School returned to its origins of 1935 and became the first complete high school in the country.

By order of the government, the school started evening sessions in 1953, which stopped enrolling new students in 1981. The evening sessions terminated two years later after the final students in the programme graduated.

== Surroundings ==
The area of DTHS is about 69,000 square meters. It is the largest campus of municipal high schools in Taipei City. The scheme of the campus blends Chinese traditional structure and Western European classical style. There are Long Chi (Dragon Pond), Feng Yuan (Phoenix Garden), Zhisheng Yuan (Confucius Garden), Zhicheng Yuan (Sincerity Garden), and Zhishan Yuan (Perfection Garden) on campus. Datong was praised as the best school building of Taiwan by the National Association of Architects in 1994.

== Notable alumni ==
- Lee Teng-hui (李登輝) - former President of Taiwan (1988 - 2000)
- Henry Lee (李昌鈺) - forensic scientist; Chief Emeritus for Scientific Services for the State of Connecticut, USA.

== Transportation ==
The school is accessible within walking distance north of Songjiang Nanjing Station of Taipei Metro.

== Gallery ==
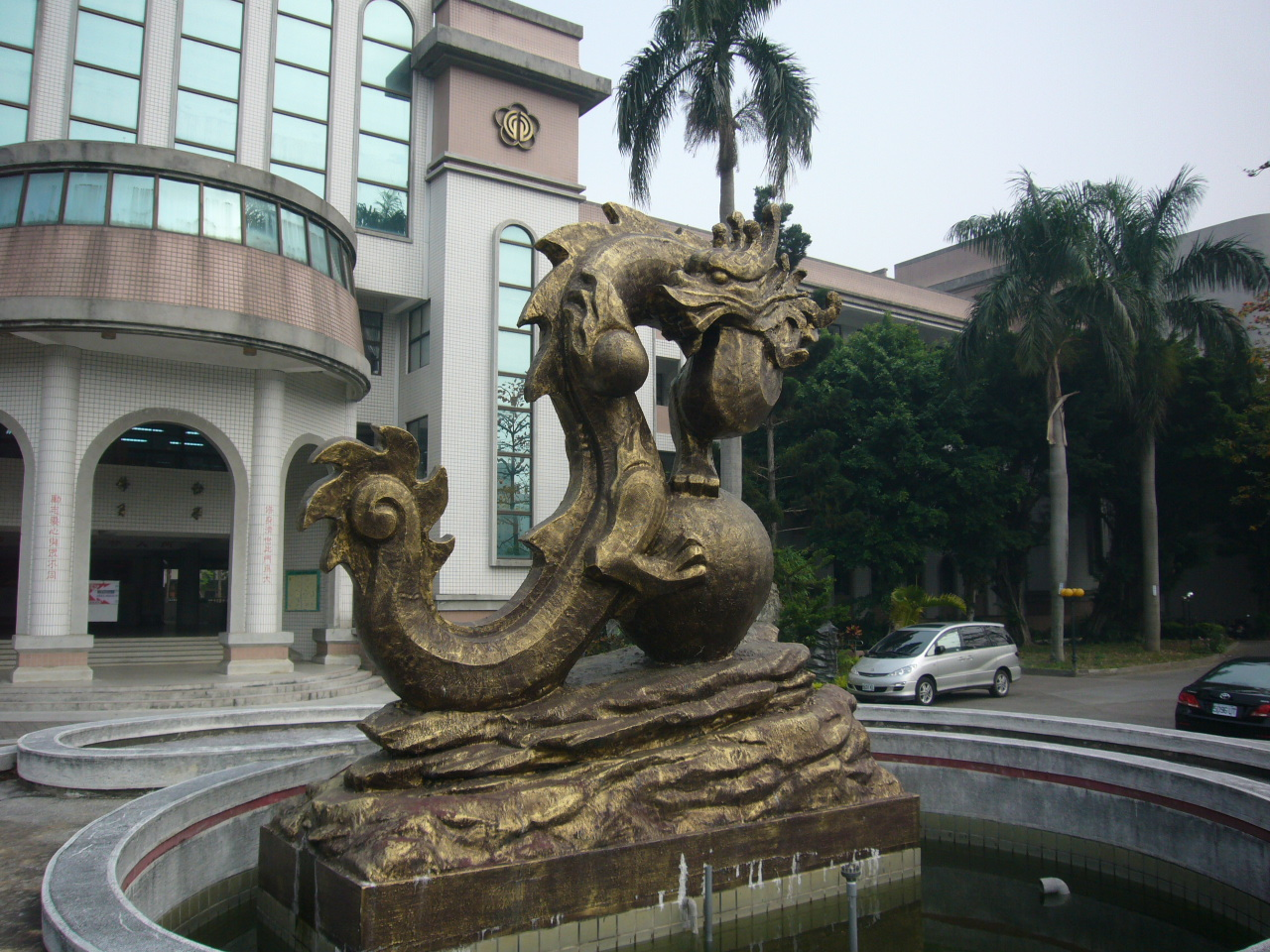
Long Chi (Dragon Pond)

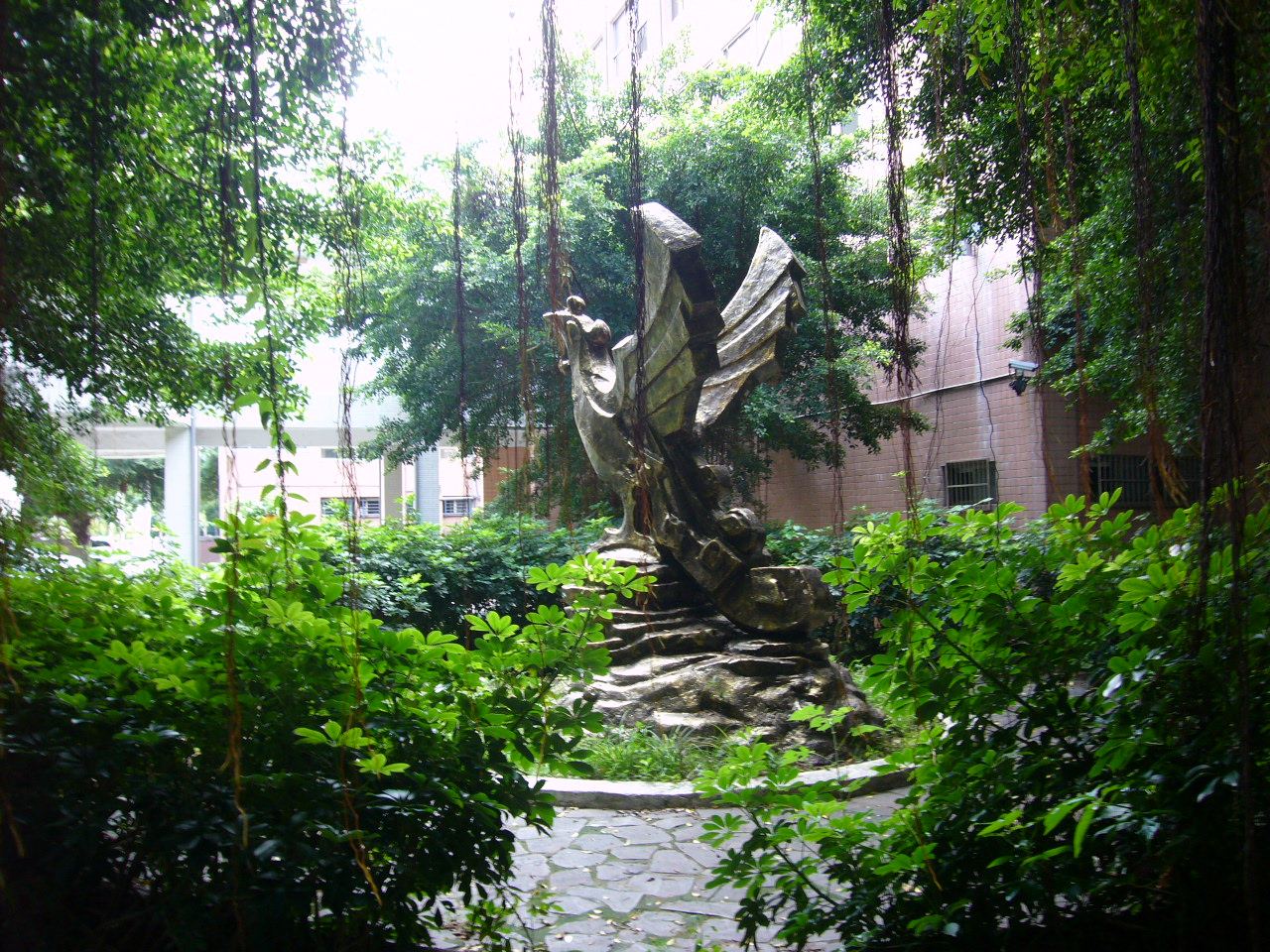
Feng Yuan (Phoenix Garden)

Zhisheng Yuan (Confucius Garden)

Zhicheng Yuan (Sincerity Garden)

Zhishan Yuan (Perfection Garden)

== See also ==
- Education in Taiwan
