= Chen De-wang =

Taiwanese artist (1910–1984)

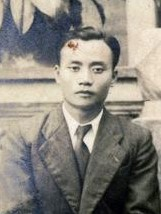
- Born: October 22, 1910 (Japan) Taipei, Taiwan under Japanese rule
- Died: December 3, 1984 (aged 74); Taipei, Taiwan
- Occupation: Painting

- Cheng Dewang
- Hàn-jī: 陳德旺
- Pe̍h-ōe-jī: Tân Tek-ōng
- Tâi-lô: Tân Tek-ōng

Chen De-wang (also known as Chen Te-wang; October 22, 1910 - December 3, 1984), a native of Taipei, Taiwan, was an artist during the Taiwan under Japanese rule in Taiwan and later worked as a teacher.

== Life ==
In 1925, Chen De-wang was a student of Japanese artist Tōho Shiotsuki while studying at Taipei First High School. He later went to study at Tongwen Academy in Tianjin, China, and returned to Taiwan in 1927 to study painting under Ishikawa Kinichirō. In 1930, he went to Tokyo, Japan for further studies and learned painting from Sōtarō Yasui. In 1938, he formed theAction Art Groupin Taipei, and his paintings focused on impressionism and applied art.

After World War II, he taught art in high schools and organized many art exhibitions, mainly to cultivate art talents. He died of illness in Taipei in 1984.
