= Yang San-lang =

Taiwanese painter

- 楊三郎
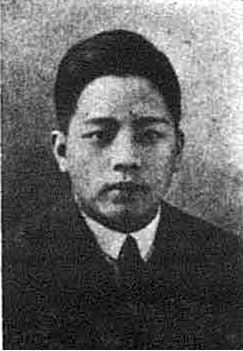
- Yang San-lang
- Born: 5 October 1907; Taihoku Chō, Japanese Taiwan (now Wangxi, Yonghe District, New Taipei City, Taiwan)
- Died: 6 May 1995 (aged 87)
- Education: Kyoto School of Arts and Crafts (Kyoto Kōtō Kōgei Gakkō)京都美術工藝學校; Kansai Arts Institute (Kansai Bijutsu-in) 關西美術學院
- Known for: Co-Founder of Tai-Yang Art Society 台陽美術協會
- Notable work: Mount Jade (玉山) (painting)
- Style: oil painting
- Awards: Easter Time selected for the 1st Taiwan Art Exhibition (Taiten)
Yang San-lang
- Traditional Chinese: 楊三郎
Transcriptions
Southern Min
- Hokkien POJ: Iûⁿ Sam-lôn
- Tâi-lô: Iûnn Sam-lông

Yang San-lang (Chinese: 楊三郎; pinyin: Yáng Sānláng; Pe̍h-ōe-jī: Iûⁿ Sam-lôn, 1907–1995) was a Taiwanese painter. His works, heavily influenced by the French Impressionists, shows a gently romantic and realistic personal style.

== Early life ==
Born in Wangxi, Taihoku Cho (today's Yonghe District, New Taipei City), on 5 October 1907, Yang grew up in an upper-class family. He came of age in Japanese Taiwan, and was originally known as Sasaburo Yo (楊佐三郎, Yo Sasaburo).

== Education ==
While he was attending Suehiro Elementary School (today's Taipei Fuxing Elementary School), Yang came across the works of Japanese artist Tōho Shiotsuki in the display window of the Kozuka stationery store on Boai Road. The incident inspired him to study painting and, in 1922, he sailed to Japan privately to pursue painting studies at the age of 16. After obtaining his parents' consent, he began his studies at the Kyoto School of Arts and Crafts (Kyoto Kōtō Kōgei Gakkō), transferring to the Western Painting Division of the Kansai Arts Institute (Kansai Bijutsu-in) in 1924. During this time he studied under Kuroda Shigetarō and Tanaka Zennosuke and specialized in oil painting.

== Work and public life ==
In 1927, his work Easter Time was selected for the 1st Taiwan Art Exhibition (Taiten) and acquired by Taiwan's Governor-General. After graduating and returning to Taiwan in 1929, his work Still Life was named a special selection for the 3rd Taiten and became the center of great attention in Taiwan's media and art worlds overnight. After failing to be accepted for 1931's Taiten, Yang's confidence was shaken and he decided to study abroad in France. In July 1932, he and Liu Chi-hsiang arrived in Marseille. His work Riverside of La Seine was selected by France's Salon d’Automne in October. Traveling in Europe, he was able to study and emulate the great works of museums and practice en plein air painting. It was during this time that he was able to assimilate the techniques of masters such as Jean-Baptiste Camille Corot (1796~1875), Gustave Courbet (1819~1877), and Maurice Utrillo (1883~1955), which led to a change in his style from dark and gloomy tones to bright and fresh colors.

== Artistic contributions ==
Yang returned to Taiwan in 1933. A true lover of art, Yang San-lang actively participated in several art organizations. While he was studying in Kyoto, he became a member of the Chidao Association founded by an elite group of Taiwanese artists. In 1934, the Tai-Yang Art Society was founded; Yang became an important leader in this group, and spared no effort in promoting art organizations and exhibitions. His works were selected several times for both the Taiwan Art Exhibition and the Viceroy Art Exhibition (Futen). In addition, he was accepted as a member of Japan's Shunyokai Society by recommendation in 1935. Yang San-lang devoted himself to the practice of en plein air throughout his life and his painted locations were throughout Taiwan, mainland China, Japan, Europe, and the United States. The primary subjects of his work were landscapes, still lifes, and figures. His artistic style was influenced by the Impressionist school, making use of symmetrical composition, bold and vigorous strokes, vivid and varied colors, and a rich array of textures. Yang painted into his 80s, traveling to Japan at the age of 85 to depict the mountains of Hakuba in the work Snowing Peaks-Hakuba, Japan.
