= Tōho Shiotsuki =

Japanese artist (1886–1954)

- 塩月桃甫
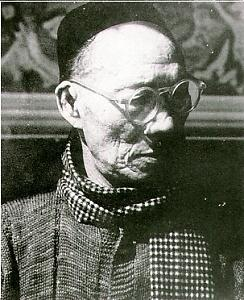
- Born: February 27, 1886; Miyazaki Prefecture, Japan
- Died: January 30, 1954 (aged 67)
- Education: Tokyo School of Fine Arts
- Occupation: Painter
- Style: Oil painting

Tōho Shiotsuki (塩月桃甫, Shiotsuki Tōho, February 27, 1886 – January 30, 1954), also known by his birth name Zenkichi Nagano, was a Japanese painter from Miyazaki. From 1921 to 1946, he taught art in Taiwan, and his surviving works and images depict and show a great deal of concern for Taiwan’s indigenous peoples.

== Early life and education ==
Shiotsuki was born in Sanzai, within what is now Saito, Miyazaki Prefecture, Japan, into a poor farming family. In 1908, he became the adopted son-in-law of Denjiro Shiotsuki and changed his name to Tōho Shiotsuki. He graduated from the Tokyo School of Fine Arts in 1912 and taught in Osaka and Matsuyama before adopting the name "Tōho".

== Career in Taiwan ==
In 1921, Shiotsuki arrived in Taiwan to teach art, first at Taihoku Higher School (now National Taiwan Normal University) and then at Taipei First High School (now Jian Guo Senior High School). Unlike other Japanese teachers who wore official uniforms and exuded an air of authority, Shiotsuki dressed in western-style suits and hats and even refused to wear official uniforms, setting himself apart and earning the nickname "Western beggar" from his students.

In his teaching, Shiotsuki emphasized “using one's brain” to create art, developing one's individual style, and emphasizing free thought and creativity. His artistic style was characterized by simple and bold lines, bright and daring colors, and a style reminiscent of Fauvism. During his time teaching art in Taiwan, Shiotsuki left behind many paintings depicting the scenery of Taiwan, with indigenous peoples being a common subject. This was likely due to his appreciation of primitive, pure, and natural landscapes. He was also the first painter to introduce oil painting techniques and materials to Taiwan, becoming a pioneer in the field of oil painting in Taiwan.

=== Taiwan Exhibition ===
In 1927, Shiotsuki collaborated with Kinichiro Ishikawa, Gobara Koto, and Seigai Kinoshita to establish the Taiwan Art Exhibition (commonly known as "Tai-ten"), and personally participated in the review of the exhibited works. His contributions had a profound impact on the later development of art in Taiwan.

In 1930, the Wushe Incident occurred, during which Japanese military police suppressed and persecuted the indigenous Seediq people with violent means such as poison gas. After the incident, Shiotsuki created a painting titled "Mother", depicting a mother wearing indigenous clothing with three frightened children by her side. "Mother" was exhibited at the sixth Taiwan Exhibition held in 1932. Through this painting, Tōho expressed his deep sorrow and sympathy for the indigenous people who were brutally killed, while silently expressing his accusations and opposition to the Japanese colonial government.

== Life after leaving Taiwan ==
After World War II ended in 1945, the Japanese in Taiwan were gradually repatriated to Japan. Shiotsuki returned to Miyazaki in March 1946. Due to luggage restrictions, he was unable to bring his works created in Taiwan back to Japan and he decided to leave these in Taiwan. Later, most of his works were lost due to various natural and man-made disasters.

After returning to Japan, Shiotsuki worked as a lecturer in several institutions and was involved in the design and illustration of books and novels. He also continued to create oil paintings. In October 1949, he held his first solo exhibition in Miyazaki after returning to Japan. In January 1954, Shiotsuki died from mitral valve disease at the age of 68.
