= Singapore English =

Variety of the English language

- Native to: Singapore
- Native speakers: Approx. 4 million (2020)
- Language family: Indo-European: Germanic; West Germanic; Ingvaeonic; Anglo-Frisian; Anglic; English; Southeast Asian English; Singapore English
- Early forms: Proto-Indo-European: Proto-Germanic; Proto-West Germanic; Proto-English; Old English; Middle English; Early Modern English; Modern English; 19th century British English
- Dialects: Colloquial Singapore English
- Writing system: Latin (English alphabet); Unified English Braille

Official status
- Official language in: Singapore

Language codes
- ISO 639-3: –
- Glottolog: sing1272
- IETF: en-SG

Speech example
A speaker of Singapore English reading aloud part of a Wikipedia article.

Singapore English (SgE, SE, en-SG) is the set of varieties of the English language native to Singapore. In Singapore, English is spoken in two main forms: Singapore Standard English, which is grammatically similar to British English, and Singapore Colloquial English—better known as Singlish—the colloquial register of English spoken between Singaporeans. Many Singaporeans use a combination of both forms in daily speech, and may switch between forms where necessary.

In 2020, nearly half of Singaporeans of Chinese descent reported English as their main language at home, while only a third spoke Mandarin. The remaining spoke various varieties of Chinese such as Hokkien, Cantonese or Teochew. Most Singaporeans of Indian descent speak either English or a South Asian language. Many Malay Singaporeans use Malay as the lingua franca among the ethnic groups of the Malay world, while Eurasians and other mixed-race Singaporeans are usually monolingual in English.

English is the medium of communication and instruction among students from preschool to university in Singapore. Many families use two or three languages on a regular basis, and English is often one of them. The level of fluency in English among residents in Singapore also varies greatly from person to person, depending on their educational background, but English in general is nevertheless understood, spoken and written as the main language throughout the country.

== Classification of Singapore English ==
Singapore English can be classified into Singapore Standard English (SSE) and Singapore Colloquial English (SCE), also known as Singlish. The language consists of three sociolects: acrolect, mesolect, and basilect. Standard Singapore English is regarded as both the acrolect and mesolect, while Singlish is regarded as the basilect.

- The acrolect does not exhibit substantial differences from Standard British English (SBE); however, there may be features of pronunciation indicating that the speaker is Singaporean, e.g. the use of a full vowel in unstressed syllables and a relatively monophthongal realisation of the FACE vowel.
- The mesolect exhibits grammatical features distinct from SBE:
  1. Question tenses in an indirect form; e.g. "May I ask where is the toilet?"
  2. Indefinite article deletion; e.g. "May I apply for car licence?" (Instead of saying "a" car licence)
  3. Lack of marking in verb forms (regularisation); e.g. "He always go to the shopping centre."
- The basilect (Singlish) exhibits the following grammatical features:
  1. Generalised "is it" question tag; e.g. "You coming today, is it?"
  2. Consistent copula deletion; e.g. "My handwriting no good lah."
  3. Use of particles like ah; lah, e.g. "Wait ah; hurry up lah, I need to go now!"

Singaporeans vary their language according to social situations (Pakir 1991) and attitudes that they want to convey (Poedjosoedarmo 1993). Better educated Singaporeans with a "higher" standard of English tend to speak "Standard" Singapore English (the acrolect), whereas those who are less-educated or whose first language is not English tend to speak Singlish (the basilect). Gupta (1994) said that most Singaporean speakers systematically alternate between colloquial and formal language depending on the formality of the situation.

== Standard Singapore English ==
Standard Singapore English, also called Singapore Standard English, is the standard form of English used in Singapore. It generally resembles British English and is often used in more formal settings such as the workplace or when communicating with people of higher authority such as teachers, bosses and government officials. Singapore English acts as the "bridge" among different ethnic groups in Singapore. Standard Singapore English retains British spelling and grammar.

=== History ===
The British established a trading post on the island of Singapore in 1819, and the population grew rapidly thereafter, attracting many immigrants from Chinese provinces and from India. The roots of Standard Singapore English derive from nearly a century and a half of British control. Its local character seems to have developed early in the English-medium schools of the 19th and early-20th centuries, where the teachers often came from India and Ceylon, as well as from various parts of Europe and from the United States of America. By 1900 Eurasians and other locals were employed as teachers. Apart from a period of Japanese occupation (1942–1945), Singapore remained a British colony until 1963, when it joined the Malaysian federation, but this proved a short-lived alliance, largely due to ethnic rivalries. Since its expulsion from the Federation in 1965, Singapore has operated as an independent city-state. English served as the administrative language of the British colonial government, and when Singapore gained self-government in 1959 and independence in 1965, the Singaporean government decided to keep English as the main language to maximise economic prosperity. The use of English as the nation's first language serves to bridge the gap between the diverse ethnic groups in Singapore; English operates as the lingua franca of the nation. The use of English as a global language for commerce, technology and science has also helped to expedite Singapore's development and integration into the global economy. Public schools use English as the main language of instruction, although students are also required to receive part of their instruction in their mother tongue; placement in such courses is based on ethnicity and not without controversy. The standard Singaporean accent used to be officially RP. However, in recent decades, a standard Singaporean accent, quite independent of any external standard, including RP, started to emerge. A 2003 study by the National Institute of Education in Singapore suggests that a standard Singaporean pronunciation is emerging and is on the cusp of being standardised. Singaporean accents can be said to be largely non-rhotic.

In 2023, opposition leader Pritam Singh advocated for English proficiency testing for immigrants seeking Singaporean citizenship. Polling data of native-born Singaporeans show broad support for the proposal.

=== Singapore's Speak Good English Movement ===
The wide use of Singlish led the government to launch the Speak Good English Movement in Singapore in 2000 in an attempt to replace Singlish with Standard English. This movement was made to show the need for Singaporeans to speak Standard English. Nowadays, all children in schools are being taught Standard English with one of the other official languages (Chinese, Malay, Tamil) being taught as a second language. In Singapore, English is a "working language" that serves the economy and development and is associated with the broader global community. Meanwhile, the rest are "mother tongues" that are associated with the country's culture. Speaking Standard English also helps Singaporeans communicate and express themselves in their everyday life. In 2014, the Singaporean government made an announcement entitled "Speak Good English Movement brings fun back to Grammar and good English", where the strategies that would be used to promote their program in the following years were explained. Specifically, the government would release a series of videos demystifying the difficulty and dullness of the grammatical rules of the English language. These videos provide a more humorous approach to learning basic grammar rules. Singaporeans will now be able to practise the grammatical rules in both written and spoken English thanks to a more interactive approach.

=== Malay, Indian, and Chinese influences ===
Although Standard Singapore English (SSE) is mainly influenced by British English and, recently, American English, there are other languages that also contribute to its use on a regular basis. The majority of Singaporeans speak more than one language, with many speaking three to four. Most Singaporean children are brought up bilingual. They are introduced to Malay, Chinese, Tamil, or Singapore Colloquial English (Singlish) as their native languages, depending on their families' ethnic backgrounds and/or socioeconomic status. They also acquire those languages from interacting with friends in school and other places. Naturally, the presence of other languages in Singapore has influenced Singapore English, something particularly apparent in Singlish.

Both Singapore English and Singapore colloquial English are used with multiple accents. Because Singaporeans speak different ethnic mother tongues, they exhibit ethnic-specific features in their speech such that their ethnicity can be readily identified from their speech alone. The strength of one's ethnic mother tongue-accented English accent depends on factors like formality and their language dominance. Words from Malay, Chinese, and Tamil are also borrowed, if not code-switched, into Singapore English. For example, the Malay words "makan" (to eat), "habis" (finished), and the Hokkien word "kiasu" (simplified Chinese: 惊输; traditional Chinese: 驚輸; Pe̍h-ōe-jī: kiaⁿ-su) are constantly used, having been adopted into the lexicon, to the point that Singaporeans are not necessarily aware of which language those words are from. The nativisation process has progressed so far that the word "kiasu" has been used in the Singapore press since 2000 without being italicised, and went onto claim international recognition, being admitted to the Oxford English Dictionary in 2007.

== Overview of Singaporean accents ==
Singaporean English accents are based on the sound systems of standard non-rhotic Southern British English accents, as is often the case with dialects of English spoken in Commonwealth nations aside from Canada. Like many of these dialects, the vowels in LOT [ɒ] and PALM [ä] are distinct in Singapore English (i.e., there is no father–bother merger), and the word plant is generally pronounced with the PALM vowel [ä], rather than the TRAP vowel [ɛ]. Broadly speaking, Singaporean and Malaysian English accents share a number of similarities, in terms of intonation, vowel realisation and non-rhoticity.

As English becomes more often used as a day-to-day language in Singapore, mass adoption of local norms have led to the formation of a standard, endonormative Singaporean accent with characteristics primarily driven by conventions and language change within the country. Nowadays, the accents of many Singaporeans reflect a compromise between local characteristics and standard language given that English has been institutionalised in the country for decades. Accents vary significantly, depending on age, upbringing and the race or heritage language of the speaker. Chinese, Malay and Indians have identifiable and distinctive ethnic accents that may be more or less pronounced depending on the speaker.

=== Rhoticity ===
Speech example
Lawrence Wong speaking on The Daily Ketchup Podcast, recorded c. January 2025. Wong's accent is non-rhotic, which is characteristic of Singapore English.

Speech example
Kumar, a Singaporean comedian and performer of Tamil descent, speaking on The Daily Ketchup Podcast, recorded c. July 2024.

Singapore English is predominantly non-rhotic, like Australian and Nigerian accents (and most postcolonial dialects of English), so most speakers will leave out the r sound in words like far. Though rare, studies suggest that final r sounds are more likely to be realised by younger speakers and women among Chinese and Indian Singaporeans, and that this tendency is more common in content words than in function words, and in reading than in conversation. Tan Ying Ying of the Nanyang Technological University says that the increased exposure to American media is a possible cause for the change, but Rebecca Starr of the National University of Singapore says that the reduced exposure to British English is a likelier cause.

Rhoticity is generally uncommon, and if adopted, seldom consistent, even in environments where a linking r could occur, e.g., my brother is and my sister is. In a 2018 study, r sounds were dropped at the end of syllables more than 90% of the time in conversational speech, while linking r was used less than 20% of the time. Cases of intrusive r (e.g., pronouncing drawing as draw-ring) were negligible. (Note: Semi-rhotic accents are quite commonly heard on radio, where some presenters have adopted more North American-like accents, though this is not representative of the ordinary local accent.)

=== Vowels ===
Monophthongs of Singapore English on a normalised formant chart, from Deterding (2007a:19). Here, /ɛ̝/ represents the NEXT vowel, and [ɔː] and [uː], in red, are allophones of /ɔː/ and /uː/ in open syllables. The vowels in FACE and GOAT are not included in this plot.

==== High vowels ====
- Singapore English accents are distinguished by relatively tenser realisations of the KIT vowel, which bring it closer to FLEECE in vowel space. In extreme cases, these vowels may have overlapping qualities, however several studies, including Deterding (2010:203–206) and Low (2025), demonstrate that a distinction in both duration and quality is still actively maintained by most people. Likewise, formant plots show significant overlap between the FOOT and GOOSE vowels, raising the possibility of a FOOT–GOOSE merger. (Note: Other studies report a robust distinction in vowel quality and duration.)
- While previous research has categorised /uː/ as a back vowel [u], more recent studies suggest that GOOSE-fronting is now prevalent among younger speakers, and that it is more accurate to classify this variant of /uː/ as a near-back [u̟] or centralised [ü] vowel.
- There is a tendency towards monophthongal pronunciations for FACE and GOAT, and this is especially true for Malay accents. Studies indicate that in general, these vowels are more diphthongal among Chinese Singaporeans.

==== DRESS–TRAP merger ====
- The vowels in DRESS /ɛ/ and TRAP /æ/ are seldom distinguished [ɛ] in conversational speech, meaning kettle and cattle, better and batter, and wreck and rack have identical pronunciations. Any distinction is less likely between words ending in stop consonants, like met and mat, though bed [e] and bad [ɛ] are kept distinct (see § Next–text split). Some studies report that /æ/ tends to be less centralised in vowel space despite the overlap, and that Malays are more likely than Indian and Chinese speakers to merge DRESS and TRAP in everyday speech. Low (2025) reports a vowel shift suggesting that the normalisation of the DRESS–TRAP merger is underway.

==== Next–text split ====
Frequency of NEXT-raising within the DRESS lexical set; out of all the words analysed, leg is most likely to be realised with the raised [e] vowel. For some of these words, like edge, raising is less consistent, and varies from speaker to speaker.

- For nearly all speakers, next and text do not rhyme, owing to a vowel split affecting the DRESS lexical set. The word next is realised with the raised vowel [e], which is distinguished from the low-mid vowel [ɛ] in text. The raised vowel [e] occurs unsystematically in a small subset of words including leg, dead and head (and their derivatives). Other words like fed and neck do not have this vowel. For many speakers, it is equivalent to the vowel in FACE, in which case dead rhymes with made, but not with fed. Taking this into account, speakers with the complete DRESS–TRAP merger will distinguish lag [ɛ] from leg [e], but not the words lad [ɛ] and led [ɛ]. Besides next, leg, dead and head, the raised vowel also occurs in egg, bed and red, making red [e] and read [ɛ] (as in I've read the book) non-homophones. The next–text split occurs in tandem with, and appears to be motivated by the DRESS–TRAP merger in the speech of younger Singaporeans. (Note: In a study comparing different age groups, younger speakers are more likely to raise the vowel in next, but raising is more prominent among older speakers. While words with the raised vowel tend to end in voiced stop consonants like /d/ and /ɡ/, this split is not phonologically conditioned, unlike /ɛɡ/ raising in Pacific Northwest English—given that leg /leɡ/ and beg /bɛɡ/ do not rhyme. Rather, the appearance of the NEXT vowel seems to be somewhat correlated with the commonness of the word in daily conversation.)

==== Low back vowels ====
Representation of vowel shift in Singapore English, showing the differences between older (grey) and younger speakers (black), from Low (2025). This study demonstrates that certain sound changes are becoming more common, like GOOSE-fronting, the merging of DRESS and TRAP into a single vowel, and the lowering of the low back vowels /ɒ, ɔ/. The study also documents a shift in which COMMA and NURSE are lowered, as well as the FACE vowel becoming more monophthongal.

- The LOT vowel is a rounded, low back vowel [ɒ̝˖]. The vowel in THOUGHT/COURT may be longer and closer to cardinal [ɔː] and this tendency is stronger before voiced consonants and in open syllables. Investigations by Deterding (2007a:14–17) show that speakers produce an allophone of the THOUGHT vowel that is higher and further back [ɔː] in words not closed by final consonants, like more and saw. The THOUGHT vowel is otherwise the same as LOT for many speakers, resulting in identical pronunciations for cot and caught [ɒ̝˖], though new research suggests that older English-educated speakers may still distinguish them.

==== Low central vowels ====
Low vowel correspondences in Singapore English
| Lexical set–phoneme correspondence | | Realisation | Words |
|---|---|---|---|
| THOUGHT, NORTH–FORCE | ɔ, ɒ | [ɔː] | law, more, gaudy |
| THOUGHT, NORTH–FORCE | ɔ, ɒ | [ɒ̽] | court, taught |
| LOT | ɒ | [ɒ̽] | stop, drop |
| STRUT | ʌ, ɑ | [ä~ɐ] | sun, month |
| START, PALM | ɑ | [äː~ä~ɐ] | dark, drama |
| BATH | ɑ | [äː~ä~ɐ] | ask, glance |
| TRAP | ɛ | [ɛ] | cat, relax, hand |
| DRESS | ɛ | [ɛ] | set, neck, men |
| DRESS | ɛ̝, eɪ (Note: It is still unclear whether the NEXT vowel is distinguishable from the FACE vowel.) (see § Next–text split) | [ɛ̝~e] | red, leg, head |
| SQUARE | ɛː, ɛ (Note: SQUARE is long [ɛː] in open syllables and may be short [ɛ] otherwise. Studies characterise SQUARE as a monophthong, in the neighbourhood of DRESS and TRAP.) | [ɛː~ɛ] | wear, scared |
† Footnotes

- For the vast majority of speakers, STRUT /ʌ/ and PALM /ɑ/ have identical or near-identical vowel qualities, in the vicinity of open central [ɐ~ä]. Sometimes, or in some environments, a length distinction is maintained. (Note: Like all free vowels, the PALM or START vowel is generally longer in open syllables, e.g. ramen [ˈɹäːmɛn] or marker [ˈmäːkə], than in closed ones, e.g. tart [tʰät̚]. The STRUT vowel, on the other hand, is always short.)
- Due to its retention from older Received Pronunciation, the TRAP–BATH split appears to be somewhat conservative in Singapore. Generally speaking, words from the BATH lexical set, like ask, last and half, are realised with the broad /ɑ/ vowel—the a in father—so ant and aunt do not sound the same. Usage of the broad /ɑ/ extends to plastic and elastic, while in contemporary Southern English accents a flat /æ/ would be expected.
- The flat /æ/ or TRAP vowel, on the other hand, has been reported to occur quite commonly in words that end in -sp, like gasp and clasp, and rarely, in dance and can't. In sample, command and demand, whether the broad or flat a is used varies from speaker to speaker.

Extent of the TRAP–BATH split in Singapore English
| Lexical set | Predominant realisation in | | | Words |
| Lexical set | Singapore | Southern England | Northern England | Words |
|---|---|---|---|---|
| TRAP | æ | | | bat, dash, hand, lapse, mass (science) |
| BATH | ɑ | | æ | ask, laugh, class, answer, example |
| BATH | ɑ | | | can't, half, rather |
| BATH | ɑ | (variable) | æ | graph |
| BATH | (variable, ɑ is more common) | (variable) | æ | trans- (e.g., transform), mass (church) |

==== Diphthongs ====
Diphthongs in Singapore English (Note: Excluding FACE, GOAT and SQUARE, which are analysed as monophthongs in much of the literature. PRICE and MOUTH have low central startpoints, and their trajectories end near the spaces of KIT and FOOT respectively. NEAR and POOR are alternatively realised as rising diphthongs beginning with glides [jəː wəː].)
Closing
| MOUTH | aʊ | out, how | PRICE | aɪ | find, pie |
| CHOICE | ɔɪ | loin, foil | PRICE | ɑ, aɪ | Before vocalised /l/: pile, aisle |
Centering
| POOR | ʊə~wəː | tour, sure | NEAR | ɪə~jəː | deer, pier |
| CURE | jɔː, jʊə | cure, endure | NEAR | ɪə~jəː | deer, pier |

- Deterding (2007b:26) notes that, while POOR, tour and sure are always realised with the diphthong [-ʊə] or [-wəː], most speakers will use the [ɔː] vowel in CURE, endure and security [-jɔː], though [-jʊə] and [-jəː] are also commonly observed. (Note: This distribution reverses the usual pattern in British English, where [ʊə] is more likely to be maintained after [-j-].)
- Words like fire [ˈfaɪ.ə] and hour [ˈaʊ.ə] are normally broken down into two syllables.

==== Vowel length ====
As in most varieties of English, free vowels are shorter when there is a following final consonant (i.e., in closed syllables), so bee [iː] has a long vowel while beat [i] has a relatively shorter one. (Note: Coda voiceless stop consonants are consistently associated with shortened vowel lengths, while coda fricatives like /θ/ prompt longer vowel durations.)

==== Variation in unstressed vowels ====
Some words ending in -a, like koala and umbrella, exhibit free variation between final /-ə/ and /-ɑ/ [-ä] in colloquial speech, while words ending in -er can only end in /-ə/.

=== Consonants ===
==== Pronunciation of ⟨th⟩ ====
Th-stopping is common at the start of syllables, making tree and three potential homophones; similarly, then can be pronounced [dɛn], in place of [ðɛn]. This is generally more common in informal settings. Dental fricatives may undergo th-fronting at the end of words, so teeth sounds like teef, and breathe like breve. The word maths [mɛts] is an exception, given that [t] is more commonly observed in this word. For some Tamil bilinguals, word-final th sounds are alternatively realised as stops.

==== Stop consonants ====
Stop consonants in Singapore English are usually not released at the end of words, and voiceless stops can be aspirated or unaspirated in initial positions—how strongly a stop is aspirated can be determined by its place of articulation, the heritage or home language of the speaker and the level of formality of the conversation. In general, speakers with strong Malay or Tamil accents are less likely to aspirate initial stops, while Chinese Singaporeans are more predisposed to using aspiration. (Note: Measurements of voice onset time indicate that, in initial positions, /k/ is more likely to be aspirated, or exhibit stronger aspiration [kʰ] across all major Singaporean racial groups, whereas /t, p/ are characterised by weaker and even weaker aspiration respectively. Out of all the language groups surveyed in the study, Tamil speakers of Singapore English have the lowest average voice onset time measurements for the word-initial lenis stops [b d ɡ].) (Note: Initial, unaspirated [p˭ t˭ t͡s˭ t͡ʃ˭ k˭] are found in loanwords from Hokkien and Malay, e.g. kopitiam [ˈk˭o.p˭i.t˭jäm]. Additionally, aspirated [pʰ tʰ t͡sʰ kʰ] also appear in Hokkien loanwords, alongside voiced stops.)

Final /p, t, k/ may show some degree of glottal reinforcement, final /t, k/ are also prone to being completely replaced by a glottal stop [ʔ] in fast speech. The use of glottalisation is more common in Malay-accented English. While it is not conventional to weaken t and d into alveolar taps [ɾ] in words like little and ladder, doing so may convey a higher level of sociolinguistic prestige. T-flapping has nevertheless been reported at higher incidences in compound numbers (e.g., in forty-five) and across word boundaries (e.g., get up).

==== Pronunciation of final "l" ====
Final "l" sounds, as in mail and railway, are categorised into three principal realisations in Singapore English—vocalised, clear and dark "l"s—with each variant showing strong correlations with race, language proficiency, education and social class within the sociolinguistic landscape of Singapore.

- L-vocalisation is common among Chinese Singaporeans, and is strongly associated with the older and middle-aged Chinese demographic.
- The use of clear "l"s [l] at the end of words is widely regarded as a hallmark of the stereotypical Malay accent, it sees the greatest incidence among Malay Singaporeans. Clear "l"s, however, also regularly occur in the speech of many Indian Singaporeans.
- Dark "l"s [ɫ] are not tied to any particular ethnic accent or identity, and they are more likely to be recognised as a "pan-Singaporean" feature, perhaps indicating a higher level of English proficiency.

Vocalised "l"s are realised as high back vowels [ɤ~ö] with varying degrees of rounding, e.g. mail [meö]. For speakers who vocalise their "l"s, the "l" sound can be dropped entirely after back vowels, (Note: Strictly speaking, after these vowels: FOOT, GOOSE, GOAT, THOUGHT and LOT.) diphthongs with back vowels (CHOICE, MOUTH), and sometimes mid central vowels (NURSE, COMMA), so that mole sounds like mow [moː], and tool like too [tuː]. Wall and war [wɔː] become homophones in the process. Moreover, the PRICE diphthong /aɪ/ is monophthongised into [äː] before a vocalised "l", so Nile and now are similar-sounding.

==== Final consonant cluster reduction ====
Certain final consonant clusters tend to be reduced in conversational speech, so list [lɪs] drops its final /t/ and ask [äs] loses the /k/, however speakers are seldom consistent in doing so. To give other examples—the clusters /-nt, -nd/, as in environment and end, are both reduced to /-n/, while the sequences /-mp, -kt, -ft/, as in jump, act and lift, drop their rightmost consonants.

The sequence /-ld/, as in old, is also commonly reduced to /-l/. Since those who vocalise their "l"s tend to drop them completely after mid central and back vowels, old may be further reduced to /oʊ/, with both the l and d dropped, e.g., old show becomes [ˈoʊ ˈʃoʊ] (see § Pronunciation of final "l"). This does not apply to the past tense ending -ed.

==== Pronunciation of r ====
The most common and predominant realisation of the r sound in Singapore English is the postalveolar approximant [ɹ̠], the same realisation found in most native varieties of English worldwide. The alveolar tap [ɾ] or trill [r] is an alternative realisation of r among Malay and Indian Singaporeans and older speakers in general. Among Tamil Singaporeans, the trilled variant appears to be extremely rare in comparison to the approximant and tapped r. A rare and emergent variant of r, indicative of R-labialisation and described as a labiodental approximant [ʋ], has also been reported.

==== Terminal devoicing and other irregularities ====
Some degree of final-obstruent devoicing has been reported to occur in Singapore English, though it is not a universal feature, and the extent of this may vary between speakers. What this means is that the s in a word like scissors may be devoiced as it is word-final, giving [ˈsɪzəs]. Devoicing seldom takes place between vowels, so is it? [ɪz ɪt] maintains the [z]. Newer studies dispute the idea that devoicing leads to ambiguity, and argue that underlying voicing is still recoverable from factors like the length of the consonant involved and the duration of the preceding vowel—pig [pɪˑʔ] may have a slightly longer vowel than pick [pɪʔ] for example.

Conversely, there is an opposite tendency to voice coronal fricatives between vowels in some words like December → De[z]ember /dɪˈzɛmbə/ and pressure → pre[zh]ure /ˈpɹɛʒə/, and even across word boundaries, so this is becomes thi[z] is, though this tendency seems to be somewhat sporadic, with regard to which words are affected.

=== Lexical incidence ===
Words generally follow the pronunciation patterns of Southern British English accents, so figure is pronounced FIG-ər, and the words new /njuː/ and due /djuː/ do not exhibit yod-dropping. Nonetheless, there are several exceptions—for one, want /wʌnt/ and what /wʌt/ both use the open central STRUT vowel, which is consistent with the English spoken in North America, but not in Southern England and Australia, where /ɒ/ would be expected.

- In colloquial, everyday speech, their is pronounced /djɑː/, making it distinct from there /dɛː/, which rhymes with mare.
- Flour is pronounced FLAR, and is clearly distinct from flower.
- Words like strawberry /ˈstɹɔːˌbɛɹi/ and raspberry /ˈɹæzˌbɛɹi/ conform to the North American pronunciation, as opposed to the British standard /ˈstɹɔːˌbɹi/. The same goes for zebra /ˈziːbɹə~ˈziːbɹɑ/, which is not typically pronounced */ˈzɛbɹə/.
- Seems and seen are sometimes realised with the lax i vowel found in words like KIT.
- Speakers are more likely to use the LOT vowel /ɒ/ for won (win in the past tense) than the STRUT vowel /ʌ/, so that it rhymes with con and no longer sounds like one.
- The mid central vowel [ə] has been noted as an irregular token replacing /ʌ/ [ä] in love, above and glove.
- Twelve is sometimes pronounced "chwelve".

=== Stress and intonation ===
Stress–tone relationship in SgE according to Ng (2011)
| Single phonological word | | Multiple phonological words | |
| example | pitch contour | example | pitch contour |
|---|---|---|---|
| rat | H (Note: L and H stand for lower and higher pitch respectively. M corresponds to mid level pitch, or a similar contour between low and high levels. Bolded letters correspond to where lexical stress falls in each word. Usually, words take on these pitch contours near or at the start of sentences and utterances. Elsewhere, pitch contours are flattened out.) | greenhouse | H–H |
| today | L–H | underneath | M–H–H |
| peanut | M–H | unimpressed | H–L–H |
| creative | L–M–H | watermelon | M–H–M–H |
| minimum | M–M–H | anticlockwise | M–H–H–H |

Pitch contour of a declarative sentence in Singapore English, from Chong (2012). Here, aL and Ha mark the left and right edges of an accentual phrase, and L* is a pitch accent falling on stressed syllables. The gradual downwards movement of pitch towards the end of the sentence is represented by the boundary tone L%.

Singapore English is characterised by a unique intonational system where pitch tends to be slightly raised at the end of a word with lexical stress. According to one analysis, the rightmost syllable of a stressed word or phonological word is marked with higher pitch, while words with no stress (e.g. my house) and unstressed initial syllables (e.g. again) carry relatively lower pitch. Meanwhile, all other non-final stressed syllables (e.g. writer) coincide with a mid level tone, or a similar pitch contour between low and high levels. There is also a tendency for pitch contours to be accentuated near the start of a sentence and diminished towards the end, and for pitch to drop or level out at the end of declarative sentences. For example, in the phrase I don't remember [aɪ˨ ˈdon˦ ɹɪ˨ˈmɛm˧.bə˦], pitch starts off low in I, then rises to a higher level in don't. The word remember is then realised with a less accentuated low–mid–high pitch contour.

Tone assignment only takes place within the scope of the phonological word. Cranberry takes on a high–mid–high pitch contour [ˈkɹɛn˦ˌbɛ˧.ɹi˦], since cran and berry are analysed as separate words. Similarly, in brainstorm [ˈbɹeɪn˦ˌstɔːm˦], brain and storm are both assigned high pitch. Prefixes with stress constitute their own phonological words, so the re in reenact [ˈɹi˦.ɛn˨ˌɛkt˦] is high-pitched. In words where the prefix is unstressed or less salient, like unfortunate [an˨ˈfɔ˧.tʃə˧.nət˦] and nonsense [ˈnɔn˧.səns˦], the prefix is not treated as a separate unit with stress and is therefore not assigned high pitch.

One alternative analysis, that offers a more generalised description of the intonational system, posits that high pitch is associated with the right edge of an accentual phrase, and low pitch with the left edge; an accentual phrase may consist of a content word with zero or any number of preceding unstressed function words. For instance, in a sentence like I joined the call, in which I joined is analysed as a single accentual phrase, joined can be realised with rising pitch starting from the low pitch in I, in lieu of consistently high pitch. In this model, phonological words (e.g. cran and berry in cranberry) and prefixes with stress are analysed as belonging to separate accentual phrases. Other intonational variants have also been noted. For instance, flat pitch contours can sometimes span the entire length of words and accentual phrases where rising contours would normally be expected.

Wider pitch range is associated with the introduction of a topic near the start of a sentence. Elsewhere in the sentence, differences in pitch are less prominent, so low, mid and high tones may collapse into roughly the same pitch level. The end of a sentence is marked by a subtle drop or levelling out in pitch. Yes–no questions are accompanied with rising pitch, as is the case in many other dialects of English. Rising pitch is also commonly used when there is non-final information at the end of an utterance, sometimes to indicate a non-final item in a list.

==== Timing ====
Unstressed initial syllables are often realised with shorter duration and lower intensity. There is also a tendency for the last syllable in an utterance to be lengthened or dragged out.

Singapore English tends towards syllable timing, unlike British English, which is considered stress-timed.

== Spelling and vocabulary ==
20th-century British English had had significant influence over the development of what is now called Singapore English, and there is still a tendency for some older Singaporeans to use expressions that would be considered old-fashioned in London today. In everyday speech, some words are more ubiquitous in Singapore English, like scold—in the UK, tell off is the more natural expression and scold may be regarded as somewhat formal or dated. Still, much of Singapore English vocabulary parallels that of the English spoken in Southern England and other Commonwealth nations—barring some exceptions. Standard Singapore English follows British spelling conventions (e.g., colour and realise, as opposed to color and realize).

Some words unique to Singapore English are lexical innovations, often compound words (e.g., void deck), while some words have taken on completely different meanings—for instance, keep is often used with the meaning of "put away" or "put (something) back", rather than "hold on to something".

Examples of words unique to, or with different meanings in Singapore English
| Word in Singapore English | Notes |
|---|---|
| freethinker | Someone with no religion; not necessarily an atheist in the strict sense. |
| gantry | A faregate or turnstile. |
| heartlands | Refers to the suburban, residential districts in Singapore outside of the city centre, i.e., the new towns of Singapore. |
| Mdm | Abbreviation of Madam, a polite title and form of address for some adult women, usually reserved for the middle-aged or elderly, e.g. Mdm Lee, Mdm Rajaratnam. |
| tuition | Private classes taken outside of school. Equivalent to tutoring in other countries. |
Food
| brinjal | Equivalent to eggplant (AmE) or aubergine (BrE). Brinjal is also common in Malaysian, South Asian and South African English. |
| carrot cake | An ambiguous term, carrot cake can refer to three completely different things in Singapore: 1. Turnip cake, a Cantonese dim sum dish.; 2. Chai tow kway, a Teochew variant of the previous dish.; 3. Carrot cake, in the Western sense. |
| turnip | Jicama (a root vegetable, sometimes called "Mexican turnip" in other dialects). |
| yam | Taro (another type of root vegetable). Thus, yam cakes in Singapore are not actually made from yam in the British sense (Dioscorea), rather, they are made from taro. |
Places and buildings
| armskote | A storage room in a military base where firearms are kept; equivalent to armoury or armory in other dialects. Etymologically speaking, this word seems to be a compound of arms (referring to weapons) and koṭ, meaning "barracks" in Punjabi and Hindi–Urdu. |
| bungalow | A detached, freestanding house; in its original sense, a mansion that was built during the colonial era. |
| chalet | A lodge that is booked for recreational purposes, usually one of several within the grounds of a resort, or country club dedicated to the uniformed services. |
| void deck | The ground floor of an HDB block (a public housing building), an open space sometimes used for communal activities and social functions (e.g., Malay weddings and Chinese funerals). |

=== Slang and colloquialisms ===
Some colloquial, English-derived phrases and expressions exclusive to Singaporean (and Malaysian) English include close one eye, meaning to "turn a blind eye to something", and spoil the market, meaning "to raise the bar by overachieving".

=== Loanwords from local languages ===
Terms derived or borrowed from Hokkien and Malay are commonplace in informal contexts, and are used regularly in Singlish. Some of these loanwords refer to local concepts (e.g., kaya, a type of coconut jam) and are not italicised in print. Other loanwords are generally restricted to colloquial use.

== Foreign dialects of English in Singapore ==
A wide range of foreign English dialects can be heard in Singapore. American and British accents are often heard on local television and radio due to the frequent airing of foreign television programmes.

== Singapore Colloquial English / Singlish ==
Unlike Singapore Standard English, Singlish includes many discourse particles and loan words from Malay, Mandarin and Hokkien. Many of such loan words include swear words, particularly Hokkien profanities such as "kanina" and "chee bai". Hence, it is commonly regarded with low prestige in the country and not used in formal communication.

However, Singlish has been used in several locally produced films, including Army Daze, Mee Pok Man and Talking Cock the Movie, among others. Some local sitcoms, in particular Phua Chu Kang Pte Ltd, also feature extensive use of Singlish.

The proliferation of Singlish has been controversial and the use of Singlish is not endorsed by the government. Singapore's first two prime ministers, Lee Kuan Yew and Goh Chok Tong, have publicly declared that Singlish is a substandard variety that handicaps Singaporeans, presents an obstacle to learning standard English, and renders the speaker incomprehensible to everyone except another Singlish speaker. The country's third, Lee Hsien Loong, has also said that Singlish should not be part of Singapore's identity. In addition, the government launched the Speak Good English Movement in 2000 to encourage Singaporeans to speak proper English.

Despite strong criticisms of Singlish, linguist David Yoong has put forward the argument that "Singaporeans who subscribe to Singlish and have a positive attitude towards the code see Singlish as a language that transcends social barriers" and that the language can be used to "forge rapport and, perhaps more importantly, the Singaporean identity". Sociolinguist Anthea Fraser Gupta also argues that Singlish and standard English can and do co-exist, saying that "there is no evidence that the presence of Singlish causes damage to standard English". This was followed by organisers of the Speak Good English Movement clarifying that they are "not anti-Singlish", with their primary intention instead to ensure that Singaporeans are able to speak standard English first. A spokesperson was quoted as saying: "The presence of Singlish causes damage to standard English only when people do not have a good grounding in standard English".

== English language trends in Singapore ==
In 2010, speakers of English in Singapore were classified into five different groups:

1. Those who have no knowledge of English (extremely few people, most of whom were born before the 1940s);
2. Those who regard English as a foreign language, have limited command of, and seldom speak the language (mostly the older age groups);
3. Those who learnt English at school and can use it but have a dominant other language (many people, of all ages);
4. Those who learnt English at school and use it as their dominant language (many people, of all ages);
5. Those who learnt English as a native language (sometimes as a sole native language, but usually alongside other languages) and use it as their dominant language (many people, mostly children born after 1965 to highly educated parents).

As of 2015, English is the most commonly spoken language in Singaporean homes. One effect of mass immigration into Singapore since 2000, especially from China, has been an increase in the proportion of the population to whom English is a foreign language. The most recent trend in Singapore favours an increasing use of English as well as stability in the use of Mandarin at the expense of other varieties of Chinese (apparently as the Chinese population switches first to Mandarin, then to English) while the use of Malay slowly erodes.

Language most frequently spoken at home (%)
| Language | 1990 | 2000 | 2010 | 2015 | 2020 |
|---|---|---|---|---|---|
| English | 18.8 | 23.0 | 32.3 | 36.9 | 48.3 |
| Mandarin | 23.7 | 35.0 | 35.6 | 34.9 | 29.9 |
| Chinese varieties | ? | 23.8 | 14.3 | 12.2 | 8.7 |
| Malay | 14.3 | 14.1 | 12.2 | 10.7 | 9.2 |
| Tamil | 2.9 | 3.2 | 3.3 | 3.3 | 2.5 |
| Others | ? | 0.9 | 2.3 | 2.0 | 1.4 |

In 2010, 52% of Chinese children and 26% of Malay children aged between 5 and 14 speak English at home, in contrast to 36% and 9.4% respectively in 2000.

== Other official languages in Singapore ==
English is Singapore's main and one of the four official languages, along with Malay, Chinese and Tamil. The symbolic national language is Malay for historical reasons. All official signs, legislation and documents are required to be in English, although translations in the other official languages are sometimes included, though it is not necessary. Under the education system, English is the language of instruction for all subjects except the official Mother Tongue languages (the other three official languages) and the literatures of those languages.

== See also ==
- Commonwealth English
