= Metrical Phonology: A Coursebook =

Book by Richard Hogg and C. B. McCully

Metrical Phonology: A Course Book
- Author: Richard M. Hogg, C. B. McCully
- Language: English
- Subject: metrical phonology
- Publisher: Cambridge University Press
- Publication date: 1987
- Media type: Print (hardcover)
- Pages: 279
- ISBN: 9780521316514

Metrical Phonology: A Course Book is a 1987 book by Richard M. Hogg and C. B. McCully in which the authors provide an introduction to a theory of metrical phonology.

== Reception ==
The book was reviewed by Irene Vogel, Michael Jessen and Geert Booij.
