= Marina Nespor =

Professor of linguistics (born 1949)

Marina Nespor (born 3 November 1949 in Milan, Italy) is a Professor of linguistics at the Scuola Internazionale Superiore di Studi Avanzati in Trieste, Italy, and senior researcher in the ERC PASCAL Project, a project investigating language acquisition and the nature of the biological endowment that allows humans to learn language. Much of Dr. Nespor's research focuses on the interaction of phonology and syntax: what the prosodic structure of an utterance communicates about its grammatical structure.

Nespor received a Ph.D. in linguistics from the University of North Carolina at Chapel Hill in 1977. She was elected as member of the Academia Europaea in 2008. She has served on the editorial boards of several scientific journals, including Lingua, The Linguistic Review, and Linguistics.

== Select publications ==
The 1986 book Prosodic Phonology by Marina Nespor and Irene Vogel is considered a classic work within its subfield. It introduced an analysis of prosodic structure, including elements such as meter, syllable structure, and stress patterns, within a framework of generative grammar. Using evidence from many different languages, the book investigates ways in which syntax and phonology affect one another, and how these in turn affect language perception. The book was reissued in 2007 by De Gruyter as part of their Studies in Generative Grammar series.

L'animale parlante ("The speaking animal") by Nespor and Donna Jo Napoli (2004) is an introduction to linguistics and closely related fields, aimed at readers new to the field. The book, written in Italian, introduces the standard elements of language – phonetics, phonology, morphology, syntax, and semantics – commonly encountered in linguistics courses. In addition, it provides an overview of language acquisition, speech and language pathology, signed languages, and language variation and change, in addition to discussing the relationship between human language and animal communication in other species.

Work by Nespor and colleagues considers gestures that accompany speech part of a broad system of communication prosody. Their experiments suggest that gestures help adults understand unintelligible speech or resolve ambiguity. Based on their findings, the authors propose a general system of prosody that includes gesture as well as phonological elements of speech.
