= ToBI =

Linguistic transcription convention

ToBI (/ˈtoʊbi/; an abbreviation of tones and break indices) is a set of conventions for transcribing and annotating the prosody of speech. The term "ToBI" is sometimes used to refer to the conventions used for describing American English specifically, which was the first ToBI system, developed by Mary Beckman and Janet Pierrehumbert, among others. Other ToBI systems have been defined for a number of languages; for example, J-ToBI refers to the ToBI conventions for Tokyo Japanese, and an adaptation of ToBI to describe Dutch intonation was developed by Carlos Gussenhoven, and called ToDI. Another variation of ToBI, called IViE (Intonational Variation in English), was established in 1998 to enable comparison between several dialects of British English.

== Overview ==
A full ToBI transcription consists of six parts: (a) an audio recording, (b) an electronic print-out or paper record of the F0 (fundamental pitch), (c) a tones tier, with an analysis of the tonal events in terms of H and L, (d) a words tier with the words of the utterance in ordinary writing, (e) a break-index tier showing the strength of the junctures, and (f) a miscellaneous tier with comments.

== Tonal events ==
Tonal events include pitch accents, phrase accents, and boundary tones.

Pitch accents, written as H* or L* (high and low tones, respectively), are typically realized on words that carry the most information in a sentence. For example, in the sentence "Mary went to the store to get some milk", a natural pronunciation would include pitch accents on "Mary", "store", and "milk". Other kinds of pitch accents include L*+H (a syllable which starts with a low accent and then rises) and L+H* (again low-high on one syllable, but with the second part accented).

Phrase accents, written H- or L-, are the tones between a pitch accent and a boundary tone. For example, the intonation at the end of a question might be H*L-H%, indicating that the pitch starts high, falls to a low, and rises again; or L*H-H%, indicating that the pitch starts low, then rises steadily to a high.

Boundary tones, written with H% and L%, are affiliated not to words but to phrase edges. For example, the sentence "Mary went to the store" can be pronounced as a statement or a question ("Mary went to the store." vs. "Mary went to the store?"). The contrast between the statement and the question is signalled by a boundary tone at the end of the phrase: a low boundary tone causes a falling pitch contour, signalling the statement, whereas a high boundary tone causes a rising pitch contour, signalling the question.

== Break indices ==
Break indices are numbers indicating how strong the break is between words:

- 0 = clitic boundary, e.g. who's
- 1 = normal word boundary
- 2 = perceived juncture with no intonation effect, or apparent intonational boundary without a pause or any other clues
- 3 = intermediate phrase, marked with H- or L-.
- 4 = full intonation phrase, marked L% or H%, at the end of a phrase or sentence

The English ToBI standard distinguishes four or five levels of boundary strength, corresponding roughly to breaks between constituents at different levels of the Prosodic Hierarchy. One signal of boundary strength is lengthening of the preceding syllable: the stronger the boundary, the more lengthening of the preceding syllable. In some versions, level 2 is omitted.
