= Utterance =

Smallest unit of speech

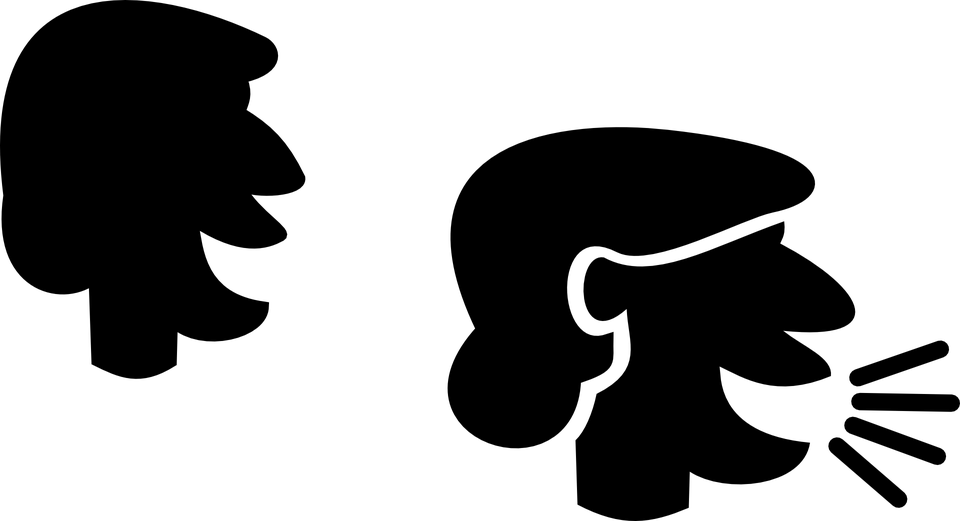
Utterance being spoken

In spoken language analysis, an utterance is a continuous piece of speech, by one person, before or after which there is silence on the part of the person. In written language, utterances only exist indirectly, through their representations or portrayals. They can be represented and delineated in written language in many ways.

In spoken language, utterances have several characteristics such as paralinguistic features, which are aspects of speech such as facial expression, gesture, and posture. Prosodic features include stress, intonation, and tone of voice, as well as ellipsis, which are words that the listener inserts in spoken language to fill gaps. Moreover, other aspects of utterances found in spoken languages are non-fluency features including: voiced or unvoiced pauses (e.g. "umm"), tag questions, and false starts, or when someone begins uttering again to correct themselves. Other features include fillers (e.g. "and stuff"), accent/dialect, deictic expressions (utterances such as "over there!" that need further explanation to be understood), simple conjunctions ("and", "but", etc.), and colloquial lexis (everyday informal words).

Utterances that are represented or portrayed in writing are planned, unlike utterances in improvised spoken language. In written language there are frameworks that are used to portray this type of language. Discourse structure (which can also be found in spoken language) is how the conversation is organized, in which adjacency pairs - an utterance and the answer to that utterance - are used. Discourse markers are used to organize conversation ("first", "secondly", etc.). Lexis denotes the words being used in a text or spoken; these words can create a semantic field. For example, a semantic field of love can be created with lexical choices such as adore, admire, and care.

== Characteristics ==
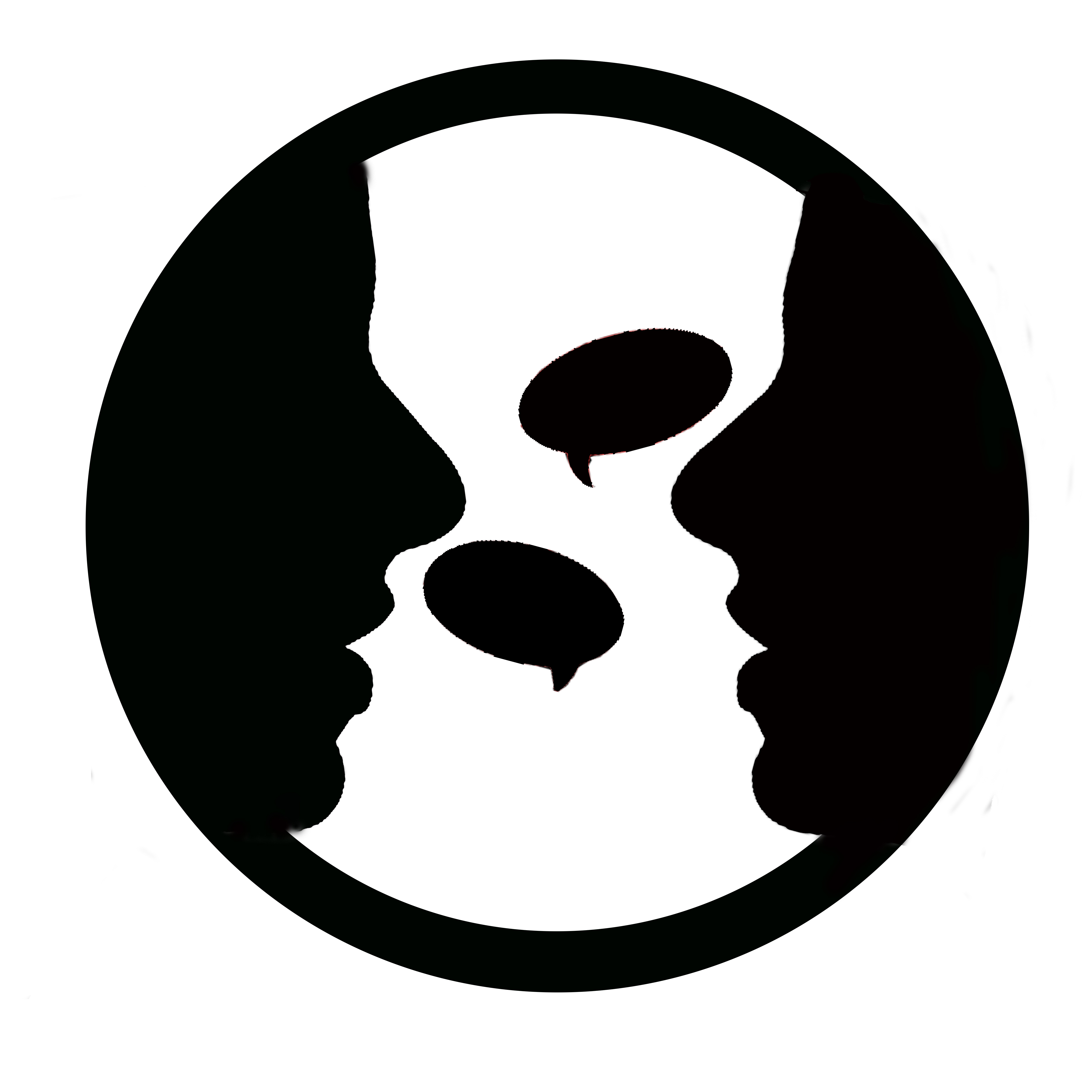
A black and white icon of two people talking to indicate discussion with one another

An utterance found in spoken or written language, as in a script, has several characteristics. These include paralinguistic features which are forms of communication that do not involve words but are added around an utterance to give meaning. Examples of paralinguistic features include facial expressions, laughter, eye contact, and gestures. Prosodic features refer to the sound of someone's voice as they speak: pitch, intonation and stress. Ellipsis can be used in either written or spoken language; for instance, when an utterance is conveyed and the speaker omits words because they are already understood in the situation. For example: A: Juice? B: Please. A: Room temperature? B: Cold.

Non-fluency features also occur when producing utterances. As people think about what to say during conversations, there are errors and corrections in speech. For example, voiced/un-voiced pauses which are "umm", "erm", etc. in voiced pauses and in transcripts un-voiced pauses are denoted as (.) or (1) relating to the amount of time of the pause. Tag questions are also a part of non-fluency features; these are used by the speaker to check if the listener understands what the speaker is saying. An example is "Do you know what I mean?" False alerts occur when the speaker is voicing an utterance but stops and starts again, usually to correct themselves.

Fillers usually give the speaker time to think and gather their thoughts in order to continue their utterance; these include lexis such as, "like", "and stuff", Accent/dialect is also a characteristic included in utterances which is the way the words are voiced, the pronunciation and the different types of lexis used in different parts of the world. Deictic expressions are utterances that need more explanation in order to be understood, like: "Wow! Look over there!" Simple conjunctions in speech are words that connect other words like "and", "but", etc. Colloquial lexis is a type of speech that is casual in which the utterance is usually more relaxed.

== Child-directed speech ==
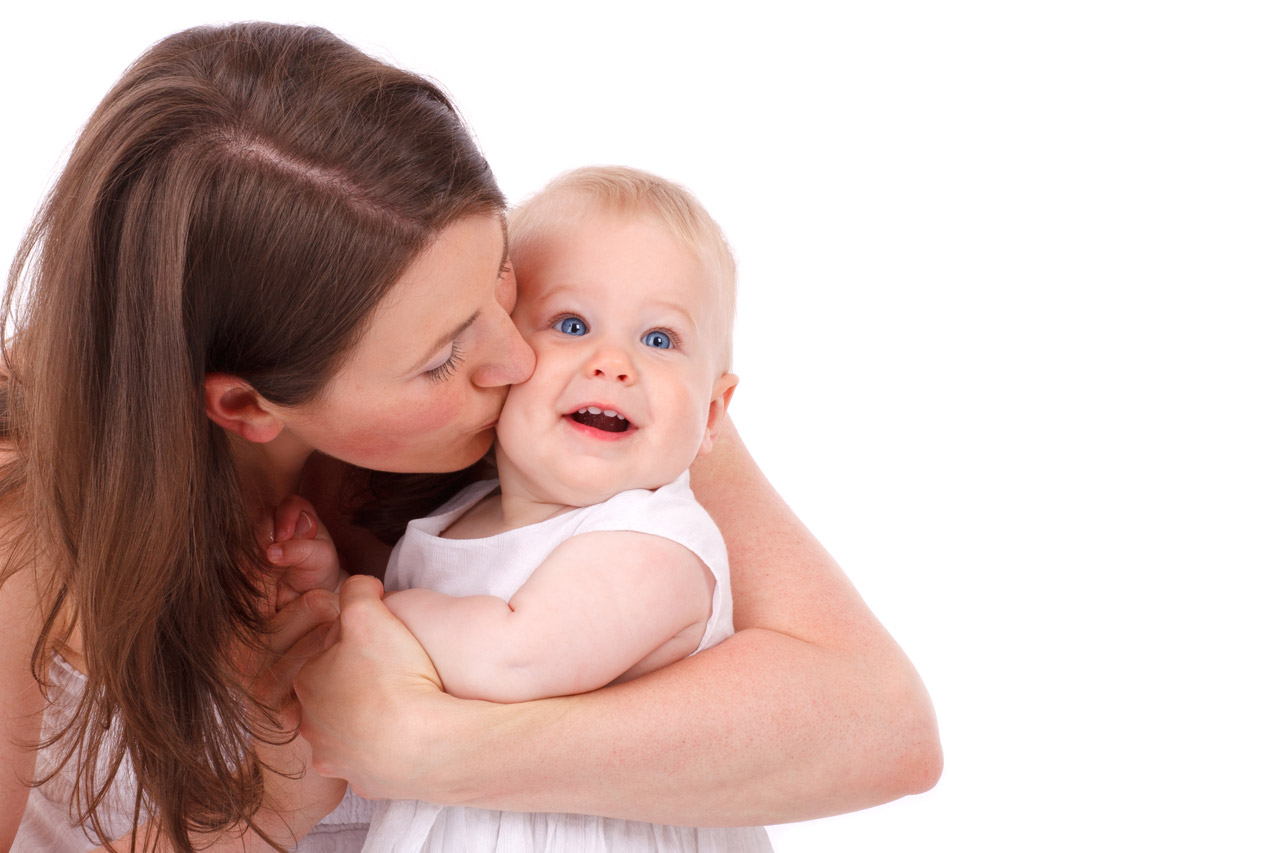
A mother kissing her baby daughter

The development of utterances in children is facilitated by parents, adults, or any other guardian the child has growing up. Studies have indicated that this development is affected by the parent, adult, or guardian's socioeconomic status (SES). It has been shown that children whose parents received more education and have higher SES have larger vocabularies and learn new words more quickly during early childhood while children with less educated parents and lower SES have a smaller vocabulary and a slower growth in their vocabulary skills (Arriaga, Fenson, Cronan & Pethick, 1998; Hart & Risley, 1995; Hoff, Laursen & Tardif, 2002; Hoff-Ginsberg, 1991; Lawrence & Shipley, 1996; Ninio, 1980). This correlation is due to the fact that more educated parents use more lexemes when speaking to their children as opposed to parents who are less educated (Hart & Risley, 1995; Hoff, 2003 a; Huttenlocher, Vasilyeva, Waterfall, Vevea & Hedges, in press). Hoff's 2003 analysis supports this correlation and shows that the mean length of utterance and vocabulary of mothers who talk to their children is related to their SES status and thus child vocabulary development. For instance, high-SES mothers use longer utterances and a wider variety of words when talking to their children. These mothers also spend more time talking to their children while low-SES mothers use shorter utterances and a smaller vocabulary. As a result, children with parents who are more educated have larger vocabularies (Hoff, 2003).

In child-directed speech, utterances have several additional features. For example, the phonology in child-directed speech is different: Utterances are spoken more slowly, with longer pauses in between utterances, higher pitches, etc. The lexis and semantics differ, and a speaker uses words suited for children, "doggie" instead of "dog", for example. The grammar is simpler, repetitive, with less use of verbs and adjectives. There is a greater use of one word utterances and the pragmatics uses supportive language like expansions and re-casting.

== Gricean maxims ==
Paul Grice (1989) came up with four maxims necessary in order to have a collegial conversation in which utterances are understood:

1. Maxim of Quantity: provide the right amount of information needed for that conversation
2. Maxim of Quality: provide information that is true
3. Maxim of Relation: provide information that is relevant to the topic at hand
4. Maxim of Manner: give order to your utterances throughout conversation, be clear

== Bakhtin's theory of utterance ==
According to philosopher Mikhail Bakhtin, there are four accepted properties that utterances should have:

- Boundaries – All utterances must be bounded by a "change of speech subject". This usually means, as previously mentioned, that they are bounded by silence.
- Responsivity or dialogicity – The utterance must be either responding/following a previous utterance or generating dialogue.
- Finalization – An utterance must have a clear ending, and only occurs if the speaker has said everything they wish to say.
- Generic form – The choice of the speech genre is determined based on the specific circumstances and sphere in which the dialogue occurs.

Bakhtin also emphasizes that an utterance and a sentence are not the same thing. According to Bakhtin, sentences do not indicate a change of speech subject, and thus do not automatically satisfy one of the four properties of utterances. According to him, the sentence as a language unit is grammatical in nature, while an utterance is "ethical".

== See also ==
- Phonological hierarchy
- Speech act
- Dialog act
- Speech processing
