= Dialog act =

Type of speech act

In linguistics and in particular in natural language understanding, a dialog act can be interpreted as the atomic units of a conversation, more fine-grained than utterances, characterized by a specific communicative function. Types of dialog acts include a question, a statement, or a request for action. Dialog acts are a type of speech act.

Dialog act recognition, also known as spoken utterance classification, is an important part of spoken language understanding. AI inference models or statistical models are used to recognize and classify dialog acts.

A dialog system typically includes a taxonomy of dialog types or tags that classify the different functions dialog acts can play. One study had 42 types of dialog act in their taxonomy. Examples of types in this study include STATEMENT, OPINION, AGREEMENT/ACCEPT, and YES-NO-QUESTION.

The research on dialog acts have increased since 1999, after spoken dialog systems became commercial reality.
