= Understanding Phonology =

Book by Carlos Gussenhoven

- Author: Carlos Gussenhoven and Haike Jacobs
- Language: English
- Subject: phonology
- Publisher: Hodder Arnold (1st ed.), Routledge (5th ed.)
- English publication date: 1st ed. (1998), 4th ed. (2017)
- Media type: Print (hardcover)

Understanding Phonology is a textbook by Carlos Gussenhoven and Haike Jacobs designed for an introductory course in phonology for students with no prior knowledge.

== Reception ==
The book was reviewed by Alain Thériault, Elizabeth Hume, Jeff Mielke, Ken Lodge and David Deterding.
