= Elisabeth Selkirk =

American linguist (born 1945)

Elisabeth O. Selkirk (born 1945) is a theoretical linguist and professor emerita in the Department of Linguistics at the University of Massachusetts, Amherst. She specializes in phonological theory and the syntax-phonology interface.

Selkirk received her PhD in linguistics from the Massachusetts Institute of Technology in 1972, under the supervision of Morris Halle. She served as head of the Linguistics Department at UMass for a term beginning in 1998.

Selkirk's influential work has focused on organizing phonological units (i.e. constituents in the prosodic hierarchy) into prosodic structure, as well as how phonology interacts with other parts of the grammar, including morphology and syntax.

== Honors and distinctions ==
She was inducted as a Fellow of the Linguistic Society of America in 2012. A volume of essays in her honor examining the phonology of many languages was published in 2011.

== Selected publications ==
- Selkirk, E. (2011). The Syntax-Phonology Interface. In J. Goldsmith, J. Riggle, and A. Yu, eds., The Handbook of Phonological Theory, 2nd edition, 435–484. Oxford: Blackwell.
- Selkirk, E. (2003). The Prosodic Structure of Function Words. In J. McCarthy, ed. Optimality Theory in Phonology: A Reader, Blackwell Publishing, 2003.
- Selkirk, E. (2003). Sentence phonology. In William Frawley and William Bright, The Oxford International Encyclopedia of Linguistics, 2nd edition. New York and Oxford: Oxford University Press.
- Selkirk, E. (2000). The interaction of constraints on prosodic phrasing. In M. Horne, ed., Prosody: Theory and Experiments, 231–261. Kluwer.
- Selkirk, E. (1982). The Syntax of Words. Cambridge (MA): MIT Press.
