= Phonological hierarchy =

Size hierarchy of phonological units

The phonological hierarchy describes a series of increasingly smaller regions of a phonological utterance, each nested within the next highest region. Different research traditions make use of slightly different hierarchies. For instance, there is one hierarchy which is primarily used in theoretical phonology, while a similar hierarchy is used in discourse analysis. Both are described in the sections below.

== Theoretical phonological hierarchy ==
Listed in order from highest to lowest are the categories of the hierarchy that are most commonly used in theoretical phonology. There is some disagreement on the arrangement and inclusion of units, especially those that reside higher in the hierarchy. For example, the clitic group is not considered to be a separate level in Selkirk's version of the hierarchy, while the minor phrase or accentual phrase are not considered to be separate from the phonological phrase in Hayes' and Nespor & Vogel's hierarchies.

1. Utterance (U)
2. Intonational phrase (I-phrase, ι) also known as:
  - Full intonational phrase
3. Phonological phrase (P-phrase, Φ), also known as:
  - Major phrase
  - Intermediate intonational phrase
4. Accentual phrase, also known as:
  - Minor phrase
5. Clitic group (C)
6. Phonological word (P-word, ω), sometimes also called the prosodic word
7. Foot (F, φ or Σ)
8. Syllable (σ)
9. Mora (μ)
10. Segment (phoneme)
11. Feature

The hierarchy from the mora upwards is technically known as the prosodic hierarchy.

== Discourse analytical hierarchy ==
The phonological hierarchy as it is defined in the discourse analytical tradition is listed below.

1. Utterance (υ)
2. Prosodic declination unit (DU)
3. Prosodic intonation unit (IU)
4. Prosodic list unit (LU)
5. Clitic group
6. Phonological word (P-word)
7. Foot
8. Syllable
9. Mora
10. Segment (phoneme)
11. Feature

== See also ==
- Phonetic word

== See also ==
- Syntactic hierarchy
