= Boundary tone =

Change in pitch at the end of an utterance

The term boundary tone refers to a rise or fall in pitch that occurs in speech at the end of a sentence or other utterance, or, if a sentence is divided into two or more intonational phrases, at the end of each intonational phrase. It can also refer to a low or high intonational tone at the beginning of an utterance or intonational phrase.

The term was first introduced in a PhD thesis on English intonation by Mark Liberman in 1975 but without being developed further. It was taken up again in 1980 in another PhD thesis on English intonation by Janet Pierrehumbert. In Pierrehumbert's model, which later developed into the ToBI system of intonational transcription, every intonational phrase is marked as ending in a boundary tone, written either H% when the speaker's voice rises up or remains high, or L% when it falls or remains low.

In modern intonational studies the term 'boundary tone' replaces the notion of 'terminal junctures' (falling #, rising //, and level /) used in earlier American studies of intonation.

== Examples of boundary tones ==
Pierrehumbert gives the example of the sentence This is my sister Mary. This can be pronounced in two ways, either as a single intonational phrase with a single high pitch on the first syllable of Mary (L L L L L H L), or as two intonational phrases with a high pitch both on sister and on Mary (L L L H L H L). If it is pronounced the second way, the words sister and Mary both have a falling intonation, and each one is transcribed by Pierrehumbert as H* L^{−} L%. Here the asterisk (*) indicates a pitch accent, the hyphen (^{−}) indicates a phrase accent, which fills the interval between the last pitch accent and the final boundary tone, and the percent symbol (%) indicates the boundary tone itself.

Pitch track illustrating the H% boundary tone, from Pierrehumbert (1980), p. 266.

In another example, in response to the question, "What about Anna? Who did she come with?", a speaker may reply Anna came with Manny. Again there are two possible pronunciations: the speaker can either say this as a single intonational phrase with a single high pitch on Manny (L L L L H L), or as two intonational phrases with one high pitch on the first syllable of Anna and another on the first syllable of Manny (H L L L H L). If the sentence is pronounced in the second way, because the word Anna is the topic of the sentence and does not give new information, it will have a slight rise in pitch on the second syllable (see the illustration). In this case it is transcribed by Pierrehumbert as H* L^{−} H%.

A boundary tone can also begin a sentence or intonational phrase. For example, the phrase Another orange would usually be pronounced with a low pitch on the first syllable. However, it can sometimes be pronounced with a high pitch on the vowel A-. Pierrehumbert marks this high pitch also with H%. (A low boundary tone at the beginning of an utterance is usually not marked by Pierrehumbert.)

== Boundary tones in other languages ==
Because of its simplicity compared with previous attempts at transcribing English intonation, Pierrehumbert's model has been influential and has been successfully adapted to several other languages, for example Persian, German, and Dutch. Some analyses use a larger number of boundary tones than L% and H%; for example for Dutch, Gussenhoven uses L%, H%, and % (no boundary tone) at the end of an utterance, and %L, %H, and %HL at the beginning; while for Italian Frota and Prieto posit six boundary tones, written L%, H%, LH%, HL%, L!H%, and H!H% (where !H represents a downstepped high tone, i.e. one slightly lower in pitch than the previous one).

== Internal boundary tones ==
A rising boundary tone can often be heard internally in a sentence in some languages, for example, to mark a topic, to mark off items in a list, or following the subordinate clause in a sentence such as "If you like it, please buy it". (See further: Chichewa tones#Boundary tones.)

== Question boundary tones ==
Boundary tones are also used to mark questions in many languages. For example, in Chichewa, a yes–no question may be indicated either by a rising tone on the final syllable, or by a high-low falling tone (e.g. mwalandirâ? "have you received it?"). In Luganda, a related language spoken in Uganda, on the contrary, a yes–no question is indicated by a low tone on the final syllable (e.g. ssóméró 'it is a school' vs. ssóméro 'is it a school?'). (See Chichewa tones and Luganda tones.)

A corpus-based study of yes–no questions in American English found that the great majority of them (approximately 90%) ended in a high boundary tone (H%), most frequently (80%) using a "low-rise" final contour transcribed L*H-H%. The next most common contour is H*H-H%, which is described as "high-rise". A typical low-rise question transcribed in the study is And do you still work for a veterinarian?, with the syllable ve- marked as L* followed by a smooth rise to a high pitch at the end. Less commonly a yes–no question will end in a "high-fall", for example, Is it treatable?, in which the word treatable is marked H*L-L%.

== See also ==
- Intonation (linguistics)
- ToBI

== Bibliography ==
- Cruttenden, Alan (1986). Intonation. Cambridge University Press.
- Frota, Sónia; & Pilar Prieto (Eds.) (2015), Intonation in Romance. Oxford: Oxford University Press.
- Grice, Martine; Stefan Baumann and Ralf Benzmüller (2005) "German Intonation in Autosegmental-Metrical Phonology". Sun-Ah Jun Prosodic Typology: The Phonology of Intonation and Phrasing. Oxford University Press, pp. 55–83.
- Gussenhoven, Carlos (2010). "Transcription of Dutch Intonation" in Sun-Ah Jun Prosodic Typology: The Phonology of Intonation and Phrasing. Oxford Scholarship Online, chapter 5. doi:10.1093/acprof:oso/9780199249633.001.0001.
- Hedberg, Nancy, Juan M. Sosa, Emrah Görgülü (2014) "The Meaning of Intonation in Yes-No Questions in American English: A Corpus Study". Published in Corpus Linguistics and Linguistic Theory, 13,2. DOI
- Liberman, Mark Y. (1975) "The Intonational System of English" Ph.D. Thesis, Massachusetts Institute of Technology.
- Myers, Scott (1996). "Boundary tones and the phonetic implementation of tone in Chichewa", Studies in African Linguistics 25, 29–60.
- Pierrehumbert, Janet B. (1980) "The Phonology and Phonetics of English Intonation" Ph.D. Thesis, Massachusetts Institute of Technology.
- Port, R. ToBI Intonation Transcription Summary, Indiana University Introduction to Phonetics course.
- Sadat-Tehrani, Nima, (2007). "The Intonational Grammar of Persian". Ph.D. Thesis, University of Manitoba.
