= Phonetic word =

Sequence of morphemes clustered around one nuclear stress

In Russian phonology and in some other languages, a phonetic word (Russian: фонетическое слово, French: mot phonétique) is a sequence of morphemes clustered around one nuclear stress. A phonetic word may contain more than one lexical item.

== Russian language ==
It may consist of a single content word and adjacent clitics (function words). It may include a proclitic (на диване, on the sofa), an enclitic (читал бы, "whether <someone> would read"), or even both: у нас бы, по Москве ли.

In most cases an accent falls on a syllable of the content word, never on the enclitic, and in rare cases it may fall on the proclitic leaving the content word unstressed: на горе́ (on a hill) vs. на́ гору (onto a hill). In modern standard Russian there is a tendency to abandon putting accent on the proclitic. Still, this is preserved in phraseologisms, such as поверить на́ слово ("take the word") or схватиться за́ голову ("to become puzzled, scared", "to repent or become sorry belatedly", literally "to clutch one's own head").

The unstressed content words are the vestige of the Old East Slavic/Proto-Slavic prosodic feature called enclinomenon (w:ru:энклиномен), a word or group of words without stress.

The concept of the phonetic word is important because quality, intensity and duration of vowels in unstressed syllables (vowel reduction) depend on their location in relation to this stressed syllable.

The concept of phonetic word should not be confused with loss of stress in rhythmic speech, e.g., in poetry, in trisyllabic metrical feet:

- Не спеши́ написа́ть мне не то́
- Есть прокля́тье заве́тов свяще́нных

== French language ==
In French language the concept of mot phonétique (also translated as phonological phrase) was introduced by François Wioland in 2005.

Les mots phonétiques sont des unités minimales de production et de perception qui signifient, que l’on peut observer dans les communications verbales, sans référence consciente à l’écrit, comme le sont les échanges et dialogues spontanés, soit présentiels, soit téléphoniques

(Phonetic words are minimal units of production and perception which have a definite meaning, which can be observed in verbal communications, without conscious reference in writing, as are spontaneous exchanges and dialogues, either face-to-face or by telephone.

A phonemic word has the following characteristics:

- It contains a small number of syllables
- Internal syllables are less important for understanding and the meaning is clear from the context
- The last syllable is pronounced stressed (accented and prolonged)

Examples:

- Single-syllable: oui; vous
- Two-syllable: bonjour; sans blague! - Stress: da daaa
- Three-syllable tout a fait; au retour - Stress: da da daaa
- Four-syllable: sans aucun doute - Stress: da da da daaa
- Six-syllable: il est américain - Stress: da da da da da daaa

Examples of phrases that consist of two three-syllable phonetic words: "ces enfants sont petits"; "il est bon en français"; "vous avez entendu?"

Mots phonétiques can have secondary accents. However the syllable preceding the main accent completely loses its accent. Also, accents tend to alternate, i.e., there will be a sequence of unaccented syllables, rather than a sequence of accented syllables. This principle is called "accent clash avoidance." According to this principle, if an utterance is grammatically split into, e.g., two mots phonétiques, then if the second one is monosyllable, the two are pronounced as one mot phonétique.

Mots phonétiques should be distinguished from rhythmic groups (groupes rythmiques).

== See also ==
- Stress in Russian language
- Syntagma (linguistics)
- Phonological word
