= Pitch accent (intonation) =

Term used in autosegmental-metrical theory

Pitch accent is a term used in autosegmental-metrical theory for local intonational features that are associated with particular syllables. Within this framework, pitch accents are distinguished from both the abstract metrical stress and the acoustic stress of a syllable. Different languages specify different relationships between pitch accent and stress placement.

== Typology ==
Languages vary in terms of whether pitch accents must be associated with syllables that are perceived as prominent or stressed. For example, in French and Indonesian, pitch accents may be associated with syllables that are not acoustically stressed, but in English and Swedish, syllables that receive pitch accents are also stressed. Languages also vary in terms of whether pitch accents are assigned lexically or post-lexically. Lexical pitch accents are associated with particular syllables within words in the lexicon and can serve to distinguish between segmentally similar words. Post-lexical pitch accents are assigned to words in phrases according to their context in the sentence and conversation. Within a word, the pitch accent is associated with the syllable marked as metrically strong in the lexicon. Post-lexical pitch accents change not the identity of the word but rather how the word fits into the conversation. The stress/no-stress distinction and the lexical/post-lexical distinction create a typology of languages with regards to their use of pitch accents.

	Stress	No Stress
Lexical	Swedish	Japanese
Post-lexical	English	Bengali

Languages that use lexical pitch accents are described as pitch accent languages, in contrast to tone/tonal languages like Mandarin Chinese and Yoruba. Pitch accent languages differ from tone languages in that pitch accents are assigned to only one syllable in a word, but tones can be assigned to multiple syllables in a word.

== Realization ==
In the ToBI system, pitch accents consist of a high (H) or low (L) pitch target or a combination of H and L targets. H and L indicate relative highs and lows in the intonation contour, and their actual phonetic realization is conditioned by a number of factors, such as pitch range and preceding pitch accents in the phrase. In languages in which pitch accents are associated with stressed syllables, one target within each pitch accent may be designated with a *, indicating that this target is aligned with the stressed syllable. For example, in the L*+H pitch accent the L target is aligned with the stressed syllable, and it is followed by a trailing H target.

This model of pitch accent structure differs from that of the British School, which described pitch accents in terms of 'configurations' like rising or falling tones. It also differs from the American Structuralists' system, in which pitch accents were made up of some combination of low, mid, high, and overhigh tones. Evidence favoring the two-level system over other systems includes data from African tone languages and Swedish. One-syllable words in Efik (an African tone language) can have high, low, or rising tones, which would lead us to expect nine possible tone combinations for two-syllable words. However, we only find H-H, L-L, and L-H tone combinations in two-syllable words. This finding makes sense if we consider the rising tone to consist of an L tone followed by an H tone, making it possible to describe one- and two-syllable words using the same set of tones. Bruce also found that alignment of the peak of a Swedish pitch accent, rather than the alignment of a rise or fall, reliably distinguished between the two pitch accent types in Swedish. Systems with several target levels often over-predict the number of possible combinations of pitch targets.

== Edge tones ==
(1)

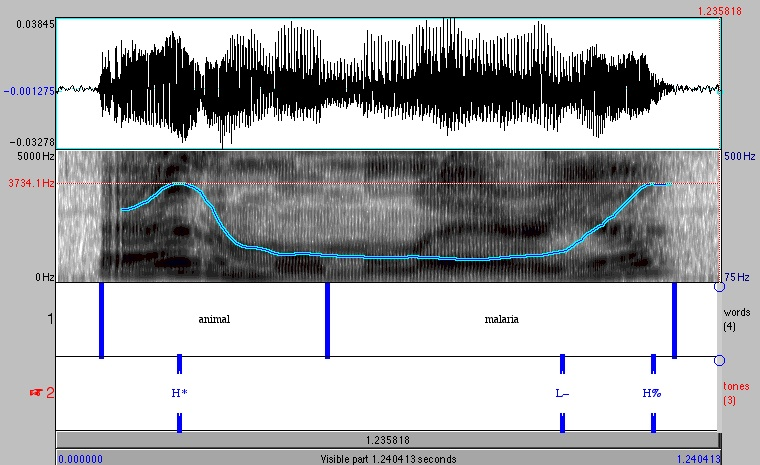
(2)

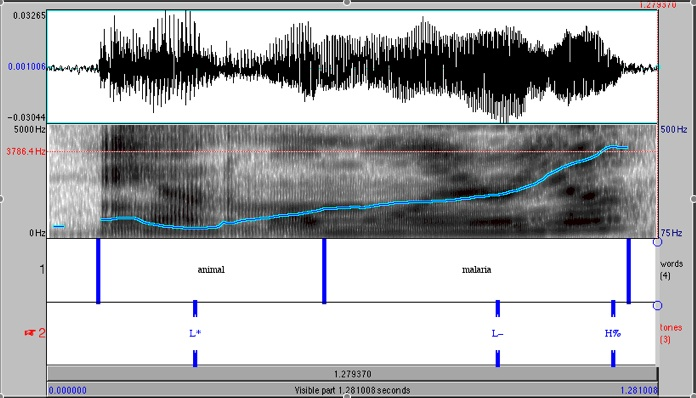
(3)

Within autosegmental-metrical theory, pitch accents are combined with edge tones, also known as boundary tones, which mark the beginnings and/or ends of prosodic phrases, to determine the intonational contour of a phrase. The need for pitch accents to be distinguished from edge tones can be seen in contours (1) and (2) in which the same intonational events - an H* pitch accent followed by an L- phrase accent and a H% boundary tone - are applied to phrases of different lengths. Note that in both cases, the pitch accent remains linked to the stressed syllable and the edge tone remains at the end of the phrase. Just as the same contour can apply to different phrases (e.g. (1) and (2)), different contours can apply to the same phrase, as in (2) and (3). In (3) the H* pitch accent is replaced with an L* pitch accent.

=== Nuclear and prenuclear pitch accents ===
Pitch accents can be divided into nuclear and prenuclear pitch accents. The nuclear pitch accent is defined as the head of a prosodic phrase. It is the most important accent in the phrase and perceived as the most prominent. In English it is the last pitch accent in a prosodic phrase. If there is only one pitch accent in a phrase, it is automatically the nuclear pitch accent. Nuclear pitch accents are phonetically distinct from prenuclear pitch accents, but these differences are predictable.

== In English ==
Pitch accents in English serve as a cue to prominence, along with duration, intensity, and spectral composition. Pitch accents are made up of a high (H) or low (L) pitch target or a combination of an H and an L target. The pitch accents of English used in the ToBI prosodic transcription system are: H*, L*, L*+H, L+H*, and H+!H*.

Most theories of prosodic meaning in English claim that pitch accent placement is tied to the focus, or the most important part, of the phrase. Some theories of prosodic marking of focus are concerned only with nuclear pitch accents.

== See also ==
- Boundary tone
- ToBI
