= Phonological word =

The phonological word, or prosodic word (commonly shortened to pword, PrWd, or symbolised as ω) is a unit in the phonological hierarchy of words. It is often larger than a syllable, but lower than a phonological phrase or an intonational phrase. A phonological word could be a bare root, a root and its affixes, or even in some cases a compound word.

== Identification of prosodic words ==
Prosodic words can be identified by domain markers: non-linguistic or phonological signs that a speaker has reached the beginning or end of a prosodic word. Examples of domain markers could be word-final devoicing or vowel harmony.

In more formal terms, a prosodic word can be described as a prosodic domain in which phonological features within the same lexical unit may spread from one morpheme to another.

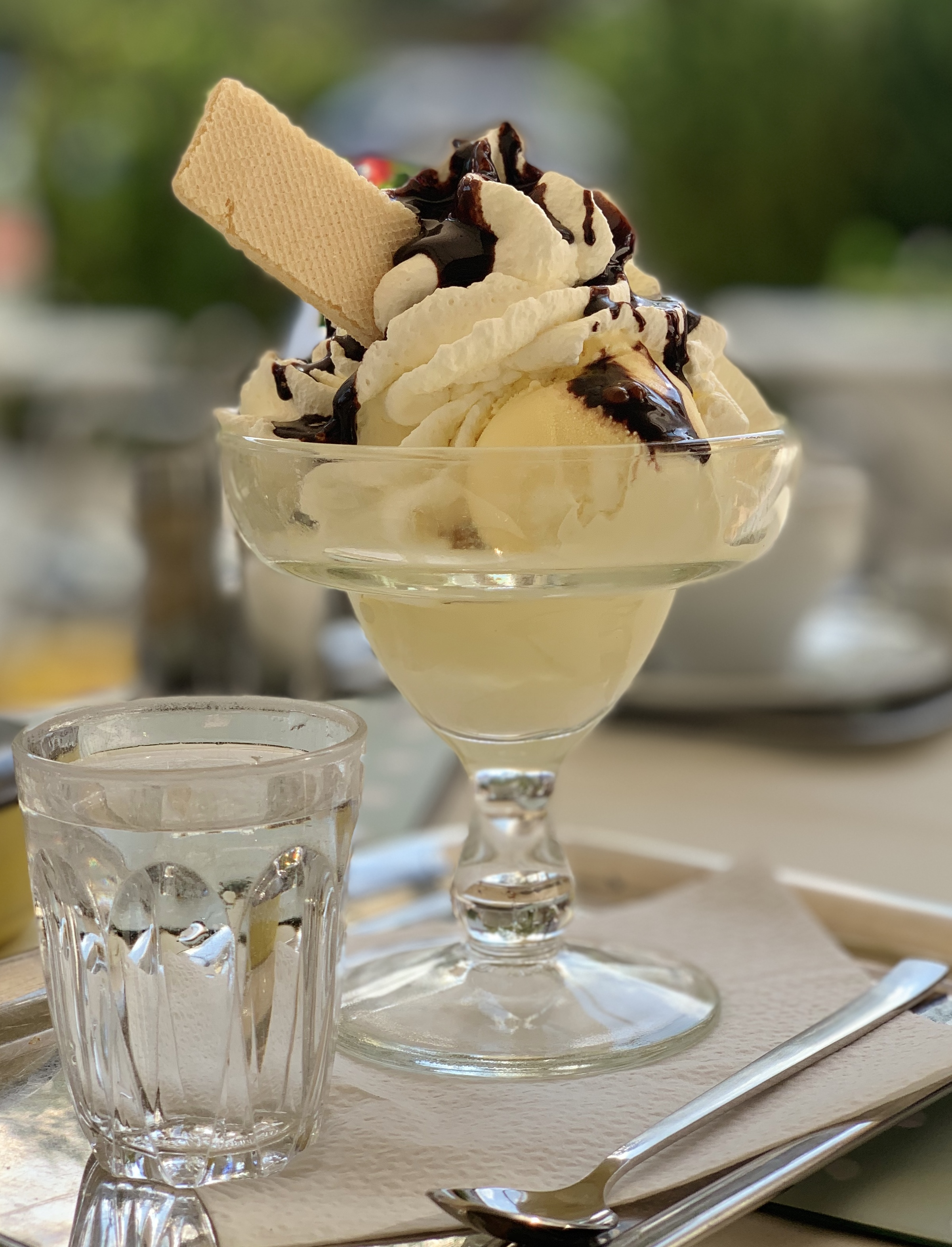
"Ice cream" is a compound word: while it counts as only one word to the syntax, it can count as two ("ice" and "cream") to the phonology.

Functional words like adpositions tend to be phonologically weak, and, as a result, they often combine to become a part of a larger prosodic word with their lexical hosts. This is common cross-linguistically. One central property of phonological words is that they bear one token of word stress.

=== Prosodic words in sign languages ===
A prosodic word in sign languages can consist of a monosyllabic sign. A monosyllabic sign can be repeated, resulting in a larger prosodic word. Domain markers in sign languages can include mouthing corresponding spoken words, pointing, or head tilting.

== Prosodic vs. grammatical word ==
The phonological word and grammatical word are not equivalent. What counts as a word for the phonology can be either smaller or larger than what counts as a word for syntactic purposes. A clear case of this mismatch is compound words, which count as two words phonologically, but one in the syntax.

== See also ==
- Phonetic word
- Prosody
