= Irene B. Vogel =

American linguist

Irene B. Vogel (born 1952) is an American linguist, specializing in phonology. She is a professor in the University of Delaware Linguistics and Cognitive Science Department, best known for her work on the phonology-syntax interface.

== Education ==
Vogel earned a BA degree in Linguistics at the University of Wisconsin (1973), Madison, and MA (1975) and PhD (1977) degrees in Linguistics at Stanford University. Her PhD dissertation is titled, The Syllable in Phonological Theory: With special reference to Italian.

== Research ==
Vogel's work has centered on prosody and the interface between prosody and (morpho-)syntax. Her widely cited 1986 book with Marina Nespor, Prosodic Phonology, is considered a foundational work in the field of the phonology-syntax interface. Using data drawn from many different languages, the book investigates ways in which syntax and phonology affect one another, and it proposes a cross-linguistic correspondence between prosodic domains (constituents in a prosodic hierarchy) and syntactic constituents within the framework of generative grammar. The book was reissued in 2007 by De Gruyter as part of their Studies in Generative Grammar series.

Other notable work by Vogel on prosody and its interfaces includes studies motivating the compound and clitic group, distinct from the word or phrase, as domains for phonological processes such as stress and vowel harmony in languages like Turkish, Hungarian, Italian (and other Romance languages).

== Selected publications ==
- Nespor, Marina; Vogel, Irene (2007). Prosodic phonology : with a new foreword. New York. ISBN 978-3-11-097779-0. OCLC 908039539.
- Kenesei, István; Vogel, Irene (1989). "Prosodic phonology in Hungarian". Acta Linguistica Hungarica. 39 (1/4): 149–193. ISSN 1216-8076. JSTOR 44362747.
- Kabak, Barış; Vogel, Irene (2001). "The phonological word and stress assignment in Turkish". Phonology. 18 (3). Cambridge University Press (CUP): 315–360. doi:10.1017/s0952675701004201. ISSN 0952-6757. S2CID 61660704.
- Vogel, Irene; Wheeldon, Linda (2010-11-25). "Units of speech production in Italian". Romance Linguistics 2009. Current Issues in Linguistic Theory. Vol. 315. Amsterdam: John Benjamins Publishing Company. pp. 95–110. doi:10.1075/cilt.315.06vog. ISBN 978-90-272-4833-6. ISSN 0304-0763.
- Vogel, Irene (1990). "The clitic group in prosodic phonology". Grammar in Progress. Berlin, New York: DE GRUYTER MOUTON. pp. 447–454. doi:10.1515/9783110867848.447. ISBN 978-3-11-013064-5.
- Vogel, Irene (2010). "The phonology of compounds". Cross-Disciplinary Issues in Compounding. Current Issues in Linguistic Theory. Vol. 311. Amsterdam: John Benjamins Publishing Company. pp. 145–164. doi:10.1075/cilt.311.12vog. ISBN 978-90-272-4827-5. ISSN 0304-0763. S2CID 124542305.
