= Carlos Gussenhoven =

Dutch linguist (born 1946)

Carlos Gussenhoven (born 19 July 1946, Amsterdam) is a professor of linguistics at Radboud University Nijmegen. He specializes in phonetics and phonology.

== Books ==
- Carlos Gussenhoven, On the Grammar and Semantics of Sentence Accents (Publications in Language Sciences), Walter de Gruyter & Co, 1984, ISBN 3-11-013066-1
- Carlos Gussenhoven & Natasha Warner, editors, Laboratory Phonology VII, Mouton de Gruyter, 2002, ISBN 3-11-017086-8
- Carlos Gussenhoven, The Phonology of Tone and Intonation (Research Surveys in Linguistics), Cambridge University Press, 2004, ISBN 0-521-01200-7
- Tomas Riad & Carlos Gussenhoven, Tones and Tunes: Typological Studies in Word and Sentence Prosody (Phonology and Phonetics), Mouton de Gruyter, 2007, ISBN 3-11-019057-5
- Carlos Gussenhoven & Tomas Riad, Tones and Tunes: Experimental Studies in Word and Sentence Prosody (Phonology and Phonetics), Mouton de Gruyter, 2007, ISBN 978-3-11-019058-8
- Carlos Gussenhoven & Haike Jacobs, Understanding Phonology (Understanding Language), Hodder Education Publishers, 4th edition, 2017, ISBN 1-4441-1204-X

== Sources ==
- Books by Gussenhoven
- About Gussenhoven
- Publications
