= Standard Chinese phonology =

The phonology of Standard Chinese has historically derived from the Beijing dialect of Mandarin. However, pronunciation varies widely among speakers, who may introduce elements of their local varieties. Television and radio announcers are chosen for their ability to affect a standard accent. The sound system has not only segments—i.e. vowels and consonants—but also tones, and each syllable has one. In addition to the four main tones, there is a neutral tone that appears on weak syllables.

This article uses the International Phonetic Alphabet (IPA) to compare the phonetic values corresponding to syllables romanized with pinyin.

== Consonants ==
The sounds shown in parentheses are sometimes not analyzed as separate phonemes; for more on these, see § Alveolo-palatal series below. Excluding these, and excluding the glides [j], [ɥ], and [w], there are 19 consonant phonemes in the inventory.

		Labial	Dental/Alveolar		Retroflex	Alveolo- palatal	Velar
		Labial	plain	sibilant	Retroflex	Alveolo- palatal	Velar
Nasal		m	n				ŋ
Plosive/ Affricate	tenuis	p	t	t͡s	ʈ͡ʂ	(t͡ɕ)	k
Plosive/ Affricate	aspirated	pʰ	tʰ	t͡sʰ	ʈ͡ʂʰ	(t͡ɕʰ)	kʰ
Fricative		f		s	ʂ	(ɕ)	x ~ h
Liquid			l ~ ɾ		ɻ ~ ʐ		

Between pairs of plosives or affricates having the same place of articulation and manner of articulation, the primary distinction is not voiced vs. voiceless (as in French or Russian), but unaspirated vs. aspirated (as in Scottish Gaelic or Icelandic). The unaspirated plosives and affricates may however become voiced in weak syllables (see § Syllable reduction below). In pinyin, an unaspirated/aspirated pair such as /p/ and /pʰ/ is represented with b and p respectively.

More details about the individual consonant sounds are given in the following table.

Phoneme or sound	Approximate description	Audio example	Pinyin	Zhuyin	Wade–Giles*	Notes
/p/	Like English p but unaspirated – as in spy	邦/bāng	b	ㄅ	p	
/pʰ/	Like an aspirated English p, as in pie	旁/páng	p	ㄆ	p῾	
/m/	Like English m	明/míng	m	ㄇ	m	
/f/	Like English f	非/fēi	f	ㄈ	f	
/t/	Like English t but unaspirated – as in sty	端/duān	d	ㄉ	t	See § Denti-alveolar and retroflex series.
/tʰ/	Like an aspirated English t, as in tie	透/tòu	t	ㄊ	t῾	See § Denti-alveolar and retroflex series.
/n/	Like English n	泥/ní	n	ㄋ	n	See § Denti-alveolar and retroflex series. Can occur in the onset and/or coda of a syllable.
/l/ ([l ~ ɾ])	Varies between l in English let and r in Spanish retar, especially in Taiwan.	来/來/lái	l	ㄌ	l	
/k/	Like English k, but unaspirated, as in scar	干/gān	g	ㄍ	k	
/kʰ/	Like an aspirated English k, as in car	口/kǒu	k	ㄎ	k῾	
/ŋ/	Like ng in English sing	江/jiāng	ng	ㄫ	ng	Occurs only in the syllable coda.
/x/ ([h ~ x])	Varies between h in English hat and ch in Scottish loch.	火/huǒ	h	ㄏ	h	
[t͡ɕ]	Like an unaspirated English ch, but with an alveolo-palatal pronunciation	叫/jiào	j	ㄐ	ch	See § Alveolo-palatal series.
[t͡ɕʰ]	As t͡ɕ/pinyin "j", with aspiration	去/qù	q	ㄑ	ch῾	See § Alveolo-palatal series.
[ɕ]	Similar to English sh, but with an alveolo-palatal pronunciation	小/xiǎo	x	ㄒ	hs	See § Alveolo-palatal series.
/ʈ͡ʂ/	Similar to ch in English chat, but with a retroflex articulation and no aspiration	之/zhī	zh	ㄓ	ch	See § Denti-alveolar and retroflex series.
/ʈ͡ʂʰ/	As ʈ͡ʂ/pinyin "zh", but with aspiration	吃/chī	ch	ㄔ	ch῾	See § Denti-alveolar and retroflex series.
/ʂ/	Similar to English sh, but with a retroflex articulation	矢/shǐ	sh	ㄕ	sh	See § Denti-alveolar and retroflex series.
/ʐ/ ([ʐ ~ ɻ]) (Note: Traditional literature and Duanmu (2007) transcribe it as voiced fricatives, while Lee & Zee (2003) and Lin (2007) transcribe it as an approximant.)	Similar to g in English beige, but with a retroflex articulation. L2 learners may pronounce it as an English r ([ɹ̠ʷ]) but retroflex and not labialised.	日/rì	r	ㄖ	j	For pronunciation in syllable-final position, see § Rhotic coda.
/t͡s/	Like English ts in cats, without aspiration	子/zǐ	z	ㄗ	ts	See § Denti-alveolar and retroflex series.
/t͡sʰ/	As t͡s/pinyin "z", but with aspiration	此/cǐ	c	ㄘ	ts῾	See § Denti-alveolar and retroflex series.
/s/	Like English s, but usually with the tongue on the lower teeth.	私/sī	s	ㄙ	s	See § Denti-alveolar and retroflex series.
*In Wade–Giles, the distinction between retroflex and alveolo-palatal affricates, which are both written as ch and ch῾, is indicated by the subsequent vowel coda, since the two consonant series occur in complementary distribution; for example, chi and chü correspond to pinyin ji and ju, respectively, whereas chih and chu correspond to pinyin zhi and zhu (see § Alveolo-palatal series).

All of the consonants may occur as the initial sound of a syllable, with the exception of /ŋ/ (unless the zero initial is assigned to this phoneme; see below). Excepting the rhotic coda, the only consonants that can appear in syllable coda (final) position are /n/ and /ŋ/ (although [m] may occur as an allophone of /n/ before labial consonants in fast speech). Final /n/, /ŋ/ may be pronounced without complete oral closure, resulting in a syllable that in fact ends with a long nasalized vowel. See also § Syllable reduction, below.

=== Denti-alveolar and retroflex series ===
The consonants listed in the first table above as denti-alveolar are sometimes described as alveolars, and sometimes as dentals. The affricates and the fricative are particularly often described as dentals; these are generally pronounced with the tongue on the lower teeth.

The retroflex consonants (like those of Polish) are actually apical rather than subapical, and so are considered by some authors not to be truly retroflex; they may be more accurately called post-alveolar. Some speakers not from Beijing may lack the retroflexes in their native dialects, and may thus replace them with dentals.

=== Alveolo-palatal series ===
The alveolo-palatal consonants (pinyin j, q, x) have standard pronunciations of [t͡ɕ, t͡ɕʰ, ɕ]. Some speakers realize them as palatalized dentals [t͡sʲ], [t͡sʰʲ], [sʲ]; this is claimed to be especially common among children and women, although officially it is regarded as substandard and as a feature specific to the Beijing dialect.

In phonological analysis, it is often assumed that, when not followed by one of the high front vowels [i] or [y], the alveolo-palatals consist of a consonant followed by a palatal glide ([j] or [ɥ]). That is, syllables represented in pinyin as beginning ⟨ji-⟩, ⟨qi-⟩, ⟨xi-⟩, ⟨ju-⟩, ⟨qu-⟩, ⟨xu-⟩ (followed by a vowel) are taken to begin [t͡ɕj], [t͡ɕʰj], [ɕj], [t͡ɕɥ], [t͡ɕʰɥ], [ɕɥ]. The actual pronunciations are more like [t͡ɕ], [t͡ɕʰ], [ɕ], [t͡ɕʷ], [t͡ɕʰʷ], [ɕʷ] (or for speakers using the dental variants, [t͡sʲ], [t͡sʰʲ], [sʲ], [t͡sᶣ], [t͡sʰᶣ], [sᶣ]). This is consistent with the general observation (see under § Glides) that medial glides are realized as palatalization and/or labialization of the preceding consonant (palatalization already being inherent in the case of the palatals).

On the above analysis, the alveolo-palatals are in complementary distribution with the dentals [t͡s, t͡sʰ, s], with the velars [k, kʰ, x], and with the retroflexes [ʈ͡ʂ, ʈ͡ʂʰ, ʂ], as none of these can occur before high front vowels or palatal glides, whereas the alveolo-palatals occur only before high front vowels or palatal glides. Therefore, linguists often prefer to classify [t͡ɕ, t͡ɕʰ, ɕ] not as independent phonemes, but as allophones of one of the other three series. The existence of the above-mentioned dental variants inclines some to prefer to identify the alveolo-palatals with the dentals, but identification with any of the three series is possible (unless the empty rime /ɨ/ is identified with /i/, in which case the velars become the only candidate). The Yale and Wade–Giles systems mostly treat the alveolo-palatals as allophones of the retroflexes; Tongyong Pinyin mostly treats them as allophones of the dentals; and Mainland Chinese Braille treats them as allophones of the velars. In pinyin and bopomofo, however, they are represented as a separate sequence.

The alveolo-palatals arose historically from a merger of the dentals [t͡s, t͡sʰ, s] and velars [k, kʰ, x] before high front vowels and glides. Previously, some instances of modern [t͡ɕ(ʰ)i] were instead [k(ʰ)i], and others were [t͡s(ʰ)i]; distinguishing these two sources of [t͡ɕ(ʰ)i] is known as the "round-sharp" distinction. The change took place in the last two or three centuries at different times in different areas. This explains why some European transcriptions of Chinese names (especially in postal romanization) contain ⟨ki-⟩, ⟨hi-⟩, ⟨tsi-⟩, ⟨si-⟩ where an alveolo-palatal might be expected in modern Chinese. Examples are Peking for Beijing ([kiŋ] → [tɕiŋ]), Chungking for Chongqing ([kʰiŋ] → [tɕʰiŋ]), Fukien for Fujian (cf. Hokkien), Tientsin for Tianjin ([tsin] → [tɕin]); Sinkiang for Xinjiang ([sinkiaŋ] → [ɕintɕiaŋ], and Sian for Xi'an ([si] → [ɕi]). The complementary distribution with the retroflex series arose when syllables that had a retroflex consonant followed by a medial glide lost the medial glide.

=== Zero onset ===
A full syllable such as ai, in which the vowel is not preceded by any of the standard initial consonants or glides, is said to have a null initial or zero onset. This may be realized as a consonant sound: [ʔ] and [ɣ] are possibilities, as are [ŋ] and [ɦ] in some non-standard varieties. It has been suggested by San Duanmu that such an onset be regarded as a special phoneme, or as an instance of the phoneme /ŋ/, although it can also be treated as no phoneme (absence of onset). By contrast, in the case of the particle 啊, a, which is a weak onset-less syllable, linking occurs with the previous syllable (as described under § Syllable reduction, below).

When a stressed vowel-initial Chinese syllable follows a consonant-final syllable, the consonant does not directly link with the vowel. Instead, the zero onset seems to intervene in between. 棉袄; mián'ǎo; 'cotton jacket' becomes [mjɛnʔau], [mjɛnɣau]. However, in connected speech none of these output forms is natural. Instead, when the words are spoken together the most natural pronunciation is rather similar to [mjɛ̃ːau], in which there is no nasal closure or any version of the zero onset, and instead nasalization of the vowel occurs.

== Glides ==
The glides [j], [ɥ], and [w] sound respectively like the y in English yes, the (h)u in French huit, and the w in English we. (Beijing speakers often replace initial [w] with a labiodental [ʋ], except when it is followed by [o] or [u].) The glides are commonly analyzed not as independent phonemes, but as consonantal allophones of the high vowels: [i̯, y̯, u̯]. This is possible because there is no ambiguity in interpreting a sequence like yao/-iao as /iau/, and potentially problematic sequences such as */iu/ do not occur.

The glides may occur in initial position in a syllable. This occurs with [ɥ] in the syllables written yu, yuan, yue, and yun in pinyin; with [j] in other syllables written with initial y in pinyin (ya, yi, etc.); and with [w] in syllables written with initial w in pinyin (wa, wu, etc.). When a glide is followed by the vowel of which that glide is considered an allophone, the glide may be regarded as epenthetic (automatically inserted), and not as a separate realization of the phoneme. Hence the syllable yi, pronounced [ji], may be analyzed as consisting of the single phoneme /i/, and similarly yin may be analyzed as /in/, yu as /y/, and wu as /u/. It is also possible to hear both from the same speaker, even in the same conversation. For example, one may hear the number "one" 一; yī as either [jí] or [í].

The glides can also occur in medial position, that is, after the initial consonant but before the main vowel. Here they are represented in pinyin as vowels: for example, the i in bie represents [j], and the u in duan represents [w]. There are some restrictions on the possible consonant-glide combinations: [w] does not occur after labials (except for some speakers in bo, po, mo, fo); [j] does not occur after retroflexes and velars (or after [f]); and [ɥ] occurs medially only in lüe and nüe and after alveolo-palatals (for which see above). A consonant-glide combination at the start of a syllable is articulated as a single sound – the glide is not in fact pronounced after the consonant, but is realized as palatalization [ʲ], labialization [ʷ], or both [ᶣ], of the consonant. (The same modifications of initial consonants occur in syllables where they are followed by a high vowel, although normally no glide is considered to be present there. Hence a consonant is generally palatalized [ʲ] when followed by /i/, labialized [ʷ] when followed by /u/, and both [ᶣ] when followed by /y/.)

The glides [j] and [w] are also found as the final element in some syllables. These are commonly analyzed as diphthongs rather than vowel-glide sequences. For example, the syllable bai is assigned the underlying representation /pai̯/. (In pinyin, the second element is generally written ⟨-i⟩ or ⟨-u⟩, but /au̯/ is written as ⟨-ao⟩.)

== Syllabic consonants ==
The syllables written in pinyin as zi, ci, si, zhi, chi, shi, ri may be described as a sibilant consonant (z, c, s, zh, ch, sh, r in pinyin) followed by a syllabic consonant (also known as apical vowel in classic literature):

- [ɹ̩ ~ z̩], a laminal denti-alveolar voiced continuant, in zi, ci, si ([tsɹ̩ tsʰɹ̩ sɹ̩]);
- [ɻ̩ ~ ʐ̩], an apical retroflex voiced continuant, in zhi, chi, shi, ri ([ʈʂɻ̩ ʈʂʰɻ̩ ʂɻ̩ ɻɻ̩]).

Alternatively, the nucleus may be described not as a syllabic consonant, but as a vowel:

- [ɨ], similar to Russian ы and the vowel in American "roses", in zi, ci, si, zhi, chi, shi, ri ([tsɨ tsʰɨ sɨ ʈʂɨ ʈʂʰɨ ʂɨ ɻɨ]).

Phonologically, these syllables may be analyzed as having their own vowel phoneme, /ɨ/. However, it is possible to merge this with the phoneme /i/ (to which it is historically related), since the two are in complementary distribution – provided that the § Alveolo-palatal series is either left un-merged, or is merged with the velars rather than the retroflex or alveolar series. (That is, [t͡ɕi], [t͡sɨ], and [ʈ͡ʂɨ] all exist, but *[ki] and *[kɨ] do not exist, so there is no problem merging both [i]~[ɨ] and [k]~[t͡ɕ] at the same time.)

Another approach is to regard the syllables assigned above to /ɨ/ as having an (underlying) empty nuclear slot ("empty rhyme", Chinese 空韵; kōngyùn), i.e. as not containing a vowel phoneme at all. This is more consistent with the syllabic consonant description of these syllables, and is consistent with the view that phonological representations are minimal (underspecified). When this is the case, sometimes the phoneme is described as shifting from voiceless to voiced, e.g. sī becoming /sź̩/.

Syllabic consonants may also arise as a result of weak syllable reduction; see below. Syllabic nasal consonants are also heard in certain interjections; pronunciations of such words include [m], [n], [ŋ], [hm], [hŋ].

== Vowels ==
Monophthongs of Mandarin Chinese as they are pronounced in Beijing (from Lee & Zee (2003:110)).

Part 1 of Mandarin Chinese diphthongs as they are pronounced in Beijing (from Lee & Zee (2003:110)).

Part 2 of Mandarin Chinese diphthongs as they are pronounced in Beijing (from Lee & Zee (2003:110)).

Standard Chinese can be analyzed as having between two and six vowel phonemes. /i, u, y/ (which may also be analyzed as underlying glides) are high (close) vowels, /ə/ is mid whereas /a/ is low (open).

The precise realization of each vowel depends on its phonetic environment. In particular, the vowel /ə/ has two broad allophones [e] and [o] (corresponding respectively to pinyin e and o in most cases). These sounds can be treated as a single underlying phoneme because they are in complementary distribution. The mid vowel phoneme may also be treated as an under-specified vowel, attracting features either from the adjacent sounds or from default rules resulting in /ə/. (Apparent counterexamples are provided by certain interjections, such as [ɔ], [ɛ], [jɔ], and [lɔ], but these are normally treated as special cases operating outside the normal phonemic system. (Note: Compare the normal treatment in English phonology of "hmm", "unh-unh", "shhh!", and other exclamations that violate usual phonotactic and allophonic rules.))

Transcriptions of the vowels' allophones (the ways they are pronounced in particular phonetic environments) differ somewhat between sources. More details about the individual vowel allophones are given in the following table (not including the values that occur with the rhotic coda). (Note: The values of the vowels are discussed in Lee & Zee (2003:110–111), Duanmu (2007:55–58), and Lin (2007:65))

Phoneme	Allophone	Description	Example	Pinyin	Wade–Giles	Gwoyeu Romatzyh
Depends on analysis (see below)	[i]	Like English ee as in bee	比/bǐ	i	i	i
Depends on analysis (see below)	[u]	Like English oo as in boo	不/bù	u	u	u
Depends on analysis (see below)	[ʊ]	Like English oo in took (varies between [o] and [u] depending on the speaker.)	空/kōng	o	u	o
Depends on analysis (see below)	[y]	Like French u or German ü	女/nǚ	ü, u	ü	iu
/ə/	[e]	Somewhat like English ey as in prey	别/bié	e, ê	e, eh	e
/ə/	[o]	Somewhat like southern British English awe or Scottish English oh	火/huǒ	o	o	o
/ə/	[ɤ]	Pronounced as a sequence [ɰɤ̞].	和/hé	e	ê, o	e
/ə/	[ə]	Schwa, like English a as in about.	很/hěn	e	ê, u	e
/a/	[a]	Like English a as in father	爸/bà	a	a	a
/a/	[ɛ]	Like English e as in then (varies between [e] and [a] depending on the speaker)	边/biān	a	e, a	a

Zhuyin (Bopomofo) represents vowels differently from normal romanisation schemes, and as such is not displayed in the above table.

The vowel nuclei may be preceded by a glide /j, w, ɥ/, and may be followed by a coda /i, u, n, ŋ/. The various combinations of glide, vowel, and coda have different surface manifestations, as shown in the tables below. Any of the three positions may be empty, i.e. occupied by a null meta-phoneme ∅.

=== Five vowel analysis (pinyin-based) ===
The following table provides a typical five vowel analysis according to Duanmu (2000, p. 37) and Lin (2007). In this analysis, the high vowels /i, u, y/ are fully phonemic and may form sequences with the nasal codas /n, ŋ/.

Nucleus		∅	/i/			/u/		/y/		/ə/					/a/				
Coda		∅	∅	/n/	/ŋ/	∅	/ŋ/	∅	/n/	∅	/i/	/u/	/n/	/ŋ/	∅	/i/	/u/	/n/	/ŋ/
Medial	∅	[ɹ̩~ɻ̩] -i (ㄭ)^{4}	[⁽ʲ⁾i] yi -i ㄧ	[in] yin -in ㄧㄣ	[iŋ] ying -ing ㄧㄥ	[⁽ʷ⁾u] wu -u ㄨ	[ʊŋ]^{3} -ong ㄨㄥ	[y] yu -ü^{1} ㄩ	[yn] yun -ün^{1} ㄩㄣ	[ɤ] ([e], [o]) e (ê, o) -e (-ê, -o) ㄜ (ㄝ, ㄛ)	[ei̯] ei -ei ㄟ	[ou̯] ou -ou ㄡ	[ən] en -en ㄣ	[əŋ] eng -eng ㄥ	[a] a -a ㄚ	[ai̯] ai -ai ㄞ	[au̯] ao -ao ㄠ	[an] an -an ㄢ	[aŋ] ang -ang ㄤ
Medial	/j/						[jʊŋ] yong -iong ㄩㄥ			[je] ([jo]) ye (yo) -ie (-io) ㄧㄝ (ㄧㄛ)		[jou̯] ([iu]) you -iu ㄧㄡ			[ja] ya -ia ㄧㄚ		[jau̯] yao -iao ㄧㄠ	[jɛn] yan -ian ㄧㄢ	[jaŋ] yang -iang ㄧㄤ
Medial	/w/									[wo] wo -uo^{2} ㄨㄛ	[wei̯] ([ui]) wei -ui ㄨㄟ		[wən] ([un]) wen -un ㄨㄣ	[wəŋ]^{3} weng ㄨㄥ	[wa] wa -ua ㄨㄚ	[wai̯] wai -uai ㄨㄞ		[wan] wan -uan ㄨㄢ	[waŋ] wang -uang ㄨㄤ
Medial	/ɥ/									[ɥe] yue -üe^{1} ㄩㄝ								[ɥɛn] yuan -üan^{1} ㄩㄢ	

^{1} ü is written as u after j, q, or x (the /u/ phoneme never occurs in these positions);
^{2} uo is written as o after b, p, m, or f;
^{3} [wəŋ] and [ʊŋ] are in complementary distribution.
^{4} The letter ㄭ is used for analytical purposes only; it is usually omitted in the usual transcription.

=== Two vowel analysis (bopomofo-based) ===
Some linguists prefer to reduce the number of vowel phonemes drastically (at the expense of including underlying glides in their systems). Edwin G. Pulleyblank has proposed a system which includes underlying glides, but no vowels at all. More common are systems with two vowels; for example, in Mantaro Hashimoto's system, there are just two vowel nuclei, /ə, a/. In this analysis, the high vowels [i, u, y] are analyzed as glides /j, w, ɥ/ which surface as vowels before ∅ or /ən, əŋ/.

Nucleus		∅	/ə/					/a/				
Coda		∅	∅	/i/	/u/	/n/	/ŋ/	∅	/i/	/u/	/n/	/ŋ/
Medial	∅	[ɹ̩~ɻ̩] (ㄭ)	[o, ɤ, e] ㄛ，ㄜ，ㄝ	[ei̯] ㄟ	[ou̯] ㄡ	[ən] ㄣ	[əŋ] ㄥ	[a] ㄚ	[ai̯] ㄞ	[au̯] ㄠ	[an] ㄢ	[aŋ] ㄤ
Medial	/j/	[i] ㄧ	[je, jo] ㄧㄝ，ㄧㄛ		[jou̯] ㄧㄡ	[in] ㄧㄣ	[iŋ] ㄧㄥ	[ja] ㄧㄚ	*[jai̯] *ㄧㄞ	[jau̯] ㄧㄠ	[jɛn] ㄧㄢ	[jaŋ] ㄧㄤ
Medial	/w/	[u] ㄨ	[wo] ㄨㄛ	[wei̯] ㄨㄟ		[wən] ㄨㄣ	[wəŋ], [ʊŋ] ㄨㄥ	[wa] ㄨㄚ	[wai̯] ㄨㄞ		[wan] ㄨㄢ	[waŋ] ㄨㄤ
Medial	/ɥ/	[y] ㄩ	[ɥe] ㄩㄝ			[yn] ㄩㄣ	[jʊŋ] ㄩㄥ				[ɥɛn] ㄩㄢ	

=== Other notes ===
As a general rule, vowels in open syllables (those which have no coda following the main vowel) are pronounced long, while others are pronounced short. This does not apply to weak syllables, in which all vowels are short.

In Standard Chinese, the vowels [a] and [ə] harmonize in backness with the coda. For [a], it is fronted [a̟] before /i, n/ and backed [a̠] before /u, ŋ/. For [ə], it is fronted [ə̟] before /n/ and backed [ə̠] before /ŋ/.

Some native Mandarin speakers may pronounce [wei̯], [jou̯], and [wən] as [ui], [iu], and [un] respectively in the first or second tone.

== Rhotic coda ==
Standard Chinese features syllables that end with a rhotic coda /ɚ/. This feature, known in Chinese as erhua, is particularly characteristic of the Beijing dialect; many other dialects do not use it as much, and some not at all. It occurs in two cases:

1. In a small number of independent words or morphemes pronounced [ɚ] in Taiwan or [aɚ̯] in China, written in pinyin as er, with some tone, such as 二; èr; 'two', 耳; ěr; 'ear', and 儿; 兒; ér; 'son'.
2. In syllables in which the rhotic coda is added as a suffix to another morpheme. This suffix is represented by the character 儿; 兒; ér; 'son', to which meaning it is historically related, and in pinyin as r. The suffix combines with the final sound of the syllable, and regular but complex sound changes occur as a result (described in detail under erhua).

The r final is pronounced with a relatively lax tongue, and has been described as a "retroflex vowel".

In dialects that do not make use of the rhotic coda, it may be omitted in pronunciation, or in some cases a different word may be selected: for example, Beijing 这儿; 這兒; zhèr; 'here' and 那儿; 那兒; nàr; 'there' may be replaced by the synonyms 这里; 這裡; zhèlǐ and 那里; 那裡; nàlǐ.

== Syllables ==
Syllables in Standard Chinese have the maximal form (CG)V(X)^{T}, traditionally analysed as an "initial" consonant C, a "final", and a tone T. The final consists of a "medial" G (which may be one of the glides [j, w, ɥ]), a vowel V, and a coda X, which may be one of [n, ŋ, ɚ̯, i̯, u̯]. The vowel and coda may also be grouped as the "rhyme", sometimes spelled "rime". Any of C, G, and X (and V, in some analyses) may be absent. However, in some analyses, C cannot be absent, due to the zero initial being considered a consonant.

Only a few of the permutations possible under the above scheme actually occur. There are only some 35 final combinations (medial+rime) in actual syllables (see pinyin finals). There are only about 400 different syllables when tone is ignored, and only about 1300 when it is taken into account. This is a far smaller number of distinct syllables than one finds in English. Since a Chinese syllable usually constitutes a whole word, or morpheme at least, there are a lot of homophones. On the other hand, in Standard Chinese, the average word has almost exactly two syllables, eliminating most homophony issues, even when tone is disregarded, especially when context is taken into account. (Still, due to the limited phonetic inventory, homophonic puns in Mandarin Chinese are very common and important in Chinese culture.)

For a list of all Standard Chinese syllables (excluding tone and rhotic coda) see the pinyin table or zhuyin table.

=== Full and weak syllables ===
Syllables can be classified as full (or strong), and weak. Weak syllables are usually grammatical markers such as 了; le , or the second syllables of some compound words (although many other compounds consist of two or more full syllables).

A full syllable carries one of the four main tones, and some degree of stress. Weak syllables are unstressed, and have neutral tone. The contrast between full and weak syllables is distinctive; there are many minimal pairs such as 要事; yàoshì; 'important matter' and 钥匙; yàoshi; 'key', or 大意; dàyì; 'main idea' and (with the same characters) 大意; dàyi; 'careless', the second word in each case having a weak second syllable. Some linguists consider this contrast to be primarily one of stress, while others regard it as one of tone. For further discussion, see Neutral tone and Stress below.

There is also a difference in syllable length. Full syllables can be analyzed as having two morae ("heavy"), the vowel being lengthened if there is no coda. Weak syllables, however, have a single mora ("light"), and are pronounced approximately 50% shorter than full syllables. Any weak syllable will usually be an instance of the same morpheme (and written with the same character) as some corresponding strong syllable; the weak form will often have a modified pronunciation, however, as detailed in the following section.

=== Syllable reduction ===
Apart from differences in tone, length, and stress, weak syllables are subject to certain other pronunciation changes (reduction).

- If a weak syllable begins with an unaspirated obstruent (/p, t, k, t͡s, t͡ʂ, t͡ɕ/), that consonant may become voiced ([b, d, ɡ, d͡z, d͡ʐ, d͡ʑ] respectively). For example, in 嘴巴; zuǐba; 'mouth' , the second syllable is likely to begin with a [b] sound, rather than an unaspirated [p], and in 飞机; feījī; 'airplane', the second syllable is likely to begin with [d͡ʑ] instead of an unaspirated [t͡ɕ].
- The vowel of a weak syllable is often reduced, becoming more central. For example, in the word zuǐba just mentioned, the final vowel may become a schwa [ə].
- The coda (final consonant or offglide) of a weak syllable is often dropped (this is linked to the shorter, single-mora nature of weak syllables, as referred to above). If the dropped coda was a nasal consonant, the vowel may be nasalized. For example, 脑袋; nǎodai; 'head' may end with a monophthong [ɛ] rather than a diphthong, and 春天; chūntian; 'spring' may end with a centralized and nasalized vowel [ə̃].
- In some cases, the vowel may be dropped altogether. This may occur, particularly with high vowels i, u, ü, when the unstressed syllable begins with a fricative f, h, sh, r, x, s or an aspirated p, t, k, q, ch, c consonant; for example, 豆腐; dòufu; 'tofu' may be said as dòu-f, and 问题; wènti; 'question' as wèn-t (the remaining initial consonant is pronounced as a syllabic consonant). The same may even occur in full syllables that have low ("half-third") tone. The vowel (and coda) may also be dropped after a nasal, in such words as 我们; wǒmen; 'we' and 什么; shénme; 'what', which may be said as wǒm and shém – these are examples of the merger of two syllables into one, which occurs in a variety of situations in connected speech.

The example of shénme → shém also involves assimilation, which is heard even in unreduced syllables in quick speech (for example, in guǎmbō for 广播; guǎngbō; 'broadcast'. A particular case of assimilation is that of the sentence-final exclamatory particle 啊; a, a weak syllable, which has different characters for its assimilated forms:

Preceding sound	Form of particle (pinyin)	Character
[ŋ], [ɹ̩], [ɻ̩]	a	啊
[i], [y], [e], [o], [a]	ya (from ŋja)	呀
[u]	wa	哇
[n]	na	哪
了 le (grammatical marker)	combines to form la	啦

== Tones ==
Standard Chinese tone contours

In Beijing

In Taipei

Standard Chinese, like all varieties of Chinese, is tonal. This means that in addition to consonants and vowels, the pitch contour of a syllable is used to distinguish words from each other. Many non-native Chinese speakers have difficulties mastering the tones of each character, but correct tonal pronunciation is essential for intelligibility because of the vast number of words in the language that only differ by tone (i.e. are minimal pairs with respect to tone). Statistically, tones are as important as vowels in Standard Chinese. (Note: "A word pronounced in a wrong tone or inaccurate tone sounds as puzzling as if one said 'bud' in English, meaning 'not good' or 'the thing one sleeps in.'" Chao (1948), p. 24)

The following table shows the four main tones of Standard Chinese, together with the neutral (or fifth) tone. To describe the pitch of the tones, its representation on a five-level scale is used, visualized with Chao tone letters. The values of the pitch for each tone described by Chao are traditionally considered standard, however slight regional and idiolectal variations in tone pronunciation also occur.

Tone number		1	2	3	4	5
Description		high	rising	low (dipping)	falling	neutral
Pinyin diacritic		ā	á	ǎ	à	a
Pitch contour	per Chao (1968)	˥ 55	˧˥ 35	˨˩˦ 21(4)	˥˩ 51, ˥˧ 53	(various, see below)
Pitch contour	Common realization (Beijing)	˥ 55, ˦ 44	˨˥ 25	˨˩˨ 21(2)	˥˨ 52, ˥˧ 53	(various, see below)
Pitch contour	Common realization (Taipei)	˦ 44	˧˨˧ 323	˧˩˨ 31(2)	˥˨ 52, ˥˧ 53	(various, see below)
Pitch contour	Other substandard variants	˥˦ 54, ˦˥ 45	˧˨˥ 325, ˨˦ 24	˨˩˧ 21(3), ˨ 22	˦˨ 42	(various, see below)
IPA diacritic		/á/	/ǎ/ [a᷄]	/à/ [à̰, a̰᷆, a̰᷉]	/â/	(various, see below)
Tone name		阴平; 陰平; yīnpíng	阳平; 陽平; yángpíng	上; shǎng	去; qù	轻; 輕; qīng
Examples		巴/bā	拔/bá	把/bǎ	爸/bà	吧/ba

The syllable ma with each of the primary tones in Standard Mandarin Chinese

The Chinese names of the main four tones are respectively 阴平; 陰平; yīnpíng; 'dark level', 阳平; 陽平; yángpíng; 'light level', 上; shǎng or shàng; 'rising', and 去; qù; 'departing'. As descriptions, they apply rather to the predecessor Middle Chinese tones than to the modern tones.

Most romanization systems, including pinyin, represent the tones as diacritics on the vowels, as does bopomofo. Some, like Wade–Giles, use superscript numbers at the end of each syllable. The tone marks and numbers are rarely used outside of language textbooks: in particular, they are usually absent in public signs, company logos, and so forth. Gwoyeu Romatzyh is a rare example of a system where tones are represented using normal letters of the alphabet (although without a one-to-one correspondence).

=== First tone ===
First tone is a high-level tone. It is a steady high sound, produced as if it were being sung instead of spoken. Its pitch is usually ˥ 55 or ˦ 44, at the same level where the fourth tone starts, or a little lower. Occasionally, slightly rising or falling high pitch (˥˦ 54 or ˦˥ 45) is also possible.

In a few syllables, the quality of the vowel is changed when it carries first tone; see the vowel table above.

=== Second tone ===
Second tone is a rising tone. It is usually described as a high-rising (˧˥ 35), with the sound that rises from middle to high pitch (like in the English "What?!"). It starts at around pitch level 3 or 2, and then rises towards the level of the first tone pitch (5 or 4).

It may also start with a falling or flat segment, which is quite short in male speakers (a quarter of the total second tone length), but longer in female speakers, reaching nearly half of the total length of the second tone. This initial dip is more apparent in Southern China Mandarin accent, including Standard Taiwanese Mandarin, where the second tone is also lower and alternatively described as dipping or low-rising with overall contour of ˧˨˧ 323 (its start is still slightly lower than its final pitch).

This tone is usually one of the most difficult to master for Mandarin learners, as well as the speakers of non-Mandarin Chinese varieties, who often pronounce their second tone close to (full) third tone, especially in the word-final position before a pause.

=== Third tone ===
Third tone is a low tone. It is also often termed a "dipping tone".

This tone is often demonstrated as having a rise in pitch after the low fall; however, third tone syllables that include the rise are significantly longer than other syllables. When a third-tone syllable is not said in isolation, this rise is normally heard only if it appears at the end of a sentence or before a pause, and then usually only on stressed monosyllables. The third tone without the rise is sometimes called half third tone.

The overall pitch contour of the third tone is traditionally described as ˨˩˦ 214, but for modern Standard Chinese speakers, the rise, if present, is not that high. The third tone starts lower or around the starting point for the second tone. In Beijing, its value inclines to ˨˩˧ 213 or ˨˩˨ 212, while in Taiwan it is usually ˧˩˨ 312 (Taiwanese Standard Chinese speakers also tend to never pronounce the rising part in any context). Unlike the other tones, third tone is usually pronounced with creaky voice.

Two consecutive third tones are avoided by changing the first to second tone; see § Third tone sandhi below.

=== Fourth tone ===
Fourth tone is a falling tone. It features a sharp fall from high to lower pitch (as is heard in curt commands in English, such as "Stop!").

It starts at the same pitch level or higher than the first tone, and then drops to the pitch 1 or 2. In connected speech, when followed by syllables with other full tones, it tends to fall only from high to mid-level. Similarly to the third tone, the final part is only pronounced before a pause or an unstressed syllable. Two consecutive fourth tones are pronounced in a zigzag pattern, with the first one higher, and the second one lower (˥˧ 53 - ˦˩ 41).

=== Neutral tone ===
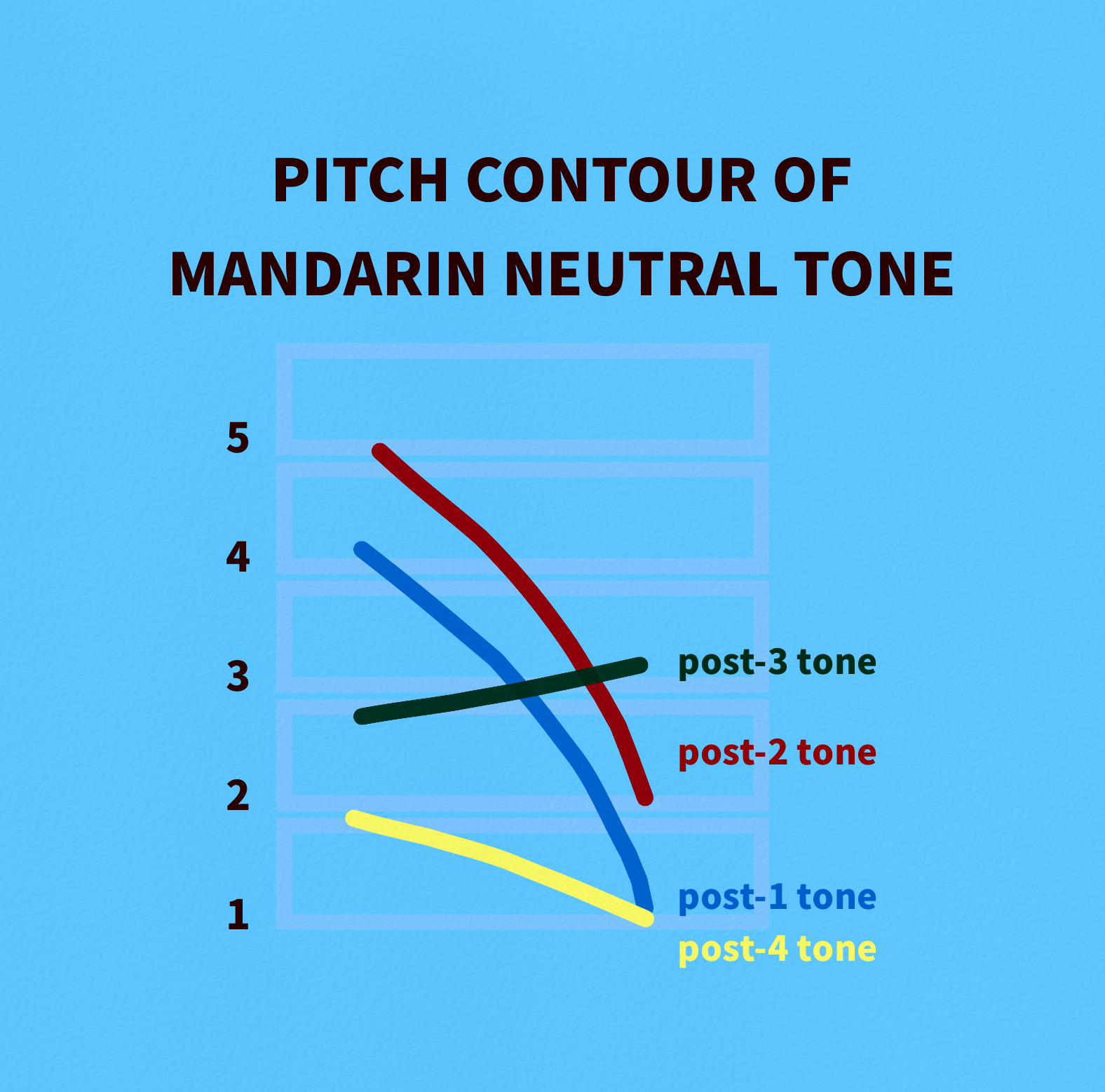
Pitch contours of the neutral tone.

Also called fifth tone or zeroth tone (轻声; 輕聲; qīngshēng; 'light tone'), the neutral tone is sometimes thought of as a lack of tone. It is associated with weak syllables, which are generally somewhat shorter than tonic syllables.

In Standard Chinese, about 15–20% of the syllables in written texts are considered unstressed, including certain suffixes, clitics, and particles. Second syllables of some disyllabic words are also unstressed in Northern Mandarin accents, but many Mandarin speakers in Southern China tend to preserve their inherent tone.

The pitch of a syllable with neutral tone is determined by the tone of the preceding syllable. Chao (1968) considered the neutral tone syllables to not have pitch contour. He introduced special dotted tone letters to denote its pitch. Later studies, however, found that the neutral tone syllables do have pitch contour. The following table shows the pitch at which the neutral tone is pronounced in Standard Chinese after each of the four main tones. For contoured pitch analysis, the first column shows the pitch contour directly after the full tone syllable, and the second column shows the pitch contour after another neutral tone syllable.

Realization of neutral tones
Tone of preceding syllable	Pitch of neutral tone			Example			
Tone of preceding syllable	Contourless	Contoured		Characters	Pinyin	Meaning	Transcription
Tone of preceding syllable	Contourless	first syllable	second syllable	Characters	Pinyin	Meaning	Transcription
First ˥	˨ ( ꜋ ) 2	˦˩ 41	˨˩ 21	玻璃(的)	bōli (de)	'[of the] glass'	[pwo˥ li˦˩ də˨˩]
Second ˧˥	˧ ( ꜊ ) 3	˥˨ 52	˧˨ 32	伯伯(的)	bóbo (de)	'[of an] uncle'	[pwo˨˥ bwo˥˨ də˧˨]
Third ˨˩	˦ ( ꜉ ) 4	˧ 33 ~ ˨˧ 23	˧˨ 32	喇叭(的)	lǎba (de)	'[of a] horn'	[lä˨˩ bä˨˧ də˧˨]
Fourth ˥˩	˩ ( ꜌ ) 1	˨˩ 21	˩ 11	兔子(的)	tùzi (de)	'[of a] rabbit'	[tʰu˥˨ d͡zɨ˨˩ də˩]

Although the contrast between weak and full syllables is often distinctive, the neutral tone is often not described as a full-fledged tone; some linguists feel that it results from a "spreading out" of the tone on the preceding syllable. This idea is appealing because without it, the neutral tone needs relatively complex tone sandhi rules to be made sense of; indeed, it would have to have four allotones, one for each of the four tones that could precede it. However, the "spreading" theory incompletely characterizes the neutral tone, especially in sequences where more than one neutral-tone syllable is found adjacent. In Modern Standard Mandarin as applied in A Dictionary of Current Chinese, the second syllable of words with a 'toneless final syllable variant' (重·次輕詞語) can be read with either a neutral tone or with the normal tone.

=== Relationship between Middle Chinese and modern tones ===
The four tones of Middle Chinese are not in one-to-one correspondence with the modern tones. The following table shows the development of the traditional tones as reflected in modern Standard Chinese. The development of each tone depends on the initial consonant of the syllable: whether it was a voiceless consonant (denoted in the table by v−), a voiced obstruent (v+), or a sonorant (s). (The voiced–voiceless distinction has been lost in modern Standard Chinese.)

Middle Chinese	Tone	píng (平)			shǎng (上)			qù (去)			rù (入)		
Middle Chinese	Initial	v−	s	v+	v−	s	v+	v−	s	v+	v−	s	v+
Standard Chinese	Tone name	yīnpíng (1st)	yángpíng (2nd)		shǎng (3rd)		qù (4th)				redistributed with no pattern	qù (4th)	yángpíng (2nd)
Standard Chinese	Tone contour	55	35		21(4)		51				redistributed with no pattern	51	35

== Tone sandhi ==
Pronunciation also varies with context according to the rules of tone sandhi. Some such changes have been noted above in the descriptions of the individual tones; however, the most prominent phenomena of this kind relate to consecutive sequences of third-tone syllables. There are also a few common words that have variable tone.

=== Third tone sandhi ===
The principal rule of third tone sandhi is:

- When there are two consecutive third-tone syllables, the first of them is pronounced with second tone.

For example, 老鼠; lǎoshǔ; 'mouse' is pronounced [lau̯˧˥ʂu˨˩˦] as if it were láoshǔ. It has been investigated whether the rising contour (˧˥) on the prior syllable is in fact identical to a normal second tone. It has been concluded that it is identical at least in terms of auditory perception.

When there are three or more third tones in a row, the situation becomes more complicated since a third tone that precedes a second tone resulting from third tone sandhi may or may not be subject to sandhi itself. The results may depend on word boundaries, stress, and dialectal variations. General rules for three-syllable third-tone combinations can be formulated as follows:

1. If the first word is two syllables and the second word is one syllable, the first two syllables become second tones. For example, 保管好; bǎoguǎn hǎo; 'to take good care of' is pronounced báoguán hǎo [pau̯˧˥kwan˧˥xau̯˨˩˦].
2. If the first word has one syllable, and the second word has two syllables, the second syllable becomes second tone, but the first syllable remains third tone. For example, 老保管; lǎo bǎoguǎn; 'to take care of all the time' is pronounced lǎo báoguǎn [lau̯˨˩pau̯˧˥kwan˨˩˦].

Some linguists have put forward more comprehensive systems of sandhi rules for multiple third tone sequences. For example, it has been proposed that modifications are applied cyclically, initially within rhythmic feet (trochees; see below) and that sandhi "need not apply between two cyclic branches".

=== Tones on special syllables ===
Special rules apply to the tones heard on the morphemes 不 (bù; 'not') and 一 (yī; 'one').

For 不 (bù):

1. 不 is pronounced with second tone when followed by a fourth tone syllable.
  Example: 不是 (bù + shì, 'to not be') becomes búshì [pu˧˥ʂɻ̩˥˩]
2. In other cases, 不 is pronounced with fourth tone. However, when used between words in an A-not-A question, it may become neutral in tone (e.g. 是不是 shìbushì).

For 一 (yī):

1. 一 is pronounced with second tone when followed by a fourth tone syllable.
  Example: 一定 (yī + dìng 'must') becomes yídìng [i˧˥tiŋ˥˩]
2. Before a first, second or third tone syllable, 一 is pronounced with fourth tone.
  Examples：一天 (yī + tiān 'one day') becomes yìtiān [i˥˩tʰjɛn˥], 一年 (yī + nián 'one year') becomes yìnián [i˥˩njɛn˧˥], 一起 (yī + qǐ 'together') becomes yìqǐ [i˥˩t͡ɕʰi˨˩˦].
3. When final, or when it comes at the end of a multi-syllable word (regardless of the first tone of the next word), 一 is pronounced with first tone. It also has first tone when used as an ordinal number (or part of one), and when it is immediately followed by any digit (including another 一; hence both syllables of the word 一一 yīyī and its compounds have first tone).
4. When 一 is used between two reduplicated words, it may become neutral in tone, e.g. kànyikàn ('to take a look of')

The numbers 七 (qī; 'seven') and 八 (bā; 'eight') sometimes display similar tonal behavior as 一 yī, but for most modern speakers they are always pronounced with first tone. All of these numbers, and 不 (bù), were historically Ru tones, and as noted above, that tone does not have predictable reflexes in modern Chinese; this may account for the variation in tone on these words.

=== Second and fourth tone change ===
In conversational speech, for the rising tone (tone 2) and falling tone (tone 4), there are some situations (based on which tones are used immediately before and after) where the pitch contours will change.

Tone 2 becomes higher and changes its direction, approaching the tone 1 pitch contour, when put between tone 1 or 2 and any other full tone.

Tone pattern	Nominal	Changed	Example words
2-2-4	˧˥ ˧˥ ˥˩	˧˥ ˥˦ ˥˩	yuáncáiliào (原材料)
2-2-3	˧˥ ˧˥ ˨˩	˧˥ ˥˦ ˨˩	Guómíndǎng (国民党; 國民黨)
2-2-2	˧˥ ˧˥ ˧˥	˧˥ ˥˦ ˧˥	xuélíngqián (学龄前; 學齡前)
2-2-1	˧˥ ˧˥ ˥	˧˥ ˥˦ ˥	liúxuéshēng (留学生; 留學生)
1-2-4	˥ ˧˥ ˥˩	˥ ˥˦ ˥˩	xīhóngshì (西红柿; 西紅柿)
1-2-3	˥ ˧˥ ˨˩	˥ ˥˦ ˨˩	shānhúdǎo (珊瑚岛; 珊瑚島)
1-2-2	˥ ˧˥ ˧˥	˥ ˥˦ ˧˥	zhuō mícáng (捉迷藏)
1-2-1	˥ ˧˥ ˥	˥ ˥˦ ˥	kēxuéjiā (科学家; 科學家)

Rising tone induced by the tone 3 sandhi also undergoes this transformation.

Tone pattern	Nominal	With sandhi	Changed	Example words
3-3-3	˨˩ ˨˩ ˨˩	˧˥ ˧˥ ˨˩	˧˥ ˥˦ ˨˩	pǎomǎchǎng (跑马场; 跑馬場)
2-3-3	˧˥ ˨˩ ˨˩	˧˥ ˧˥ ˨˩	˧˥ ˥˦ ˨˩	nóngchǎnpǐn (农产品; 農產品)
1-3-3	˥ ˨˩ ˨˩	˥ ˧˥ ˨˩	˥ ˥˦ ˨˩	kānshǒusǔo (看守所)

The status of this tone change is ambiguous, and some authors consider it a tone sandhi akin to the third tone sandhi. Yuen Ren Chao considered the changed tone 2 to be identical to tone 1, and Cao Wen treated it as tone 1 (before tones 1 or 4) or tone 4 (before tones 2 or 3). Both views are generalizations; the exact pitch contour of the changed tone 2 varies between mid-level ˧ in isolated words or at a slower speaking rate, and slightly falling high ˥ in a carrier sentence, at a faster speaking rate.

Tone 4 becomes lower and flatter, but still slightly falling, akin to Cantonese tone 3, when put between tone 3 or 4 and tone 1 or 4.

Tone pattern	Pitch (nominal)	Pitch (changed)	Example words
4-4-4	˥˩ ˥˩ ˥˩	˥˧ ˧ ˥˩	bìmùshì (闭幕式; 閉幕式)
4-4-1	˥˩ ˥˩ ˥	˥˧ ˧ ˥	jìsuànjī (计算机; 計算機)
3-4-4	˨˩ ˥˩ ˥˩	˨˩ ˧ ˥˩	gǎn xìngqù (感兴趣; 感興趣)
3-4-1	˨˩ ˥˩ ˥	˨˩ ˧ ˥	lǐbàitiān (礼拜天; 禮拜天)

Unlike with changed tone 2, the changed tone 4 pitch contour was only insignificantly influenced by the change of speaking rate, provided it was still at conversational speed. The resulting pitch contours, especially that of the changed tone 4, are not associated with a phonemic tone in Mandarin. In perceptual experiments, native Beijing Mandarin speakers could easily recognize the intended tone in the original word, but could not recognize it when it was stripped from the context by the adjacent syllables being replaced with white noise:

- Changed tone 2 was perceived as tone 1 in over 70% of responses
- Changed tone 4 was perceived as tone 1 in over 50% of responses
- Both of them were properly recognized in only 20% of responses

Besides the speech rate, the frequency of expression may also play a role in triggering this tone change. The changed tone 2 that normally required tone 1 or 2 to precede it is also said to occur in gòngchǎndǎng (共产党; 共產黨; 'communist party') in place of sandhi-tone 3, but it remains to be seen whether there are more examples with initial tone 4.

== Stress, rhythm and intonation ==
Stress within words (word stress) is not felt strongly by Chinese speakers, although contrastive stress is perceived easily (and functions much the same as in other languages). One of the reasons for the weaker perception of stress in Chinese may be that variations in the fundamental frequency of speech, which in many other languages serve as a cue for stress, are used in Chinese primarily to realize the tones. Nonetheless, there is still a link between stress and pitch – the range of pitch variation (for a given tone) has been observed to be greater on syllables that carry more stress.

As discussed above, weak syllables have neutral tone and are unstressed. Although this property can be contrastive, the contrast is interpreted by some as being primarily one of tone rather than stress. (Some linguists analyze Chinese as lacking word stress entirely.)

Apart from this contrast between full and weak syllables, some linguists have also identified differences in levels of stress among full syllables. In some descriptions, a multi-syllable word or compound (Note: The concepts of "word" and "compound" in Chinese are not easily defined.) is said to have the strongest stress on the final syllable, and the next strongest generally on the first syllable. Others, however, reject this analysis, noting that the apparent final-syllable stress can be ascribed purely to natural lengthening of the final syllable of a phrase, and disappears when a word is pronounced within a sentence rather than in isolation. San Duanmu takes this view, and concludes that it is the first syllable that is most strongly stressed. He also notes a tendency for Chinese to produce trochees – feet consisting of a stressed syllable followed by one (or in this case sometimes more) unstressed syllables. On this view, if the effect of "final-lengthening" is factored out:

- In words (compounds) of two syllables, the first syllable has the main stress, and the second lacks stress.
- In words (compounds) of three syllables, the first syllable is stressed most strongly, the second lacks stress, and the third may lack stress or have secondary stress.
- In words (compounds) of four syllables, the first syllable is stressed most strongly, the second lacks stress, and the third or fourth may lack stress or have secondary stress depending on the syntactic structure of the compound.

The positions described here as lacking stress are the positions in which weak (neutral-tone) syllables may occur, although full syllables frequently occur in these positions also.

There is a strong tendency for Chinese prose to employ four-syllable 'prosodic words' consisting of alternating stressed and unstressed syllables which are further subdivided into two trochaic feet. This structure, sometimes known as a 'four-character template' (四字格), is particularly prevalent in chengyu, which are classical idioms that are usually four characters in length. Statistical analysis of chengyu and other idiomatic phrases in vernacular texts indicates that the four-syllable prosodic word had become an important metrical consideration by the Wei and Jin dynasties (4th century CE).

This preference for trochaic feet may even result in polysyllabic words in which the foot and word (morpheme) boundaries do not align. For example, 'Czechoslovakia' is stressed as 捷克/斯洛/伐克 and 'Yugoslavia' is stressed as 南斯/拉夫, even though the morpheme boundaries are 捷克/斯洛伐克 'Czech[o]/slovak[ia]' and 南/斯拉夫 'South/slav[ia]', respectively. The preferred stress pattern also has a complex effect on tone sandhi for the various Chinese dialects.

This preference for a trochaic metrical structure is also cited as a reason for certain phenomena of word order variation within complex compounds, and for the strong tendency to use disyllabic words rather than monosyllables in certain positions. Many Chinese monosyllables have alternative disyllabic forms with virtually identical meaning – see Chinese grammar § Word formation.

Another function of voice pitch is to carry intonation. Chinese makes frequent use of particles to express certain meanings such as doubt, query, command, etc., reducing the need to use intonation. However, intonation is still present in Chinese (expressing meanings rather similarly as in standard English), although there are varying analyses of how it interacts with the lexical tones. Some linguists describe an additional intonation rise or fall at the end of the last syllable of an utterance, while others have found that the pitch of the entire utterance is raised or lowered according to the desired intonational meaning.
