= Prosodic unit =

Segment of speech that occurs with a single prosodic contour

Minor (foot) break Major (intonation) break

‖
- IPA number: 507, 508

Encoding
- Entity (decimal): &#124;&#8214;
- Unicode (hex): U+007C U+2016

In linguistics, a prosodic unit is a segment of speech that occurs with specific prosodic properties. These properties can be those of stress, intonation (a single pitch and rhythm contour), or tonal patterns.

Prosodic units occur at a hierarchy of levels, from the syllable, the metrical foot and phonological word to the intonational unit (IU) and to a complete utterance. However, the term is often restricted to intermediate levels which do not have a dedicated terminology. Prosodic units do not generally correspond to syntactic units, such as phrases and clauses; it is thought that they reflect different aspects of how speech is processed, with prosodic units being generated through on-line interaction and processing, and with morphosyntactic units being more automated.

== Defining characteristics ==
Prosodic units are characterized by several phonetic cues, such as pitch movement, pre-boundary lengthening, and pauses. Breathing, both inhalation and exhalation, only occurs at the boundaries (pausa) between higher units. Several short contours may carry an additional overall gradual decline in pitch and slowing of tempo; this larger unit is termed a declination unit (DU). At the boundaries (pauses) between declination units, the pitch and tempo reset; for this reason the final one of the shorter internal contours is said to have final prosody, whereas the others are said to have continuing prosody.

These two levels of the hierarchy may be schematized as follows:

Declination unit
continuing IU,	continuing IU,	continuing IU,	final IU.

== Transcription ==
In English orthography, a continuing prosodic boundary may be marked with a comma (assuming the writer is using commas to represent prosody rather than grammatical structure), while final prosodic boundaries may be marked with a full stop (period).

The International Phonetic Alphabet has symbols (single and double pipes) for "minor" and "major" prosodic breaks. Since there are more than two levels of prosodic units, the use of these symbols depends on the structure of the language and which information the transcriber is attempting to capture. Very often, each prosodic unit will be placed on a separate line of the transcription. Using the single and double pipes to mark continuing and final prosodic boundaries, we might have American English,

Jack,
preparing the way,
went on.
[ˈdʒæk | pɹəˌpɛəɹɪŋ ðə ˈweɪ | wɛnt ˈɑn ‖ ]

or French,

Jacques,
préparant le sol,
tomba.
[ˈʒak | pʁepaʁɑ̃ lɵ ˈsɔl | tɔ̃ˈba ‖ ]

The last syllable with a full vowel in a French prosodic unit is stressed, and the last stressed syllable in an English prosodic unit has primary stress. This shows that stress is not phonemic in French, and that the difference between primary and secondary stress is not phonemic in English; they are both elements of prosody rather than inherent in the words.

The pipe symbols – the vertical bars | and ‖ – used above are phonetic, and so will often disagree with English punctuation, which only partially correlates with prosody.

However, the pipes may also be used for metrical breaks – a single pipe being used to mark metrical feet, and a double pipe to mark both continuing and final prosody, as their alternate IPA descriptions "foot group" and "intonation group" suggest. In such usage, each foot group would include one and only one heavy syllable. In English, this would mean one and only one stressed syllable:

Jack,
preparing the way,
went on.
[ˈdʒæk ‖ pɹəˌpɛəɹɪŋ | ðə ˈweɪ ‖ wɛnt ˈɒn ‖ ]

In many tone languages with downdrift, such as Hausa, the single pipe ⟨|⟩ may be used to represent a minor prosodic break that does not interrupt the overall decline in pitch of the utterance, while ⟨‖⟩ marks either continuing or final prosody that creates a pitch reset. In such cases, some linguists use only the single pipe, with continuing and final prosody marked by a comma and period (full stop), respectively. The major break mark may also be doubled, ⟨‖‖⟩, for the most salient (full stop) breaks.

In transcriptions of non-tonal languages, the three symbols – pipe, comma, and period – may also be used, with the pipe representing a break more minor than the comma, the so-called list prosody often used to separate items when reading lists, spelling words, or giving out telephone numbers. In Eastern European tradition, the non-IPA dotted line ⟨⸽⟩ may be used for list prosody, and the non-IPA wavy line ⟨⸾⟩ for an unexpected interruption or breaking off of speech, which is indicated with a final hyphen when common punctuation is used.

== Cognitive implications ==
While each prosodic unit may carry a large information load in rehearsed speech, in extemporaneous conversation the amount of information is much more limited. There is seldom more than a single lexical noun in any one IU, and it is uncommon to have both a lexical noun and a lexical verb in the same IU. Indeed, many IUs are semantically empty, taken up by filler words such as um, well, or y'know. Chafe (1994) believes that this reflects the constraints of information processing by the brain during speech production, with chunks of speech (IUs) corresponding to chunks of cognitive output. It is also a possibility that the distribution of information across IUs is designed to maximize language comprehension by the other party.

== See also ==
- Phonological hierarchy
- Tone terracing
- Upstep

== General and cited references ==
- Chafe, Wallace (1994). Discourse, Consciousness, and Time: The flow and displacement of conscious experience in speaking and writing. University of Chicago Press.
- Dubois, John W., Susanna Cumming, Stephan Schuetze-Coburn, Danae Paolino eds. (1992). Discourse Transcription. Volume 4 of the Santa Barbara Papers in Linguistics.
