= Pitch reset =

Linguistic term

Reset (upstep)

ꜛ
- IPA number: 518

Encoding
- Entity (decimal): &#42779;
- Unicode (hex): U+A71B

In speech, phonetic pitch reset occurs at the boundaries (pausa) between prosodic units.

Over the course of such units, the median pitch of the voice declines from its initial value, sometimes reaching the lower end of the speaker's vocal range. Then, it must reset to a higher level if the person is to continue speaking. In non-tonal languages, the sudden increase in pitch is one of the principal auditory cues to the start of a new prosodic unit.

In register tone languages which experience discrete downdrift, pitch reset is required as the tones approach the lower end of the speaker's comfort range, and in those languages which experience tone terracing, it is in addition required in order to maintain the tonal distinctions of the language.

== See also ==
- Upstep
