= Tone terracing =

Where the high or mid tones shift downward in pitch after certain other tones

Tone terracing is a type of phonetic downdrift, where the high or mid tones, but not the low tone, shift downward in pitch (downstep) after certain other tones. The result is that a tone may be realized at a certain pitch over a short stretch of speech shifts downward, then continues at its new level and then shifts downward again until the end of the prosodic contour is reached, at which point the pitch resets. A graph of the change in pitch over time of a particular tone resembles a terrace.

Since the pitch of the low tone remains more-or-less constant at the lower end of the speaker's vocal range, and the other tones shift downward, the difference in their pitches narrows, eventually obscuring the tones altogether. Pitch reset is then required if the tone system is to continue to function.

Tone terracing is particularly common in the languages of West Africa, where typically only the low tone causes downstep. However, a somewhat more intricate system is found in the Twi language of Ghana. Twi has three phonemic tones: high, mid, and low. A word, and therefore a prosodic chunk of speech, may only start with a high tone or a low tone on its first syllable. As in many languages, a low tone starts out and remains at the bottom of the speaker's range. After a low tone, a subsequent high tone is downstepped. (A temporary exception occurs when a single low tone is found between two high tones. In this case the low tone is raised from its base value, but the second high tone is still downstepped, and subsequent low tones return to the base pitch.)

However, a phonetic downstep occurs between any two adjacent mid tones as well. In fact, a high tone is defined as any tone that is at the same pitch as a preceding high or mid tone; a mid tone will always be lower in pitch than a preceding high or mid tone. The result is that every instance of a mid or low tone shifts the upper end of the pitch range downward, until all pitches are reset at the end of the prosodic phrase.

Table 1. The phonetic terracing effect in Twi of a series of mid tones. (Twi constrains the first tone to be either high or low.)

(starting range)	syllable 1 :	syllable 2 :	syllable 3 :	syllable 4
(high)
(mid)		mid
			mid
				mid
(low)	low

Table 2. The phonetic terracing effect in Twi of an alternating series of high and mid tones.

(starting range)	syllable 1 :	syllable 2 :	syllable 3 :	syllable 4:	syllable 5
(high)	high
(mid)		mid	high
				mid	high
(low)

Table 3. The phonetic terracing effect in Twi of an alternating series of high and low tones.

(starting range)	syllable 1 :	syllable 2 :	syllable 3 :	syllable 4:	syllable 5:	syllable 6
(high)	high
			high
(mid)						high
		low
(low)				low	low

From tables 2 and 3, it can be imagined that the tone sequences high-low-high and high-mid-high may be difficult for a non-native speaker to distinguish.

== See also ==
- Japanese pitch accent

== Sources ==
- J.E. Redden and N. Owusu (1963, 1995). Twi Basic Course. Foreign Service Institute (Hippocrene reprint). ISBN 0-7818-0394-2
