= Upstep =

Raising of the pitch of a second, same-tone syllable

ꜛ◌

ꜞ◌

ꜟ◌
- IPA number: 518

Encoding
- Entity (decimal): &#42779;
- Unicode (hex): U+A71B

In linguistics, upstep is a phonemic or phonetic upward shift of tone between the syllables or words of a tonal language. It is best known in the tonal languages of Sub-Saharan Africa. Upstep is a much rarer phenomenon than its counterpart, downstep.

The symbol for upstep in the International Phonetic Alphabet is a superscript upward arrow [ꜛ] ([^{↑}]). However, it is common, especially in the early research, to find a superscript (or sometimes subscript) inverted exclamation mark [ꜞ] ([^{¡}]) or [_{¡}], because of typographical constraints.

Hausa has upstep because of the interaction of tones when they are placed in context:

[túránꜛtʃí nè]
It's English.

Upstep is superficially similar to pitch reset, which is nearly universal in the prosody of the world's languages. The most common prosodic contours occur in chunks with gradually declining pitch (here transcribed as a global fall, [↘]). Between such chunks, the pitch resets:

Been there. Done that.
[ꜛbɪn ðɛɹ↘ ꜛdɐn ðæt↘ ]

== Occurrence ==
Upstep occurs in various Sub-Saharan African languages, for example:

- Bokoto, an Ubangian language of the Central African Republic.
- Duma and Wandji, Bantu B languages of Gabon.
- Engenni, an Edoid language of Nigeria.
- Hausa, a Chadic language of Nigeria.
- Kirimi, a Bantu F language of Tanzania.
- Krachi, a Guang language of Ghana.
- Mankon, a Grassfields language of Cameroon.
- Mbelime, a Gur language of Benin.
- Mbugwe, a Bantu F language of Tanzania.
- Nupe, a Benue-Congo language of Nigeria.

Upstep also occurs in at least one Central American language:

- Peñoles Mixtec, an Oto-Manguean language of Mexico.

== See also ==
- Downstep, which is more commonly phonemic.
