= Pitch contour =

Perceived pitch over time

In linguistics, speech synthesis, and music, the pitch contour of a sound is a function or curve that tracks the perceived pitch of the sound over time. Pitch contour may include multiple sounds utilizing many pitches, and can relate the frequency function at one point in time to the frequency function at a later point.

It is fundamental to the linguistic concept of tone, where the pitch or change in pitch of a speech unit over time affects the semantic meaning of a sound. It also indicates intonation in pitch accent languages.

One of the primary challenges in speech synthesis technology, particularly for non-tonal languages, is to create a natural-sounding pitch contour for the utterance as a whole. Unnatural pitch contours result in synthesis that sounds "lifeless" or "emotionless" to human listeners, a feature that has become a stereotype of speech synthesis in popular culture.

In music, the pitch contour focuses on the relative change in pitch over time of a primary sequence of played notes. The same contour can be transposed without losing its essential relative qualities, such as sudden changes in pitch or a pitch that rises or falls over time. Often used in the analysis of post-tonal music, Michael Friedmann's methodology for analyzing pitch contour assigns numeric values to notate where each pitch falls in relation to the others within a musical line; the lowest pitch is assigned "0" and the highest pitch is assigned the value of n-1, in which n= the number of pitches within the segmentation. Therefore, a contour that follows the sequence of low, middle, high, would be labeled as contour classes 0, 1, and 2.

Pure tones have a clear pitch, but complex sounds such as speech and music typically have intense peaks at many different frequencies. Nevertheless, by establishing a fixed reference point in the frequency function of a complex sound, and then observing the movement of this reference point as the function translates, one can generate a meaningful pitch contour consistent with human experience.

For example, the vowel [e] has two primary formants, one peaking between 280 and 530 Hz and one between 1760 and 3500 Hz. When a person speaks a sentence involving multiple [e] sounds, the peaks will shift within these ranges, and the movement of the peaks between two instances establishes the difference in their values on the pitch contour.

== See also ==
- Prosodic unit

== Music bibliography ==
- Cogan and Escot (1976). Sonic Design: The Nature of Sound and Music. (Englewood Cliffs, NJ: Prentice-Hall).
- Friedmann, "A Methodology for the Discussion of Contour: Its Application to Schoenberg's Music," Journal of Music Theory 29 (1985): 223–48.
- Morris, Composition with Pitch-Classes: A Theory of Compositional Design (New Haven and London: Yale University Press, 1987)
- Polansky, "Morphological Metrics: An Introduction to a Theory of Formal Distances" in Proceedings of the International Computer Music Conference (San Francisco: Computer Music Association, 1987).
- Polansky, Larry; Richard Bassein (1992). "Possible and Impossible Melody: Some Formal Aspects of Contour", Journal of Music Theory, Vol. 36, No. 2. (Autumn, 1992), pp. 259–284.

=== Ethnomusicology ===
- Mieczyslaw Kolinski, "The Structure of Melodic Movement: A New Method of Analysis," Studies in Ethnomusicology 2 (1965): 96–120
- Charles R. Adams, "Melodic Contour Typology," Ethnomusicology 20 (1976): 179- 215.
- Charles Seeger, "On the Moods of a Music-Logic." Journal of the American Musicology Society 8 (1960): 224–61.
- Elizabeth West Marvin, "A Generalization of Contour Theory to Diverse Musical Spaces: Analytical Applications to the Music of Dallapiccola and Stockhausen" in Musical Pluralism: Aspects of Aesthetics and Structure Since 1945 (forthcoming). Contains review of these and earlier articles.
