= Tone (linguistics) =

Use of pitch to distinguish lexical or grammatical meaning

Six tones of Vietnamese

The syllable ma with each of the primary tones in Standard Mandarin Chinese

In linguistics, tone is a language's use of pitch, pitch contour, pitch register, or a combination of these to distinguish words' meanings. A particular tone is a pitch and its movement: whether held steady, or sliding upwards or downwards, or any complex combination of these. Simply worded, in certain languages, the tone of a given word or syllable is used to differentiate or inflect words. Some scholars also classify phonation, or changes in vocal cord vibrations, under the umbrella of tone.

All spoken languages use pitch to express emotion and to convey emphasis, contrast, and other such features in what is called intonation. However, certain languages—tonal languages—additionally possess what linguists call tones: using pitch and changes-in-pitch specifically to distinguish words from each other, serving the same purpose that consonant and vowel sounds do in all languages. The basic distinctive tonal patterns of such a language are sometimes called tonemes, by analogy with phonemes. Tonal languages are common in East and Southeast Asia, such as in the various Thai and Chinese languages; most languages of Africa, such as in Hausa and Yoruba; and among some indigenous people of the Americas, such as in Navajo and Mexico's Oto-Manguean languages.

Tonal languages are classified separately from pitch-accent languages, such as Japanese, Western South Slavic languages, Baltic languages, and many Scandinavian language varieties, in that word-distinguishing pitch patterns affect nearly every syllable of a word in tonal languages but usually only one prominent syllable in pitch-accent languages.

== Mechanics ==
Most languages use pitch as intonation to convey prosody and pragmatics, but this does not make them tonal languages. In tonal languages, each syllable has an inherent pitch contour, and thus minimal pairs (or larger minimal sets) exist between syllables with the same segmental features (consonants and vowels) but different tones. Vietnamese and Chinese have heavily studied tone systems, as well as amongst their various dialects.

Below is a table of the six Vietnamese tones and their corresponding tone accent or diacritics:

Vietnamese tones ngang ("flat"), huyền ("deep" or "falling"), sắc ("sharp" or "rising"), nặng ("heavy" or "down"), hỏi ("asking"), and ngã ("tumbling")

Tone name	Tone ID	Vni/telex/Viqr	Description	Chao tone contour		Diacritic	Example
Tone name	Tone ID	Vni/telex/Viqr	Description	Northern	Southern	Diacritic	Example
ngang "flat"	A1	[default]	mid level	˧ (33) or ˦ (44)		◌	ma
huyền "deep"	A2	2 / f / `	low falling (breathy)	˧˩ (31) or ˨˩ (21)		◌̀	mà
sắc "sharp"	B1	1 / s / '	mid rising, tense	˧˥ (35) or ˦˥ (45)		◌́	má
nặng "heavy"	B2	5 / j / .	mid falling, glottalized, heavy	˧ˀ˨ʔ (3ˀ2ʔ) or ˧ˀ˩ʔ (3ˀ1ʔ)	˩˨ (12) or ˨˩˨ (212)	़	mạ
hỏi "asking"	C1	3 / r / ?	mid falling(-rising), emphasis	˧˩˧ (313) or ˧˨˧ (323) or ˧˩ (31)	˧˨˦ (324) or ˨˩˦ (214)	◌̉	mả
ngã "tumbling"	C2	4 / x / ~	mid rising, glottalized	˧ˀ˥ (3ˀ5) or ˦ˀ˥ (4ˀ5)	˧˨˦ (324) or ˨˩˦ (214)	◌̃	mã

Mandarin Chinese, which has five tones, transcribed by letters with diacritics over vowels:

The tone contours of Standard Chinese. In the convention for Chinese, 1 is low and 5 is high. The corresponding tone letters are ˥ ˧˥ ˨˩˦ ˥˩.

1. A high level tone: /á/ (pinyin ⟨ā⟩)
2. A tone starting with mid pitch and rising to a high pitch: /ǎ/ (pinyin ⟨á⟩)
3. A low tone with a slight fall (if there is no following syllable, it may start with a dip then rise to a high pitch): /à/ (pinyin ⟨ǎ⟩)
4. A short, sharply falling tone, starting high and falling to the bottom of the speaker's vocal range: /â/ (pinyin ⟨à⟩)
5. A neutral tone, with no specific contour, used on weak syllables; its pitch depends chiefly on the tone of the preceding syllable.

These tones combine with a syllable such as ma to produce different words. A minimal set based on ma are, in pinyin transcription:

1. mā (媽/妈) 'mother'
2. má (麻/麻) 'hemp'
3. mǎ (馬/马) 'horse'
4. mà (罵/骂) 'scold'
5. ma (嗎/吗) (an interrogative particle)

These may be combined into a tongue-twister:

Simplified: 妈妈骂马的麻吗?
Traditional: 媽媽罵馬的麻嗎?
Pinyin: Māma mà mǎde má ma?
IPA /máma mâ màtə mǎ ma/
Translation: 'Is mom scolding the horse's hemp?'

See also one-syllable article.

A well-known tongue-twister in Standard Thai is:

ไหมใหม่ไหม้มั้ย
IPA: /mǎi̯ mài̯ mâi̯ mái̯/
Translation: 'Does new silk burn?' (Note: Tones change over time, but may retain their original spelling. The Thai spelling of the final word in the tongue-twister, ⟨ไหม⟩, indicates a rising tone, but the word is now commonly pronounced with a high tone. Therefore a new spelling, มั้ย, is occasionally seen in informal writing.)

A Vietnamese tongue twister:

Bấy nay bây bầy bảy bẫy bậy.
IPA: [ɓʌ̌i̯ nai̯ ɓʌi̯ ɓʌ̂i̯ ɓa᷉i̯ ɓʌ̌ˀi̯ ɓʌ̂ˀi̯]
Translation: 'Recently, you've been setting up the seven traps incorrectly.'

A Cantonese tongue twister:

一人因一日引一刃一印而忍
Jyutping: jat^{1} jan^{4} jan^{1} jat^{1} jat^{6} jan^{5} jat^{1} jan^{6} jat^{1} jan^{3} ji^{4} jan^{2}
IPA: [jɐ́t̚ jɐ̏n jɐ́n jɐ́t̚ jɐ̀t̚ jɐ᷅n jɐ́t̚ jɐ̀n jɐ́t̚ jɐn jȉː jɐ᷄n]
Translation: 'One person endures a day with one knife and one print.'

Tone is most frequently manifested on vowels, but in most tonal languages where voiced syllabic consonants occur they will bear tone as well. This is especially common with syllabic nasals, for example in many Bantu and Kru languages, but also occurs in Serbo-Croatian. It is also possible for lexically contrastive pitch (or tone) to span entire words or morphemes instead of manifesting on the syllable nucleus (vowels), which is the case in Punjabi.

Tones can interact in complex ways through a process known as tone sandhi.

=== Phonation ===
In a number of East Asian languages, tonal differences are closely intertwined with phonation differences. In Vietnamese, for example, the ngã and sắc tones are both high-rising but the former is distinguished by having glottalization in the middle. Similarly, the nặng and huyền tones are both low-falling, but the nặng tone is shorter and pronounced with creaky voice at the end, while the huyền tone is longer and often has breathy voice. In some languages, such as Burmese, pitch and phonation are so closely intertwined that the two are combined in a single phonological system, where neither can be considered without the other. The distinctions of such systems are termed registers. The tone register here should not be confused with register tone described in the next section.

==== Phonation type ====
Gordon and Ladefoged established a continuum of phonation, where several types can be identified.

==== Relationship with tone ====
Kuang identified two types of phonation: pitch-dependent and pitch-independent. Contrast of tones has long been thought of as differences in pitch height. However, several studies pointed out that tone is actually multidimensional. Contour, duration, and phonation may all contribute to the differentiation of tones. Investigations from the 2010s using perceptual experiments seem to suggest phonation counts as a perceptual cue.

=== Tone and pitch accent ===
Many languages use tone in a more limited way. In Japanese, fewer than half of the words have a drop in pitch; words contrast according to which syllable this drop follows. Such minimal systems are sometimes called pitch accent since they are reminiscent of stress accent languages, which typically allow one principal stressed syllable per word. However, there is debate over the definition of pitch accent and whether a coherent definition is even possible.

=== Tone and intonation ===
Both lexical or grammatical tone and prosodic intonation are cued by changes in pitch, as well as sometimes by changes in phonation. Lexical tone coexists with intonation, with the lexical changes of pitch like waves superimposed on larger swells. For example, Luksaneeyanawin (1993) describes three intonational patterns in Thai: falling (with semantics of "finality, closedness, and definiteness"), rising ("non-finality, openness and non-definiteness") and "convoluted" (contrariness, conflict and emphasis). The phonetic realization of these intonational patterns superimposed on the five lexical tones of Thai (in citation form) are as follows:

Tone plus intonation in Thai
	Falling intonation	Rising intonation	Convoluted intonation
High level tone	˦˥˦	˥	˦˥˨
Mid level tone	˧˨	˦	˧˦˨
Low level tone	˨˩	˧	˧˧˦
Falling tone	˦˧˨, ˦˦˨	˦˦˧, ˥˥˦	˦˥˨
Rising tone	˩˩˦	˧˧˦	˨˩˦

With convoluted intonation, it appears that high and falling tone conflate, while the low tone with convoluted intonation has the same contour as rising tone with rising intonation.

=== Tonal polarity ===
Languages with simple tone systems or pitch accent may have one or two syllables specified for tone, with the rest of the word taking a default tone. Such languages differ in which tone is marked and which is the default. In Navajo, for example, syllables have a low tone by default, whereas marked syllables have high tone. In the related language Sekani, however, the default is high tone, and marked syllables have low tone. There are parallels with stress: English stressed syllables have a higher pitch than unstressed syllables.

== Types ==
=== Register tones and contour tones ===
In many Bantu languages, tones are distinguished by their pitch level relative to each other. In multisyllable words, a single tone may be carried by the entire word rather than a different tone on each syllable. Often, grammatical information, such as past versus present, "I" versus "you", or positive versus negative, is conveyed solely by tone.

In the most widely spoken tonal language, Mandarin Chinese, tones are distinguished by their distinctive shape, known as contour, with each tone having a different internal pattern of rising and falling pitch. Many words, especially monosyllabic ones, are differentiated solely by tone. In a multisyllabic word, each syllable often carries its own tone. Unlike in Bantu systems, tone plays little role in the grammar of modern standard Chinese, though the tones descend from features in Old Chinese that had morphological significance (such as changing a verb to a noun or vice versa).

Most tonal languages have a combination of register and contour tones. Tone is typical of languages including Kra–Dai, Vietic, Sino-Tibetan, Afroasiatic, Khoisan, Niger-Congo and Nilo-Saharan languages. Most tonal languages combine both register and contour tones, such as Cantonese, which produces three varieties of contour tone at three different pitch levels, and the Omotic (Afroasiatic) language Bench, which employs five level tones and one or two rising tones across levels.

Most varieties of Chinese use contour tones, where the distinguishing feature of the tones are their shifts in pitch (that is, the pitch is a contour), such as rising, falling, dipping, or level. Most Bantu languages (except northwestern Bantu) on the other hand, have simpler tone systems usually with high, low and one or two contour tone (usually in long vowels). In such systems there is a default tone, usually low in a two-tone system or mid in a three-tone system, that is more common and less salient than other tones. There are also languages that combine relative-pitch and contour tones, such as many Kru languages and other Niger-Congo languages of West Africa.

Falling tones tend to fall further than rising tones rise; high–low tones are common, whereas low–high tones are quite rare. A language with contour tones will also generally have as many or more falling tones than rising tones. However, exceptions are not unheard of; Mpi, for example, has three level and three rising tones, but no falling tones.

=== Word tones and syllable tones ===
Another difference between tonal languages is whether the tones apply independently to each syllable or to the word as a whole. In Cantonese, Thai, and Kru languages, each syllable may have a tone, whereas in Shanghainese, Swedish, Norwegian and many Bantu languages, the contour of each tone operates at the word level. That is, a trisyllabic word in a three-tone syllable-tone language has many more tonal possibilities (3 × 3 × 3 = 27) than a monosyllabic word (3), but there is no such difference in a word-tone language. For example, Shanghainese has two contrastive (phonemic) tones no matter how many syllables are in a word. Many languages described as having pitch accent are word-tone languages.

Tone sandhi is an intermediate situation, as tones are carried by individual syllables, but affect each other so that they are not independent of each other. For example, a number of Mandarin Chinese suffixes and grammatical particles have what is called (when describing Mandarin Chinese) a "neutral" tone, which has no independent existence. If a syllable with a neutral tone is added to a syllable with a full tone, the pitch contour of the resulting word is entirely determined by that other syllable:

Realization of neutral tones in Mandarin Chinese
Tone in isolation	Tone pattern with added neutral tone	Example	Pinyin	English meaning
high ˥	˥꜋	玻璃	bōli	glass
rising ˧˥	˧˥꜊	伯伯	bóbo	elder uncle
dipping ˨˩˦	˨˩꜉	喇叭	lǎba	horn
falling ˥˩	˥˩꜌	兔子	tùzi	rabbit

After high level and high rising tones, the neutral syllable has an independent pitch that looks like a mid-register tone – the default tone in most register-tone languages. However, after a falling tone it takes on a low pitch; the contour tone remains on the first syllable, but the pitch of the second syllable matches where the contour leaves off. And after a low-dipping tone, the contour spreads to the second syllable: the contour remains the same (˨˩˦) whether the word has one syllable or two. In other words, the tone is now the property of the word, not the syllable. Shanghainese has taken this pattern to its extreme, as the pitches of all syllables are determined by the tone before them, so that only the tone of the initial syllable of a word is distinctive.

=== Lexical tones and grammatical tones ===
Lexical tones are used to distinguish lexical meanings. Grammatical tones, on the other hand, change the grammatical categories. To some authors, the term includes both inflectional and derivational morphology. Tian described a grammatical tone, the induced creaky tone, in Burmese.

=== Number of tones ===
Languages may distinguish up to five levels of pitch, though the Chori language of Nigeria is described as distinguishing six surface tone registers. Since tone contours may involve up to two shifts in pitch, there are theoretically 5 × 5 × 5 = 125 distinct tones for a language with five registers. However, the most that are actually used in a language is a tenth of that number.

Several Kam–Sui languages of southern China have nine contrastive tones, including contour tones. For example, the Kam language has 9 tones: 3 more-or-less fixed tones (high, mid and low); 4 unidirectional tones (high and low rising, high and low falling); and 2 bidirectional tones (dipping and peaking). This assumes that checked syllables are not counted as having additional tones, as they traditionally are in China. For example, in the traditional reckoning, the Kam language has 15 tones, but 6 occur only in syllables closed with the voiceless stop consonants /p/, /t/ or /k/ and the other 9 occur only in syllables not ending in one of these sounds.

Preliminary work on the Wobe language (part of the Wee continuum) of Liberia and Côte d'Ivoire, the Ticuna language of the Amazon and the Chatino languages of southern Mexico suggests that some dialects may distinguish as many as fourteen tones or more. The Guere language, Dan language and Mano language of Liberia and Ivory Coast have around 10 tones, give or take. The Oto-Manguean languages of Mexico have a huge number of tones as well. The most complex tonal systems are actually found in Africa and the Americas, not East Asia.

== Tonal change ==
=== Tone terracing ===
Tones are realized as pitch only in a relative sense. "High tone" and "low tone" are only meaningful relative to the speaker's vocal range and in comparing one syllable to the next, rather than as a contrast of absolute pitch such as one finds in music. As a result, when one combines tone with sentence prosody, the absolute pitch of a high tone at the end of a prosodic unit may be lower than that of a low tone at the beginning of the unit, because of the universal tendency (in both tonal and non-tonal languages) for pitch to decrease with time in a process called downdrift.

Tones may affect each other just as consonants and vowels do. In many register-tone languages, low tones may cause a downstep in following high or mid tones; the effect is such that even while the low tones remain at the lower end of the speaker's vocal range (which is itself descending due to downdrift), the high tones drop incrementally like steps in a stairway or terraced rice fields, until finally the tones merge and the system has to be reset. This effect is called tone terracing.

Sometimes a tone may remain as the sole realization of a grammatical particle after the original consonant and vowel disappear, so it can only be heard by its effect on other tones. It may cause downstep, or it may combine with other tones to form contours. These are called floating tones.

=== Tone sandhi ===
In many contour-tone languages, one tone may affect the shape of an adjacent tone. The affected tone may become something new, a tone that only occurs in such situations, or it may be changed into a different existing tone. This is called tone sandhi. In Mandarin Chinese, for example, a dipping tone between two other tones is reduced to a simple low tone, which otherwise does not occur in Mandarin Chinese, whereas if two dipping tones occur in a row, the first becomes a rising tone, indistinguishable from other rising tones in the language. For example, the words 很 [xɤn˨˩˦] ('very') and 好 [xaʊ˨˩˦] ('good') produce the phrase 很好 [xɤn˧˥ xaʊ˨˩˦] ('very good'). The two transcriptions may be conflated with reversed tone letters as [xɤn˨˩˦꜔꜒xaʊ˨˩˦].

==== Right- and left-dominant sandhi ====
Tone sandhi in Sinitic languages can be classified with a left-dominant or right-dominant system. In a language of the right-dominant system, the right-most syllable of a word retains its citation tone (i.e., the tone in its isolation form). All the other syllables of the word must take their sandhi form. Taiwanese Southern Min is known for its complex sandhi system. Example: from 鹹 kiam^{5} 'salty', 酸 sng^{1} 'sour' and 甜 tinn^{1} 'sweet' is the word 鹹酸甜 kiam^{5–7} sng^{1–7} tinn^{1}, also transcribed kiam_{7} sng_{7} tinn^{1} 'candied fruit'. In this example, only the last syllable remains unchanged.

=== Tone change ===
Tone change must be distinguished from tone sandhi. Tone sandhi is a compulsory change that occurs when certain tones are juxtaposed. Tone change, however, is a morphologically conditioned alternation and is used as an inflectional or a derivational strategy. Lien indicated that causative verbs in modern Southern Min are expressed with tonal alternation, and that tonal alternation may come from earlier affixes. Examples: 長 tng^{5} 'long' vs. tng^{2} 'grow'; 斷 tng^{7} 'break' vs. tng^{2} 'cause to break'. Also, 毒 in Taiwanese Southern Min has two pronunciations: to̍k (entering tone) means 'poison' or 'poisonous', while thāu (departing tone) means 'to kill with poison'. The same usage can be found in Min, Yue, and Hakka.

== Uses of tone ==
In East Asia, tone is typically lexical. That is, tone is used to distinguish words which would otherwise be homonyms. This is characteristic of heavily tonal languages such as Chinese, Vietnamese, Thai, and Hmong.

However, in many African languages, especially in the Niger–Congo family, tone can be both lexical and grammatical. In the Kru languages, a combination of these patterns is found: nouns tend to have complex tone systems but are not much affected by grammatical inflections, whereas verbs tend to have simple tone systems, which are inflected to indicate tense and mood, person, and polarity, so that tone may be the only distinguishing feature between "you went" and "I won't go".

In Yoruba, much of the lexical and grammatical information is carried by tone. In languages of West Africa such as Yoruba, people may even communicate with so-called "talking drums", which are modulated to imitate the tones of the language, or by whistling the tones of speech.

Note that tonal languages are not distributed evenly across the same range as non-tonal languages. Instead, the majority of tone languages belong to the Niger-Congo, Sino-Tibetan and Vietic groups, which are then composed by a large majority of tone languages and dominate a single region. Only in limited locations (South Africa, New Guinea, Mexico, Brazil and a few others) do tone languages occur as individual members or small clusters within a non-tone dominated area. In some locations, like Central America, it may represent no more than an incidental effect of which languages were included when one examines the distribution; for groups like Khoi-San in Southern Africa and Papuan languages, whole families of languages possess tonality but simply have relatively few members, and for some North American tone languages, multiple independent origins are suspected.

If generally considering only complex-tone vs. no-tone, it might be concluded that tone is almost always an ancient feature within a language family that is highly conserved among members. However, when considered in addition to "simple" tone systems that include only two tones, tone, as a whole, appears to be more labile, appearing several times within Indo-European languages, several times in American languages, and several times in Papuan families. That may indicate that rather than a trait unique to some language families, tone is a latent feature of most language families that may more easily arise and disappear as languages change over time.

A 2015 study by Caleb Everett argued that tonal languages are more common in hot and humid climates, which make them easier to pronounce, even when considering familial relationships. If the conclusions of Everett's work are sound, this is perhaps the first known case of influence of the environment on the structure of the languages spoken in it. The proposed relationship between climate and tone is controversial, and logical and statistical issues have been raised by various scholars.

== Tone and inflection ==
Tone has long been viewed as a phonological system. It was not until recent years that tone was found to play a role in inflectional morphology. Palancar and Léonard (2016) provided an example with Tlatepuzco Chinantec (an Oto-Manguean language spoken in Southern Mexico), where tones are able to distinguish mood, person, and number:

Forms of 'bend' in Tlatepuzco Chinantec
	1 SG	1 PL	2	3
Completive	húʔ˩	húʔ˩˥	húʔ˩	húʔ˧
Incompletive	húʔ˩˧	húʔ˩˧	húʔ˩˧	húʔ˧
Irrealis	húʔ˩˥	húʔ˩˥	húʔ˩˥	húʔ˧

In Iau (the most tonally complex Lakes Plain language, predominantly monosyllabic), nouns have an inherent tone (e.g. be˧ 'fire' but be˦˧ 'flower'), but verbs don't have any inherent tone. For verbs, a tone is used to mark aspect. The first work that mentioned this was published in 1986. Example paradigms:

Aspects in Iau
Tone	Aspect	ba 'come'	tai 'moving s.t. toward'	da 'locate s.t. inside'
tone 2	totality of action, punctual	ba˦ 'came'	tai˦ 'pulled'	da˦ 'ate, put it in (stomach)'
tone 3	resultative durative	ba˧ 'has come'	tai˧ 'has been pulled off'	da˧ 'has been loaded onto s.t.'
tone 21	totality of action, incomplete	ba˦˥ 'might come'	tai˦˥ 'might pull'	
tone 43	resultative punctual	ba˨˧ 'came to get'	tai˨˧ 'land on s.t.'	da˨˧ 'dip into water, wash s.t.'
tone 24	telic punctual	ba˦˨ 'came to end'	tai˦˨ 'fell to ground'	da˦˨ 'eaten it all up'
tone 23	telic, incomplete	ba˦˧ 'still coming'	tai˦˧ 'still falling'	da˦˧ 'still eating it up'
tone 34	totality of action, durative	ba˧˨ 'be coming'	tai˧˨ 'be pulling'	
tone 243	telic durative	ba˦˨˧ 'sticking to'	tai˦˨˧ 'be falling'	
			tai˦˥–˧˨ 'pull on s.t., shake hands'	
			tai˦˥–˧ 'have pulled s.t., shook hands'	

Tones are used to differentiate cases as well, as in Maasai language (a Nilo-Saharan language spoken in Kenya and Tanzania):

Case difference in Maasai
gloss	Nominative	Accusative
'head'	èlʊ̀kʊ̀nyá	èlʊ́kʊ́nyá
'rat'	èndérònì	èndèrónì

Certain varieties of Chinese are known to express meaning by means of tone change although further investigations are required. Examples from two Yue dialects spoken in Guangdong Province are shown below. In Taishan, tone change indicates the grammatical number of personal pronouns. In Zhongshan, perfective verbs are marked with tone change.

- Taishan

ngwoi˧	'I' (singular)
ngwoi˨	'we' (plural)

- Zhongshan

hy˨	'go'
hy˧˥	'gone' (perfective)

The following table compares the personal pronouns of Sixian dialect (a dialect of Taiwanese Hakka) with Zaiwa and Jingpho (both Tibeto-Burman languages spoken in Yunnan and Burma). From this table, we find the distinction between nominative, genitive, and accusative is marked by tone change and sound alternation.

Comparison of personal pronouns
	Sixian	Zaiwa	Jingpho
1 Nom	ŋai˩	ŋo˥˩	ŋai˧
1 Gen	ŋa˨˦ or ŋai˩ ke˥	ŋa˥	ŋjeʔ˥
1 Acc	ŋai˩	ŋo˧˩	ŋai˧
2 Nom	ŋ̍˩	naŋ˥˩	naŋ˧
2 Gen	ŋia˨˦ or ŋ̍˩ ke˥	naŋ˥	naʔ˥
2 Acc	ŋ̍˩	naŋ˧˩	naŋ˧
3 Nom	ki˩	jaŋ˧˩	khji˧
3 Gen	kia˨˦ or ki˩ ke˥	jaŋ˥˩	khjiʔ˥
3 Acc	ki˩	jaŋ˧˩	khji˧

== Phonetic notation ==
There are several approaches to notating tones in the description of a language. A fundamental difference is between phonemic and phonetic transcription.

A phonemic notation will typically lack any consideration of the actual phonetic values of the tones. Such notations are especially common when comparing dialects with wildly different phonetic realizations of what are historically the same set of tones. In Chinese, for example, the "four tones" may be assigned numbers, such as ① to ④ or — after the historical tone split that affected all Chinese languages to at least some extent — ① to ⑧ (with odd numbers for the yin tones and even numbers for the yang). In traditional Chinese notation, the equivalent diacritics ⟨꜀◌ ꜂◌ ◌꜄ ◌꜆⟩ are attached to the Chinese character, marking the same distinctions, plus underlined ⟨꜁◌ ꜃◌ ◌꜅ ◌꜇⟩ for the yang tones where a split has occurred. If further splits occurred in some language or dialect, the results may be numbered '4a' and '4b' or something similar. Among the Kra-Dai languages, tones are typically assigned the letters A through D, or, after a historical tone split similar to what occurred in Chinese, A1 to D1 and A2 to D2; see Proto-Tai language. With such a system, it can be seen which words in two languages have the same historical tone (say tone ③) even though they no longer sound anything alike.

Also phonemic are upstep and downstep, which are indicated by the IPA diacritics ⟨ꜛ⟩ and ⟨ꜜ⟩, respectively, or by the typographic substitutes ⟨ꜞ⟩ and ⟨ꜝ⟩, respectively. Upstep and downstep affect the tones within a language as it is being spoken, typically due to grammatical inflection or when certain tones are brought together. (For example, a high tone may be stepped down when it occurs after a low tone, compared to the pitch it would have after a mid tone or another high tone.)

Phonetic notation records the actual relative pitch of the tones. Since tones tend to vary over time periods as short as centuries, this means that the historical connections among the tones of two language varieties will generally be lost by such notation, even if they are dialects of the same language.

- The easiest notation from a typographical perspective — but one that is internationally ambiguous — is a numbering system, with the pitch levels assigned digits and each tone transcribed as a digit (or as a sequence of digits if a contour tone). Such systems tend to be idiosyncratic (high tone may be assigned the digit 1, 3, or 5, for example) and have therefore not been adopted for the International Phonetic Alphabet. For instance, high tone is conventionally written with a 1 and low tone with a 4 or 5 when transcribing the Kru languages of Liberia, but with 1 for low and 5 for high for the Omotic languages of Ethiopia. The tone ⟨53⟩ in a Kru language is thus the same pitch contour as one written ⟨35⟩ in an Omotic language. Pitch value 1 may be distinguished from tone number 1 by doubling it or making it superscript or both.
- For simple tone systems, a series of diacritics such as ⟨ó⟩ for high tone and ⟨ò⟩ for low tone may be practical. This has been adopted by the IPA, but is not easy to adapt to complex contour tone systems (see under Chinese below for one workaround). The five IPA diacritics for level tones are ⟨ő ó ō ò ȍ⟩, with doubled high and low diacritics for extra high and extra low (or 'top' and 'bottom'). The diacritics combine to form contour tones, of which ⟨ô ǒ o᷄ o᷅ o᷆ o᷇ o᷈ o᷉⟩ have Unicode font support (support for additional combinations is sparse). Sometimes, a non-IPA vertical diacritic is seen for a second, higher mid tone, ⟨o̍⟩, so a language with four or six level tones may be transcribed ⟨ó o̍ ō ò⟩ or ⟨ő ó o̍ ō ò ȍ⟩. For the Chinantecan languages of Mexico, the diacritics ⟨◌ꜗ ◌ꜘ ◌ꜙ ◌ꜚ⟩ have been used, but they are a local convention not accepted by the IPA.
- A retired IPA system, sometimes still encountered, traces the shape of the tone (the pitch trace) before the syllable, where a stress mark would go. Thus level, rising, falling, peaking and dipping tones on [o] are ⟨ˉo ˊo ˋo ˆo ˇo⟩; these are read as high tones when contrasted with the low tones ⟨ˍo ˏo ˎo ꞈo ˬo⟩ or with mid tones, which are poorly supported by Unicode (e.g. falling ⟨˴o⟩). For a concrete example, when the diacritics are applied to the Hanyu Pinyin syllable [sa] used in Standard Chinese, it becomes easier to identify more specific rising and falling tones: [ˆsa] (high peaking tone), [ˍsa] (low level tone), etc. This system was used in combination with stress marks to indicate intonation as well, as in English [ˈgʊd ˌɑːftə`nuːn] (now transcribed [ˈgʊd ˌɑːftə↘nuːn]).
- The most flexible system, based on the previous spacing diacritics but with the addition of a stem (like the staff of musical notation), is that of the IPA-adopted Chao tone letters, which are iconic schematics of the pitch trace of the tone in question. Because musical staff notation is international, there is no international ambiguity with the Chao/IPA tone letters: a line at the top of the staff is high tone, a line at the bottom is low tone, and the shape of the line is a schematic of the contour of the tone (as visible in a pitch trace). They are most commonly used for complex contour systems, such as those of the languages of Liberia and southern China.
  The Chao tone letters have two variants. The left-stem letters, ⟨꜒ ꜓ ꜔ ꜕ ꜖⟩, are used for tone sandhi. These are especially important for the Min Chinese languages. For example, a word may be pronounced /ɕim˥˧/ in isolation, but in a compound the tone will shift to /ɕim˦mĩʔ˧˨/. This can be notated morphophonemically as ⟨//ɕim˥˧꜓mĩʔ˧˨//⟩, where the back-to-front tone letters simultaneously show the underlying tone and the value in this word. Using the local (and internationally ambiguous) non-IPA numbering system, the compound may be written ⟨//ɕim⁵³⁻⁴⁴ mĩʔ³²//⟩. Left-stem letters may also be combined to form contour tones.
  The second Chao letter variant are the dotted tone letters ⟨꜈ ꜉ ꜊ ꜋ ꜌⟩, which are used to indicate the pitch of neutral tones. These are phonemically null, and may be indicated with the digit '0' in a numbering system, but take specific pitches depending on the preceding phonemic tone. When combined with tone sandhi, the left-stem dotted tone letters ⟨꜍ ꜎ ꜏ ꜐ ꜑⟩ are seen.

Conventions for five-pitch transcription
Name	Top tone (extra-high)	High tone	High-mid tone	Mid tone	Low-mid tone	Low tone	Bottom tone (extra-low)
IPA tone diacritic	◌̋	◌́		◌̄		◌̀	◌̏
IPA chart tone letter		◌˥	◌˦	◌˧	◌˨	◌˩	
Neutral tone letter		◌꜈	◌꜉	◌꜊	◌꜋	◌꜌	
Sandhi tone letter (Note: These extended Chao tone letters were accepted at the IPA Kiel convention, and are often used in conjunction with the chart letters.)		◌꜒	◌꜓	◌꜔	◌꜕	◌꜖	
Sandhi neutral tone letter		◌꜍	◌꜎	◌꜏	◌꜐	◌꜑	

Name	Falling tone	High falling tone	Low falling tone
IPA tone diacritic	◌̂	◌᷇	◌᷆
IPA tone letters	˥˩, ˥˨, ˥˧, ˥˦, ˦˩, ˦˨, ˦˧, ˧˩, ˧˨, ˨˩	◌˥˧, ◌˥˦, ◌˦˧, &c.	◌˧˩, ◌˧˨, ◌˨˩, &c.

Name	Rising tone	High rising tone	Low rising tone
IPA tone diacritic	◌̌	◌᷄	◌᷅
IPA tone letters	˩˥, ˩˦, ˩˧, ˩˨, ˨˥, ˨˦, ˨˧, ˧˥, ˧˦, ˦˥	◌˧˥, ◌˦˥, ◌˧˦, &c.	◌˩˧, ◌˨˧, ◌˩˨, &c.

Name	Dipping tone (falling–rising)	Peaking tone (rising–falling)
IPA tone diacritic	◌᷉	◌᷈
IPA tone letters	(various): ˨˩˨,˨˩˧,˨˩˦,˨˩˥, ˧˩˨,˧˩˧,˧˩˦,˧˩˥, ˧˨˧,˧˨˦,˧˨˥, ˦˩˨,˦˩˧,˦˩˦,˦˩˥, ˦˨˧,˦˨˦,˦˨˥, ˦˧˦,˦˧˥, ˥˩˨,˥˩˧,˥˩˦,˥˩˥, ˥˨˧,˥˨˦,˥˨˥, ˥˧˦,˥˧˥, ˥˦˥	(various): ˦˥˦,˦˥˧,˦˥˨,˦˥˩, ˧˥˦,˧˥˧,˧˥˨,˧˥˩, ˧˦˧,˧˦˨,˧˦˩, ˨˥˦,˨˥˧,˨˥˨,˨˥˩, ˨˦˧,˨˦˨,˨˦˩, ˨˧˨,˨˧˩, ˩˥˦,˩˥˧,˩˥˨,˩˥˩, ˩˦˧,˩˦˨,˩˦˩, ˩˧˨,˩˧˩, ˩˨˩

An IPA/Chao tone letter will rarely be composed of more than three elements (which are sufficient for peaking and dipping tones). Occasionally, however, peaking–dipping and dipping–peaking tones, which require four elements — or even double-peaking and double-dipping tones, which require five — are encountered. This is usually only the case when prosody is superposed on lexical or grammatical tone, but a good computer font will allow an indefinite number of tone letters to be concatenated. The IPA diacritics placed over vowels and other letters have not been extended to this level of complexity.

=== Africa ===
In African linguistics (as well as in many African orthographies), a set of diacritics is usual to mark tone. The most common are a subset of the International Phonetic Alphabet:

High tone	acute	á
Mid tone	macron	ā
Low tone	grave	à

Minor variations are common. In many three-tone languages, it is usual to mark high and low tone as indicated above but to omit marking of the mid tone: má (high), ma (mid), mà (low). Similarly, in two-tone languages, only one tone may be marked explicitly, usually the less common or more 'marked' tone (see markedness).

When digits are used, typically 1 is high and 5 is low, except in Omotic languages, where 1 is low and 5 or 6 is high. In languages with just two tones, 1 may be high and 2 low, etc.

=== Asia ===
In the Chinese tradition, digits are assigned to various tones (see tone number). For instance, Standard Mandarin Chinese, the official language of China, has four lexically contrastive tones, and the digits 1, 2, 3, and 4 are assigned to four tones. Syllables can sometimes be toneless and are described as having a neutral tone, typically indicated by omitting tone markings. Chinese varieties are traditionally described in terms of four tonal categories ping ('level'), shang ('rising'), qu ('exiting'), ru ('entering'), based on the traditional analysis of Middle Chinese (see Four tones); note that these are not at all the same as the four tones of modern standard Mandarin Chinese. (Note: Specifically, words that had the Middle Chinese ping (level) tone are now distributed over tones 1 and 2 in Mandarin Chinese, while the Middle Chinese shang (rising) and qu (exiting) tones have become Mandarin Chinese tones 3 and 4, respectively. Words with the former ru (entering) tone, meanwhile, have been distributed over all four tones.) Depending on the dialect, each of these categories may then be divided into two tones, typically called yin and yang. Typically, syllables carrying the ru tones are closed by voiceless stops in Chinese varieties that have such coda(s) so in such dialects, ru is not a tonal category in the sense used by Western linguistics but rather a category of syllable structures. Chinese phonologists perceived these checked syllables as having concomitant short tones, justifying them as a tonal category. In Middle Chinese, when the tonal categories were established, the shang and qu tones also had characteristic final obstruents with concomitant tonic differences whereas syllables bearing the ping tone ended in a simple sonorant. An alternative to using the Chinese category names is assigning to each category a digit ranging from 1 to 8, sometimes higher for some Southern Chinese dialects with additional tone splits. Syllables belonging to the same tone category differ drastically in actual phonetic tone across the varieties of Chinese even among dialects of the same group. For example, the yin ping tone is a high level tone in Beijing Mandarin Chinese but a low level tone in Tianjin Mandarin Chinese.

More iconic systems use tone numbers or an equivalent set of graphic pictograms known as "Chao tone letters". These divide the pitch into five levels, with the lowest being assigned the value 1 and the highest the value 5. (This is the opposite of equivalent systems in Africa and the Americas.) The variation in pitch of a tone contour is notated as a string of two or three numbers. For instance, the four Mandarin Chinese tones are transcribed as follows (the tone letters will not display properly without a compatible font installed):

Tones of Standard Chinese (Mandarin)
High tone	55	˥	(Tone 1)
Mid rising tone	35	˧˥	(Tone 2)
Low dipping tone	21(4)	˨˩˦	(Tone 3)
High falling tone	51	˥˩	(Tone 4)

A mid-level tone would be indicated by /33/, a low level tone /11/, etc. The doubling of the number is commonly used with level tones to distinguish them from tone numbers; tone 3 in Mandarin Chinese, for example, is not mid /3/. However, it is not necessary with tone letters, so /33/ = /˧˧/ or simply /˧/. If a distinction is made, it may be that /˧/ is mid tone in a register system and /˧˧/ is mid level tone in a contour system, or /˧/ may be mid tone on a short syllable or a mid checked tone, while /˧˧/ is mid tone on a long syllable or a mid unchecked tone.

IPA diacritic notation is also sometimes seen for Chinese. One reason it is not more widespread is that only two contour tones, rising /ɔ̌/ and falling /ɔ̂/, are widely supported by IPA fonts while several Chinese varieties have more than one rising or falling tone. One common workaround is to retain standard IPA /ɔ̌/ and /ɔ̂/ for high-rising (e.g. /˧˥/) and high-falling (e.g. /˥˧/) tones and to use the subscript diacritics /ɔ̗/ and /ɔ̖/ for low-rising (e.g. /˩˧/) and low-falling (e.g. /˧˩/) tones.

=== North America ===
Several North American languages have tone, one of which is Cherokee, an Iroquoian language. Oklahoma Cherokee has six tones (1 low, 2 medium, 3 high, 4 very high, 5 rising and 6 falling). The Tanoan languages have tone as well. For instance, Kiowa has three tones (high, low, falling), while Jemez has four (high, mid, low, and falling).

In Mesoamericanist linguistics, /1/ stands for high tone and /5/ stands for low tone, except in Oto-Manguean languages for which /1/ may be low tone and /3/ high tone. It is also common to see acute accents for high tone and grave accents for low tone and combinations of these for contour tones. Several popular orthographies use ⟨j⟩ or ⟨h⟩ after a vowel to indicate low tone. The Southern Athabascan languages that include the Navajo and Apache languages are tonal, and are analyzed as having two tones: high and low. One variety of Hopi has developed tone, as has the Cheyenne language.

=== Tone orthographies ===
In Roman script orthographies, a number of approaches are used. Diacritics are common, as in pinyin, but they tend to be omitted. Thai uses a combination of redundant consonants and diacritics. Tone letters may also be used, for example in Hmong RPA and several minority languages in China. Tone may simply be ignored, as is possible even for highly tonal languages: for example, the Chinese navy has successfully used toneless pinyin in government telegraph communications for decades. Likewise, Chinese reporters abroad may file their stories in toneless pinyin. Dungan, a variety of Mandarin Chinese spoken in Central Asia, has, since 1927, been written in orthographies that do not indicate tone. Ndjuka, in which tone is less important, ignores tone except for a negative marker. However, the reverse is also true: in South Africa and for the Kasem language, there have been complaints that orthographies without tone marking are insufficiently legible.

Standard Central Thai has five tones—mid, low, falling, high and rising—often indicated respectively by the numbers zero, one, two, three and four. The Thai alphabet is an alphasyllabary, which specifies the tone unambiguously. Tone is indicated by an interaction of the initial consonant of a syllable, the vowel length, the final consonant (if present), and sometimes a tone mark. A particular tone mark may denote different tones depending on the initial consonant. The Shan alphabet, derived from the Burmese script, has five tone letters: ႇ, ႈ, း, ႉ, ႊ; a sixth tone is unmarked.

Vietnamese uses the Latin alphabet and its six tones are marked by letters with diacritics above or below a certain vowel. Basic notation for Vietnamese tones are as follows:

Tones of Vietnamese
Name	Contour	Diacritic	Example
ngang	mid level, ˧	not marked	a
huyền	low falling, ˨˩	grave accent	à
sắc	high rising, ˧˥	acute accent	á
hỏi	dipping, ˧˩˧	hook above	ả
ngã	creaky rising, ˧ˀ˦˥	tilde	ã
nặng	creaky falling, ˨˩ˀ	dot below	ạ

The Latin-based Hmong and Iu Mien alphabets use full letters for tones. In Hmong, one of the eight tones (the ˧ tone) is left unwritten while the other seven are indicated by the letters b, m, d, j, v, s, g at the end of the syllable. Since Hmong has no phonemic syllable-final consonants, there is no ambiguity. That system enables Hmong speakers to type their language with an ordinary Latin-letter keyboard without having to resort to diacritics. In the Iu Mien, the letters v, c, h, x, z indicate tones but unlike Hmong, it also has final consonants written before the tone.

The Standard Zhuang and Zhuang languages used to use a unique set of six "tone letters" based on the shapes of numbers, but slightly modified, to depict what tone a syllable was in. This was replaced in 1982 with the use of normal letters in the same manner, like Hmong.

The syllabary of the Nuosu language depicts tone in a unique manner, having separate glyphs for each tone other than for the mid-rising tone, which is denoted by the addition of a diacritic. Take the difference between ꉬ nge [ŋɯ³³], and ꉫ ngex [ŋɯ³⁴]. In romanisation, the letters t, x, and p are used to demarcate tone. As codas are forbidden in Nuosu there is no ambiguity.

== Origin and development ==
André-Georges Haudricourt established that Vietnamese tone originated in earlier consonantal contrasts and suggested similar mechanisms for Chinese. It is now widely held that Old Chinese did not have phonemically contrastive tone. The historical origin of tone is called tonogenesis, a term coined by James Matisoff.

=== Tone as an areal feature ===
Tone is sometimes an areal rather than a phylogenetic feature. That is to say, a language may acquire tones through bilingualism if influential neighbouring languages are tonal or if speakers of a tonal language shift to the language in question and bring their tones with them. The process is referred to as contact-induced tonogenesis by linguists. In other cases, tone may arise spontaneously and surprisingly fast: the dialect of Cherokee in Oklahoma has tone, but the dialect in North Carolina does not, even though they were only separated in 1838. Hong Kong English is tonal, a result of the contact between non-tonal British English with Hong Kong Cantonese, a tonal language; a similar process of tonogenesis has happened in Singapore English, although under slightly different conditions of linguistic contact, resulting in different tonal outcomes.

==== Examples ====
Tone arose in the Athabascan languages at least twice, in a patchwork of two systems. In some languages, such as Navajo, syllables with glottalized consonants (including glottal stops) in the syllable coda developed low tones, whereas in others, such as Slavey, they developed high tones, so that the two tonal systems are almost mirror images of each other. Syllables without glottalized codas developed the opposite tone. For example, high tone in Navajo and low tone in Slavey are due to contrast with the tone triggered by the glottalization.

Other Athabascan languages, namely those in western Alaska (such as Koyukon) and the Pacific coast (such as Hupa), did not develop tone. Thus, the Proto-Athabascan word *tuː ('water') is toneless toː in Hupa, high-tone tó in Navajo, and low-tone tù in Slavey; while Proto-Athabascan *-ɢʊtʼ ('knee') is toneless -ɢotʼ in Hupa, low-tone -ɡòd in Navajo, and high-tone -ɡóʔ in Slavey. Kingston (2005) provides a phonetic explanation for the opposite development of tone based on the two different ways of producing glottalized consonants with either tense voice on the preceding vowel, which tends to produce a high fundamental frequency, or creaky voice, which tends to produce a low fundamental frequency. Languages with "stiff" glottalized consonants and tense voice developed high tone on the preceding vowel and those with "slack" glottalized consonants with creaky voice developed low tone.

The Bantu languages also have "mirror" tone systems in which the languages in the northwest corner of the Bantu area have the opposite tones of other Bantu languages.

Three Algonquian languages developed tone independently of one another and of neighboring languages: Cheyenne, Arapaho, and Kickapoo. In Cheyenne, tone arose via vowel contraction; the long vowels of Proto-Algonquian contracted into high-pitched vowels in Cheyenne while the short vowels became low-pitched. In Kickapoo, a vowel with a following [h] acquired a low tone, and this tone later extended to all vowels followed by a fricative. In Afrikaans the glottal fricative also lowers the tone of surrounding vowels.

In Mohawk, a glottal stop can disappear in a combination of morphemes, leaving behind a long falling tone. Note that it has the reverse effect of the postulated rising tone in Cantonese or Middle Chinese, derived from a lost final glottal stop.

In Korean, a 2013 study which compared voice recordings of Seoul speech from 1935 and 2005 found that in recent years, lenis consonants (ㅂㅈㄷㄱ), aspirated consonants (ㅍㅊㅌㅋ) and fortis consonants (ㅃㅉㄸㄲ) were shifting from a distinction via voice onset time to that of pitch change, and suggests that the modern Seoul dialect is currently undergoing tonogenesis. These sound shifts still show variations among different speakers, suggesting that the transition is still ongoing. Among 141 examined Seoul speakers, these pitch changes were originally initiated by females born in the 1950s, and have almost reached completion in the speech of those born in the 1990s.

=== Tonogenesis ===
==== Triggers of tonogenesis ====
"There is tonogenetic potential in various series of phonemes: glottalized vs. plain consonants, unvoiced vs. voiced, aspirated vs. unaspirated, geminates vs. simple (...), and even among vowels". Very often, tone arises as an effect of the loss or merger of consonants. In a nontonal language, voiced consonants commonly cause following vowels to be pronounced at a lower pitch than other consonants. That is usually a minor phonetic detail of voicing. However, if consonant voicing is subsequently lost, that incidental pitch difference may be left over to carry the distinction that the voicing previously carried (a process called transphonologization) and thus becomes meaningful (phonemic).

This process happened in the Punjabi language: the Punjabi murmured (voiced aspirate) consonants have disappeared and left tone in their wake. If the murmured consonant was at the beginning of a word, it left behind a low tone; at the end, it left behind a high tone. If there was no such consonant, the pitch was unaffected; however, the unaffected words are limited in pitch and did not interfere with the low and high tones. That produced a tone of its own, mid tone. The historical connection is so regular that Punjabi is still written as if it had murmured consonants, and tone is not marked. The written consonants tell the reader which tone to use.

Similarly, final fricatives or other consonants may phonetically affect the pitch of preceding vowels, and if they then weaken to [h] and finally disappear completely, the difference in pitch, now a true difference in tone, carries on in their stead. This was the case with Chinese. Two of the three tones of Middle Chinese, the "rising" and the "departing" tones, arose as the Old Chinese final consonants /ʔ/ and /s/ → /h/ disappeared, while syllables that ended with neither of these consonants were interpreted as carrying the third tone, "even". Most varieties descending from Middle Chinese were further affected by a tone split in which each tone divided in two depending on whether the initial consonant was voiced. Vowels following a voiced consonant (depressor consonant) acquired a lower tone as the voicing lost its distinctiveness.

The same changes affected many other languages in the same area, and at around the same time. The tone split, for example, also occurred in Thai and Vietnamese.

In general, voiced initial consonants lead to low tones while vowels after aspirated consonants acquire a high tone. When final consonants are lost, a glottal stop tends to leave a preceding vowel with a high or rising tone (although glottalized vowels tend to be low tone so if the glottal stop causes vowel glottalization, that will tend to leave behind a low vowel). A final fricative tends to leave a preceding vowel with a low or falling tone. Vowel phonation also frequently develops into tone, as can be seen in the case of Burmese.

==== Stages of tonogenesis ====
The table below shows the process of tonogenesis in White Hmong, described by Martha Ratliff. The tone values described in the table are from Christina Esposito.

Tonogenesis in White Hmong
Atonal stage	CV		CVʔ		CVh		CVC_{vl}	
Tonogenesis	CV ^{level}		CV ^{rising}		CV ^{falling}		CVC_{vl} ^{atonal}	
Tone split	A1 ^{upper}	A2 ^{lower}	B1 ^{upper}	B2 ^{lower}	C1 ^{upper}	C2 ^{lower}	D1 ^{upper}	D2 ^{lower}
Current	[pɔ˦˥]	[pɔ˥˨]	[pɔ˨˦]	[pɔ˨]	[pɔ˧]	[pɔ̤˦˨]	--	[pɔ̰˨˩]

The table below shows the tonogenesis of the Vietnamese language. The tone values are taken from James Kirby.

Tonogenesis in Vietnamese
Atonal stage	CV		CVx > CVʔ		CVs > CVh	
Tonogenesis	CV ^{mid}		CV ^{rising}		CV ^{falling}	
Tone split	A1 ^{higher}	A2 ^{lower}	B1 ^{higher}	B2 ^{lower}	C1 ^{higher}	C2 ^{lower}
Current	ngang /˦/	huyền /˨˩/	sắc /˨˦/	nặng /˨/	hỏi /˧˨/	ngã /˧˥/

The table below is the tonogenesis of Tai Dam (Black Tai). Displayed in the first row is Proto-Southern Kra-Dai, as reconstructed by Peter K. Norquest.

Tonogenesis in Tai Dam
Proto-SKD	*∅		*-h		*-ʔ		*-ʔ͡C	
Tonogenesis	level		rising		falling			
Tone split	A1	A2	B1	B2	C1	C2	D1	D2
Current	/˨/	/˥/	/˦˥/	/˦/	/˨˩ʔ/	/˧˩ʔ/	/˦˥/	/˦/

The table below shows the tonogenesis of the Chinese languages.

Tonogenesis in Chinese
Atonal stage	-∅, -N		-ʔ		-s		-p, -t, -k	
Tonogenesis	平 píng (level)		上 shǎng (rising)		去 qù (departing)		入 rù (entering)	
Tone split	A1	A2	B1	B2	C1	C2	D1	D2

The tone values are listed below:

Tone values of modern Chinese lects
Class	SC	TSH	THH	XMM	FZM	SZW	SXW
A1	/˥/	/˨˦/	/˥˧/	/˥/	/˦/	/˦/	/˦˩/
A2	/˧˥/	/˩/	/˥/	/˨˦/	/˥˨/	/˩˧/	/˩˥/
B1	/˨˩˦/	/˧˩/	/˨˦/	/˥˩/	/˧˩/	/˥˨/	/˥/
B2	/˨˩˦/	/˧˩/	/˨˦/	/˥˩/	/˧˩/	(/˧˩/)	/˨/
C1	/˥˩/	/˥˥/	/˩/	/˩/	/˨˩˧/	/˦˩˨/	/˦/
C2	/˥˩/	/˥˥/	/˧/	/˧/	/˨˦˨/	/˧˩/	/˧˩/
D1	/˥, ˧˥ ˨˩˦, ˥˩/	/˨/	/˥/	/˧˨/	/˨˧/	/˥/	/˥/
D2	/˥, ˧˥ ˨˩˦, ˥˩/	/˥/	/˨/	/˥/	/˦/	/˨/	/˧˨/

- SC: Standard Chinese (Putonghua)
- TSH: Taiwanese Sixian Hakka
- THH: Taiwanese Hailu Hakka
- XMM: Xiamen Min (Amoy)
- FZM: Fuzhou Min
- SZW: Suzhou Wu
- SXW: Shaoxing Wu

The tones across all varieties (or dialects) of Chinese correspond to each other, although they may not correspond to each other perfectly. Moreover, listed above are citation tones, but in actual conversations, obligatory sandhi rules will reshape them. The Sixian and Hailu Hakka in Taiwan are famous for their near-regular and opposite pattern (of pitch height). Both will be compared with Standard Chinese below.

Word	Hailu Hakka	Standard Chinese	Sixian Hakka
老人家 'elder people'	lo^{LR} ngin^{HL} ga^{HF}	lao^{LF} ren^{MR} jia^{HL} (→ lao^{LF}renjia)	lo^{MF} ngin^{LL} ga^{LR}
碗公 'bowl'	von^{LR} gung^{HF}	wan^{LF} gong^{HL}	von^{MF} gung^{LR}
車站 'bus stop'	cha^{HF} zham^{LL}	che^{HL} zhan^{HF}	ca^{LR} zam^{HL}
自行車 'bicycle'	cii^{ML} hang^{HL} cha^{HF}	zi^{HF} xing^{MR} che^{HL}	cii^{HL} hang^{LL} ca^{LR}

- H: high; M: mid; L: low;
- L: level; R: rising; F: falling

The table below shows Punjabi tonogenesis in bisyllabic words. Unlike the above four examples, Punjab does not fall under the East Asian tone sprachbund, instead developing phonemic tone separately. In addition, unlike the above languages, which developed tone from syllable-final consonants, Punjabi developed tone from its voiced aspirated stops losing their aspiration. Tone occurs in monosyllabic words as well, but is not discussed in the chart below.

Tonogenesis in Punjabi
Atonal stage	C(V)VC̬ʰ(V)V	C̬ʰ(V)VC(V)V				C(V)VC(V)V
Tonogenesis	C̬ʰ → V́C̬V̀ / V_V	C̬ʰVC(V)V		C̬ʰVVC(V)V		-
Tonogenesis	C̬ʰ → V́C̬V̀ / V_V	C̬ʰ → T̥V, R̬V / #_V		C̬ʰVV → T̥VV̀, R̬VV̀ / #_VV		-
Result	C(V)V́C̬(V)V̀	T̥VC(V)V	R̬VC(V)V	T̥VV̀C(V)V	R̬VV̀C(V)V	C(V)VC(V)V

- C = any consonant; T = non-retroflex stop; R = retroflex stop; C̬ = voiced; C̥ = unvoiced; Cʰ = aspirated
- V = Neutral tone, V́ = Rising tone, V̀ = Falling tone)

== List of tonal languages ==
=== Africa ===
Most languages of Sub-Saharan Africa are members of the Niger-Congo family, which is predominantly tonal; notable exceptions are Swahili (in the southeast), most languages spoken in the Senegambia (among them Wolof, Serer and Cangin languages), and Fulani. The Afroasiatic languages include both tonal (Chadic, Omotic) and nontonal (Semitic, Berber, Egyptian, and most Cushitic) branches. All three Khoisan language families—Khoe, Kxʼa and Tuu—are tonal. Most languages of the Nilo-Saharan family are tonal.

=== Asia ===
Numerous tonal languages are widely spoken in China and Mainland Southeast Asia. Sino-Tibetan languages (including Meitei-Lon, Burmese, Mog and most varieties of Chinese; though some, such as Shanghainese, are only marginally tonal) and Kra–Dai languages (including Thai and Lao) are mostly tonal. The Hmong–Mien languages are some of the most tonal languages in the world, with as many as twelve phonemically distinct tones. Austronesian languages are mostly non-tonal, with a number of exceptions, e.g. Cèmuhî and Yabem (Austronesian). Austroasiatic languages are the only language family that show statistical variation in Mainland Southeast Asia, with one-third, or 24 tonal Austroasiatic languages out of a sample of 78 Austroasiatic languages studied by Brunelle & Kirby (2015). Tones in Vietnamese and Tsat may result from Chinese influence on both languages. There were tones in Middle Korean and a few tones in Japanese. Other languages represented in the region, such as Mongolian and Uyghur, belong to language families that do not contain any tonality as defined here. In South Asia tonal languages are rare, but some Indo-Aryan languages have tonality, including Punjabi (includes Hindko), Haryanvi, Khariboli, and Dogri, Sylheti, Chittagonian, Rohingya, Chakma as well as the Eastern Bengali dialects.

=== Americas ===
A large number of North, South and Central American languages are tonal, including many of the Athabaskan languages of Alaska and the American Southwest (including Navajo), and the Oto-Manguean languages of Mexico. Among the Mayan languages, which are mostly non-tonal, Yucatec (with the largest number of speakers), Uspantek, and one dialect of Tzotzil have developed tone systems. The Ticuna language of the western Amazon is perhaps the most tonal language of the Americas. Other languages of the western Amazon have fairly simple tone systems as well. However, although tone systems have been recorded for many American languages, little theoretical work has been completed for the characterization of their tone systems. In different cases, Oto-Manguean tone languages in Mexico have been found to possess tone systems similar to both Asian and African tone languages.

=== Europe ===
Norwegian and Swedish share tonal language features via the 'Single' and 'Double' tones, which can be marked in phonetic descriptions by either a preceding ' (single tone) or ៴ (double tone). The single tone starts low and rises to a high note (˩˦). The double tone starts higher than the single tone, falls, and then rises again to a higher pitch than the start (˨˩˦), similar to the Mandarin third tone (as in the word nǐ, /ni˨˩˦/).

Examples in Norwegian: 'bønder (farmers) and ៴bønner (beans) are, apart from the intonation, phonetically identical (despite the spelling difference). Similarly, and with in this case identical spelling, 'tømmer (timber) and ៴tømmer (present tense of verb tømme — to empty) are distinguished only through intonation.

The Scandinavian tone system is more correctly described as a pitch accent system because it only appears in combination with stress. It became phonemic because the number of syllables in certain words changed since the Old Norse period. A former one-syllable word which developed an additional syllable because of an epenthetic vowel or an added suffix kept its one-syllable pronunciation in contrast with a former two-syllable word that it was otherwise homophonous with. It previously also existed in Danish but has in nearly all forms of Danish developed into stød which is a rather a difference in vowel phonation but morphologically also behaves like a pitch accent.

A pitch accent system also developed within the Balto-Slavic languages and still exists in Lithuanian, Latvian (with one tone resembling the Danish stød), Slovenian and Serbo-Croatian.

According to Watson, Scouse contrasts certain tones, and some forms of Rhineland German can also be described as having a pitch accent system.

=== Summary ===
Languages that are tonal include:

- Over 50% of the Sino-Tibetan languages. All Sinitic languages (most prominently, the Chinese languages), some Tibetic languages, including the standard languages of Tibet and Bhutan, and Burmese.
- In the Austroasiatic family, roughly one-seventh (>24 out of 168) are tonal. These include Vietnamese and all of the Vietic languages, several Palaungic languages (Danau, Rumai Palaung, Riang, Lamet, Bumang, Khang, U,...), Mang, Bugan, Bolyu, four Khmuic languages, two Bahnaric languages (Koho and Southern Jeh), one Aslian language (Kensiu) and two Khmer dialects. Other branches of this family, such as Mon, Katuic, Nicobarese, and the Munda languages, are entirely non-tonal. However, some linguists like Norman Zide report that there is a low tone in Korku, the western-most Munda language.
- Some of the Malayo-Polynesian branch of Austronesian languages in New Caledonia (such as Paicî and Cèmuhî) and New Guinea (such as Mor, Ma'ya and Matbat) plus some of the Chamic languages such as Tsat in Hainan are tonal.
- The entire Kra–Dai family, spoken mainly in China, Vietnam, Thailand, and Laos, and including Thai and Lao, is tonal.
- The entire Hmong–Mien family is highly tonal.
- Many Afroasiatic languages in the Chadic and Omotic branches have tone systems, including Hausa.
- The vast majority of Niger–Congo languages, such as Ewe, Igbo, Lingala, Maninka, Yoruba, and Zulu, have tone systems. The Kru languages and Southern Mande languages have the most complex. Notable non-tonal Niger–Congo languages are Swahili, Fula, and Wolof.
- All Nilotic languages such as the Dinka language, the Maa languages, the Luo languages and Kalenjin languages have tone systems.
- All Khoisan languages in southern Africa have tone systems; some languages like Sandawe have tone systems like that of Cantonese.
- Slightly more than half of the Athabaskan languages, such as Navajo, have tone systems (languages in California and Oregon, and a few in Alaska, excluded). The Athabaskan tone languages fall into two "mirror image" groups. That is, a word which has a high tone in one language will have a cognate with a low tone in another, and vice versa.
- Iroquoian languages like Mohawk commonly have tone; the Cherokee language has the most extensive tonal inventory, with six tones, of which four are contours. Here the correlation between contour tone and simple syllable structures is clearly shown; Cherokee phonotactics permit only syllables of the structure (s)(C)V.
- All Oto-Manguean languages are tonal. In some cases, as with Mixtec, tone system variations between dialects are sufficiently great to cause mutual unintelligibility.
- The Ticuna language of the western Amazon is strongly tonal. Various Arawakan languages have relatively basic tone systems.
- Many languages of New Guinea like Siane possess register tone systems.
- Some Indo-European languages (notably Swedish, Norwegian, Lithuanian, Latvian, and Serbo-Croatian) as well as others possess what is termed pitch accent, where only the stressed syllable of a word can have different contour tones; these are not always considered to be cases of tone language. However, some languages belonging to the Indo-Aryan branch of the Indo-European family are tonal, such as Punjabi, Sylheti, some Eastern Bengali dialects, Chittagonian and Dogri.
  - Some English dialects, such as Liverpool and Belfast English.
  - Some European-based creole languages, such as Krio, Saramaccan and Papiamento, have tone from their African substratum languages.

In some cases, it is difficult to determine whether a language is tonal. For example, the Ket language of Siberia has been described as having up to eight tones by some investigators, as having four tones by others, but by some as having no tone at all. In cases such as these, the classification of a language as tonal may depend on the researcher's interpretation of what tone is. For instance, the Burmese language has phonetic tone, but each of its three tones is accompanied by a distinctive phonation (creaky, murmured or plain vowels). It could be argued either that the tone is incidental to the phonation, in which case Burmese would not be phonemically tonal, or that the phonation is incidental to the tone, in which case it would be considered tonal. Something similar appears to be the case with Ket.

The 19th-century constructed language Solresol can consist of only tone, but unlike all natural tonal languages, Solresol's tone is absolute, rather than relative, and no tone sandhi occurs.

== See also ==
- Meeussen's rule
- Musical language
- Lion-Eating Poet in the Stone Den

== Bibliography ==
- Bhatia, T.K. (1975). "The evolution of tones in Punjabi". Studies in Linguistic Sciences. 5 (2): 12–24. Archived from the original on 2022-02-09.
- Bao, Zhiming (1999). The Structure of Tone. New York: Oxford University Press. ISBN 978-0-19-511880-3.
- Brunelle, Marc; Kirby, James (2015). "Re-assessing tonal diversity and geographical convergence in Mainland Southeast Asia". In Enfield, N. J.; Comrie, Bernard (eds.). Languages of Mainland Southeast Asia: The State of the Art. De Gruyter Mouton. pp. 82–110. doi:10.1515/9781501501685-004. ISBN 9781501501708. OCLC 909907686.
- Chen, Matthew Y. (2000). Tone sandhi: Patterns across Chinese dialects. Cambridge, England: Cambridge University Press. ISBN 978-0-521-65272-8.
- Clements, George N.; Goldsmith, John, eds. (1984). Autosegmental Studies in Bantu Tone. Berlin: Mouton de Gruyer.
- Fromkin, Victoria A., ed. (1978). Tone: A Linguistic Survey. New York: Academic Press.
- Halle, Morris; Stevens, Kenneth (1971). "A note on laryngeal features". Quarterly Progress Report 101. MIT.
- Haudricourt, André-Georges (2018). "The origin of tones in Vietnamese (translation of: De l'origine des tons en vietnamien)". Problèmes de phonologie diachronique. Translated by Marc Brunelle: 146–160. Archived from the original on 2022-02-09. HAL 01678018.
  - Haudricourt, André-Georges (1954). "De l'origine des tons en vietnamien". Journal Asiatique. 242: 69–82.
- Haudricourt, André-Georges (2017). "How to reconstruct Old Chinese (translation of: Comment reconstruire le chinois archaïque)". Problèmes de phonologie diachronique. Translated by Guillaume Jacques: 161–182. Archived from the original on 2022-02-09. Reprinted (with additions).
  - Haudricourt, André-Georges (1954). "Comment reconstruire le chinois archaïque". Word. 10 (2/3): 351–364. doi:10.1080/00437956.1954.11659532.
- Haudricourt, André-Georges (1961). "Bipartition et tripartition des systèmes de tons dans quelques langues d'Extrême-Orient". Bulletin de la Société de Linguistique de Paris. 56 (1): 163–180.
  - Haudricourt, André-Georges (1972). "Two-way and Three-way Splitting of Tonal Systems in Some Far Eastern Languages". In Jimmy G. Harris; Richard B. Noss (eds.). Tai phonetics and phonology (PDF). Translated by Christopher Court. Bangkok: Central Institute of English Language, Mahidol University. pp. 58–86. Archived from the original (PDF) on 2022-10-09. Translation of Haudricourt (1961).
- Hombert, Jean-Marie; Ohala, John J.; Ewan, William G. (1979). "Phonetic explanations for the development of tones". Language. 55 (1): 37–58. doi:10.2307/412518. JSTOR 412518.
- Hyman, Larry M. (2007a). There is no pitch-accent prototype. 2007 LSA Meeting. Anaheim, CA.
- Hyman, Larry M. (2007b). "DRAFT: Tone: Is it Different?". In John Goldsmith; Jason Riggle; Alan Yu (eds.). The Handbook of Phonological Theory (PDF) (2nd ed.). Blackwell. Archived from the original (PDF) on 2012-07-28 – via UC Berkeley Phonology Lab Annual Report (2007).
- Hyman, Larry M. (2009). "How (not) to do phonological typology: The case of pitch accent" (PDF). Language Sciences. 31 (2–3): 213–238. doi:10.1016/j.langsci.2008.12.007. S2CID 10431925. Archived (PDF) from the original on 2022-10-09.
- International Phonetic Association (1989). "Report on the 1989 Kiel Convention". Journal of the International Phonetic Association. 19 (2): 67–80. doi:10.1017/S0025100300003868. JSTOR 44526032. S2CID 249412330.
- Kingston, John (2005). "The phonetics of Athabaskan tonogenesis". In Hargus, Sharon; Rice, Keren (eds.). Athabaskan Prosody. Amsterdam: John Benjamins Publishing. pp. 137–184. ISBN 9789027285294.
- Kingston, John (2011). "Tonogenesis" ( (PDF)). In Marc van Oostendorp; Colin J Ewen; Elizabeth Hume; Keren Rice (eds.). The Blackwell companion to phonology, Volume 4: Phonological interfaces. Chichester: Wiley-Blackwell. pp. 2304–2333. Archived from the original on 2021-12-10.
- Kirby, James; Brunelle, Marc (2017). "Southeast Asian Tone in Areal Perspective". In Raymond Hickey (ed.). The Cambridge Handbook of Areal Linguistics. Cambridge Handbooks in Language and Linguistics. Cambridge: Cambridge University Press. pp. 703–731. doi:10.1017/9781107279872.027. hdl:20.500.11820/b1f8fff3-64e5-4504-8a49-7ac2ff1e1293. ISBN 9781107279872. S2CID 5036805.
- Maddieson, Ian (1978). "Universals of tone". In Greenberg, J. H. (ed.). Universals of human language: Phonology. Vol. 2. Stanford: Stanford University Press.
- Michaud, Alexis; Vaissière, Jacqueline (2015). "Tone and intonation: introductory notes and practical recommendations". KALIPHO - Kieler Arbeiten zur Linguistik und Phonetik. 3: 43–80. Archived from the original on 2020-11-09.
- Michaud, Alexis; Sands, Bonny (2020). "Tonogenesis". In Aronoff, Mark (ed.). Oxford Research Encyclopedia of Linguistics. Oxford: Oxford University Press. doi:10.1093/acrefore/9780199384655.013.748. ISBN 9780199384655. Archived from the original on 2022-02-09.
- Odden, David (1995). "Tone: African languages". In Goldsmith, J. (ed.). Handbook of Phonological Theory. Oxford: Basil Blackwell.
- Odden, David (2020). "Tone". In Rainer Vossen; Gerrit J. Dimmendaal (eds.). The Oxford Handbook of African Languages. Oxford: Oxford University Press. pp. 30–47. ISBN 9780199609895.
- Pike, Kenneth L. (1948). Tone Languages: A Technique for Determining the Number and Type of Pitch Contrasts In a Language, with Studies in Tonemic Substitution and Fusion. Ann Arbor: The University of Michigan Press. (Reprinted 1972, ISBN 0-472-08734-7).
- Wee, Lian-Hee (2008). "Phonological Patterns in the Englishes of Singapore and Hong Kong". World Englishes. 27 (3/4): 480–501. doi:10.1111/j.1467-971X.2008.00580.x. Archived from the original on 2021-06-19.
- Yip, Moira (2002). Tone. Cambridge Textbooks in Linguistics. Cambridge: Cambridge University Press. ISBN 978-0-521-77314-0. ISBN 0-521-77445-4 (pbk).
