= Floating tone =

Linguistic term

A floating tone is a morpheme or element of a morpheme that contains neither consonants nor vowels, but only tone. It cannot be pronounced by itself but affects the tones of neighboring morphemes.

An example occurs in Bambara, a Mande language of Mali that has two phonemic tones, high and low. The definite article is a floating low tone, and with a noun in isolation, it is associated with the preceding vowel and turns a high tone into a falling tone: [bá] river; [bâ] the river. When it occurs between two high tones, it downsteps the following tone:

- [bá tɛ́] it's not a river
- [bá tɛ̄] (or [bá ꜜ tɛ́]) it's not the river

Also common are floating tones associated with a segmental morpheme such as an affix. For example, in Okphela, an Edoid language of Nigeria, the main negative morpheme is distinguished from the present tense morpheme by tone; the present tense morpheme (á-) carries high tone, whereas the negative past morpheme (´a-) imposes a high tone on the syllable which precedes it:

- oh á-nga he is climbing
- óh a-nga he didn't climb

Floating tones derive historically from morphemes which assimilate or lenite to the point that only their tone remains.
