= Downdrift =

Lowering of pitch during a sentence

In phonetics, downdrift (also known as automatic downstep) is the cumulative lowering of pitch in the course of a sentence due to interactions among tones in a tonal language. Downdrift often occurs when the tones in successive syllables are H L H (high, low, high) or H L L H (high, low, low, high). In this case the second high tone tends to be lower than the first. The effect can accumulate so that with each low tone, the pitch of the high tones becomes slightly lower, until the end of the intonational phrase, when the pitch is "reset".

However, not every sequence of H L H leads to downdrift. In some languages, in some circumstances, the two high tones in a sequence H L H can be pronounced on the same level, with a "plateau" between them; that is, H L H changes to H H H. This occurs for example in Chichewa if the first H is a proclitic word, e.g. á "of" + Maláwi "Malawi" is pronounced á Máláwi "of Malawi", with a plateau. In other languages, in some circumstances, even longer sequences such as H L L L H can become plateaux, for example, in Luganda, kíri mu Bugáńda 'it is in Buganda' is pronounced kírí mú Búgáńda, with a plateau instead of downdrift.

Two basic types of downdrift are found. In one, called discrete downdrift, when downstep occurs all tones shift downward, so that their relative difference in pitch remains constant; in the other, called tone terracing, the pitch of the low tone remains at the lower end of the speaker's vocal range, while the high tones shift downward, so that their difference in pitch narrows.

Pitch reset is required in the first instance because the tones approach the lower end of the speaker's comfort range, and in the second because the tonal distinctions of the language start being lost.
