= Downstep =

Tone phenomenon in some languages

ꜜ◌

ꜝ◌
- IPA number: 517

Encoding
- Entity (decimal): &#42780;
- Unicode (hex): U+A71C

Downstep is a phenomenon in tone languages in which if two syllables have the same tone (for example, both with a high tone or both with a low tone), the second syllable is lower in pitch than the first.

Two main kinds of downstep can be distinguished. The first, more usually called automatic downstep, downdrift or catathesis, occurs when high and low tones come in the sequence H L (L) H; the second high tone tends to be lower than the first because of the intervening low-toned syllable. It is common in African languages, such as Chichewa. It has also been argued that the same phenomenon is heard in English sentences, if these sentences are pronounced with a falling intonation, for example I really believe Ebenezer was a dealer in magnesium, or I bought blueberries, bayberries, raspberries, mulberries, and brambleberries.

Downstep proper, or non-automatic downstep, is another phenomenon found in many African languages, such as Igbo (see Downing & Rialland (2017) for an overview of downstep in African languages). When two high tones are in succeeding syllables (thus in the sequence H H), and the second is lower than the first, there is said to be a downstep.

The symbol for the second kind of downstep in the International Phonetic Alphabet is a superscript down arrow, ⟨ꜜ⟩ (^{↓}). It is common to see instead a superscript exclamation mark ⟨ꜝ⟩ (^{!}) because of typographic constraints, though technically that would mean an incompletely or lightly articulated alveolar click release.

It has been shown that in most, if not all, cases of downstep proper, the lowering of the second high tone occurs when an intervening low-toned syllable has dropped out. What was H (L) H has become HꜜH. The missing low-toned syllable creates what is known as a 'floating tone'. An example occurs in Bambara, a language spoken in Mali. In Bambara, the definite article is a floating low tone. With a noun in isolation, it docks to the preceding vowel and turns a high tone into a falling tone:

/bá/	river
/bâ/	the river

However, when it occurs between two high tones, it downsteps the following tone:

/bá tɛ́/	it's not a river
/bá ꜜtɛ́/	it's not the river

== See also ==
- Upstep, which is less commonly phonemic.

== Bibliography ==
- Beckman, Mary E. & Pierrehumbert, Janet B. (1986). "Intonational Structure in English and Japanese" (PDF). Phonology Yearbook. 3: 255–309. doi:10.1017/S095267570000066X. S2CID 62734066. Archived from the original (PDF) on 2012-03-13.
- Connell, Bruce (2001), Downdrift, Downstep, and Declination (PDF), Bielefeld University, Germany: Typology of African Prosodic Systems Workshop, archived from the original (PDF) on 13 June 2007
- Crystal, David (2003). A dictionary of linguistics & phonetics. Wiley-Blackwell. p. 130.
- Downing, Laura J. & Rialland, Annie (2017). Intonation in African tone languages. Berlin: De Gruyter. ISBN 978-3110503524. OCLC 963605080.
- Myers, Scott (1996). "Boundary tones and the phonetic implementation of tone in Chichewa" (PDF). Studies in African Linguistics. 25 (1): 29–60. doi:10.32473/sal.v25i1.107403. S2CID 126264216.
- Pierrehumbert, Janet B. (1980). The Phonology and Phonetics of English Intonation (PDF) (PhD). Massachusetts Institute of Technology. Archived from the original (PDF) on 2015-12-13.
- Welmers, William E. (1974). African Language Structures. University of California Press.
- Yip, Moira (2002). Tone. Cambridge University Press.
