= LHHH =

LHHH may refer to:

- Hármashatárhegy Airport, a non-public airport in Hármashatár-hegy, Hungary with the ICAO code LHHH
- Love & Hip Hop: Hollywood, a reality show on the American television network VH1
- LHHH (local bumping with bridging), a form of tone shifting ('bumping') found in Chichewa tones
