= Luganda tones =

Aspect of the Luganda language

Luganda, the language spoken by the Baganda people from Central Uganda, is a tonal language of the Bantu family. It is traditionally described as having three tones: high (á), low (à) and falling (â). Rising tones are not found in Luganda, even on long vowels, since a sequence such as [àá] automatically becomes [áá].

Tones perform various functions in Luganda: they help to distinguish one word from another, they distinguish one verb tense from another, and they are also used in sentence intonation, for example, to distinguish a statement from a question.

The complexity of the Luganda tonal system has attracted the attention of numerous scholars, who have sought ways of describing Luganda tones most economically according to different linguistic models.

== Overview ==
In Luganda some words have a lexical tone: ekibúga 'city', omusómesa 'teacher'. The tone can be a falling one: ensî 'country', omwâna 'child', eddwâliro 'hospital'. Some words have a double tone or a tone spread across three syllables in a plateau: mugóbâ 'driver', ekkómérâ 'prison'. In some nouns the tone moves position: omuwála 'girl', but muwalâ 'she is a girl'.

Other words, such as ekitabo 'book', omuntu 'person', amata 'milk', or Mbarara (name of a town), are underlyingly toneless. However, toneless words usually receive automatic default tones, called phrasal tones, on all syllables except the first: ekítábó, omúntú. But in some circumstances this phrasal tone does not appear, for example, when the word is the subject of a sentence or qualified by a number. The automatic phrasal tones are not as high-pitched as lexical tones.

Automatic phrasal tones are also added at the end of lexically toned words. In nouns the phrasal tones begin on the syllable immediately after the fall in pitch, e.g. eddwâlíró 'hospital', masérengétá 'south'. Again, these phrasal tones do not appear when the word is used as the subject of the sentence or qualified by a number.

However, in some verbal forms the phrasal tones do not begin immediately after the accent but after an interval of two or three low-toned syllables, e.g. bálilabá 'they will see'. This complexity prevents Luganda from being described as a simple pitch-accent language.

Verbs are divided into two tonal classes, those with a tone, such as okulába 'to see', and those that are toneless apart from the automatic phrasal tone, such as okúsómá 'to read'. Verbs are subject to a series of complex tonal patterns, which vary according to tense and whether the verbs are high-toned or toneless, positive or negative, or used in a main clause or relative clause.

== Common intonational patterns ==
Although there are many complexities of detail, there are certain types of intonational pattern which occur regularly. One common pattern is for sentences to have a gradual descent from the first high tone to the last, as in the following:

- kye kibúga ekikúlu mu Ugáńda 'it is the chief city in Uganda'

The three high tones ú, ú, and áń stand out prominently from the other syllables, and each one is a little lower than the last, as if coming down in a series of steps. The toneless syllables between are lower in pitch than the high tones. This descent, which is known as downdrift, 'automatic downstep', or 'catathesis', is common in many African languages whenever tones come in a sequence HLH (high-low-high).

Another type of tonal pattern very common in Luganda is the high tone plateau. In this pattern, two high tones are at the same level, and the voice remains continuously high from one the other. A plateau can occur between two lexical tones, as in the following example:

- kírí mú Úgáńda 'it is in Uganda'

A plateau also often occurs between a phrasal tone and lexical tone, or between two phrasal tones:

- mu mambúká gá Úgáńda 'in the north of Uganda'
- ayágálá ókúlímá ámátóóké 'he wants to cultivate bananas'

A third type of tonal pattern, not quite so common, is to have a series of low tones followed by a jump to a high one:

- Mbarara kibúga 'Mbarara is a city'
- ebitabo kkúmi 'ten books'

These three tonal patterns occur regularly in Luganda sentences, and much of the description below concerns when to use one and when another.

== Types of tone ==
There are various types of high tone in Luganda, of which lexical, grammatical and phrasal tones are the most important. To these can be added boundary tones and other tones indicating intonation.

=== Lexical tones ===
Lexical high tones are those that go with particular words, such as those on the words below:

- ekib**ú**ga 'city'
- ens**î** 'country'

When a word with final tone such as ensî 'country' is spoken in isolation or at the end of a sentence, the tone is always heard as a falling tone; but in other contexts, it is generally heard as an ordinary high tone.

Falling lexical tones can also be heard in non-final position:

- eddw**â**líró 'hospital'

Some words in Luganda have two lexical high tones. When this happens the two tones link into a plateau; that is, the syllables between are also raised. (In this article, a plateau is shown by underlining.)

- K**á**mpál**â** '(the city of) Kampala'
- edd**ú**úk**â** 'shop'

A lexical tone, if it does not form a plateau with a following lexical tone, is always followed by a low tone. This low tone can either be in the following syllable, as in ekibúga 'city' or the second half (mora) of a syllable containing a falling tone, as in eddwâlíró 'hospital' or ensî 'country'.

=== Grammatical tones ===
A grammatical tone is one that arises when a verb is used in a particular tense. For example, a verb in the subjunctive mood always has a high or falling tone on the last syllable:

- muyingir**ê** 'you should come in, please come in'

In this article, to distinguish them from phrasal high tones, lexical and grammatical tones are marked in bold.

=== Phrasal tones ===
Phrasal tones are high tones automatically added to words in certain contexts. In other contexts, the same word may be pronounced without phrasal tones. For example, when a word without lexical tones is the subject of a sentence, or followed by a number or quantity word, it remains toneless:

- Mbarara kib**ú**ga 'Mbarara is a city'
- ebitabo kk**ú**mi 'ten books'

But in most other contexts, or when spoken in isolation, the word has a high tone on all the syllables except the first mora of the word (the phrasal tones are shown here by being underlined):

- ebítábó 'books'
- mu mambúká 'in the north'

A geminate consonant such as [tt] counts as one mora, and so if a word begins with a geminate consonant, the phrasal tone can begin immediately after it:

- Tóró [ttóóró] '(the kingdom of) Toro'
- ggwé [ggwéé] 'you (sg.)'
- ssóméró 'it is a school'

Since a rising tone [àá] becomes a level high tone [áá] in Luganda, the following word also has a high tone throughout:

- yéé 'yes'

Phrasal tones can also be added to the end of words that have a lexical high tone. However, between the lexical tone and the phrasal tones there must always be at least one low-toned syllable or mora:

- t**ú**gendá 'we are going'
- amas**é**rengétá 'south'

If the lexical tone is a falling one, the second half the syllable with the tone counts as a low-toned mora, and the phrasal tones begin immediately on the following syllable:

- eddw**â**líró 'hospital'
- abag**â**ndá 'Baganda people'

Whenever a word has a lexical as well as a phrasal tone like this, the lexical tone and the phrasal tone do not form a plateau but instead there is a sequence HLH. As with every sequence HLH, the second H (which is the phrasal tone) is a little lower than the first.

A lexical or grammatical tone cannot form a plateau with a following phrasal tone; there is always at least one low-toned mora in between. However, a phrasal tone can very easily form a plateau with a following lexical tone or phrasal tone:

- mu kyaló Másí**ń**di 'in the village of Masindi'
- t**ú**gendá mú lúgúúdó 'we are going into the street'
- ayágálá ókúlímá ámátóóké 'he wants to cultivate bananas'

More examples of this are given below, as well as exceptions where no plateau is formed.

Phrasal tones tend to be less prominent than lexical tones and pronounced at a lower pitch. Often in a sentence if a word with lexical tone is substituted for one with a phrasal tone, the pitch is higher.

=== Words containing HLL or HLLL ===
Normally between a lexical or grammatical high tone in Luganda and a phrasal tone, there is just one low-toned syllable or mora. However, there are some words in which a high lexical or grammatical tone is followed not by one, but by two or even three low-toned syllables:

- b**á**lilabá 'they will see'
- ab**á**lilaba 'they who will see'

The existence of such words greatly complicates the description of Luganda tones and has important implications for theoretical accounts of the language. These are further discussed below.

=== Intonational tones ===
As well as the types of tone mentioned above, there are also intonational tones such as those that distinguish a question from a statement. For example, if a toneless word asks a yes–no question, it has a low tone on the final syllable. Compare these two:

- ssóméró 'it is a school'
- ssóméro? 'is it a school?'

A question like the following has a rise-and-fall on the last vowel:

- gwe gul**í** gwé **ń**néngérá wál**î**? 'is it the one I see there?'

Another type of intonational tone is an upglide sometimes heard just before a pause mid-sentence. It is referred to by Stevick (1968) as 'comma intonation', and it is a kind of boundary tone.

=== Tones and emphasis ===
Luganda does not use tones for focus or emphasis. As Crabtree says, 'The tone in Luganda is level, therefore it is impossible to emphasize as in English.' Instead he lists some other ways a Luganda speaker can emphasise words, such as placing the important word first, omitting an initial vowel where it would normally be added, using a relative construction (e.g. 'books are what I want'), using a negative construction (e.g., 'what I want, is it not books?') and others.

== Downdrift (catathesis) ==
The usual pattern when two words each have lexical or grammatical high tone is that the tone of the second word is lower than the first. The syllables in between are a little lower than the high tones, making a dip:

- ebibúga mu nsî 'cities in the country'
- bonná bawalâ 'all of them are girls'
- atéma omutî 'he cuts the tree'
- mu kibúga Kámpálâ 'in the city of Kampala'
- ebibúga birí 'those cities'

This is known as downdrift, catathesis, or automatic downstep.

Downdrift does not occur if two lexical tones are in the same word, as in Kámpálâ. In this case there is a plateau.

There is also usually a lowering of the tone if the first word ends in a lexical tone and the second word begins with one:

- balugú múńgi 'many yams'

The falling tone in balugû 'yams' changes to a high tone in this context, but there is still a downstep just as if the L part of the HL was still audible.

There is always downdrift when a phrasal tone follows a lexical one:

- kíri mu Bunyóró 'it is in Bunyoro'

== Plateauing ==
=== Lexical tone plateauing ===
As noted above, the usual pattern with words containing lexical tones is for each word in a series to be a little lower-pitched than the one before. However, in some circumstances two lexical tones are on the same level and form a plateau.

==== Phrases with 'of' ====
Typical of such phrases are those containing the word -á 'of', which forms a plateau not only with the preceding high tone but also with the following one, for example:

- mu maséréngétá gá Úgáńda 'in the south of Uganda'

The plateau is shown here by underlining.

If the second word is toneless, however, a plateau is made only with the preceding word:

- ekkengélé yómulénzí 'the boy's bell' (shortened from yá omúlénzí)

==== Verb + Location ====
Another kind of phrase that often has plateauing is 'verb + location', for example:

- kírí mú Búgáńda 'it is in Buganda'
- bágéńdá Wáńdegeyá 'they are going to Wandegeya'
- nabígúlá mú Kámpálâ 'I bought them in Kampala'
- ogitééká kú mmééza 'you put (present tense) it on the table'
- wano wáyítíbwá Kíbúli 'this place is called Kibuli'

Sometimes there can be a slight dip in this kind of phrase, e.g.

- kíri mu maséréngétá gá Úgáńda 'it is in the south of Uganda'

But even here the three underlying high tones are on the same pitch and do not drift downwards.

However, there is usually no plateauing in this type of phrase when the verb is relative:

- ekíri mu Bugáńda 'which is in Buganda' (with downdrift)

There is also no plateauing when the verb is negative:

- tebává mu Ugáńda 'they don't come from Uganda'

There is also no plateauing between a lexical tone and a following phrasal tone:

- kíri mu Bunyóró 'it is in Bunyoro'

==== Verb + focussed object ====
A plateau is also possible between verb and object, when the object is emphasised or focussed. Contrast:

- bágulá ébíkópo 'they buy cups'
- bágúlá bíkópo 'they buy CUPS' (not something else)

==== 'And' ====
Another situation where plateauing follows a lexical tone is after the word né 'and', which has a lexical high tone when used before a noun:

- Ugáńda né Kénya (pronounced yugáńda né kkénya) 'Uganda and Kenya'
- ebíjánjááló n' ébínyóobwá 'the beans and the peanuts'
- n' ábáwálâ 'and girls'

But as usual there is no plateau between the tone of né and a following phrasal tone:

- ebinyóobwa n' ébijánjááló 'the peanuts and the beans'

According to Hyman (2017), historically the word na/ne itself is underlyingly toneless, and the tone comes from the augment of the noun (i.e. the initial e- or a- or o-), which in an earlier stage of the language was high-toned.

Ne is in fact toneless in phrases like the following, when it is followed by a 'narrative tense' verb (a 'narrative tense' verb is a form of relative clause verb without its initial vowel, used after ne):

- ne bálímâ 'and they cultivate'

The word bálíná 'they have' (literally 'they are with') contains the word ná 'with'. This is followed by a plateau when positive, but not when negative:

- bálíná bálúgú múńgi 'they have many yams'
- tebálíná balugú múńgi 'they don't have many yams'

==== Verb + time ====
A plateau is heard before words like jjó 'yesterday', lulí 'the day before yesterday', and ddí 'when?' in these sentences:

- nayózá jjó essaáti enó 'I washed this shirt yesterday'
- nassálíbwá lúlí envíirí 'I cut my hair the day before yesterday'
- watúúká ddí wanó? 'when did you arrive here?'

But there is no preceding plateau if the time adverb is toneless, such as ddá 'a long time ago'. Instead the phrasal tone of the adverb makes a plateau with the following word:

- nagúla dd(á) éssááti enó 'I bought this shirt a long time ago'

=== Phrasal tone plateauing ===
In contrast to lexical tones, words with a phrasal tone very easily make a plateau with the following word, as the following examples show (the plateaus are indicated by underlining):

- mu mambúká gá Úgáńda 'in the north of Uganda'
- avá mú Búgáńda 'he comes from Buganda'
- abántú mú kíbúga 'people in the city'
- mu kyaló Másíńdi 'in the village of Masindi'
- ebíjáńjááló byé bááúzzê 'the beans that they bought'
- ayágálá ókúlímá ámátóóké 'he wants to cultivate bananas'

The phrasal high tone at the end of words like túgendá 'we are going' also forms a plateau in the same way, for example:

- túgendá mú lúgúúdó 'we are going into the street'
- báfumbé émmére 'they are cooking emmére (staple food)'
- amalwáalíró ámákúlu 'large hospitals'

Note that in these examples, it is not the lexical tone of words like túgendá, which forms a plateau with the high tone which follows, but the phrasal tone at the end of the word. So there is first downdrift in túgendá and then a plateau.

In a sentence like the following, in which an HLH word like túgendá is used in a 'verb + location' sentence where the location has a lexical tone, according to Stevick, the plateau in such sentences starts with the lexical tone. However, the speaker on the recordings of the Luganda Basic Course in sentences of this kind makes a plateau starting only with the second tone, so that there is a downstep first then a plateau:

- túgéndá mú Úgáńda 'we are going to Uganda' (according to Stevick)
- túgendá mú Úgáńda 'we are going to Uganda' (as read on the recordings)

=== Phrasal tone downdrift ===
A phrasal tone is usually followed by a plateau, which continues either to the next high tone or, if there is no high tone, to the end of the phrase. Nonetheless, there are some kinds of phrases where the phrasal tones continue only as far as the end of the word, followed by a low tone. The following high tone is lower than the phrasal tone (i.e., there is catathesis or downdrift).

An example of these types of phrases is when a noun is followed by the pronominal words banó 'these', abó 'the aforesaid', bonnâ 'all', or yekkâ 'alone' (or their equivalents in other noun classes), e.g.

- abántú banó 'these people'
- abántú abó 'the aforementioned people'
- abántú bonnâ 'all people'
- omúntú yekkâ 'the person alone'
- amátóóké anó bonnâ 'all those bananas'

However, there is plateauing before demonstrative adjectives of the -li type:

- abántú bálî 'those people'

Two other contexts where there is downdrift after a phrasal tone word are before nga 'when, if, as' and before nti meaning 'that':

- báánumyá nga bálya 'they talked as they were eating'
- agámbá nti 'he says that...'

(The word nga in this context is toneless, but before a noun it has a tone: ngá sukkáali 'like sugar'. It also has a tone when it means 'how...!': ngá wano bulúńgi! 'how beautiful it is here!')

There is a similar downstep after a personal pronoun in phrases like the following:

- nzé Mukásá 'I am Mukasa'
- ggwé aní? [ggwáaní] 'who are you?'

== Low tones then high ==
The third common intonational pattern in Luganda is a series of Low tones followed by a High. This is found only if the first word is toneless. The following are some circumstances when no phrasal tones are added to a toneless word, and it has low tones throughout.

First, when it is the subject or topic of a sentence (unless it is a personal pronoun like ggwé 'you sg.'):

- Mbarara kibúga 'Mbarara is a city'.

A toneless word also remains low-toned before a numeral or quantity word (except after a negative verb), e.g.

- ebitabo kkúmi 'ten books'
- abantu báńgi 'many people'
- amatooke ameká? 'how many bananas?'

The word buli 'each' also remains low-toned when followed by another word:

- buli lunáku 'each day'
- buli kitábó 'every book'

An adverb or a subordinate clause can also form the topic of a sentence and be low-toned, e.g.

- oluvannyuma, bálya emmére 'afterwards, they eat emmére (staple food)'
- nga ayagala ebijanjaalo, abigúla 'when he wants beans, he buys them'

== Falling tones ==
A high or a low tone may be found on any vowel, but a falling tone is found only on:

- (a) a final vowel, e.g. eggî 'egg'
- (b) a long vowel, e.g. okulóotá 'to dream'
- (c) a vowel followed by a prenasalised consonant, e.g. Abagândá 'Baganda people'
- (d) a vowel following a consonant + semivowel, e.g. okulwâlá 'to fall sick'
- (e) a short vowel followed by a geminate consonant, e.g. okubôbbá 'to throb'.

When a falling tone occurs on a syllable closed by a geminate, such as in okucôppá 'to become poor', the fall is very slight and hard to hear, though it can be measured instrumentally. The main way of telling that a word like this has a falling tone is that the tone on the following vowel is high.

=== Morae ===
One way of explaining these facts is to analyse Luganda words as consisting of morae or moras, that is, speech segments each lasting a certain time. According to this analysis, a short vowel has one mora and a long vowel has two morae. A 'long' consonant such as gg, mb, or ly also has one mora. Thus the third syllable gâ of Abagândá can be said to be long by position, since it has two morae, one belonging to itself and the other 'borrowed from' or 'shared with' the prenasalised consonant that follows. A long syllable can have a falling tone, with the first mora high and the second mora low.

Certain accommodations must be made to make the model fit. For example, an initial syllable starting with a vowel always counts as one mora, even in words like ensî 'country' where the vowel is long and followed by a prenasalised consonant.

No syllable can have more than two morae. For example, the second syllable of omwéngé 'beer' has only two, despite starting with mw and being followed by a prenasalised consonant.

=== Final vowels ===
Final vowels are usually pronounced short, but in some words (including all words with monosyllabic stems) the vowel becomes long before a suffix, for example ensî: kí? 'which country?'. Final vowels that can become long are considered to have two morae. Certain other final vowels, such as the final -é of the subjunctive mood, are considered to have one mora.

A final vowel therefore, if it is not toneless, can either have a high tone on the second mora (e.g. emú: 'one') or on the first mora (e.g. mwendâ 'nine'), or on its single mora (muyingiré 'please come in'). All three of these, when at the end of a sentence, are pronounced with a falling tone. In other contexts they have different pronunciations. For example, before the suffix kí 'what?' a tone on the first mora of a bimoraic final vowel falls: (ensî kí? 'what country?') but a tone on the last mora will remain high (tukolé kí? 'what should we do?').

If a word ends in a falling tone, the tone becomes an ordinary high tone in some circumstances. One of these is when it is the subject of a sentence:

- Kámpálá kibúga 'Kampala is a city'
- bonná bawalâ? 'are all of them girls?'

Another is before a quantity word:

- balugú múńgi 'many yams'

Although there are now two high tones in adjacent syllables, nonetheless a downstep still occurs just as if the L part of the falling tone were still audible, so that in the above phrase mú is slightly lower in pitch than gú.

== Nouns ==
Luganda nouns tend to fall tonally into certain regular patterns, of which the most common are (a) toneless (b) tone on the second mora from the end (c) tone on the third mora from the end. These three patterns together account for about 83% of nouns in Luganda. Some examples of the commonest patterns are as follows.

=== Toneless nouns ===
Judging from the numbers in the word list at the end of the Luganda Basic Course, about one third of all nouns (32%) in Luganda are underlyingly toneless. However, when pronounced in isolation, they have phrasal tones on all but the first mora (counting en- at the beginning of a word as one mora), as follows:

- ekítábó 'book'
- essóméró 'school'
- omúntú 'person'
- engáttó 'shoe(s)'
- omúlímú 'work, job'
- omúlénzí 'boy'
- akámwá 'mouth'
- olúpápúlá 'paper'
- enté 'cow(s)'
- envá 'relish'
- amátá 'milk'

=== Penultimate tone ===
Also very common, about 26% of the words, are nouns with a penultimate tone, that is on the second mora from the end of the word. If the penultimate syllable is long, as in enyáńja 'lake', both moras are high-toned. What all these nouns have in common is that the last vowel cannot take a phrasal tone. Examples are:

- entébe 'chair'
- ekibúga 'city'
- embúzi 'goat'
- ekikópo 'cup'
- omukóno 'hand, arm'
- enyáńja 'lake'
- ensíḿbi 'money'
- kááwa 'coffee'

=== Antepenultimate tone ===
Nouns with a high tone on the third mora from the end of the word (e.g., akagáali 'bicycle') are also common, and the various types listed below account for at least 25% of the vocabulary.

When used before a pause, or before a pronominal word like banó 'these' or bonnâ 'all' (see above) these words acquire a phrasal tone on the final syllable:

- akagáalí akó 'that bicycle'

However, in other contexts no phrasal tone is added, and there is no plateau with the following word:

- omwáaka ogúyísê 'last year'
- sáánywedde mázzi ku kankyâ 'I didn't drink water for breakfast'.

Contrast the following example, where the phrasal tone of matá 'milk' makes a plateau with the following word.

- sáánywedde matá kú kánkyâ 'I didn't drink milk for breakfast'

Some nouns of this type are:

- amáasó 'eyes'
- omwâná 'child'
- omwâká 'year'
- omwêzí 'month'
- enyáanyá 'tomatoes'
- amâzzi 'water'
- cáayi 'tea'
- ssukáari 'sugar'
- akagáali 'bicycle'
- emméeri 'ship'
- ekitûndu 'part'
- erînnya 'name'
- Abagânda 'Baganda people'

To these can be added a few nouns with the tone on the antepenultimate syllable, which are all marked by Stevick as HLL:

- ebugwáńjuba 'west'
- ebuváńjuba 'east'
- ekíbala 'fruit'
- ekkólero 'workshop'
- omusómesa 'teacher'

Hyman draws attention to the word ekíbala ('fruit'), which is unusual in having an accent on the class-prefix. He suggests that this is either because it may be a borrowing from another Ugandan language, Soga, or because it is a derivative of the verb -bála ('bear fruit').

A few nouns (mostly foreign) have a double tone followed by LL:

- Áméreka 'America'
- Omusíráamu 'Muslim'
- Olufálánsa 'French (language)'
- ennímáawa 'lemon' (Portuguese limão)
- amatáfáali 'brick'

=== Falling tone on the final ===
About 9% of the nouns have a falling tone on the final. The shorter of these nouns (up to three moras) have a single tone:

- ensî 'country'
- eggî 'egg'
- embwâ 'dog'
- balugû 'yam(s)'
- omutî 'tree'

The longer nouns have a second tone earlier in the word, which links into a plateau:

- ekibíínâ 'class'
- ekkómérâ 'prison'
- olubááwô 'board'
- eddúúkâ 'shop'
- ekyéńkyâ 'breakfast'
- obukííkâ 'direction'

A less common pattern is for a noun to have a tone on the penultimate and the final:

- mugóbâ 'driver'
- musíkâ 'heir'

=== Other patterns ===
A very few words (about 2%) have the tone far enough from the end of the word to allow for two phrasal tones following the HL of the lexical tone:

- amasérengétá 'the south'
- eddwâlíró 'hospital'

Other patterns are possible, for example Olwókusatú 'Wednesday' (ending in HLLL), but these patterns account for only a small percentage of the nouns.

=== Variable tone nouns ===
Certain words in Luganda have a high tone on the third mora, and the tone shifts to the following mora when the word is used without its initial vowel:

- Abagânda 'Baganda people' - Bagáńda 'they are Baganda'
- omusómesa 'teacher' - musomésa 'he is a teacher'
- omuwála 'girl' - muwalâ 'she is a girl'
- omutámiivu 'drunkard' - mutamíivu 'he is a drunkard'

Hyman and Katamba note that the same alternations take place in certain verb tenses:

- agulâ 'he who buys' - abigúla 'he who buys them'
- alagíra 'he who commands' - atulágira 'he who commands us'
- ayáámba 'he who helps' - atuyáamba 'he who helps us'

A similar alternation occurs in numbers 1–5, and in the words for 'yours' and 'his', with two differences: firstly the tone comes on the second mora, and secondly with a monosyllabic stem, the tone on the final is not deleted:

- bisátu - ebísatu 'three (e.g. books)'
- binâ - ebínâ 'four'
- bibyô - ebíbyô 'your ones (e.g. books)'

A few foreign nouns (mostly from Swahili) are also irregular, in that they have an extra tone in the plural or in the diminutive where the prefix has an extra syllable:

- bbakúli 'bowl' - plural mabákúli 'bowls'
- gguníya 'sack' - plural magúníya 'sacks'
- kkaláamu 'pen, pencil' - plural makáláamu
- mbaláasi 'horse' - diminutive kabáláasi 'little horse'

== Possessive pronouns ('my', 'our' etc.) ==
Possessive pronouns in Luganda are of two types, those with two syllables, namely -ange 'my', -affe 'our', -ammwe 'your (pl.)', -aabwe (pronounced [-aawwe]) 'their' and those with one syllable, namely -ô 'your' and -ê 'his, her, its'.

The two-syllable possessives used on their own have an HLL tone: ekkyânge 'my one (e.g. place, book, etc.)', ewâffe 'our home'. However, when they are used with a noun, they become enclitic, and if the noun is HLL this tone goes on the final vowel of the noun, making a plateau with the earlier tone:

- eríńnyá lyange (before a pause, lyangé) 'my name'
- okusómésá wange 'my teacher'
- akagáálí kange 'my bicycle'
- cááyí waffe 'our tea'
- amázzí waffe 'our water'

If added to a noun with a falling tone on the final, the final tone changes from falling to high:

- ensí: yange 'my country'
- eddúúká yange 'my shop'
- amagí gaffe 'our eggs'

Otherwise if the noun has penultimate tone, the tone on the final vowel is deleted by Meeussen's rule (HH > HL):

- ekibúga kyange 'my city'

When used with a toneless noun, however, the high tone migrates from the final syllable to the third mora of the noun. The tones that follow it are all L:

- ekitábo kyange 'my book'
- kitabó kyange '(it is) my book'
- ebitábo byaabwe 'their books'
- kitóóke kyange 'my plantain tree'
- kisumúluzo kyange 'my key'
- olupápula lwange 'my paper'

(The above rules are those given in the literature. In practice, however, the reader on the Luganda Basic Course recordings sometimes adds a tone on the final syllable of the noun even where it is theoretically not permitted: ensímbí zaabwe 'their money', emigáátí gyaffe 'our loaves', where the text writes emigáàtì, ekitábó kyange 'my book'.)

When the noun is a foreign borrowing, such as kitaambáala 'table-cloth' or mabalúwa 'letters', it is reported that the high tone plateau starts not on the accented mora, but the second mora of the word:

- kitáámbáálá kyaffe 'our table cloth'
- mabálúwa gaange 'my letters'

With a monosyllabic possessive namely -ô 'your' or -ê 'his', the tones are different. The first tone remains in the same place as before, then there is a plateau from the first tone to the end:

- ekitábó kyô 'your book'
- eríńnyá lyô 'your name'
- ekibúgá kyô 'your city'
- akagáálí ké 'his bicycle'

But when the noun has a tone on the final syllable, it becomes a high tone, and the tone of -yó is suppressed by Meeussen's rule (HH > HL):

- ensí: yo 'your country'
- mu kibííná: kyo 'in your class'

== Verbs ==
=== High and low-toned verbs ===
Like many Bantu languages, Luganda has high-toned and low-toned verbs. In the infinitive, low-toned verbs have the usual phrasal tones on all but the first mora:

- okúsá 'to grind'
- okwérá 'to sweep'
- okúggálá 'to shut'
- okújjá 'to come'
- okúlíndá 'to wait'
- okúsómá 'to study, read'
- okúsómésá to teach'
- okúgúlá 'to buy'

High-toned verbs (which are about 60% of verbs) have a high tone on the mora immediately following the infinitive prefix oku-. Phrasal tones are added only in the case of longer verbs:

- okulyâ 'to eat'
- okunywâ 'to drink'
- okutúma 'to send'
- okulába 'to see'
- okukóla 'to work, to do'
- okufúna 'to get, obtain'
- okuyîmbá 'to sing'
- okutândíká 'to begin'
- okuyîngírá 'to enter'

=== Meeussen's rule (HH > HL) ===
Verbs in Luganda are particularly affected by a rule known as Meeussen's rule, which is common in many African languages, whereby a sequence of tones HH becomes HL. Similarly HHH becomes HLL and HHHH becomes HLLL. (This rule does not affect nouns in Luganda.)

Thus *bá-lí-lába 'they will see' theoretically has three high tones, one for the prefix bá- 'they', one for the future tense-marker -lí-, and one for the verb-stem itself lába 'see'. However, after the operation of Meeussen's rule, and the addition of a phrasal tone, it changes as follows:

- *bá-lí-lába > bálilabá 'they will see'

The important point here is that a phrasal tone cannot be added (except on the very last syllable before a pause) to any syllable that formerly had a high tone. Thus in the above word bálilabá the remaining lexical tone on bá is followed not by one low-toned syllable, but by two.

Hyman and Katamba give the following examples to illustrate how a lowered H cannot acquire a phrasal tone or form a plateau:

- bálilabá ébíkópo 'they will see cups' (with a plateau), where bálilaba is derived from *bálílába
- abálilaba ebikópo 'they who will see cups' (with downdrift), where abálilaba is derived from *abálílábá

To make sense of the tones of Luganda verbs therefore, it is necessary to consider not only what tones the verb actually has, but also the underlying tones it had before the operation of Meeussen's rule.

=== Tones in tenses ===
Various elements add a tone to verbs:

- The tone of the subject prefix. This usually has a tone if it is a diphone (consisting of two phonemes) such as bá- 'they', tú- 'we', kí- 'it' etc., but usually toneless if it is monophonic (consisting of one phoneme), e.g. a- 'he/she', n- 'I', o- 'you (sg.)' etc. (For an exception see below on relative clause verbs.)
- The tone of the tense-marker. The tense-markers -á- (Near Past), -náa- (Near Future), -lí- (General Future), -kyá- ('still') all add a tone, while -a- (Far Past) adds a tone in the following syllable. (The tense-markers -nna- 'not yet' and -aaka- 'just' do not add a tone; there is also no tone in the ending -nga used to make the habitual aspect.)
- The tone of the verb-stem, if it is high-toned. In the Infinitive and General Future this tone is on the first mora only, but in the Present tense it affects the first two moras.
- The tone of the negative marker. The 1st person negative marker sí- has its own tone. The negative marker with other persons is te-, which adds a tone on the following syllable. In relative-clause verbs the negative marker is -tá-.
- In addition, many tenses add a grammatical tone on the final syllable. In longer verbs, in some cases this tone may move to the penultimate syllable.

Having added these tones, the following rules apply:

- Any sequence HLH (HLLH, HLLLH) becomes a plateau by the plateauing rule, for example tebágulá becomes tebágúlâ 'they do not buy'.
- Any sequence HH (HHH, HHHH) becomes HL (HLL, HLLL) by Meeussen's rule, unless there is a plateau; for example bálábá becomes bálaba 'they see'.
- Phrasal tones are added to the end of the verb, except that:

(a) A phrasal tone is not added to any syllable with the tone deleted by Meeussen's rule, except at the end of a sentence or before pronominal words such as bonnâ 'all'.
(b) A phrasal tone also does not directly follow the General Future infix -lí- in low-toned verbs, even if the tone of -lí- is deleted.

=== Relative clause verbs ===
Relative clause verbs have a different intonation from ordinary verbs in Luganda. They are more commonly used than in English, since as Crabtree pointed out (1902) they are used for emphasis. For example, instead of 'who bought things?' a Luganda-speaker would say 'which are the ones who bought things?'

- bakí abágúzé ebintu?

Similarly, instead of 'he went to Buganda to teach', a Luganda-speaker might say 'what he went to Buganda for is to teach':

- yágéndá mú Búgáńda kusómésá 'what he went to Buganda for is to teach'

An initial vowel is usually added before diphone subject-prefixes such as bá- (e.g. abágúlâ 'they who buy'), but not before monophonic prefixes such as a-. However, this initial vowel disappears in certain contexts, such as the second example above.

In object clauses, such as the following, a toneless prefix acquires a tone:

- emmére gye áfúḿba 'the staple food that she is cooking'

But when an object copula is used as in the following sentence, both kinds of prefix lose their tone:

- emmére gye bafúḿba 'the staple food is what they are cooking'.

The word gwe, ge, bye etc. itself usually has no tone. However, the rules for such clauses can be complex.

=== Examples of tenses ===
The tables that follow give examples of six commonly used tenses, together with the subjunctive mood and some comments on each. In the tables two verbs are used, -gula 'buy' and -lába 'see', as examples of low and high-toned verbs respectively.

==== Present tense ====
	basic	relative	negative	neg. rel.
'he buys'	agúlá	agulâ	tágúlâ	atágúlâ
'he sees'	alába	alába	tálaba	atálaba
'they buy'	bágulá	abágúlâ	tebágúlâ	abátágúlâ
'they see'	bálaba	abálaba	tebálaba	abátalaba

The underlying tones of the 3rd person plural of the high-toned verb change by Meeussen's rule as follows:

- *bá-lábá > bálaba 'they see' (HHH > HLL)

That is, the first two moras of the verb-stem in this tense are underlyingly high. (Compare básesemá 'they vomit'; bátandíká 'they begin'.)

When an object-infix such as -gu- 'it (e.g. bread)' is added, the tones change as follows:

- *bá-gu-lábá > bágúlába 'they see it'

The negative and relative versions of this tense all have a grammatical tone on the final vowel, which in fact has two moras and is underlyingly *-aá. In a two-mora high-toned verb, this final tone disappears by Meeussen's rule, but it reappears and makes a plateau when the verb-stem has three moras or more:

- tebálaba 'they do not see' (HHHH > HLL)
- tebáléétâ 'they do not bring' (HHLH > HHH)

When the irregular verb -li 'is (in a certain location)' is used in a relative clause, a high tone is placed on the final vowel when the prefix is toneless. But when the prefix has a tone, the tone on the final is deleted by Meeussen's rule. The tone therefore varies according to whether the prefix is a monophone or diphone:

- alí 'he is' - alí 'who is'
- báli 'they are' - abáli 'who are'

The two words alí and alí, although both end in high tones, are pronounced differently in contexts such as the following, where the tone of alí is higher and does not make a plateau:

- alí mú Búgáńda 'he is in Buganda'
- alí mu Bugáńda 'who is in Buganda'

==== Perfect tense ====
	basic	relative	negative	neg. rel.
'he has bought'	aguzê	aguzê	tágúzê	atágúzê
'he has seen'	alábye	alábyê	tálábyê	atálábyê
'they have bought'	bágúzê	abágúzê	tebágúzê	abátágúzê
'they have seen'	bálabye	abálábyê	tebálábyê	abátálábyê

The Perfect tense uses a different stem from the Present (e.g. -guzê instead of -gula 'buy'), and there is an underlying high tone on the ending. In longer (3-mora) low-toned verbs, such as -genda 'go' or -kweka 'hide (something)', the final tone moves to the penultimate syllable in the basic form:

- agéńze 'she has gone' (not *agenzê as one might expect)

All the forms of this tense have a tone on the final vowel, but the basic form is different from the negative and relative. In high-toned verbs, Meeussen's rule applies in the basic form (e.g. bálabye 'they have seen'), but in the negative and relative forms there is a plateau instead (tebálábyê they have not seen'). Another example, using the 1st person negative marker sí-, which keeps its own tone, is the following:

- ntégedde 'I have understood' vs. sítégéddê 'I have not understood'

==== Near Past tense ====
	basic	relative	negative	neg. rel.
'he bought (today)'	yágúzê	eyágúzê	teyáguze	atááguze
'he saw'	yálábyê	eyálábyê	teyálabye	atáálabye
'they bought'	báágúzê	abáágúzê	tebááguze	abátááguze
'they saw'	báálábyê	abáálábyê	tebáálabye	abátáálabye

The Near Past tense uses the same verb-stem as the Perfect tense but with the tense marker -á-. The subject prefixes change to yá- 'he' and báá- 'they'. The final vowel once again is -'ê.

In low-toned verbs the subject prefix makes a plateau with the grammatical tone on the final vowel:

- yá-gúzê 'he bought (today)' (from okúgúlá 'to buy')

In longer low-toned verbs in this tense the final tone moves to the second mora of the penultimate syllable:

- yákẃése 'he hid (today)' (from okúkwéká 'to hide something')

In high-toned verbs in this tense there is always a plateau even in the basic form of the verb (in this it differs from the Perfect tense above). Contrast:

- bálabye 'he has seen' (from okulába 'to see')
- báá-lábyê 'he saw (today)'

==== Far Past tense ====
	basic	relative	negative	neg. rel.
'he bought'	yagúla	eyagúla	teyagúla	atáágula
'he saw'	yalába	eyalába	teyalába	atáálaba
'they bought'	báágula	abáágula	tebáágula	abátáágula
'they saw'	báálaba	abáálaba	tebáálaba	abátáálaba

The tense-infix of this tense is a, which puts a tone on the following syllable.

Although the forms in the table above do not appear to have a high tone on the final, in fact there is an underlying high tone, which reappears and makes a plateau in forms like the following:

- ya-gú-kwékâ 'he hid it'

Another indication that there is an underlying high tone on the final vowel is the fact that forms like báágula 'they bought' do not add a phrasal tone on the final syllable (except before a pause or before a pronominal word like bonnâ 'all').

==== Near Future tense ====
	basic	relative	negative	neg. rel.
'he will buy (today)'	anáagúlá	anáagúlâ	táágúlê	atáágúlê
'he will see'	anáálába	anáálába	táálábe	atáálábe
'they will buy'	bánaagúlá	abánáágúlâ	tebáágúlê	abátáágúlê
'they will see'	bánáálába	abánáálába	tebáálábe	abátáágúlábe

The Near Future tense has a tense-marker -ná-a-. In the relative and negative forms, there is an (underlying) grammatical tone on the final vowel. In the negative of this tense, the final vowel changes to -e.

In the second person singular -ná-a- becomes nó-o-:

- *o-ná-a-lyâ > onóolyâ 'you (sg.) will eat'

==== General Future tense ====
	basic	relative	negative	neg. rel.
'he will buy'	alígulá	alígúlâ	táligulá	atáligulá
'he will see'	alílabá (?)	alílaba	tálilaba	atálilaba
'they will buy'	báligulá	abálígúlâ	tebáligulá	abátaligulá
'they will see'	bálilabá	abálilaba	tebálilabá	abátalilabá

This tense has a tone on the tense-marker -lí-. The tone of this disappears by Meeussen's rule after a high-toned subject prefix. A peculiarity of this tense is that with a low-toned verb, the syllable after -lí- cannot bear a phrasal tone, even when the tone of -lí- itself is deleted by Meeussen's rule.

The forms given above differ from those given by Stevick, who states that in this tense as in the Present the first two moras of a high-toned verb stem have underlying tone. However, the examples given by Hyman and Katamba (e.g. báliwulírá 'they will hear') imply that only the first mora of a high-toned verb has an underlying tone in this tense. Contrast the Present tense example below, in which both syllables of -laba are low, with the Future tense, where only the second syllable has a phrasal tone:

- bálaba omúgáátí 'they see bread'
- bálilabá ébíkópo 'they will see cups'

==== Subjunctive mood ====
- agulê 'he should buy'
- alabê 'he should see'
- bagulê 'they should buy'
- balabê 'they should see'

The subjunctive mood has just a single tone on the final vowel, which deletes all earlier tones in the verb. Before a pause, this tone becomes a falling tone, but before kí? 'what?', it remains high:

- muyingirê 'please come in, you should come in'
- tukolé kí? 'what should we do?'

Contrast the following, where the final vowel has a falling tone and two moras:

- ensî kí? 'what country?'

er The subjunctive has no relative clause or negative form, but a negative may be made by using the subjunctive of the verb okúlémá 'to fail' plus the infinitive.

- balemé okuyîngírá 'they should not come in'

== Object infixes ==
An object infix such as -mú- 'him/her' or -bá- 'them' can be added to a verb before the verb-root. In the infinitive, object infixes have a tone:

- oku-mú-siba 'to tie him/her'
- oku-bá-siba 'to tie them'

However, in the present tense, they are toneless:

- a-mu-siba 'he ties him/her'

But the reflexive infix is always high-toned, even in the present tense:

- okw-éé-siba 'to tie oneself'
- y-éé-siba 'he ties himself/she ties herself'

== See also ==
- Chichewa tones

== Bibliography ==
- Crabtree, William Arthur (1902). Elements of Luganda Grammar: Together With Exercises and Vocabulary. Reprint. London: Forgotten Books, 2013.
- Dutcher, Katharine & Mary Paster (2008), "Contour Tone Distribution in Luganda" Proceedings of the 27th West Coast Conference on Formal Linguistics, ed. Natasha Abner and Jason Bishop, 123–131. Somerville, MA: Cascadilla Proceedings Project.
- Hyman, Larry M. (2009). "How (not) to do phonological typology: the case of pitch-accent". Language Sciences 31, 213–238.
- Hyman, Larry M. & Francis X. Katamba (1990). "Final vowel shortening in Luganda". Studies in African Linguistics 21, 1-59.
- Hyman, Larry M. & Francis X. Katamba (1993). "A new approach to tone in Luganda", in Language. 69. 1. pp. 33–67.
- Hyman, Larry M. & Francis X. Katamba (2010). "Tone, syntax, and prosodic domains in Luganda". ZAS Papers in Linguistics 53, pp. 69–98.
- Hyman, L.M. (2017). "Bantu Tone Overview". UC Berkeley Phonetics and Phonology Lab Annual Report (2017)
- Kalema, John (1977). "Accent modification rules in Luganda". Studies in African Linguistics, vol. 8, no. 2.
- Kamoga, F. K. & Stevick, E. W. (1968). Luganda Basic Course. Foreign Service Institute, Washington. Sound files of this course are available free on the Internet.
- Kamoga, F. K. & Stevick, E. W. (1968). Luganda Pretraining Program. Foreign Service Institute, Washington.
- Meeussen, A. E. (1974). "Notes on Tone in Ganda". Bulletin of the School of Oriental and African Studies, Vol. 37, No. 1, pp. 148–156.
- Myers, Scott; Selkirk, Elisabeth; Fainleib, Yelena (2018). "Phonetic implementation of high-tone spans in Luganda". Laboratory Phonology: Journal of the Association for Laboratory Phonology, 9(1), 19.
