= Chichewa tones =

Phonetic features of Chichewa

Chichewa (a Bantu language of Central Africa, also known as Chewa, Nyanja, or Chinyanja) is the main language spoken in south and central Malawi, and to a lesser extent in Zambia, Mozambique and Zimbabwe. Like most other Bantu languages, it is tonal; that is to say, pitch patterns are an important part of the pronunciation of words. Thus, for example, the word chímanga (high-low-low) 'maize' can be distinguished from chinangwá (low-low-high) 'cassava' not only by its consonants but also by its pitch pattern. These patterns remain constant in whatever context the nouns are used.

Tonal patterns also play an important grammatical role in Chichewa verbs, helping to distinguish one tense from another, and relative clause verbs from main clause verbs. Tones are also used in intonation and phrasing.

Conventionally Chichewa is said to have high tones (H) and low tones (L). However, it has been argued that it is more accurate to think of it as having high-toned syllables versus toneless ones.

Not every word has a high tone. Over a third of nouns are toneless and are pronounced with all the syllables on a low pitch. When a noun has a high tone there is usually only one, and it is usually heard on one of the last three syllables. However, some nouns, like nyényezí 'star', have two tones or, like tsábólá 'pepper', a plateau of three high-toned syllables.

Chichewa thus in some respects can be considered to be a pitch-accent language with a 'mixture of accentual and tonal properties'. Some scholars, however, notably Larry Hyman, have argued that the term 'pitch-accent language' is an over-simplification and should be avoided; in his view it is best to consider such languages simply as one variety of tonal languages.

== How tones sound ==
=== 1st example ===
Voicetrack of the sentence Mwamúna, ámalamúlá amáyi ('A man, he rules women') (Myers (1996), p. 34), illustrating a boundary tone after mwamúna, and also the typical downdrift of tones through the sentence.

The accompanying illustration from Myers shows the typical intonation of a declarative statement in Chichewa:

mwamúna, á-ma-lamúla amáyi 'a man, he rules women'

The four high tones, marked H on the transcription, come down in a series of steps, a process common in many languages and known as downdrift, automatic downstep, or catathesis. This tends to occur (with some exceptions) whenever two high tones are separated by one or more intervening low tones; it does not occur when two high tones come in adjacent syllables.

Also illustrated in the pitch track is an intonational tone, known as a boundary tone, or 'continuation rise', marked L%H%. This rise in pitch is typically heard at any pause in the middle of a sentence, such as here, where it marks the topic: 'a man, he rules women'. The boundary tone is not obligatory, and Myers prints another pitch track of the same sentence where it is absent.

The toneless syllables tend to be lower than the high-toned syllables. However, the first syllable of amáyi anticipates the following high tone and is almost on the same level. The last syllable of á-ma-lamúla is also raised. This tonal spread from a penultimate high tone is frequently heard when a verb is immediately followed by its grammatical object. The first three syllables of á-ma-lamúla also show a glide downwards, with ma higher than la.

The penultimate tones of mwamúna 'a man' and amáyi 'women' are lexical tones, meaning that they always occur in these words. The tones of ámalamúla 'he rules' are grammatical tones, which are always found in the Present Habitual tense. The verb stem itself (lamula 'rule') is toneless.

=== 2nd example ===
Pitch-track of the sentence anádyétsa nyaní nsómba 'they fed the baboon (with) fish' recorded by Al Mtenje (from Downing et al. (2004))

The second illustration shows the pitch-track of the following sentence:

anádyétsa nyaní nsómba 'they fed the baboon (some) fish'

The sentence has a grammatical tone on the Remote Perfect tense anádyetsa 'they fed' and lexical tones on nyaní 'baboon' and nsómba 'fish'.

In this example, in the word anádyetsa the peak (high point) of the accent does not coincide with the syllable but is delayed, giving the impression that it has spread to two syllables. This process is known as 'tone doubling' or 'peak delay', and is typical of speakers in some regions of Malawi.

The second word, nyaní 'baboon', has an accent on the final syllable, but as usually happens with final accents, it spreads backwards to the penultimate syllable, showing a nearly level or gently rising contour, with only the initial n being low-pitched. Another feature of a final accent is that it tends not to be very high. In this case it is actually slightly lower than the high tone of nsómba which follows it.

When a final-tone word such as nyaní comes at the end of a sentence, it is often pronounced as nyăni with a rising tone on the penultimate and the final syllable low. But if a suffix is added, the stress moves to the new penultimate, and the word is pronounced with a full-height tone on the final: nyaní-yo 'that baboon'.

The third word, nsómba 'fish', has penultimate accent. Since the word ends the sentence, the tone falls from high to low.

As with the previous illustration, there is downdrift from the first tone to the second. But when two tones come in adjacent syllables, as in nyaní nsómba, there is no downdrift.

The intensity reading at the top of the voice track shows that the intensity (loudness) is greatest on the penultimate syllable of each word.

== Types of tone ==
Note: In this article syllables with an inherent lexical or grammatical tone are shown with an acute accent and with the syllable marked in bold (to make it easily visible). A tone which has spread from another syllable is marked with an acute, but without the bold print. Underlining is used to highlight places where a high tone has spread.

=== Lexical tones ===
==== Nouns ====
Certain syllables in Chichewa words are associated with high pitch. Usually there is one high pitch per word or morpheme, but some words have no high tone. In nouns the high pitch is usually in one of the last three syllables:

chímanga 'maize'
chikóndi 'love'
chinangwá 'cassava' (pronounced chinăngwá or chinăngwa)

In a few nouns (often compound words) there are two high tones. If these tones are separated by only one unaccented syllable, they usually join in a plateau of three high-toned syllables; that is, HLH becomes HHH. Similarly the first tone of words ending HLLH can spread to make HHLH:

bírímánkhwe 'chameleon'
tsábólá 'pepper'
chizólówezí / chizólowezí 'habit'

In addition there are a large number of nouns which have no high tone, but which, even when focussed or emphasised, are pronounced with all the syllables low:

chipatala 'hospital'
mkaka 'milk'
nyama 'animal'

It is also possible for a high tone to contrast with a toneless syllable, making a different word:

mténgo 'tree'
mtengo 'price'

A tonal accent differs from a stress-accent in languages such as in English in that it always retains the same pitch relative to the surrounding syllables. Thus the high tone of -kó- in chikóndi is usually higher pitched, never lower pitched, than chi- and -ndi.

==== High-toned verbs ====
Most verbal roots in Chichewa, including all monosyllabic verbs, are toneless, as the following:

thandiza 'help'
pita 'go'
-dya 'eat'
-fa 'die'

A few verbal roots, however, have a lexical tone, which is heard on the final vowel -a of the verb:

thamangá 'run'
thokozá 'thank'

The tones are not inherited from proto-Bantu, and do not correspond to the high-low distinction of verbal roots in other Bantu languages, but appear to be an independent development in Chichewa.

Often a verb has a tone not because the root itself has one but because a stative or intensive extension is added to it:

dziwa 'know'
dziwiká 'be known'

funa 'want'
funitsitsá 'want very much'

When an extension, whether a high-toned or low-toned, is added to a high-toned verb, only one tone is heard, on the final:

pezá 'find'
pezererá 'catch someone in the act'
thamangirá 'run after'

=== Grammatical tones ===
==== Tonal patterns of tenses ====
In addition to the lexical tones described above, Chichewa verbs also have grammatical tones. Each tense conforms to a particular tonal melody, which is the same for every verb in that tense (with adjustments made depending on the length of verb). For example, the following tenses have a high tone immediately after the tense-marker:

ndi-ku-thándiza 'I am helping'
ndi-ma-thándiza 'I was helping'
ndi-na-thándiza 'I helped (just now)'

The following have two separate tones, one on the tense-marker and one on the penultimate syllable:

ndi-nká-thandíza 'I used to help'
ndi-zí-thandíza 'I should be helping'
ndi-ka-má-thandíza 'if ever I help'

The following tenses are toneless:

nd-a-thandiza 'I have helped'
ndi-nga-thandize 'I can help'
ndi-ka-thandiza 'if I help'

and so on. There are at least eight different tonal patterns in affirmative verbs, in addition to further patterns used in negative tenses and in relative clause verbs.

==== Adding an object-marker ====
The tonal pattern frequently changes again when other morphemes such as aspect-markers or an object-marker are added to the verb. For example:

ndi-ku-thándiza 'I am helping'
ndi-ku-mú-thandizá 'I am helping him'

Further details are given below in the sections on the various tense-patterns.

==== Negative tense patterns ====
Negative verbs usually have different tonal patterns from the same tense when positive, and sometimes there are two different negative patterns, according to the meaning, for example:

sí-ndí-thandiza 'I don't help'
si-ndi-thandíza 'I won't help'

sí-ndí-na-thandíze 'I didn't help'
si-ndi-na-thandíze 'I haven't helped yet'

==== Dependent clause patterns ====
In several tenses the tonal pattern changes when the verb is used in a relative, temporal, or conditional clause. Sometimes a change in tonal pattern alone is sufficient to show that a verb is being used in this way. The principal change is that a tone is added on the first syllable of the verb, and there is often one on the penultimate as well:

chaká chatha 'the year has ended'
chaká chátha 'the year which has ended (i.e. last year)'

ali ku Lilongwe 'he is in Lilongwe'
álí ku Lilongwe 'when he is/was in Lilongwe'

ndi-ka-dá-thandiza 'I would have helped'
ndí-ka-da-thandíza 'if I had helped'

==== Lexical tone combined with tonal pattern ====
When the verb-root itself has a high tone, this tone can be heard on the final syllable in addition to the tonal pattern:

ndi-ka-dá-thandiza 'I would have helped'
ndi-ka-dá-thamangá 'I would have run' (lexical tone can be heard)

However, if the tonal pattern of the tense places a tone on the penultimate or final syllable, the lexical tone is neutralised and cannot be heard.

si-ndi-thandíza 'I won't help'
si-ndi-thamánga 'I won't run' (lexical tone deleted)

ndi-thandizé 'I should help'
ndi-thamangé 'I should run'

If a tonal pattern places a tone on the antepenultimate syllable of a high-toned verb, the two tones join into a plateau:

ndi-ku-thámángá 'I am running'
nd-a-mú-pézá 'I have found him'

=== Intonational tones ===
Lexical and grammatical tones are not the only tones heard in a Chichewa sentence, but there are intonational tones as well. One common tone is a boundary tone rising from low to high which is heard whenever there is a pause in the sentence, for example after a topic or subordinate clause.

Tones are also added to questions. For example, the toneless word kuti 'where?' becomes kúti in the following question:

kwánu ndi kúti? 'where is your home?'

Further details of intonational tones are given below.

== Number of tones ==
Two pitch levels, high and low, conventionally written H and L, are usually considered to be sufficient to describe the tones of Chichewa. In Chichewa itself the high tone is called mngóli wókwéza ('tone of raising'), and the low tone mngóli wótsítsa ('tone of lowering'). Some authors add a mid-height tone but most do not, but consider a mid-height tone to be merely an allophone of nearby high tones.

From a theoretical point of view, however, it has been argued that Chichewa tones are best thought of not in terms of H and L, but in terms of H and Ø, that is to say, high-toned vs toneless syllables. The reason is that H tones are much more dynamic than L tones and play a large role in tonal phenomena, whereas L-toned syllables are relatively inert.

Tones are not marked in the standard orthography used in Chichewa books and newspapers, but linguists usually indicate a high tone by writing it with an acute accent, as in the first syllable of nsómba. The low tones are generally left unmarked.

== Works describing Chichewa tones ==
The earliest work to mark the tones of Chichewa words was the Afro-American scholar Mark Hanna Watkins' A Grammar of Chichewa (1937). This was a pioneering work, since not only was it the first work on Chichewa to include tones, but it was also the first grammar of any African language to be written by an American. The informant used by Watkins was the young Kamuzu Banda, who in 1966 was to become the first President of the Republic of Malawi.

Another grammar including Chichewa tones was a handbook written for Peace Corps Volunteers, Stevick et al., Chinyanja Basic Course (1965), which gives very detailed information on the tones of sentences, and also indicates intonations. Its successor, Scotton and Orr (1980) Learning Chichewa, is much less detailed. All three of these works are available on the Internet. J.K. Louw's Chichewa: A Practical Course (1987) [1980], which contained tone markings, is currently out of print.

From 1976 onwards a number of academic articles by Malawian and Western scholars have been published on different aspects of Chichewa tones. The most recent work discussing the tones of Chichewa is The Phonology of Chichewa (2017) by Laura Downing and Al Mtenje.

Four dictionaries also mark the tones on Chichewa words. The earliest of these was volume 3 of J.K. Louw's Chichewa: A Practical Course (1987) [1980]; A Learner's Chichewa-English, English-Chichewa Dictionary by Botne and Kulemeka (1991), the monolingual Mtanthauziramawu wa Chinyanja/Chichewa (c.2000) produced by the Centre for Language Studies of the University of Malawi (available online), and the Common Bantu On-Line Chichewa Dictionary (2001) formerly published online by the University of California, Berkeley.

So far all the studies which have been published on Chichewa tones have dealt with the Malawian variety of the language. There is no published information available on the tones of Chinyanja spoken in Zambia and Mozambique.

== Some tonal phenomena ==
In order to understand Chichewa tones, it is necessary first to understand various tonal phenomena that can occur, which are briefly outlined below.

=== Downdrift ===
Normally in a Chichewa sentence, whenever two high tones are separated by one or more toneless syllables (i.e. when the tones come in the sequence HLH or HLLH or HLLLH), it is usual for the second high tone to be a little lower than the first one. So for example in the word á-ma-lamúla 'he usually rules' in the example illustrated above, the tone of the first syllable á is pronounced a little higher than the tone of the second tone mú. Thus generally speaking the highest tone in a sentence is the first one. This phenomenon, which is common in many Bantu languages, is known as 'downdrift' or 'catathesis' or 'automatic downstep'.

However, there are several exceptions to this rule. Downdrift does not occur, for example, when a speaker is asking a question, or reciting a list of items with a pause after each one, or sometimes if a word is pronounced on a high pitch for emphasis. There is also no downdrift in words like wápólísi 'policeman' (derived from wá 'a person of' + polísi 'the police'), where two high tones in the sequence HLH are bridged to make a plateau HHH (see below).

=== High tone spreading (HTS) ===
In some dialects a high tone may sometimes spread to the following syllable; this is known as 'High Tone Spreading' or 'Tone Doubling'. So where some speakers say ndináthandiza 'I helped', others will say ndináthándiza. Some phoneticians argue that what happens here, in some cases at least, is that the highest part or 'peak' of the tone moves forward, giving the impression that the tone covers two syllables, a process called 'peak delay'. An illustration of peak delay can be seen clearly in the pitch-track of the word anádyetsa 'they fed' reproduced above, here pronounced anádyétsa, in Downing et al. (2004).

There are some verb forms where tone-doubling does not occur, for example, in the Present habitual tense, where there is always a low tone on the second syllable:

ámalamúla 'they usually rule'

In order for HTS to occur, there must be at least 3 syllables following the tone, although not necessarily in the same word. Thus the first tone may spread in the second of each pair below, but not in the first:

zíkomo 'thank you'
zíkómo kwámbíri 'thank you very much'

tambala 'cock, rooster'
mtengo wá támbala 'the price of a rooster'

One frequent use of tone doubling is to link together two words into a single phrase. This most commonly occurs from the penultimate syllable, but in some dialects also from the antepenultimate. So, for example, when a verb is followed by an object:

akusáka 'they are hunting'
akusáká mkángo 'they are hunting a lion'

kuphíka 'to cook'
kuphíká nyama 'to cook meat'

kusámala 'to care for'
kusámála mkázi 'to care for a wife'

This phenomenon can be seen in the pitch track of the sentence mwamúna, ámalamúla amáyi illustrated at the beginning of this article, in which the tone of -mú- is extended to make ámalamúlá amáyi.

Tone doubling is also found when a noun is followed by a demonstrative or possessive pronoun:

mikángo 'lions'
mikángó iyo 'those lions'

chímanga 'maize'
chímánga chánga 'my maize'

=== Tonal plateau ===
It sometimes happens that the sequence HLH in Chichewa becomes HHH, making a tonal 'plateau'. A tonal plateau is common after the proclitic words á 'of' and ndí 'and', 'with':

wápólísi 'policeman' (from wá '(a person) of' and polísi 'police')
chákúdyá 'food' (from chá '(a thing) of' and kudyá 'to eat')
ndí Máláwi 'and Malawi'

Before a pause the final tone may drop but the tone of the middle syllable remains high: chákúdya. Sometimes a succession of tones is bridged in this way, e.g. gúlewámkúlu 'masked dancer', with one long continuous high tone from gú to kú.

Another place where a plateau is commonly found is after the initial high tone of dependent clause verbs such as the following:

ákúthándiza 'when he is helping'; 'who is helping'
ndítáthándiza 'after I helped'

At the end of words, if the tones are HLH, a plateau is common:

mkámwíní 'son-in-law'
atsámúndá 'colonialists' (lit. 'owners of farmland')
kusíyáná 'difference'
kulémérá 'weight, being heavy'

However, there are exceptions; for example, in the word nyényezí 'star' the two tones are kept separate, so that the word is pronounced nyényēzī (where ī represents a slightly lower tone than í).

There are also certain tonal tense patterns (such as affirmative patterns 5 and 6 described below) where the two tones are kept separate even when the sequence is HLH:

ndi-nká-thandíza 'I was helping' (tone pattern 5)
ndí-ma-dyá 'I usually eat' (tone pattern 6)

No tonal plateau is possible when the underlying sequence of tones is HLLH, even when by spreading this becomes HHLH:

chizólówezí 'habit'

=== Tone-shifting ('bumping') ===
When a word or closely connected phrase ends in HHL or HLHL, there is a tendency in Chichewa for the second H to move to the final syllable of the word. This process is known as 'tone shifting' or 'bumping'. There are two types in which the second tone moves forward, local and non-local bumping. There is also reverse bumping, where the first tone moves backwards.

==== Local bumping ====
In 'local bumping' or 'local tone shift', LHHL at the end of a word or phrase becomes LHHH, where the two tones are joined into a plateau. This can happen when a final-tone word is followed by a possessive adjective, and also with the words ína 'other' and yénse/ónse 'all':

nyumbá + yánga > nyumbá yángá 'my house'
nyumbá + ína > nyumbá íná 'another house'
nyumbá + zónse > nyumbá zónsé 'all the houses'

In three-syllable words where HHL is due to the addition of an enclitic suffix such as -nso 'also, again', -di 'indeed' or -be 'still', the tones similarly change to HHH:

nsómbá-nso > nsómbá-nsó 'fish also'
a-ku-pítá-di > a-ku-pítá-dí 'he is indeed going'
a-ku-pítá-be > a-ku-pítá-bé 'he is still going'

Tone shift also happens in verbs when the verb would otherwise end with LHHL:

a-ná-mú-pha > aná-mú-phá 'they killed him'

At the end of a sentence the final high tone may drop again, reverting the word to a-ná-mú-pha.

In pattern 5 and negative pattern 3a verbs (see below) there is a choice between making a plateau and treating the final tone as separate:

ndi-zí-píta > ndi-zí-pítá / ndi-zí-pitá 'I should be going'
si-ndi-ngá-ménye > si-ndi-ngá-ményé / si-ndi-ngá-menyé 'I can't hit'

There is no bumping in HHL words where the first syllable is derived from á 'of':

kwá-mbíri 'very much'
wá-ntchíto 'worker'

==== Non-local bumping ====
In another kind of tone-shift (called 'non-local bumping'), HLHL at the end of a word or phrase changes to HLLH or, with spreading of the first high tone, HHLH:

mbúzi yánga > mbúzí yangá / mbúzi yangá) 'my goat'
bánja lónse > bánjá lonsé 'the whole family'
chi-módzi-módzi > chi-módzi-modzí / chi-módzí-modzí 'in the same way'

But there is no bumping in tense-patterns 5 and 6 or negative pattern 3 when the tones at the end of the word are HLHL:

ndí-ma-píta 'I usually go'
si-ndi-ngá-thandíze 'I can't help'

==== Reverse bumping ====
A related phenomenon, but in reverse, is found when the addition of the suffix -tú 'really' causes a normally word-final tone to move back one syllable, so that LHH at the end of a word becomes HLH:

ndipité 'I should go' > ndipíte-tú 'really I should go'
chifukwá 'because' > chifúkwa-tú 'because in fact'

=== Enclitic suffixes ===
Certain suffixes, known as enclitics, add a high tone to the last syllable of the word to which they are joined. When added to a toneless word or a word ending in LL, this high tone can easily be heard:

Lilongwe > Lilongwé-nso 'Lilongwe also':

Bumping does not occur when an enclitic is added to a word ending HLL:

a-ku-thándiza 'he is helping' > a-ku-thándizá-be 'he's still helping'

But when an enclitic is combined with word which ends HL, there is local bumping, and the result is a plateau of three tones:

nsómba 'fish' > nsómbá-nsó 'the fish also'

When added to a word with final high tone, it raises the tone higher (in Central Region dialects, the rising tone on the first syllable of a word like nyŭmbá also disappears):

nyŭmbá > nyumbá-nso 'the house also'

Not all suffixes are tonally enclitic in this way. For example, when added to nouns or pronouns, the locative suffixes -ko, -ku, -po, -pa, -mo, -mu do not add a tone:

ku Lilongwe-ko 'there in Lilongwe'
paméne-pa 'on this spot here'
m'bókosi-mu 'inside this box'

However, when added to verbs, these same suffixes add an enclitic tone:

w-a-choká-po 'he's not at home' (lit. 'he has gone away just now')
nd-a-oná-mo 'I have seen inside it'

=== Proclitic prefixes ===
Conversely, certain prefixes place a high tone on the syllable which follows them. Prefixes of this kind are called 'proclitic' or 'post-accenting'. For example, the prefix ku- of the infinitive puts a tone on the syllable following:

ku-thándiza 'to help'

Other tenses of this type are described under affirmative tense patterns 4 and 8 below.

Object-markers such as -ndí- 'me' or -mú- 'him/her' etc. also become proclitic when added to an imperative or subjunctive. In a four or five-syllable verb, the tone of the object-marker is heard at the beginning of the verb and may spread:

mu-ndi-fótókozeré 'please explain to me'

In a three-syllable verb, the tones make a plateau:

ndi-thándízé-ni! 'help me!'
mu-ndi-thándízé 'could you help me?'

In a two-syllable verb, the second tone is lost:

mu-gwíre-ni! 'catch him!'

But in a one-syllable verb, the first tone remains on the object-marker and the second tone is lost:

ti-mú-phe! 'let's kill him!'

=== Tone deletion (Meeussen's Rule) ===
Meeussen's Rule is a process in several Bantu languages whereby a sequence HH becomes HL. This is frequent in verbs when a penultimate tone causes the deletion of a final tone:

ku-góná > ku-góna

A tone deleted by Meeussen's Rule can be replaced by spreading. Thus although ku-góna loses its final tone, the first tone can spread in a phrase such as ku-góná bwino 'to sleep well'.

An instance where Meeussen's Rule does not apply in Chichewa is when the aspect-marker -ká- 'go and' is added to a verb, for example: a-ná-ká-thandiza 'he went and helped'. So far from being deleted, this tone can itself spread to the next syllable, e.g. a-ná-ká-thándiza. The tone of an object-marker such as -mú- 'him' in the same position, however, is deleted by Meeussen's Rule and then replaced by spreading; it does not itself spread: a-ná-mú-thandiza 'he helped him'. In the Southern Region, the spreading does not occur, and the tones are a-ná-mu-thandiza.

=== Tone of consonants ===
Just as in English, where in a word like zoo or wood or now the initial voiced consonant has a low pitch compared with the following vowel, the same is true of Chichewa. Thus Trithart marks the tones of initial consonants such as [m], [n], [z], and [dz] in some words as Low.

However, an initial nasal consonant is not always pronounced with a low pitch. After a high tone it can acquire a high tone itself, e.g. wá ḿsodzi 'of the fisherman' The consonants n and m can also have a high tone when contracted from ndí 'and' or high-toned -mú-, e.g. ḿmakhálá kuti? (short for múmakhálá kuti?) 'where do you live?'.

In some Southern African Bantu languages such as Zulu a voiced consonant at the beginning of a syllable not only has a low pitch itself, but can also lower the pitch of all or part of the following vowel. Such consonants are known as 'depressor consonants'. The question of whether Chichewa has depressor consonants was first considered by Trithart (1976) and further by Cibelli (2012). According to data collected by Cibelli, a voiced or nasalised consonant does indeed have a small effect on the tone of a following vowel, making it a semitone or more lower; so that for example the second vowel of ku-gúla 'to buy' would have a slightly lower pitch than that of ku-kúla 'to grow' or ku-khála 'to sit'. When the vowel is toneless, the effect is less, but it seems that there is still a slight difference. The effect of depressor consonants in Chichewa, however, is much less noticeable than in Zulu.

== Lexical tones ==
Lexical tones are the tones of individual words. A high tone remains high, even though a word is used in different contexts.

=== Nouns ===
In the CBOLD Chichewa dictionary, about 36% of Chichewa nouns are toneless, 57% have one tone, and only 7% have more than one tone. When there is one tone, it is generally on one of the last three syllables. Nouns with a tone more than three syllables from the end are virtually all foreign borrowings, such as sékondale 'secondary school'.

Comparison with other Bantu languages shows that for the most part the tones of nouns in Chichewa correspond to the tones of their cognates in other Bantu languages, and are therefore likely to be inherited from an earlier stage of Bantu. An exception is that nouns which at an earlier period had HH (such as nsómba 'fish', from proto-Bantu *cómbá) have changed in Chichewa to HL by Meeussen's rule. Two-syllable nouns in Chichewa can therefore have the tones HL, LH, or LL, these three being about equally common, but (discounting the fact that LH words are usually in practice pronounced HH) there are no nouns with the underlying tones HH.

The class-prefix of nouns, such as (class 7) chi- in chikóndi 'love', or (class 3) m- in mténgo 'tree', is usually toneless. However, there are some exceptions such as chímanga 'maize', chíwindi 'liver'. The three nouns díso 'eye', dzíno 'tooth', and líwu 'sound or word' are irregular in that the high tone moves from the prefix to the stem in the plural, making masó, manó, and mawú respectively.

==== Toneless nouns ====
bambo 'father, gentleman'
Chakwera 'Chakwera' (surname)
chimfine 'a cold' (illness)
chingwe 'string, rope'
chinthu 'thing'
chipinda '(bed)room'
dera 'district'
dzanja 'hand' (pl. manja 'hands')
fungo (no plural) 'smell'
funso 'question'
ganizo 'thought, idea'
gulu 'group'
kabudula 'pair of shorts'
kamwa 'mouth'
khomo 'door, doorway'
lamulo 'law, rule'
Lilongwe 'Lilongwe'
khalidwe 'behaviour'
magazi 'blood'
magetsi 'electricity'
maliro 'funeral'
manda 'graveyard'
mayeso 'exam'
mbale 'plate'
mbewa 'mouse'
mfuti 'gun'
mkaka 'milk'
mlimi 'farmer'
mowa 'beer'
moyo 'life' (pl. miyoyo 'lives')
mpando 'chair'
mpeni 'knife'
mphunzitsi 'teacher'
mpira 'ball, football'
msewu 'road'
msika 'market'
msonkhano 'meeting'
mtengo 'price'
mtsogoleri 'leader'
mtundu 'kind, type, colour'
mudzi 'village'
Mulungu 'God'
munthu 'person' (pl. anthu 'people')
mwambo 'custom, tradition'
mwayi 'good luck'
mwendo 'leg' (pl. miyendo 'legs')
mzinda 'city'
mzungu 'European, white man'
ndodo 'stick'
ndondomeko 'programme, system'
ng'ombe 'cow, ox'
njala 'hunger'
njira 'path'
njovu 'elephant'
nkhanza 'cruelty'
nyama 'animal, meat'
nyengo 'season'
nyerere 'ant(s)'
pemphero 'prayer'
phunziro 'lesson'
thumba 'pocket'
thupi 'body'
tsamba 'leaf, page' (pl. masamba 'vegetables')
tsoka 'bad luck'
yankho 'answer'

Foreign borrowings also occasionally have this intonation:

bomba 'bomb' (Port. bomba)
chipatala 'hospital' (from English hospital, Afrikaans hospitaal or Port. hospital, via Shona)
damu 'dam, fishpond'
fomu (folomu) 'form' (in school)
juzi 'jersey, pullover' (cf. Shona júzi, jézi)
Katolika 'Catholic' (Port. católica)
ngalande 'irrigation canal'
poto 'cooking-pot'
saka 'sack' (from Eng. sack, Afr. sak, or Port. saca, saco)

==== Nouns with final tone ====
In isolation these words are usually pronounced bwālō, Chichēwā, etc., ending with two tones of mid height. Alternatively, in some dialects, at the end of a phrase they may be pronounced bwălò, Chichĕwà, with a rising tone on the penultimate and a low tone on the final. When the suffix -o 'that' (varying according to the noun class) is added, the tone becomes a normal penultimate tone, e.g. nyumbá-yo 'that house', mundá-wo 'that garden', making the tone easy to hear.

In this article the final tone is written as a final tone, even though in practice it may be pronounced in different ways.

bwaló 'open area, court'
chaká 'year' (pl. zaká 'years')
chalá 'finger, toe'
Chichewá 'Chichewa'
chifukwá 'reason'
chinangwá 'cassava'
Chinyanjá 'Chinyanja'
chipongwé 'rudeness'
chiswé 'termite(s)'
fumbí 'dust'
galú 'dog'
kalulú 'hare, rabbit'
katswirí 'expert'
khondé 'verandah'
khutú 'ear'
kunjá 'outside'
likodzó 'bilharzia'
liwú 'sound; word'
lusó 'skill'
madzí 'water'
madzuló '(late) afternoon, evening'
maló 'place'
manó 'teeth'
manthá 'fear, anxiety'
manyazí 'shame, embarrassment'
masó 'eyes'
mawú 'word, voice'
m'balé 'relative, brother'
mchimwené 'brother'
mlandú 'court case'
mlendó 'stranger, guest'
mmawá 'morning'
mnyamatá (also mnyámata) 'boy'
mphaká 'cat'
mtanthauziramawú 'dictionary'
mtedzá 'groundnuts'
mundá 'garden (for maize or other crops)'
mutú 'head'
mvuú 'hippopotamus'
mwalá 'stone'
mwaná 'child'
mwezí 'moon, month'
mwiní 'owner of' (pl. ení)
ndendé 'prison'
nduná 'minister (of government)'
ngongolé 'loan'
njingá 'bicycle'
nsalú 'cloth'
nyaní 'baboon'
nyanjá 'lake'
nyumbá 'house'
nzerú (pl.) 'wisdom, intelligence'
pansí 'ground, floor'
phazí 'foot' (pl. mapazí 'feet')
tsogoló 'future, front'
ubwinó 'advantage, goodness'
udzudzú 'mosquito(es)'
ufá 'flour'
ufulú 'freedom'
ulendó 'journey'
utá 'bow'
Zombá 'Zomba'

Foreign borrowings with this intonation are uncommon:

belú 'bell'
bulú 'donkey' (Port. burro)
kamá 'bed' (Port. cama)
mangó 'mango(es)' (sing. bangó)

==== Nouns with penultimate tone ====
Bánda 'Banda' (personal name)
bála 'wound'
bánja 'family'
bódza 'lie'
bóma 'government'
búngwe 'organisation'
chikóndi 'love'
chitsánzo 'example'
chithúnzi 'picture'
díso 'eye' (pl. masó 'eyes')
dzíko 'country' (pl. maíko 'countries')
dzína 'name' (pl. maína 'names')
dzíno 'tooth' (pl. manó 'teeth')
dzúngu 'pumpkin' (pl. maúngu 'pumpkins')
dzúwa 'the sun'
gúle 'dance'
katúndu 'goods, luggage'
khólo 'parent' (pl. makólo 'parents')
mafúta 'oil'
Maláwi 'Malawi'
mankhwála 'medicine'
maténda 'disease'
máyi 'mother, woman'
mbáli 'side'
mbéwu 'seed, crop'
mbúsa 'herdsman, church minister'
mbúzi 'goat'
mfíti 'witch'
mfúmu 'chief'
mímba 'belly'
mkángo 'lion'
mkázi 'wife'
mkéka 'palm-leaf mat'
mkúlu 'official'
mnzánga, mnzáke 'my friend, his friend'
móto 'fire'
mpíngo 'church, congregation'
mphámvu (pl.) 'strength'
mphátso 'gift'
mténgo 'tree'
mtíma 'heart'
mtsínje 'river'
mvúla 'rain'
mwamúna 'man'
ndíwo (pl.) 'relish'
nkháni 'story, news'
nkhúku 'chicken, hen'
nsíma 'cooked maize flour'
nsómba 'fish'
ntchíto 'work'
ntháwi 'time'
nyímbo 'song'
tsíku 'day' (plural masíku)
usíku 'night' (no plural)
vúto 'problem'

There are also many foreign borrowings with this tone, such as the following:

ádyo 'garlic' (Port. alho)
asilikáli 'soldiers' (Swahili askari, via Yao)
báfa 'bathroom'
bánki 'bank'
bási 'bus'
búku (búkhu) 'book'
bulédi 'bread'
bwána 'boss' (Swahili bwana)
chingerézi 'English language' (Port. inglês)
chipáni 'political party' (Afrikaans span 'team of oxen', via Shona)
dirési 'dress'
feteréza 'fertiliser'
fódya 'tobacco' (Port. folha)
fóni 'phone'
gányu 'piece-work' (Port. ganho)
hotéra 'hotel'
kachásu 'spirits (drink)' (Port. cachaça)
kanéma 'television, cinema' (Eng. kinema)
khánsa 'cancer'
khóti 'law-court'
kilomíta 'kilometre'
kíyi 'key'
chingerézi 'English language' (Port. inglês)
masámu 'maths' (Eng. sum)
mbendéra 'flag' (Port. bandera)
ndaláma 'money' (Arabic dirham)
óla 'hour' (Port. hora)
papáya 'papaya' (Port. papaia)
shúga 'sugar'
sikúmba 'anorak' (Zulu isikhumba)
sitíma 'train, ship'
sitólo 'store, shop'
sópo 'soap'
sukúlu 'school'
tíyi 'tea'
tomáto 'tomato(es)'
wíndo 'window'
zenéra 'window' (Port. janela)

The following words are pronounced with the same ending as kíyi and tíyi:

komiti (pronounced komitíyi) 'committee'
takisi (pronounced taksíyi) 'taxi'

==== Nouns with antepenultimate tone ====
búluzi 'lizard'
chímanga 'maize'
chíwindi 'liver'
káchisi 'shrine, temple'
khwángwala 'crow'
maséwero 'sport'
mbálame 'bird'
mndándanda 'row, list'
mphépete 'side, edge'
mpóngozi 'mother-in-law'
msúngwana 'teenage girl'
msúweni 'cousin'
mtsíkana 'girl'
námwali 'initiate'
njénjete 'house-cricket'
síng'anga 'traditional doctor'

This group is less common than the first three. Many of the words with this tone are loanwords from Portuguese or English such as:

ápozi 'apple'
bókosi 'box; coffin'
bótolo 'bottle'
chitókosi 'jail' (Eng. 'stocks', via Shona chitókisi)
dótolo 'doctor' (Port. doutor)
jékete 'jacket'
kálata 'letter' (Port. carta)
kándulo 'candle'
khítchini 'kitchen'
kóndomu 'condom'
mákina 'machine' (Port. máquina)
masipéyala 'spare parts'
matímati 'small tomatoes' (Port. tomate)
mbátata 'sweet potatoes' (Port. batata)
mbatátesi 'potatoes' (Port. batatas)
Muthárika 'Mutharika' (surname, from Lomwe)
nsápato 'shoe(s)' (Port. sapato)
ófesi 'office'
pépala 'paper'
pétulo 'petrol'
tchálitchi 'church'
tébulo 'table'
úvuni 'oven'

The antepenultimate high tone in words such as njénjete and kóndomu spreads to the following n.

==== Tone four syllables from the end ====
In foreign borrowings the tone may come four syllables from the end. In the first four words below, the vowel following the tone is an epenthetic one, added to make the word easier to pronounce. When the added vowel is u or i (as in láputopu 'laptop' or íntaneti 'internet') it tends to be very short or barely pronounced:

dókotala 'doctor'
láputopu 'laptop computer'
Mángalande 'England'
pulógalamu 'programme'
sékondale 'secondary school'

Where the second vowel is i, however, the tone spreads:

kámísolo 'bra'
málíkisi 'marks'
míníbasi 'minibus'
pínífolo 'apron'
puláyímale 'primary school'
thilánsípoti 'transport expenses'
wáyílesi (wáílesi) 'radio'
wílíbara 'wheelbarrow'

In the following compound nouns the tone of the second element (bóyi 'boy', móto 'fire' and bédi 'bed') is lost:

hédíboyi 'head boy'
gálímoto 'car'
shítíbedi 'bedsheet'

The tone of the second element is also lost in the following word, which is derived from mfúmu yáíkázi 'female chief':

mfúmúkazi 'queen'

Of similar intonation is the following, in which -péń- is equivalent to two syllables:

kalipéńtala 'carpenter'

Similar are the following, which have the tone five syllables from the end:

kásítomala 'customer'
íńtaneti 'internet'

==== Nouns with two tones ====
Nouns which are compounded with the associative prefix á 'of', which has a high tone, can also have two tones, one on á and the other on the noun itself:

wántchíto 'worker' (from wá + ntchíto)
wángongolé 'creditor'

Where the tones are separated by a single toneless syllable, the two tones form a plateau:

wápólísi 'policeman' (from wá + polísi)
wámádzí 'water-seller' (from wá + madzí)
wákúbá 'thief'
chákúdyá 'food'
Láchíwíri 'Tuesday'

When á is prefixed to the infinitive of a verb of more than one syllable, the á and ku- usually coalesce into the vowel ó:

Lólémba 'Monday' (from lá + ku-lémba, 'day of writing')
Lówéruka 'Saturday'
wódwála 'sick person'
wóphúnzira 'pupil'
zófúnda 'bedclothes'
zóóna 'truth'

The prefix chi- in some words adds two high tones, one following chi- and one on the final. The first may spread forwards and the second backwards, but the two tones are kept separate with the second lower than the first:

chizólowezí or chizólówezí 'habit, custom'
chilákolakó 'desire'
chipwírikití 'riot'
chithúnzithunzí 'picture'
chitsékereró 'stopper'
chivúndikiró 'lid'
chiwóngoleró 'steering-wheel'

If there are only three syllables following the prefix chi-, the two tones link into an HHH plateau:

chikwángwání 'banner, sign'
chipólówé 'violence, riot'

The (L)HHH pattern is also found in a few other words (mostly compounds):

kusíyáná 'difference'
lálánjé 'orange' (Portuguese laranja)
masómphényá 'vision'
mkámwíní 'son-in-law'
tsábólá 'pepper'
atsámúndá 'colonialists'
matálálá 'hailstones'
mgónéró 'supper'
nankálízí 'scorpion'

A triple tone is also found in:

bírímánkhwe 'chameleon'
gúlúgúfe 'butterfly, moth'
mbíyáng'ámbe 'drunkard'
nkhúkúndémbo 'turkey' (bird)

It is also found in some borrowed words:

bulákíbólodi 'blackboard'
gólókípa 'goalkeeper'
hédímásitala 'headmaster'
nyúzípépala 'newspaper'

The following nouns have two separate tones and no plateau. The second tone is lower than the first:

nyényezí (also nyényezi) 'star'
kángachépe 'small bribe, tip' (lit. 'though it may be little')

=== Adjectives ===
Adjectives in Chichewa are usually formed with the word á (wá, yá, chá, zá, kwá etc. according to noun class) 'of', known as the 'associative prefix', which has a high tone:

wá-bwino 'good'
wá-tsópánó 'new'

When there is a sequence of HLH, the tones will bridge to make HHH:

wá-kálé 'old'

The seven double-prefix adjectives (-múna 'male', -kázi 'female', -táli 'long', -fúpi 'short', -wísi 'fresh', -kúlu 'big', -ng'óno 'small' all have penultimate tone. The first three syllables in these adjectives are bridged into a plateau:

munthu wá-ḿtáli 'a tall man'
nyumbá yá-íkúlu 'a big house'
mwaná wá-ḿkázi 'female child'
mwaná wá-mwámúna 'male child'

Combined with an infinitive, á and ku- usually merge (except usually in monosyllabic verbs) into a high-toned ó-:

wó-ípa 'bad'
wó-pénga 'mad'
wó-dwála 'sick'
wá-kúbá 'thieving; thief'

Some speakers make a slight dip between the two tones:

wô-dúla 'expensive'

Combined with a negative infinitive, the adjective has a tone on the penultimate. The tones do not bridge into a plateau:

wó-sa-mvéra 'disobedient'

Possessive adjectives are also made with á-. As explained in the section on bumping, their tone may change when they follow a noun ending in HL, LH or HH. The concords shown below are for noun classes 1 and 2:

wánga 'my'
wáko 'your'
wáke 'his, her, its (also 'their' of non-personal possessors)
wáthu 'our'
wánu 'your' (of you plural, or polite)
wáo 'their' (or 'his, her' in polite speech)

The adjective wína 'another, a certain' has similar tones to wánga 'my':

wína (plural éna) 'another, a certain'

The adjective wamba 'ordinary', however, is not made with á and has a low tone on both syllables. The first syllable wa in this word does not change with the class of noun:

munthu wamba 'an ordinary person'
anthu wamba 'ordinary people'

=== Pronominal adjectives ===
The following three adjectives have their own concords and are not formed using á. Here they are shown with the concords of classes 1 and 2:

yénse (plural ónse) 'all of'
yémwe (plural ómwe) 'himself'
yékha (plural ókha) 'only'

As with possessives, the high tone of these may shift by bumping after a noun or adjective ending in HL or LH or HH.

madengu ááng'ónó onsé 'all the small baskets'
ndalámá zangá zónsé 'all my money'

With these three the high tone also shifts before a demonstrative suffix:

yemwé-yo 'that same one'
zonsé-zi 'all these'.

In this they differ from wánga and wína, which do not shift the tone with a demonstrative suffix, e.g. anthu éna-wa 'these other people'. The tone also shifts in the word for 'each', in which áli has the tones of a relative-clause verb.

álí-yensé / álíyénsé 'everyone'

The following demonstrative adjectives (shown here with the concords for noun classes 1 and 2) usually have a low tone:

uyo (plural awo) 'that one'
uyu (plural awa) 'this one'
uno (plural ano) 'this one we're in'
uja (plural aja) 'that one you mentioned'
uti? (plural ati?) 'which one?'

The last of these, however, usually has an intonational tone after ndi 'is':

msewu ndi úti? 'which is the road?'

The first of these, uyo, can be pronounced úyo! with a high tone if referring to someone a long way away.

=== Numbers ===
Chichewa has the numbers 1 to 5 and 10. These all have penultimate high tone except for -sanu 'five', which is toneless. The adjectives meaning 'how many?' and 'several' also take the number concords and can be considered part of this group. They are here illustrated with the concords for noun classes 1 and 2 (khúmi 'ten' has no concord):

munthu mmódzi 'one person'
anthu awíri 'two people'
anthu atátu 'three people'
anthu anáyi 'four people'
anthu asanu 'five people' (toneless)
anthu asanu ndí ḿmódzi 'six people'
anthu asanu ndí áwíri 'seven people'
anthu khúmi 'ten people'
anthu makúmí awíri 'twenty people'
anthu angáti? 'how many people?'
anthu angápo 'several people'

The numbers zaná '100' (plural mazaná) and chikwí '1000' (plural zikwí) exist but are rarely used. It is possible to make other numbers using circumlocutions (e.g. 'five tens and units five and two' = 57) but these are not often heard, the usual practice being to use English numbers instead.

=== Personal pronouns ===
The first and second person pronouns are toneless, but the third person pronouns have a high tone:

ine 'I'
iwe 'you sg.'
iyé 'he, she'
ife 'we'
inu 'you pl., you (polite)'
iwó 'they, he/she (polite)'

These combine with ndi 'am, is, are' as follows:

ndine 'I am'
ndiyé 'he is' (etc.)
síndine 'I am not'
síndíyé 'he is not' (also 'surely')

=== Monosyllables ===
The following monosyllabic words are commonly used. The following are toneless:

ndi 'it is, they are'
ku 'in, to, from'
pa 'on, at'
mu (m') 'in'

The following have a high tone:

á (also wá, yá, zá, kwá etc. according to noun class) 'of'
ndí 'with, and'
sí 'it isn't'

These words are joined rhythmically to the following word. The high tone can spread to the first syllable of the following word, provided it has at least three syllables: They can also make a plateau with the following word, if the tones are HLH:

Lilongwe 'Lilongwe' > á Lílongwe 'of Lilongwe'
pemphero 'prayer' > ndí pémphero 'with a prayer'
Maláwi > á Máláwi 'of Malawi'

When pa is a preposition meaning 'on' or 'at', it is usually toneless:

pa bédi 'on the bed, in bed'

But pá has a tone when it means 'of' following a noun of class 16:

pansí pá bédi 'underneath (of) the bed'

It also has a tone in certain idiomatic expressions such as pá-yekha or pá-yékha 'on his own'.

=== Ideophones ===
The tones of ideophones (expressive words) have also been investigated by linguists. Examples are: bálálábálálá 'scattering in all directions' (all syllables very high), lólolo 'lots and lots' (with gradually descending tones). The tonal patterns of ideophones do not necessarily conform to the patterns of other words in the language.

=== Lexical tones of verbs ===
Chichewa verbs are mostly toneless in their basic form, although a few have a high tone (usually on the final vowel). However, unlike the situation with the lexical tones of nouns, there is no correlation at all between the high-toned verbs in Chichewa and the high-toned verbs in other Bantu languages. The obvious conclusion is that the high tones of verbs are not inherited from an earlier stage of Bantu but have developed independently in Chichewa.

When a verbal extension is added to a high-toned root, the resulting verb is also usually high-toned, e.g.

goná 'sleep' > gonaná 'sleep together'

Certain extensions, especially those which change a verb from transitive to intransitive, or which make it intensive, also add a tone. According to Kanerva (1990) and Mchombo (2004), the passive ending -idwa/-edwa also adds a high tone, but this appears to be true only of the Nkhotakota dialect which they describe.

High-toned verb roots are comparatively rare (only about 13% of roots), though the proportion rises when verbs with stative and intensive extensions are added. In addition there are a number of verbs, such as peza/pezá 'find' which can be pronounced either way. In the monolingual dictionary Mtanthauziramawu wa Chinyanja 2683 verbs are given, with 10% marked as high-toned, and 4% as having either tone. In the Southern Region of Malawi, some speakers do not pronounce the tones of high-toned verbs at all or only sporadically.

The difference between high and low-toned verbs is neutralised when they are used in a verb tense which has a high tone on the penultimate or on the final syllable.

Three irregular verbs have a tone on the penultimate syllable:

-téro 'do so'
-tére 'do like this'
-táni? 'do what?

The view held in Mtenje (1986) that Chichewa also has 'rising-tone' verbs has been dropped in his more recent work.

==== Low-toned verbs ====
bwera 'come'
chita 'do'
choka 'go away'
dziwa 'know'
fika 'arrive'
fotokoza 'explain'
funa 'want'
funsa 'ask'
ganiza 'think'
gula 'buy'
gulitsa 'sell'
gwira 'take hold of'
imba 'sing'
khala 'sit, live'
kumana 'meet'
lankhula/yankhula 'speak'
lemba 'write'
lowa 'enter'
mwalira 'die'
nena 'say'
ona 'see'
panga 'do, make'
patsa 'give (someone)'
pereka 'hand over'
pita 'go'
seka 'laugh'
sintha 'change'
tenga 'take'
thandiza 'help'
uza 'tell'
vala 'put on (clothes)'
vuta 'be difficult'
yamba 'begin'
yankha 'answer'
yenda 'go, walk'

==== Monosyllabic verbs ====
Monosyllabic verbs such as the following are all low-toned, although the derived nouns imfá 'death' and chigwá 'valley' have a tone:

-ba 'steal'
-da 'be dark, be black'
-dya 'eat'
-fa 'die'
-gwa 'fall'
-kha 'leak'
-mva 'hear'
-mwa 'drink'
-nga 'be like, resemble'
-pha 'kill'
-psa 'be ripe, cooked'
-swa 'break'
-tha 'finish, be able'
-thwa 'be sharp'
-ya 'be deep'

There are also two irregular monosyllabic verbs ending in -i:

-li 'be'
-ti 'say'

==== High-toned verbs ====
bisá 'hide (something)'
bisalá 'be hidden'
dabwá 'be surprised'
dandaulá 'complain'
goná 'sleep'
iwalá 'forget'
kaná 'refuse'
kondá 'love'
lakwá 'be in error'
lepherá 'fail'
phunzirá 'learn'
siyá 'leave'
tayá 'throw away'
thamangá 'run'
topá 'be tired'
tsalá 'remain'
vulalá 'be wounded'
yenerá 'ought'
zimá / thimá 'go out (of fire or lights)'

==== Verbs with either tone ====
ipá 'be bad'
khotá 'be bent'
kwiyá 'be angry'
namá 'tell a lie'
pewá 'avoid'
pezá 'find'
sowá 'miss, be missing'
thokozá 'thank'
yabwá 'irritate, make itch'

==== Stative verbs ====
Most intransitive verbs with the endings -iká, -eká, -uká, -oká derived from simpler verb-stems are high-toned. This is especially true when a transitive verb has been turned by a suffix into an intransitive one:

chitiká 'happen' (cf. chita 'do')
duká 'be cut' (cf. dula 'cut')
dziwiká 'be known' (cf. dziwa 'know')
funiká 'be necessary' (cf. funa 'want')
masuká 'be at ease' (cf. masula 'free')
mveká 'be understood' (cf. mva 'hear')
onongeká 'be damaged' (cf. ononga 'damage')
theká 'be possible' (cf. tha 'finish, manage to')
thyoká 'be broken' (cf. thyola 'break')
uluká 'fly; be revealed' (cf. ulula 'reveal')
vutiká 'be in difficulty' (cf. vutitsa 'cause a problem for')

However, there are some common exceptions, such as the following, which are low-toned:

oneka 'seem' (cf. ona 'see')
tuluka 'come out, emerge' (cf. tula 'remove a burden')

The ending -ika / -eka is also low-toned when it has a transitive meaning, unless the underlying verb has a high tone:

imika 'park (a car)' (cf. ima 'stand')
goneká 'put to bed (e.g. in hospital)' (cf. goná 'lie down, sleep')

==== Intensive verbs ====
Intensive verbs with the endings -(its)-itsá and -(ets)-etsá always have a high tone on the final syllable, even when derived from low-toned verbs. A few intensive verbs with the endings -irirá or -ererá are also high-toned:

funitsitsá 'to want very much' (cf. funa 'want')
onetsetsá 'inspect' (cf. ona 'see')
mvetsetsá 'understand well' (cf. mva 'hear')
menyetsá 'beat severely' (cf. menya 'hit')
yang'anitsitsá 'examine carefully' (cf. yang'ana 'look at')
yesetsá 'try hard' (cf. yesa 'try')
pitirirá 'go further' (cf. pita 'go')
psererá 'be overcooked' (cf. psa 'burn, be ripe')

== Grammatical tones of verbs ==
=== Affirmative tonal patterns ===
Each tense in Chichewa is associated with a particular tonal pattern, which is the same for every verb in that tense, allowing for adjustments when the verb has only one or two syllables. The numbers here followed for the affirmative tenses are those given in Downing & Mtenje (2017). Hyphens and accents are added for clarity; they are not part of standard Chichewa or Chinyanja orthography.

==== Pattern 1 (-a-) ====
The following tenses are toneless:

nd-a-thandiza 'I have helped' (Perfect)
ndi-nga-thandize 'I can help' (Potential)
ndi-ka-thandiza 'if/when I help' (ka-Conditional)
pa-chi-panda iyé 'if it were not for him'

Also toneless is the bare imperative, which is dealt with in a separate section below:

thandiza! 'help!'

If the verb stem has a high tone, the tone can easily be heard on the final syllable:

nd-a-thamangá 'I have run'

When an object-marker such as -mú- 'him'/'her' is added, its tone can easily be heard. The tone may optionally spread in verbs of 3 syllables or more:

nd-a-mú-fotokozera / nd-a-mú-fótokozera 'I have explained to him'
nd-a-mú-thandiza / nd-a-mú-thándiza 'I have helped him'
nd-a-mú-ona 'I have seen him'
nd-a-mú-pha 'I have killed him'

In a high-toned verb there is a tone on the final syllable of the verb. In a two-syllable verb it makes a plateau with the tone of the object-marker:

nd-a-mú-pézá 'I have found him'

In most dialects, the reflexive marker -dzí- has the same tones as -mú-. But some speakers, for example in Nkhotakota, -dzí- adds an extra tone on the penultimate, making pattern 5:

nd-a-dzí-thándiza 'I have helped myself' (Lilongwe)
nd-a-dzí-thandíza 'I have helped myself' (Nkhotakota)

==== Pattern 2 (-é) ====
In this pattern there is a tone on the final vowel. The main tense with this pattern is the present subjunctive. The final vowel changes to -e:

ndi-fotokozé 'I should explain'
ndi-thandizé 'I should help'
ndi-oné 'I should see'
ndi-dyé 'I should eat'

The same tones are heard when the aspect-marker -ká- 'go and' or -dzá- 'come and' are added to the imperative. The aspect-marker itself becomes toneless:

ka-thandizé 'go and help!'
dza-oné 'come and see!'

If an object-marker such as -mú- 'him, her' is added, the tone of the object-marker is heard on the syllable following the object-marker, except in monosyllabic verbs. In three-syllable verbs, the two tones link into a plateau. In one- and two-syllable verbs, the final tone is deleted by Meeussen's Rule:

ndi-mu-fótokozeré / ndi-mu-fótókozeré 'I should explain to him'
ndi-mu-thándízé 'I should help him'
ndi-mu-óne 'I should see him'
ndi-mú-phe 'I should kill him'

Similarly, if an object-marker is added to an imperative, there is a tone after the object-marker:

mu-thándízé 'help him!'
ka-mu-thándízé 'go and help him!'
dza-mu-óne 'come and see him!'

But if the aspect-marker -ká- 'go and' or -dzá- 'come and' are added to the subjunctive, the tones change to pattern 5 (see below):

ndi-ká-thandíze 'I should go and help'
ndi-ká-mu-thandíze 'I should go and help him'

When negative, the subjunctive has the infix -sa-, and the tone is on the penultimate, except in monosyllabic verbs (see negative pattern 2 below). All other tones, such as that of the object-marker, are deleted:

ndi-sa-thandíze 'I should not help'
ndi-sa-mu-thandíze 'I should not help him'

But if the aspect-marker -má- is added to the negative, the tones change to pattern 5:

mu-sa-má-thandíze 'you should never help'
mu-sa-má-mu-thandíze 'you should never help him'

==== Pattern 3 (-ná-, -dá-) ====
In this pattern, there is a tone on the tense-marker itself. In some dialects this tone spreads, when the verb has three or more syllables. The remote perfect (simple past) tense can be made with -ná- or -dá- (-dá- being preferred in writing:

ndi-ná-fotokoza / ndi-ná-fótokoza 'I explained, I have explained'
ndi-ná-thandiza / ndi-ná-thándiza 'I helped'
ndi-ná-ona 'I saw'
ndi-ná-dya 'I ate'

When the aspect-marker -ká- 'go and', or an object-marker such as -mú-, is added, it has a tone. The tone of -ká- can spread, but the tone of an object-marker does not spread:

ndi-ná-ká-thándiza 'I went and helped'
ndi-ná-mú-thandiza 'I helped him'

When the verb is monosyllabic, the tones are as follows. The tone of -ká- remains stable, but the tone of -mú- is bumped to the final:

ndi-ná-ká-pha 'I went and killed'
ndi-ná-mú-phá 'I killed him'

The negative form of the tense is made with the prefix sí-, the tone of which spreads; there is also a tone on the penultimate. The final vowel changes to -e:

sí-ndí-na-fotokóze 'I didn't explain'
sí-ndí-na-thandíze 'I didn't help'
sí-ndí-na-óne 'I didn't see'
sí-ndí-na-dyé 'I didn't eat'

Another tense with this pattern is the Perfect Potential. This can be made with -kadá-, -kaná-, or sometimes -daká-:

ndi-kadá-thandiza / ndi-kadá-thándiza 'I would have helped'

==== Pattern 4 (-ku-) ====
In pattern 4, the tone is right-shifted or proclitic, and is heard on the syllable following the tense-marker. A typical tense with this tone pattern is the Present Continuous:

ndi-ku-fótokoza 'I am explaining'
ndi-ku-thándiza 'I am helping'
ndi-ku-bwéra 'I am coming'
ndi-ku-dyá 'I am eating'

If the verb is monosyllabic, the tone sometimes spreads backwards or regresses to the penultimate:

ndi-ku-dyá (also pronounced ndi-kú-dyá or ndi-kú-dya) 'I am eating'

Other tenses in this pattern are the Imperfect and the Recent Past, the infinitive, and tenses which include the infix -ta-:

ndi-ma-thándiza 'I was helping'
ndi-na-thándiza 'I helped (today)' (Recent Past)
ku-thándiza 'to help'
ta-thándiza! 'help (at once)!'
n'-ta-thándiza! 'let me help!'

The pattern is also found when the aspect-marker -ngo- 'just' is added to a toneless tense:

i-ngo-thándiza! 'just help!'
ndi-ka-ngo-thándiza 'if I just help'

However, when -ngo- 'just' is added to other tenses, there are tones before and after -ngo- (pattern 8):

ndi-kú-ngo-thándiza 'I am just helping'
ndi-má-ngo-thándiza 'I was just helping'
ndí-má-ngo-thándiza 'I usually just help'

When an object-marker or the aspect-marker -ká- or -dzá- is added to tenses in this pattern or pattern 8, an extra tone is heard. In 4 or 5-syllable verbs this second tone is heard on the penultimate, in three-syllable verbs on the final, in two-syllable verbs on the final with a plateau. In one-syllable verbs it disappears. The first tone can spread in longer verbs:

ndi-ku-mú-fótokozéra / ndi-ku-mú-fotokozéra 'I am explaining to him'
ndi-ku-mú-thándizá / ndi-ku-mú-thandizá 'I am helping him'
ndi-ku-mú-ményá 'I am hitting him'
ndi-ku-mú-pha 'I am killing him'

But when -má- is added to -ku-, the tones change to pattern 5:

ndi-ku-má-thandíza 'I am always helping'
ku-má-thandíza 'to be regularly helping'

The negative of the Present Continuous, Imperfect, and Recent Past remains in the same pattern but with the addition of sí- at the beginning. The tone of sí- spreads to the subject-marker:

sí-ndí-ku-thándiza 'I am not helping'
sí-ndí-ma-thándiza 'I was not helping'
sí-ndí-na-thándiza 'I did not help (just now)' (rarely used)

The negative infinitive, on the other hand, has negative tone pattern 2:

ku-sa-thandíza 'not to help'

==== Pattern 5 (-nká-) ====
In this pattern there is a tone on the tense-marker and on the penultimate. The first tone does not spread, but there is a fall to a low tone after it. The second tone is lower in pitch than the first. In a two-syllable verb, the second tone is 'bumped' to the final, and there may either be a plateau, or the two tones may be separate. In a monosyllabic verb, the second tone is lost by Meeussen's Rule. An example of this pattern is the Remote Imperfect with -nká-:

ndi-nká-fotokóza 'I used to explain, I was explaining (in the past)'
ndi-nká-thandíza 'I used to help, I was helping'
ndi-nká-ményá / ndi-nká-menyá 'I used to hit, I was hitting'
ndi-nká-dya 'I used to eat, I was eating'

Other tenses with this pattern are the subjunctives with -zí-, -dzá- and -ká-, various tenses with the aspect-marker -má-, and tenses with negative pattern 3a (see below):

ndi-zí-thandíza 'I should be helping'
ndi-dzá-thandíze 'I should help (later)'
ndi-ká-thandíze 'I should help (there)'
ndi-ka-má-thandíza 'whenever I help'
ku-má-thandíza 'to be helping, to help regularly'
ndi-ku-má-thandíza 'I'm always helping'
si-ndi-ngá-thandíze 'I can't help'

Also included in this group is the Continuative Subjunctive, but because the tense-marker has two syllables, the tones in shorter verbs are slightly different from the above:

ndi-báa-thandíza 'I should help meanwhile'
ndi-báa-píta 'let me go meanwhile'
ndi-báa-dyá 'let me eat meanwhile'

The Continuative Subjunctive is also heard with tone pattern 9, i.e. with a single tone on the penultimate.

With all tenses in pattern 5, when an object-marker such as -mú- 'him/her' or the aspect-marker -ká- 'go and' is added, it loses its tone. A monosyllabic verb with an object-marker acts like a two-syllable verb that has no object-marker:

ndi-nká-mu-thandíza 'I used to help him'
ndi-nká-mu-ménya 'I used to hit him'
ndi-nká-zí-phá / ndi-nká-zi-phá 'I used to kill them'

In relative clauses and after ngati 'if', pattern 5 affirmative verbs change to pattern 6:

améné á-nka-thandíza 'who used to help, who was helping'

When negative, pattern 5 has various patterns according to the tense. The Remote Imperfect has three separate tones. The second is slightly lower than the first, and the third a little lower than the second:

sí-ndí-nká-thandíza 'I wasn't helping, I didn't use to help'

The negative Future Subjunctive has a single tone on the penultimate. All earlier tones are deleted:

ndi-sa-dza-thandíze 'I shouldn't help (in future)'
ndi-sa-ka-thandíze 'I shouldn't go and help'

The -zí- subjunctive has no direct negative, but the negative subjunctive with -má- is often used instead. It has pattern 5. The negative of the continuous infinitive also has pattern 5:

ndi-sa-má-thandíze 'I should never be helping'
ku-sa-má-thandíza 'never to be helping'

The Continuative Subjunctive has no negative.

==== Pattern 6 (-ma-) ====
The most common tense in this pattern is the Present Habitual, in which, just as with pattern 5, there is a sharp fall after the first tone, with no spreading:

ndí-ma-fotokóza 'I usually explain'
ndí-ma-thandíza 'I usually help'
ndí-ma-píta 'I usually go'
ndí-ma-dyá 'I usually eat'

The imperfective future tenses with -zi- are also in this pattern. (These should not be confused with the necessitative -zi- above, which has pattern 5.)

ndí-zi-thandíza 'I will be helping (soon)'
ndí-zi-dza-thandíza 'I will be helping (at a future time)'

Downing and Mtenje also include the Remote Past tense in this pattern, in which there are tones on the first two syllables:

ndí-ná-a-thandíza 'I had helped'

In relative clauses, because there is already a tone on the initial syllable, there is no change of tone.

When an object-marker such as -mú- or the aspect-marker -ká- 'go and' is added, it loses its tone, except in a one-syllable verb:

ndí-ma-mu-thandíza 'I usually help him'
ndí-ma-zí-dya 'I usually eat them'

When negative, the Present Habitual has negative pattern 4, in which the penultimate tone appears only when an object-marker is added, but the Remote Past has the penultimate tone even without an object-marker:

sí-ndí-má-thandiza 'I never usually help'
sí-ndí-má-mu-thandíza 'I never usually help him'
sí-ndí-náa-thandíza 'I had not helped' (rarely used)

==== Pattern 7 (-dzá-) ====
Downing and Mtenje's pattern 7 can also be divided into two varieties. The Present Simple (Near Future) has a tone on the subject-prefix which may spread if the verb has three or more syllables:

ndí-fotokoza / ndí-fótokoza 'I will explain' (near future)
ndí-thandiza / ndí-thándiza 'I will help'
ndí-pita 'I will go'
ndí-dya 'I will eat'

In the Remote Future (or Distant Future) and Contingent Future tenses there is usually a tone on the subject-marker and another on -dzá- (which may spread):

ndí-dzá-thandiza / ndí-dzá-thándiza 'I am going to help (in future)'
ndí-ká-thandiza / ndí-ká-thándiza 'I am going to help (when I get there)'

But some speakers pronounce these two tenses with a tone on the tense-marker only:

ndi-dzá-thandiza / ndi-dzá-thándiza 'I am going to help (in future)'
ndi-ká-thandiza / ndi-ká-thándiza 'I'm going to help' (today)

When an object-marker such as -mú- 'him, her' is added, it keeps its tone; but it does not spread. In a monosyllabic verb, the tone of the object-marker is not lost but is bumped to the final, with a plateau:

ndí-mú-thandiza 'I'll help him'
ndí-mú-menya 'I'll hit him'
ndí-mú-phá 'I'll kill him'

The tones are the same when -dzá- is added:

ndí-dzá-mú-thandiza 'I'm going to help him'
ndí-dzá-mú-menya 'I'm going to hit him'
ndí-dzá-mú-phá 'I'm going to kill him'

The negative of all three tenses has negative pattern 2, with a single tone on the penultimate, earlier tones being deleted:

si-ndi-mu-thandíza 'I am not going to help him' (near future)
si-ndi-dza-mu-thandíza 'I am not going to help him' (remote future)
si-ndi-ka-mu-thandíza 'I am not going to help him (there)' (contingent future)

==== Pattern 8 (-ngo-) ====
In this pattern there is a tone before and after the aspect-marker -ngo- (which itself always has a low tone):

ndí-ngo-thándiza 'I will just help'
ndi-kú-ngo-thándiza 'I am just helping'

The infix -ngo- always has this intonation with a tone before and after it, except when added to a toneless tense. In this case the first tone is absent:

nd-a-ngo-thándiza 'I have just helped'
ndi-ka-ngo-thándiza 'if I just help'
i-ngo-thándiza 'just help!'

Downing and Mtenje also include the following tense in this pattern, although it is slightly different, since the two tones usually join into a plateau:

ndí-tá-thándiza 'after I helped, having helped'

In this pattern, when an object-marker is added, the tones in the second half of the verb are the same as for pattern 4.

==== Pattern 9 (persistive -kada-) ====
Pattern 9 consists of a single tone on the penultimate (or final if the verb is monosyllabic). It is used for the Persistive tense with -kada- or -daka- (rare except with the verb -li); also for the imperatives prefixed by zi- and baa-:

ndi-kada-thandíza 'I am still helping'
ndi-kada-lí / ndi-ka-lí 'I am still'
zi-thandíza 'be helping'
baa-thandíza 'carry on helping meanwhile'

Forms like the following with chi-...-re also have this pattern:

áli chi-yimíre 'while he was standing' (cf. ku-íma 'to stand')
chi-yambíre-ni 'since beginning' (cf. ku-yámba 'to begin)
munthu wá-chi-kulíre 'an old person' (cf. ku-kúla 'to grow old')

=== Negative patterns ===
==== Negative pattern 1 ====
Under the heading negative pattern 1, Downing & Mtenje group together tenses which have the same tone pattern as the affirmative tense, apart from the addition of the negative-marker sí- (which has a doubled tone) at the beginning.

The following have the affirmative pattern 4 ending both when negative and affirmative. When negative they have in addition the prefix sí-, of which the tone spreads to the subject-marker:

sí-ndí-ku-thándiza 'I am not helping'
sí-ndí-ma-thándiza 'I was not helping'
sí-ndí-kú-ngo-thándiza 'I am just helping'

Another tense in this group is the Remote Imperfect (-nká-), which has three tones, the second of which is on the tense-marker itself and the third on the penultimate:

sí-ndí-nká-thandíza 'I didn't use to help, I wasn't helping (in the past)'

Mtenje adds the negatives of the Recent Past and the Remote Past, with final vowel -a. However, these are almost never found in modern standard Chichewa:

sí-ndí-na-thándiza 'I did not help (just now)'
sí-ndí-ná-a-thandíza 'I had not helped'

==== Negative pattern 2 ====
The negative pattern of this group is a single tone on the penultimate syllable (or final in a monosyllabic verb). This pattern is used for the negative near future:

si-ndi-fotokóza 'I won't explain'
si-ndi-thandíza 'I won't help'
si-ndi-píta 'I won't go'
si-ndi-dyá 'I won't eat'

Other negative tenses with this intonation are the Remote Future, negative subjunctive and future subjunctive, the negative infinitive, and the negative Perfect:

si-ndi-ka-thandíza 'I will not help'
ndi-sa-thandíze 'I should not help'
ndi-sa-dza-thandíze 'I should not help (later)'
ku-sa-thandíza 'not to help'
si-ndi-na-thandíze 'I have not helped (yet)'

All tones earlier in the verb (except for -má- and -zí-) are deleted, so when an object-marker is added, it too is toneless, unless the verb is monosyllabic:

si-ndi-na-mu-thandíze 'I have not helped him (yet)'
si-ndi-na-mu-thandízé-pó 'I have never helped him'

But -má-, -zí- and -ngá- add a tone, making pattern 5 (= negative pattern 3a):

si-ndi-zí-thandíza 'I will not be helping' (near future)
si-ndi-má-dza-thandíza 'I will not be helping' (remote future)
ku-sa-má-thandíza 'never to help'
si-ndi-ngá-thandíze 'I can't help'

When these tenses are used with a one-syllable verb the tone is normally heard on the final syllable:

si-ndi-dyá 'I won't eat'
ndi-sa-dyé 'I should not eat'
ku-sa-dyá 'not to eat'

But when the infix -dzá-, -ká-, -ná- is present, or an object-marker such as -mú- 'him, her', the tone is on that:

si-ndi-dzá-dya 'I am not going to eat'
si-ndi-ná-dye 'I haven't eaten yet'
ndi-sa-mú-phe 'I should not kill him'

==== Negative pattern 3a ====
Downing and Mtenje include two different patterns under the heading of negative pattern 3. One has tones on the tense or aspect-marker and the penultimate. The first tone does not spread, so that it resembles affirmative pattern 5. This pattern is found in the negative of the Present Potential, and also when the negative subjunctive, infinitive, and Remote Future have the continuous aspect-marker -má-:

si-ndi-ngá-thandíze 'I can't help' (first pronunciation)
ndi-sa-má-thandíze 'I shouldn't be helping'
ku-sa-má-thandíza 'not to be helping'
si-ndi-má-dza-thandíza 'I won't be helping'

==== Negative pattern 3b ====
The other pattern has tones on the initial syllable (which spreads) and penultimate, and so resembles affirmative pattern 6. This pattern is found in the negative of the Remote Perfect (Past Simple) and also as an alternative pronunciation of the negative Present Potential:

sí-ndí-na-thandíze 'I didn't help'
sí-ndí-nga-thandíze 'I can't help' (alternative pronunciation)

In both patterns, just as with affirmative patterns 5 and 6, when the aspect-marker -ká- 'go and' or an object-marker such as -mú- 'him, her' is added, it loses its tone.

==== Negative pattern 4 ====
In this pattern, the verb stem itself is toneless, unless an object-marker is added:

sí-ndí-thandiza 'I don't help'
sí-ndí-má-thandiza 'I never help'
sí-ndí-kadá-thandiza 'I wouldn't (or couldn't) have helped'

When an object-marker is added, there is a tone on the penultimate. The object-marker itself loses its tone:

sí-ndí-mu-thandíza 'I don't help him'
sí-ndí-má-mu-thandíza 'I never help him'
sí-ndí-kadá-mu-thandíza 'I wouldn't have helped him'

In monosyllabic verbs, in the Central Region, the tone on the subject-marker disappears in the Present Simple and the tones are:

sí-ndi-dya 'I don't eat'

=== Relative clause patterns ===
Certain tenses have a different tonal pattern when used in relative clauses. Stevick calls this intonation the 'relative mood' of the verb. Often the use of relative clause intonation alone, without a relative pronoun, can show that a verb is being used in the meaning of a relative clause. Mchombo gives the following example:

The same intonation patterns can also be found in some types of temporal, conditional, or concessive clause.

==== Relative pattern 1 ====
In some tenses the relative clause pattern is the same as the main clause pattern. This includes all affirmative tenses (including the Remote Future) which already have a high tone on the initial syllable, and all negative tenses, even those starting with a low tone. Downing & Mtenje refer to these as Relative tone pattern 1.

==== Relative pattern 2 ====
Relative pattern 2 is the relative clause version of affirmative pattern 4. There is a high tone on the initial syllable of the verb, which often links in a plateau with the tone after the tense-marker:

á-kú-thándiza 'who is helping'
á-má-thándiza 'who was helping'
á-ná-thándiza 'who helped (just now)' (Recent Past tense)

The same intonation is also found in certain temporal and conditional clause verbs:

ndí-kú-thándiza '(while) I am/was helping'
ndí-tá-thándiza 'after I helped'; 'if I were to help'

==== Relative pattern 3 ====
In this pattern, in longer verbs, a high tone is added to the initial syllable and the penultimate. However, there are slightly different versions of this pattern according the tense.

In the Present Potential tense, the first tone does not spread and the infix -nga- always has a low tone. The second tone remains on the penultimate, except in a monosyllabic verb:

á-nga-fotokóze 'who can explain'
á-nga-thandíze 'who can help'
á-nga-óne 'who can see'
á-nga-fé 'who can die'

The Remote Imperfect with -nká- has the same tones:

á-nka-fotokóza 'who was explaining'
á-nka-thandíza 'who was helping'
á-nka-óna 'who was seeing'
á-nka-fá 'who was dying'

However, in the Remote Perfect (Past Simple) tense, the intonation is slightly different. Here the first tone usually doubles, and in a two-syllable verb, the second tone is often 'bumped' to the final syllable:

á-ná-fotokóza 'who explained'
á-ná-thandíza 'who helped'
á-na-óna / á-ná-oná 'who saw' (yesterday or earlier)
á-na-fá 'who died'

In the Perfect tense, the first tone also often spreads, and in three or four-syllable verbs, the second tone is often bumped to the final syllable. When the verb is monosyllabic the second tone is lost:

w-á-fótokóza 'who has explained'
wá-thandíza / w-á-thándizá 'who has helped'
w-á-óná 'who has seen'
w-á-fa 'who has died'

Relative pattern 3 intonation is also used in some kinds of temporal and conditional clause verbs:

ndí-sa-na-malíze / ndí-sá-na-malíze 'before I finish'
ndí-kada-thandíza 'if I had helped'

==== Relative intonation of the subjunctive ====
In the relative subjunctive, a tone is added on the initial syllable, but the second tone remains on the final:

chíchitiké chichitiké 'what may happen, let it happen' (i.e., 'come what may')

In the future subjunctive, the tones similarly are on the initial and final syllables:

paméné ndí-dza-thandizé 'when I help (in future)'

This intonation is also found after ngati 'if':

ngati múkondé 'if you like it'

==== Relative patterns of ndili 'I am' ====
The irregular verb ndili 'I am', which is normally toneless, becomes ndíli in a relative or temporal clause:

imani pomwé múli 'stay where you are!'
ndílí mwaná 'when I was a boy'

The applied form, used in clauses of manner, is ndílílí:

momwé álílí 'the way he is'
momwé á-ná-lílí 'the way he was (this morning)'
momwé á-na-a-líli 'the way he was (yesterday)'

The Present Persistive tense of this verb, ndi-kada-lí 'I am still', has tones on the first and last syllable when used in a relative or temporal clause. It is often heard in the following phrase:

pá-ká-da-lí pano 'at the moment' (lit. 'it still being now')

==== Where the relative intonation is used ====
The relative clause intonation is frequently used in relative clauses, for example after améne or yemwé 'who'. The tone of améne spreads to make a plateau with the high tone of the relative clause verb:

Malálánjé améné múnágulá alí kuti?
'Where are the oranges which you bought?'
Ápézá galú améné ánámusowétsa
'He will find the dog which he lost'

With the relative pronoun omitted, the relative clause intonation alone shows that the verb is being used in a relative way:

mwezí wátha
'the month which has finished', i.e. last month
sabatá íkúbwéra-yi
'This week which is coming', i.e. next week.

Questions with ndaní? 'who?' and nchiyáni? 'what?' are expressed as cleft sentences, using relative clause intonation:

Wákhálá pa-mpando ndaní?
'Who is sitting on the chair?' (lit. 'the one who has sat down on the chair is who?')
Cháchítiká n'chiyáni?
'What's happened?' (lit. 'the thing that has happened is what?')

A common idiom is to use a form of the verb yamba 'begin' followed by the relative Perfect:

Yambani mwádyá nsíma, tikambirané
'Eat some nsima first, then let's talk'

==== Temporal clauses ====
The relative clause intonations are also used in temporal clauses after paméne 'when', which is derived from the relative pronoun:

Amavála paméné ndímálówa
'He was getting dressed when I entered'
Múdzákhala mútádyá paméné ndídzafiké kwánu.
'You will have eaten by the time I get to your house'

The word ndíli with dependent clause intonation is often used as a temporal clause. It can refer to past or present circumstances, according to the context. When followed by another word, the tone is doubled, making ndílí:

Ankádwálá kwámbíri álí mwaná
'He was very sick when he was a child'
Mvúlá ílí kugwá
'When rain is falling'

The participial tenses with -ku-, -ta-, -sana- and the persistive -kada- also all use the relative clause intonation. These refer to actions simultaneous with, earlier than, or subsequent to the main verb:

Ndidámúona ákúkwérá bási
'I saw him getting on a bus'
Átáóná ndalámayo, sádakhulupiríre
'When he saw the money, he didn't believe it'
Ndináfika anthu ásanagóne
'I arrived before people had gone to bed'
Ndidáyamba ndíkadalí ku sukúlu
'I began when I was still at school'

==== Clauses of manner ====
Clauses of manner are also expressed as a form of relative clause following momwé or mméne. These usually use the applied form of the verb ending in -ira or -era. The applied form of -li is -lili:

Momwé ánkachitíra
'As he used to do'
Mméné zinthu zílílí
'The way things are'

==== Conditional clauses ====
The dependent clause intonation is also used in conditional clauses, notably those with -kada- and -ta-:

Ndíkadadzíwa ndikadáphika thereré
'If I had known (that you would come back from the hunt empty-handed), I would have cooked some vegetables.'
Ndítápíta chíngachitíke n'chiyáni?
'If I were to go, what might happen?'

But the conditional tenses with -ka- and -chi- are toneless:

Pachipanda asíng'anga sí bwenzi mnyamatáyu álí ndí moyo
'Were it not for the traditional doctor(s), this boy would not be alive'

The relative intonation is similarly used after ngati 'if':

Sízíkudzíwíká ngati wámwálirá (wámwalíra)
'It isn't known if she has died'

However, when ngati means 'as if', the ordinary intonation is used.

==== Concessive clauses ====
This intonation can also make a concessive clause with the tense -nga-.

Ángapíte sakampéza
'Even if he goes, he won't find him there'
Ndíngasaúke chótáni, sindidandaúla
'However much I may suffer, I shan't complain'
Kángachépe
'Tip; small reward' (lit. 'though it be small')

The word ngakhále can also sometimes be followed by the relative intonation:

Ngakhálé mvúla íkubvúmba
'Even when rain is falling'

=== Infinitive ===
The Infinitive has a proclitic tone, that is, a high tone is heard on the syllable immediately following the prefix -ku-. This tone may spread in a verb of four syllables or longer:

ku-fótokoza / ku-fótókoza 'to explain'
ku-thándiza 'to help'
ku-óna 'to see'
ku-dyá 'to eat'

With a high-toned verb, the extra tone can be heard on the final only in verbs of three or more syllables. In a three-syllable verb, the tones form a plateau; in a two-syllable verb the second tone disappears by Meeussen's Rule. There are no high-toned monosyllabic verbs:

ku-khúlulukirá / ku-khúlúlukirá 'to forgive'
ku-dándaulá / ku-dándáulá 'to complain'
ku-námízá 'to deceive'
ku-góna 'to sleep'

When an object-marker or one of the aspect-markers -ká- or -dzá- are added, a tone is added on the penultimate in 5 or 4-syllable verbs, but on the final in verbs of three or two syllables. In monosyllabic verbs the second tone is deleted:

ku-mú-fotokozéra 'to explain to him'
ku-mú-thandizá 'to help him' (second tone on the final)
ku-mú-óná 'to see him'
ku-mú-pha 'to kill him'

ku-ká-fotokóza 'to go and explain'
ku-ká-thandizá 'to go and help' (second tone on the final)
ku-ká-óná 'to go and see'
ku-ká-dya 'to go and eat'

However, when the aspect-marker -má- is added, the tones change to pattern 5:

ku-má-fotokóza 'to be regularly explaining'
ku-má-thandíza 'to be regularly helping' (second tone on the penultimate)
ku-má-óná 'to be regularly seeing'
ku-má-dya 'to be regularly eating'

The negative Infinitive is formed with the infix -sa-. There is a single tone on the penultimate (or final in monosyllabic verbs):

ku-sa-fotokóza 'not to explain'
ku-sa-thandíza 'to fail to help'
ku-sa-óna 'not to see'
ku-sa-dyá 'not to eat'

The tone of an object-marker such as -mú- or of the aspect-markers -ká- and -dzá- is deleted, except in a monosyllabic verb, where it carries the tone:

ku-sa-mu-fotokozéra 'not to explain to him'
ku-sa-mu-thandíza 'to fail to help him'
ku-sa-mu-óna 'not to see him'
ku-sa-mú-pha 'not to kill him'

=== Imperative ===
The imperative is toneless, except in verbs that have their own lexical high tone on the final syllable. A monosyllabic verb requires a supporting vowel i-:

fotokoza! 'explain'
thandiza! 'help'
ona! 'see'
i-dya! 'eat'

The suffix -ni makes the imperative plural or polite:

i-dya-ni! 'eat'

The tone on the final syllable in intensive verbs can be heard:

yesetsá-ni! 'try!'

If an object-marker is added, its tone is transferred to the following syllable, except in a monosyllabic verb, and the final vowel changes to -é, as in the subjunctive. An object-marker and monosyllabic verb together have the same intonation as a two-syllable verb:

ndi-fótokozeré! / ndi-fótókozeré! 'explain to me!'
ndi-thándízé! 'help me!'
ndi-óne 'see me!' (the final tone disappears by Meeussen's Rule)
mú-phe 'kill him!'

The bare imperative in this form is said to be 'extremely rude'; it is more polite to add the prefix mu- to make a subjunctive: mu-ti-péze! 'please find us!'.

The imperative may be prefixed by various prefixes, which are generally reduced forms of auxiliary verbs (muka 'go', (i)dza 'come', chita 'do', (i)-nga 'be like', yamba 'begin') followed by a subjunctive, infinitive, or relative perfect. All the prefixes, when used in the imperative, are toneless.

When -ka- 'go and' or -dza- 'come and' are added, the subjunctive tone of the verb itself remains on the final -é:

ka-thandizé 'go and help'
ka-oné 'go and see'
dza-oné-ni 'come and see!'
ka-dyé-ni 'go and eat!'

Another prefix added to the imperative is ta-, used when begging someone to do something at once. This places a tone on the syllable which follows, as with pattern 4. The final vowel is -a:

ta-fúlumira-ni 'hurry up!'
ta-thándiza 'help!'
ta-bwéra 'do come!'
ta-dyá 'eat!'

When an object-marker is added as well, the tones are the same as in pattern 4. The final vowel is usually -a:

ta-ndí-fotokozéra 'explain to me!'
ta-ndí-thandizá 'help me!'
ta-ndí-úzá 'tell me!'
ta-ndí-dya 'eat me!'

The aspect-marker -ngo- 'just' may be added to an imperative as well, either with the supporting vowel i- or with the prefix tá-. The final vowel is always -a and the tones are pattern 4:

i-ngo-ndí-úzá 'just tell me!'
tá-ngo-ndí-úzá 'just tell me!'

The prefixes baa- and zi- (dzi-) add a tone on the penultimate (pattern 9):

baa-thandíza 'help meanwhile'
zi-thandíza 'keep helping!'

The negative of the imperative is derived from á 'of' with the negative infinitive. The tones are pattern 6 with a tone on ó-' (which does not spread) and a second tone on the penultimate:

ó-sa-fulumíra 'don't hurry!'

If an object-marker is added the negative subjunctive form is usually used, although the form with ó is also possible. In the subjunctive, the only tone is on the penultimate syllable:

mu-sa-ndi-fúnse 'don't ask me!'
(ó-sa-ndi-fúnsa 'don't ask me!')
mu-sa-ka-i-mánge 'don't go and tie them (the mats) up!'

=== Tones of -li ('am', 'are', 'is') ===
As well as the word ndi 'is/are' used for identity (e.g. 'he is a teacher') Chichewa has another verb -li 'am, are, is' used for position or temporary state (e.g. 'he is well', 'he is in Lilongwe'). The tones of this are irregular in that in the Present Simple, there is no tone on the subject-marker. For the Remote Past, both á-naa-lí and a-ná-li can be heard, apparently without difference of meaning. In the dependent Applied Present (-lili), used in clauses of manner, the two tones make a plateau.

In main clauses the tones are as follows:

ndi-li 'I am'
ndi-na-lí 'I was (recent)'
ndí-náa-lí / ndídáalí 'I was' (remote)
ndi-ná-li, ndi-dá-li 'I was' (same as above)
ndi-kada-lí (or ndi-ka-lí) 'I am still'

Negative tenses:

sí-ndi-li 'I am not'
sí-ndí-na-lí 'I was not' (recent)
sí-ndí-na-a-lí 'I was not' (remote)

In relative clauses:

améné áli 'who is'
améné á-ná-lí 'who was' (recent)
améné á-naa-lí 'who was' (remote)
momwé ndí-lílí 'the way that I am'
momwé ndí-ná-lílí 'the way that I was' (recent)
momwé ndí-naa-líli 'the way that I was' (remote)

In temporal clauses:

ndí-lí 'when I am/was'
ndí-kada-lí (or á-ka-lí) 'when I am/was still'

The dependent-clause form of the Persistive tense is frequently heard in the phrase pá-kada-lí pano 'at the present time' (literally, 'it still being now').

=== Aspect-markers ===
Between the tense-marker and the object-marker it is possible to add one or more aspect-markers. If more than one is added, they usually come in the order -má-, -ká-, -dzá-, -ngo-. Another, much less common, marker is -ba- or -baa-. These infixes were originally independent verbs that have become incorporated into the tenses system: muka 'go', -dza 'come', -nga 'be like', yamba 'begin'. They retain traces of the tones they originally had as independent verbs; for example, in the imperative, they are toneless. The verb stem itself, when used with an aspect-marker, often has a tone on the penultimate syllable; but with -ngo-, the tone follows the infix.

==== Tones of -má- ====
The aspect-marker -má-, marking continuity or regularity, is usually pronounced with tone pattern 5, that is, with a tone on itself and on the penultimate. The tone on -má- does not spread:

ndi-ka-má-thandíza 'whenever I help'
ku-má-thandíza 'to be helping regularly'
ku-sa-má-thandíza 'not to be helping'

If -ngo- 'just' is added, the second tone follows -ngo-, as in affirmative pattern 8:

ndi-ku-má-ngo-thándiza 'I am always just helping'

-má- loses its tone in the Present Habitual tense, but the tone returns in the negative. The penultimate tone is lost in the negative, but it reappears if there is an object-marker:

ndí-ma-thandíza 'I usually help'
sí-ndí-má-thandiza 'I never help'
sí-ndí-má-mu-thandíza 'I never help him'

==== Tones of -ká- ====
The aspect-marker -ká- 'go and' normally has a tone, which may spread in longer verbs. There is no tone on the penultimate:

ndí-ká-thandiza (ndí-ká-thándiza) 'I will help (there)'
ndi-ná-ká-thandiza (ndi-ná-ká-thándiza) 'I went and helped'

When added to pattern 4, -ká- causes the same changes as an object-marker, that is an extra tone is added to the penultimate; but in two or three-syllable verbs it is heard on the final. The tone of -ká- can spread:

ndi-ku-ká-fótokóza 'I will explain (when I get there)'
ndi-ku-ká-thándizá 'I will help'
ndi-ku-ká-óná 'I will see'
ndi-ku-ká-dya 'I will eat'

Combined with the subjunctive, -ká- keeps its tone and makes pattern 5. There is no spreading:

ndi-ká-thandíze 'I should go and help'

But with the imperative, -ká- is toneless:

ka-thandizé 'go and help!'

It is also toneless if added to negative pattern 2, except with a monosyllabic verb:

si-ndi-ka-thandíza 'I am not going to help'
si-ndi-ká-dya 'I am not going to eat'

Similarly it has a low tone when added to other patterns which have penultimate tone, such as patterns 5 and 6 or negative pattern 3. In these patterns the first tone does not spread:

ndi-zí-ka-thandíza 'I should be going to help'
si-ndi-ngá-ka-thandíze 'I can't go and help'

==== Tones of -dzá- ====
The aspect-marker -dzá-, which either means 'come and' or refers to the future, has exactly the same tones as for -ká- described above.

==== Tones of -ngo- ====
When added to a toneless tense, -ngo- 'just' has a tone after it, as in tone pattern 4:

i-ngo-thándiza 'just help!'
nd-a-ngo-thándiza 'I have just helped'
ndi-ka-ngo-thándiza 'if I just help'

With other tenses it has the tones of pattern 8, that is, it has a tone before it and after it, while -ngo- itself is low:

ndi-má-ngo-thándiza 'I was just helping' (Imperfect)
ndí-dzá-ngo-thándiza 'I will just help' (Remote Future)

==== Tones of -ba-/-baa- ====
The aspect-marker -ba-, usually pronounced -baa- 'meanwhile', is referred to by Mchombo and by Downing and Mtenje as the 'continuative'. When used with as an imperative, the infix is toneless, but there is a tone on the penultimate:

baa-thandíza 'help meanwhile'

As a subjunctive, it has tones on both -baa- and the penultimate, i.e. pattern 5. In a monosyllabic verb the second tone is on the final. The final vowel is always a:

ndi-báa-thandíza 'let me help meanwhile'
ti-báa-mwá 'let's have a drink meanwhile'

== Intonational tones ==
In addition to the ordinary lexical tones which go with individual words, and the grammatical tones of verb tenses, other tones can be heard which show phrasing or indicate a question.

=== Boundary tones ===
Voicetrack of the sentence Mwamúna, ámulamúlá amáyi ('A man, he rules women') (Myers (1996), p. 34), illustrating a boundary tone after mwamúna, and also the typical downdrift of tones through the sentence.

Quite often, if there is a pause in the middle of sentence, such as might be indicated by a comma in writing, the speaker's voice will rise on the syllable just before the pause. This rising tone is called a boundary tone. A boundary tone is typically used after the topic of a sentence, at the end of a dependent clause, after items on a list, and so on. The illustration included here of the sentence Mwamúna, ámulamúlá amáyi ('A man, he rules women') clearly shows the rise in the voice on the last syllable of the word mwamúna, which is here taken to be the topic of the sentence.

A typical sentence where the dependent clause precedes the main clause is the following:

mu-ka-chí-kónda↗, mu-chi-gúle 'if you like it, please buy it'

As Kanerva points out, the rising boundary tone is not used when the order is reversed and the dependent clause follows the main clause.

Another kind of tone considered to be a boundary tone, but this time a low one, is the optional fall in the speaker's voice at the end of sentences which causes the final high tone on words like chákúdyá 'food' to drop to become chákúdya. The end-of-sentence boundary tone is marked L% in Myers' illustration.

Both Kanerva and Stevick also mention a 'level' boundary tone, which occurs mid-sentence, but without any rise in pitch.

=== Tones of questions ===
==== Wh-Questions ====
Questions in Chichewa often add high tones where an ordinary statement has no tone. For example, with the word kuti? 'where?', liti 'when?', yani 'who?' or chiyáni 'what?' some people add a tone on the last syllable of the preceding word. This tone does not spread backwards, although it may form a plateau with an antepenultimate tone, as in the 3rd and 4th examples below:

alí kuti? 'where is he?'
ndiwé yani? 'who are you?'
mu-ná-fíká liti? 'when did you arrive?'
mu-ká-chítá chiyáni? 'what are you going to do there?'

But as Stevick points out, not all speakers do this, and others may say mu-ná-fika liti?

When kuti? 'which place?' or liti? 'which day?' are preceded by ndi 'is', they take a high tone on the first syllable:

kwánú ndi kúti? 'where is your home?'

It appears that with some speakers the high tone after ndi is heard on the final syllable in forms of this adjective which begin with a vowel; but with other speakers it is heard on the first syllable:

mipando yáikúlu ndi ití? 'which are the large chairs?'
msewu wópíta ku Blántyre ndi úti? 'which is the road going to Blantyre?'

A high tone also goes on the final syllable in ndaní? '(it is) who?' (which is derived from ndi yani?) Before this word and nchiyáni? '(is) what?', since such questions are phrased as a cleft sentence or relative clause, the verb has its relative-clause intonation:

wákhálá pampando ndaní? '(the one who is) sitting on the chair is who?', i.e. 'who is it who's sitting on the chair?'

The relative-clause intonation of the verb is also used when a question begins with bwánji? 'how come?', but not when it ends with bwánji?, when it has the meaning 'how?'

==== Yes–no questions ====
With yes–no questions, intonations vary. The simplest tone is a rising boundary tone on the final syllable:

mwa-landirá? 'did you receive it?'

A more insistent question often has a HL falling boundary tone on the last syllable. Pitch transcriptions show that the voice rises up on the penultimate and falls on the final:

mwa-landirâ? 'did you receive it?'

But in other dialects, it seems that this fall may begin on the penultimate syllable:

ku Zómba? 'in Zombá?'

If there is already a penultimate high tone it may simply be raised higher:

ku Baláka? 'in Baláka?'

Alternatively, there can be two successive falling tones, one on the penultimate, and another on the final.

Sometimes, however, there is no particular intonational tone and the question has the same intonation as a statement, especially if the question starts with the question-asking word kodí.

When there is a choice between two things in a disjunctive question, the first half of the question ends in a high boundary tone, but the voice drops in the second half:

mukufúná khófí (H%), kapéná thíyi (L%)? 'do you want coffee or (would you prefer) tea?'

=== Other idiomatic tones ===
Some speakers add intonational tones also with the toneless word kale 'already', making not only the final syllable of kale itself high but also the last syllable of the verb which precedes it:

ndabviná kálé 'I have danced already'
ndináfíká kalé 'I arrived a short time ago'

Other speakers do not add these intonational tones, but pronounce ndavina kale with Low tones.

Occasionally a verb which is otherwise low-toned will acquire a high tone in certain idiomatic usages, e.g. ndapitá 'I'm off' (said on parting), from the normally toneless pita 'go'. This can perhaps also be considered a kind of intonational tone.

=== Focus and emphasis ===
In European languages it is common for a word which is picked out for contrast to be pronounced on a higher pitch than the other words in a sentence, e.g. in the sentence they fed the baboon fish, not the elephant, it is likely that the speaker will draw attention to the word baboon by pronouncing it on a high pitch, while the word fish, which has been mentioned already, will be on a low pitch. This kind of emphasis is known as 'focus'. In tonal languages it appears that this raising or lowering of the pitch to indicate focus is either absent or much less noticeable.

A number of studies have examined how focus is expressed in Chichewa and whether it causes a rise in pitch. One finding was that for most speakers, focus has no effect on pitch. For some speakers, however, it appears that there is a slight rise in pitch if a word with a tone is focussed. A toneless word, when in focus, does not appear to rise in pitch.

A different kind of emphasis is emphasis of degree. To show that something is very small, or very large, or very distant, a Chichewa-speaker will often raise the pitch of his or her voice considerably, breaking the sequence of downdrift. For example, a word such as kwámbíri 'very much' or pang'óno 'a little' is sometimes pronounced with a high pitch. The toneless demonstrative uyo 'that man' can also acquire a tone and become úyo! with a high pitch to mean 'that man over there in the distance'.

== Tonal minimal pairs ==
Sometimes two nouns are distinguished by their tone patterns alone, e.g.

mténgo 'tree' vs mtengo 'price'
khúngu 'blindness' vs khungú 'skin'

Verbs can also sometimes be distinguished by tone alone:

ku-lémera 'to be rich' vs ku-lémérá 'to be heavy'
ku-pwéteka 'to hurt' vs ku-pwétéká 'to be hurt'

There is also a distinction between:

ndi 'it is' vs ndí 'and, with'

However, minimal pairs of this kind which differ in lexical tone are not particularly common.

More significant are minimal pairs in verbs, where a change of tones indicates a change in the tense, or a difference between the same tense used in a main clause and in a subordinate clause, for example:

ndí-ma-werénga 'I usually read' vs ndi-ma-wérenga 'I was reading'
sá-na-bwére 'he did not come' vs sa-na-bwére 'he has not come yet'
ndi-kaná-pita 'I would have gone' vs ndí-kana-píta 'if I had gone'
chaká chatha 'the year has finished' vs chaká chátha 'last year'

== Reduplicated words ==
Reduplicated words are those in which an element is repeated, such as chipolopolo 'bullet'. The tones of these have been extensively studied in the literature.

=== Reduplication in nouns ===
In nouns, the two elements join as follows (note that hyphens have been added here for clarity, but are not used in the standard orthography of Chichewa).

LL + LL becomes LLLL (i.e. there is no additional tone):

chi-ng'ani-ng'ani 'lightning'
chi-were-were 'sex outside marriage'

LH + LH becomes LHLL (i.e. the second tone is dropped):

chi-masó-maso 'adultery'
m-lengá-lenga 'sky, atmosphere'
chi-bolí-boli 'wooden carving'

HL + HL becomes HLLH (or HHLH), by 'bumping':

chi-láko-lakó (or chi-lákó-lakó) 'desire'
chi-thúnzi-thunzí (or chi-thúnzí-thunzí) 'picture'
a-múna-muná (or a-múná-muná) 'real men'

=== Reduplication in adverbs ===
When adverbs are reduplicated, however, and there is an element of emphasis, the first two types have an additional tone. Thus:

LL + LL becomes LLHL (i.e. there is an additional high tone on the second element):

bwino-bwíno 'very carefully'
kale-kále 'long ago' (or 'far off in the future')

LH + LH is also different when emphatic, becoming LHHH (or in the Southern Region HHHH):

kwení-kwéní (or kwéní-kwéní) 'really'
okhá-ókhá (or ókhá-ókhá) 'only, exclusively'

When a three-syllable element is repeated, there is no special change:

pang’óno-pang’óno 'gradually'
kawíri-kawíri 'often'

=== Reduplication in verbs ===
A high tone following a proclitic tense-marker does not repeat when the verb is reduplicated:

ku-thándiza-thandiza 'to help here and there'

However, a final or penultimate tone will usually repeat (unless the verb has only two syllables, in which case the middle tone may be suppressed):

ti-thandizé-thandizé 'let's help here and there'
ndí-ma-thandíza-thandíza 'I usually help here and there'
á-ma-yenda-yénda 'they move about here and there'

=== Reduplication in ideophones ===
Ideophones (expressive words) have slightly different types of reduplication. Moto (1999) mentions the following types:

All high:

góbédé-góbédé (noise of dishes clattering)
bálálá-bálálá (scattering of people or animals in all directions)

All low:

dzandi-dzandi (walking unsteadily)

High on the first syllable only:

chéte-chete (in dead silence)

== Bibliography ==
- Botne, Robert D. & Andrew Kulemeka (1991). A learner's Chichewa-English, English-Chichewa dictionary. Köln: Rüdiger Köppe Verlag.
- Clark, Mary (1988). "An Accentual Analysis of the Zulu Noun", in Harry van der Hulst & Norval Smith, Autosegmental Studies in Pitch Accent. Dordrecht: Foris.
- Cibelli, Emily (2012). "The Phonetic Basis of a Phonological Pattern: Depressor Effects of Prenasalized Consonants". UC Berkeley Phonology Lab Annual Report, 55–71. (Now published in Joaquín Romero, María Riera (2015) The Phonetics–Phonology Interface: Representations and methodologies, 335, 171–192.)
- Cruttenden, Alan (1986). Intonation. Cambridge University Press.
- Downing, Laura J. (2008). "Focus and Prominence in Chichewa, Chitumbuka, and Durban Zulu", ZAS Papers in Linguistics 49, 47–65.
- Downing, Laura J., Al D. Mtenje, & Bernd Pompino-Marschall (2004). "Prosody and Information Structure in Chichewa", ZAS Working Papers in Linguistics 37, 167–186.
- Downing, Laura J. & Al D. Mtenje (2010). "The prosody of relative clauses in Chichewa". Workshop on Relative Clauses in Bantu Languages LAM, Paris, 8–9 January 2010.
- Downing, Laura J. & Al D. Mtenje (2011). "Un-WRAP-ping prosodic phrasing in Chichewa", in Nicole Dehé, Ingo Feldhausen & Shinichiro Ishihara (eds.). The Phonology-Syntax Interface, Lingua 121, 1965–1986.
- Downing, Laura J. & Bernd Pompino-Marschall (2013). "The focus prosody of Chichewa and the Stress-Focus constraint: a response to Samek-Lodovici (2005)". Natural Language and Linguistic Theory, Volume 31, Issue 3, pp 647–681.
- Downing, Laura J. (2017). "Tone and intonation in Chichewa and Tumbuka". In Laura J. Downing & Annie Rialland (eds) Intonation in African Tone Languages. de Gruyter, Berlin/Boston, pp. 365–392.
- Downing, Laura J.; Mtenje, Al (2017). The Phonology of Chichewa. Oxford University Press.
- Hyman, Larry M. & Al D. Mtenje (1999a). "Prosodic Morphology and tone: the case of Chichewa" in René Kager, Harry van der Hulst and Wim Zonneveld (eds.) The Prosody-Morphology Interface. Cambridge University Press, 90–133.
- Hyman, Larry M. & Al D. Mtenje (1999b). "Non-Etymological High Tones in the Chichewa Verb", Malilime: The Malawian Journal of Linguistics no.1.
- Hyman, Larry M. (2000). "Privative Tone in Bantu". Paper presented at the Symposium on Tone ILCAA, Tokyo, December 12–16, 2000.
- Hyman, Larry M. (2007). "Tone: Is it Different?". Draft prepared for The Handbook of Phonological Theory, 2nd Ed., Blackwell (John Goldsmith, Jason Riggle & Alan Yu, eds)
- Hyman, Larry M. (2009). "How (not) to do phonological typology: the case of pitch-accent". Language Sciences 31, 213–238.
- Kamwendo, Gregory H. (1999). "Work in Progress: The Monolingual Dictionary Project in Malawi", Malilime: The Malawian Journal of Linguistics no.1.
- Kanerva, Jonni M. (1990). Focus and Phrasing in Chichewa Phonology. New York, Garland.
- Kimenyi, Alexandre (2009). "The Multiple Syntagmatic Positions and Various Meanings and Functions of the Morpheme nga in Bantu." California State University.
- Kishindo, Pascal, 2001. "Authority in Language: The Role of the Chichewa Board (1972–1995) in Prescription and Standardization of Chichewa". Journal of Asian and African Studies, No. 62.
- Kulemeka, Andrew T. (2002). Tsinde: Maziko a Galamala ya Chichewa, Mother Tongue editions, West Newbury, Massachusetts.
- Louw, Johan K. (1987). Pang'onopang'ono ndi Mtolo: Chichewa: A Practical Course. UNISA Press. Part 3: Wordlist (tones marked)
- Maxson, Nate (2011). Chicheŵa for English Speakers: A New and Simplified Approach. Assemblies of God Literature Press, Malawi.
- Mchombo, Sam (2004). Syntax of Chichewa. Cambridge University Press.
- Mchombo, Sam; Moto, Francis (1981). "Tone and the Theory of Syntax". In W.R. Leben (ed.) Précis from the 12th Conference on African Linguistics, Stanford University, pp. 92–95.
- Moto, Francis (1983). "Aspects of Tone Assignment in Chichewa", Journal of Contemporary African Studies, 3:1.
- Moto, Francis (1999). "The tonal phonology of Bantu ideophones", in Malilime: The Malawian Journal of Linguistics no.1, 100–120.
- Mtanthauziramawu wa Chinyanja/Chichewa: The first Chinyanja/Chichewa monolingual dictionary (c2000). Blantyre (Malawi): Dzuka Pub. Co. (Also published online at the website of the Centre for Language Studies of the University of Malawi.)
- Mtenje, Al D. (1986). Issues in the Non-Linear Phonology of Chichewa part 1. Issues in the Non-Linear Phonology of Chichewa part 2. PhD Thesis, University College, London.
- Mtenje, Al D. (1987). "Tone Shift Principles in the Chichewa Verb: A Case for a Tone Lexicon", Lingua 72, 169–207.
- Mtenje, Al D. (1988). "On Tone and Transfer in Chichewa Reduplication". Linguistics 26, 125–55.
- Mtenje, Al D. (1995). "Tone Shift, Accent and the Domains in Bantu: the Case of Chichewa", in Katamba, Francis. Bantu Phonology and Morphology: LINCOM Studies in African Linguistics 06.
- Mtenje, Al D. (2001). Comparative Bantu On-Line Dictionary (CBOLD) Chichewa Dictionary. This is an abridged version of Clement Scott and Alexander Hetherwick's 1929 Dictionary of the Nyanja Language, with tones added by Al Mtenje.
- Myers, Scott (1988). "Surface Underspecification of Tone in Chichewa", Phonology, Vol. 15, No. 3, 367–91.
- Myers, Scott (1996). "Boundary tones and the phonetic implementation of tone in Chichewa", Studies in African Linguistics 25, 29–60.
- Myers, Scott (1999a). "Downdrift and pitch range in Chichewa intonation", Proceedings of the 14th International Congress of Phonetic Sciences, vol. 3, pp. 1981–4.
- Myers, Scott (1999b). "Tone association and f0 timing in Chichewa", Studies in African Linguistics 28, 215–239.
- Myers, Scott (2004). "The Effects of Boundary Tones on the f0 Scaling of Lexical Tones". In Proceedings of the 4th International Symposium on Tonal Aspects of Languages 2014, pp. 147–150.
- Myers, Scott & Troi Carleton (1996). "Tonal Transfer in Chichewa". Phonology, vol 13, (1) 39–72.
- Nurse, Derek & Gérard Philippson (2006). "Common tense-aspect markers in Bantu". Journal of African Languages and Linguistics. 27 (2): 155–196.
- Salaun, Rev. Fr. Noel (1993) [1969]. Chicheŵa Intensive Course, 3rd edition. Likuni Press and Publishing House, Malawi.
- Scotton, Carol Myers & Gregory John Orr, (1980). Learning Chichewa, Bk 1. Learning Chichewa, Bk 2. Peace Corps Language Handbook Series. Peace Corps, Washington, D.C.
- Stevick, Earl et al. (1965). Chinyanja Basic Course. Foreign Service Institute, Washington, D.C.
- Trithart, Lee (1976). "Desyllabified noun class prefixes and depressor consonants in Chichewa", in L.M. Hyman (ed.) Studies in Bantu Tonology, Southern California Occasional Papers in Linguistics 3, Los Angeles, CA: University of Southern California, 259–86.
- Watkins, Mark Hanna (1937). A Grammar of Chichewa: A Bantu Language of British Central Africa, Language, Vol. 13, No. 2, Language Dissertation No. 24 (Apr.-Jun., 1937), pp. 5–158.
- Yip, Moira (2002). Tone. Cambridge University Press.

== See also ==
- Luganda tones
