= Mundum language =

Grassfields Bantu language of Cameroon

Mundum
- Ngemba
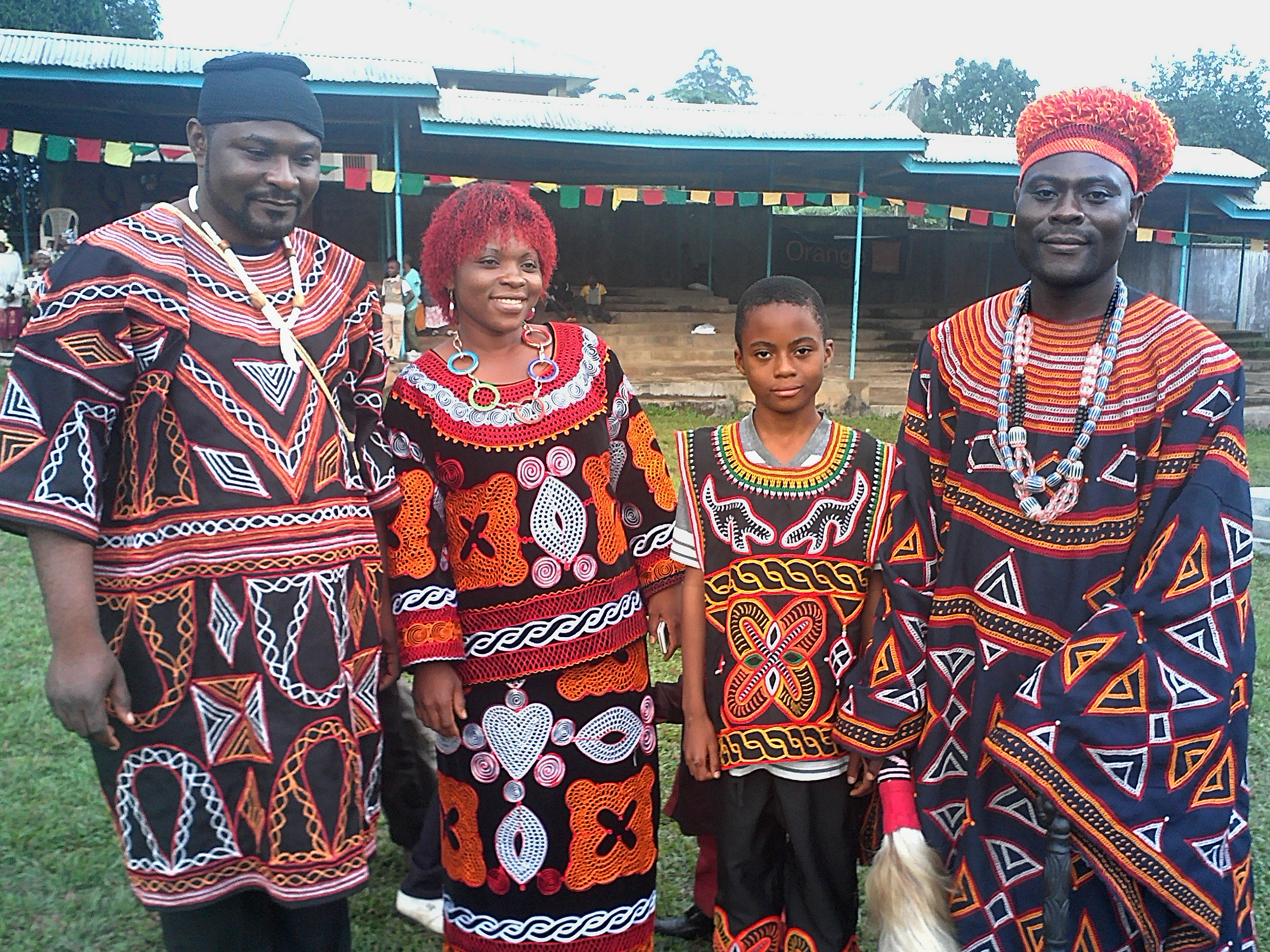
- Traditional Ngemba clothes
- Native to: Cameroon
- Language family: Niger–Congo?: Atlantic–Congo; Volta-Congo; Benue–Congo; Bantoid; Southern Bantoid; Grassfields; Eastern Grassfields; Mbam-Nkam; Ngemba; Mundum

Language codes
- ISO 639-3: –
- Glottolog: mund1341 Mundum

Mundum (Bamundum) is a Grassfields Bantu language spoken in Cameroon. It is closely related to Mankon and Mendankwe-Nkwen; along with Mankon, it is called Ngemba. There are two dialects, Anyang and Mberewi.

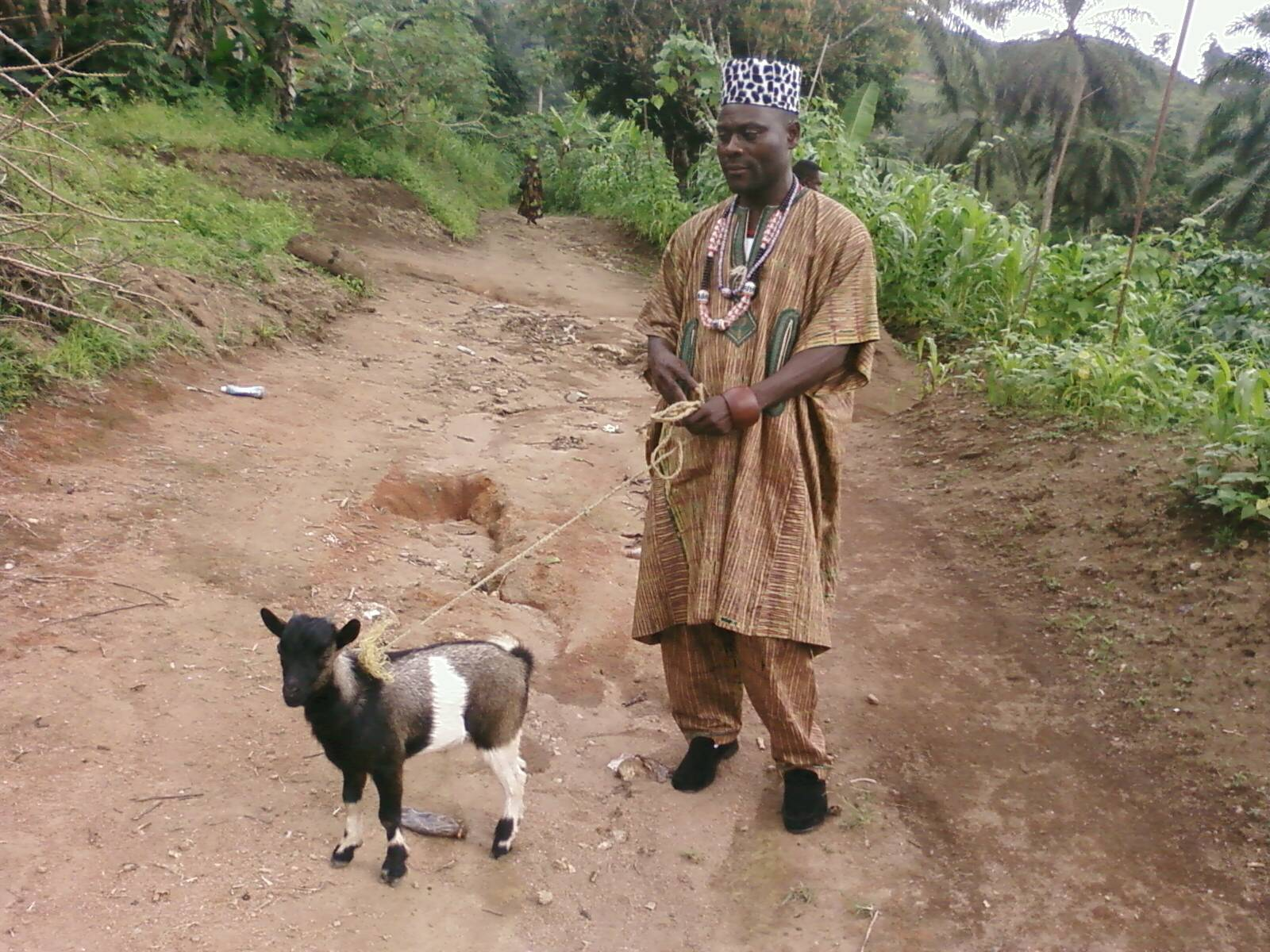
Traditional clothing called Togho

== Culture ==
Festivities among the ngemba

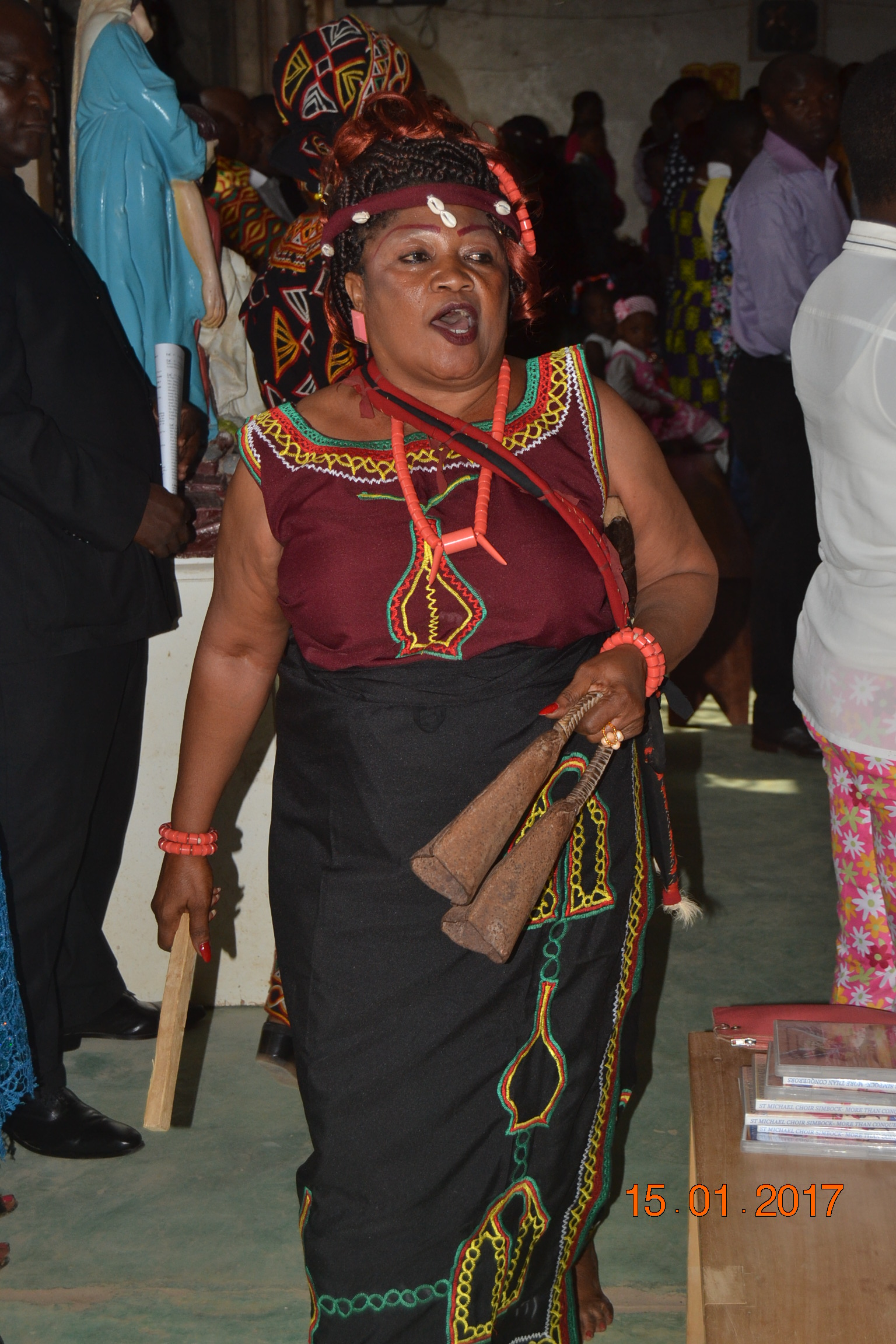

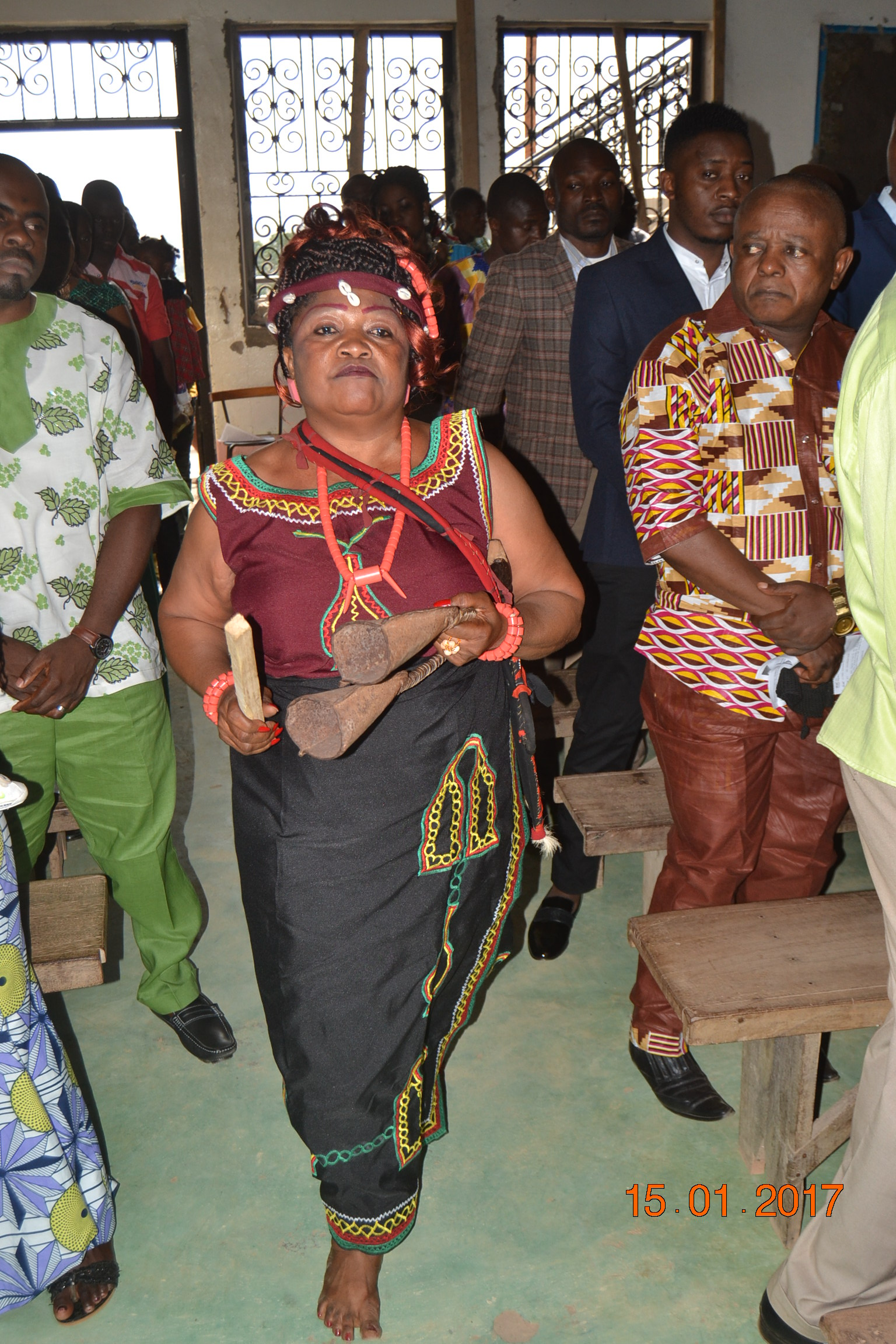

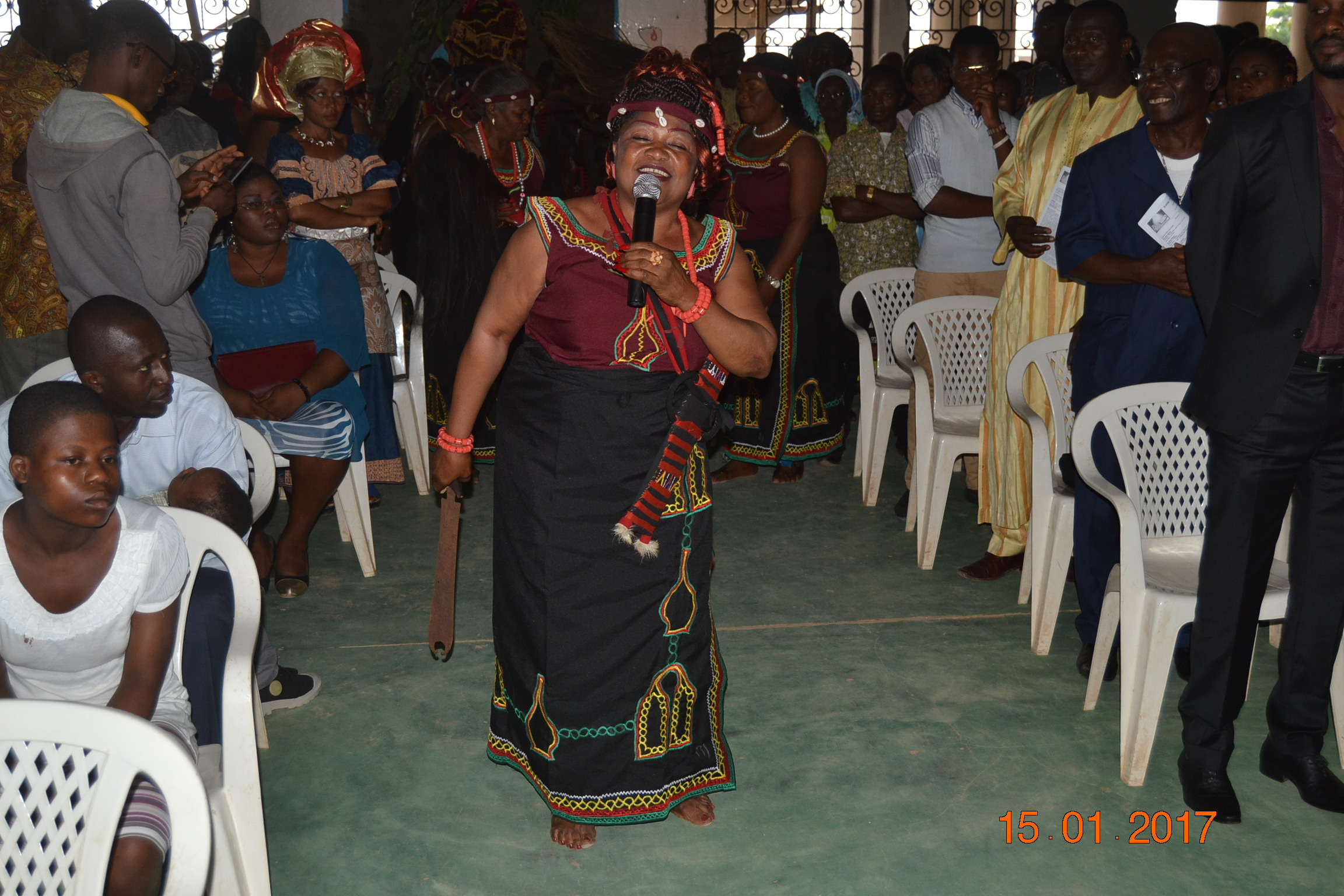

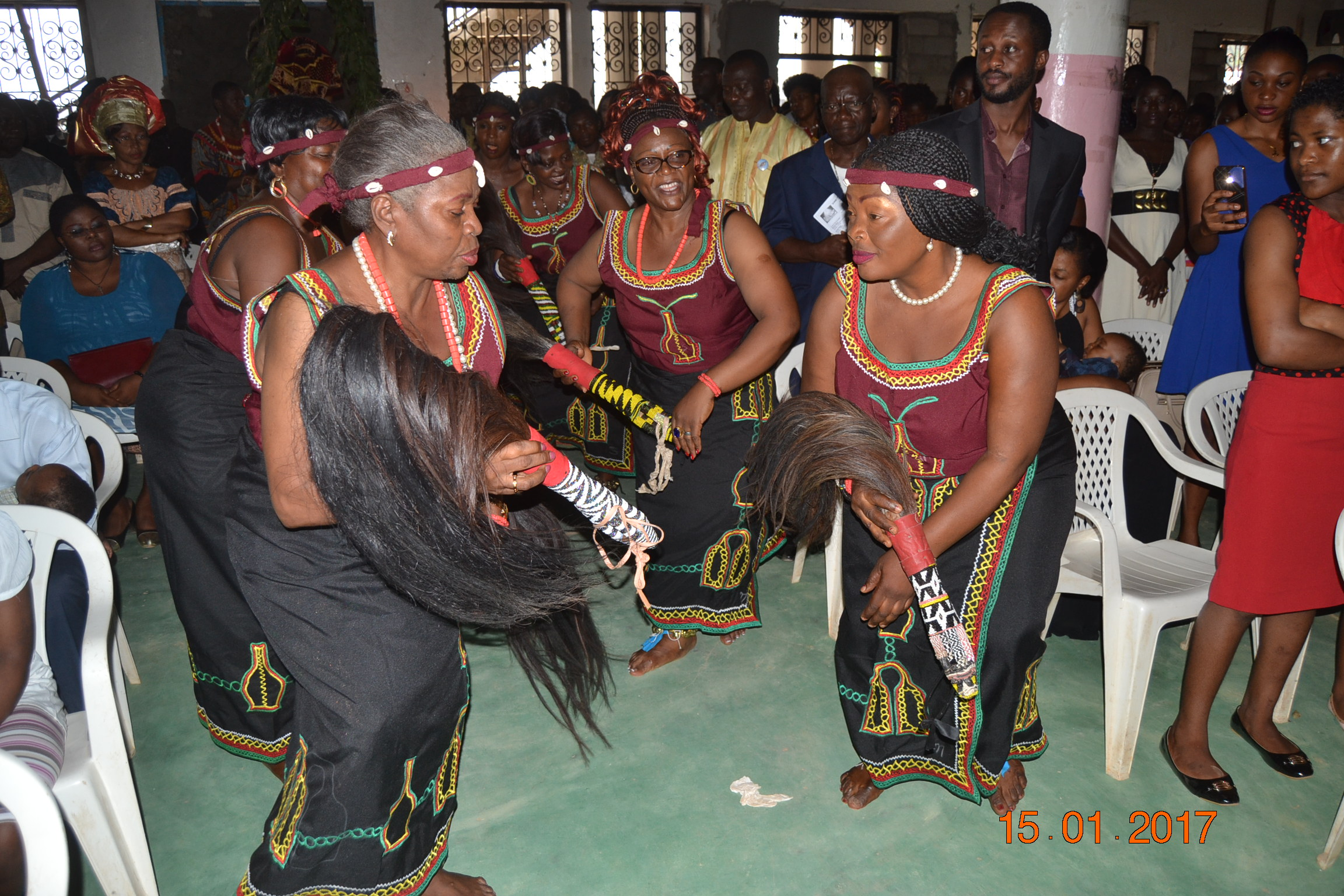

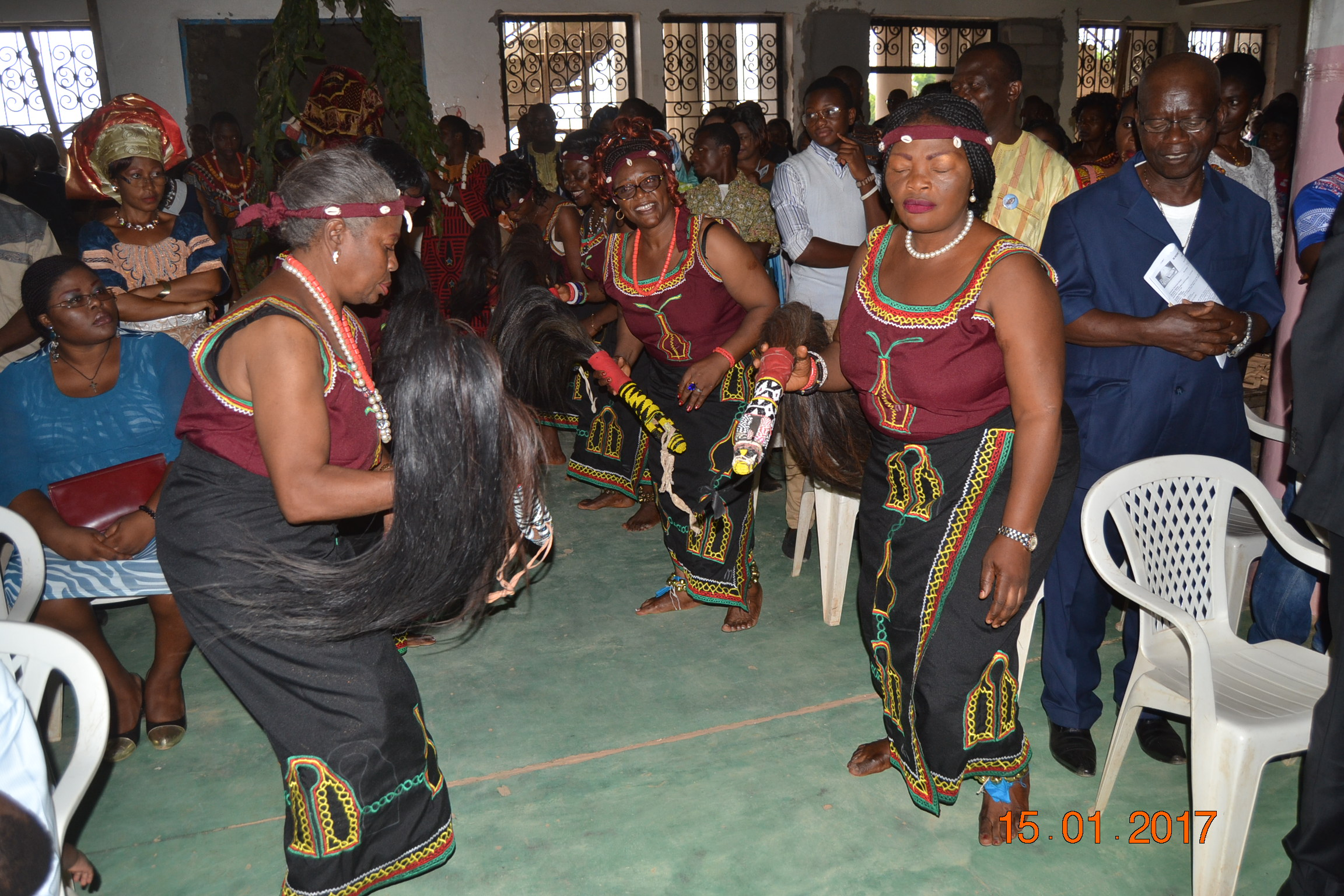

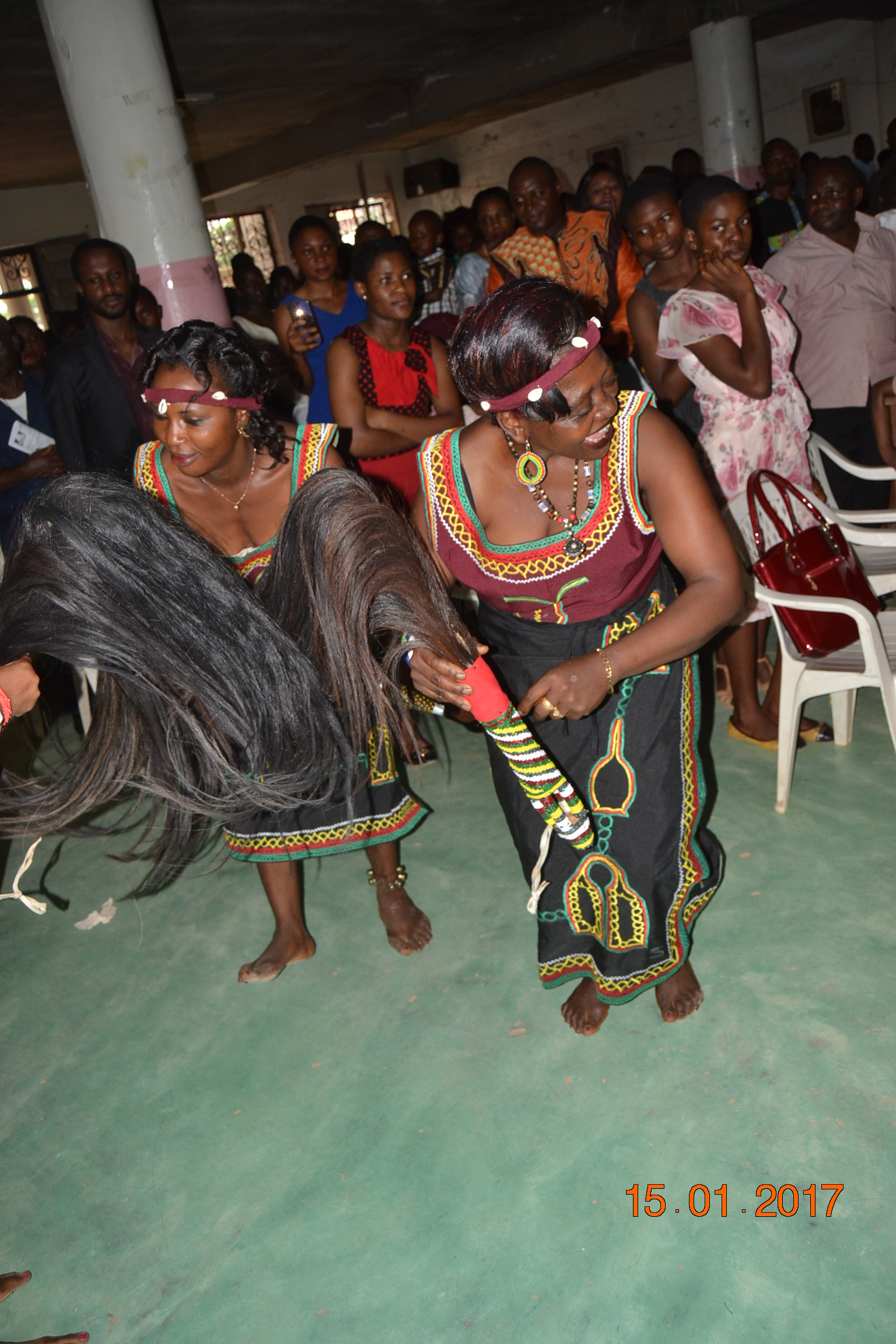

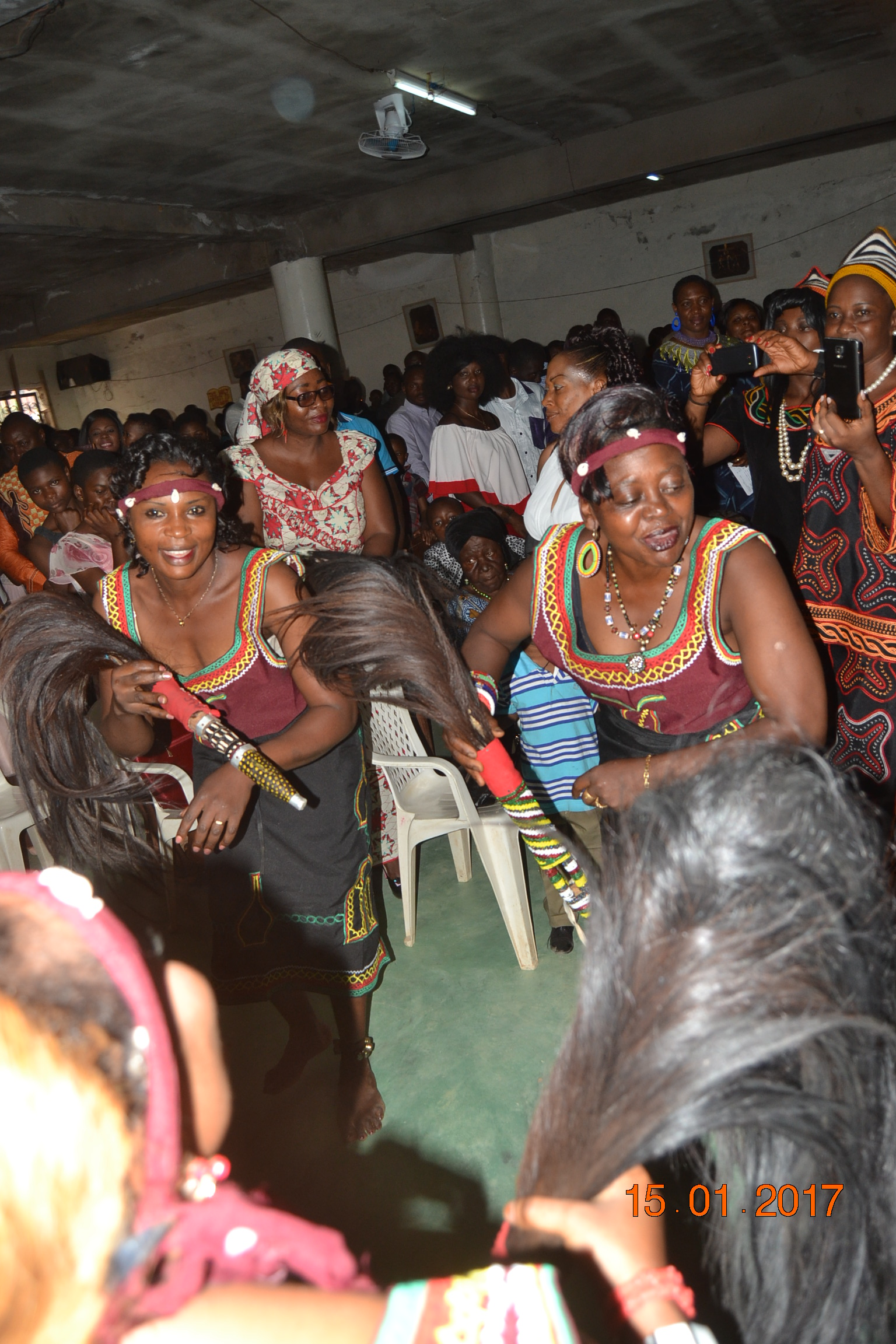

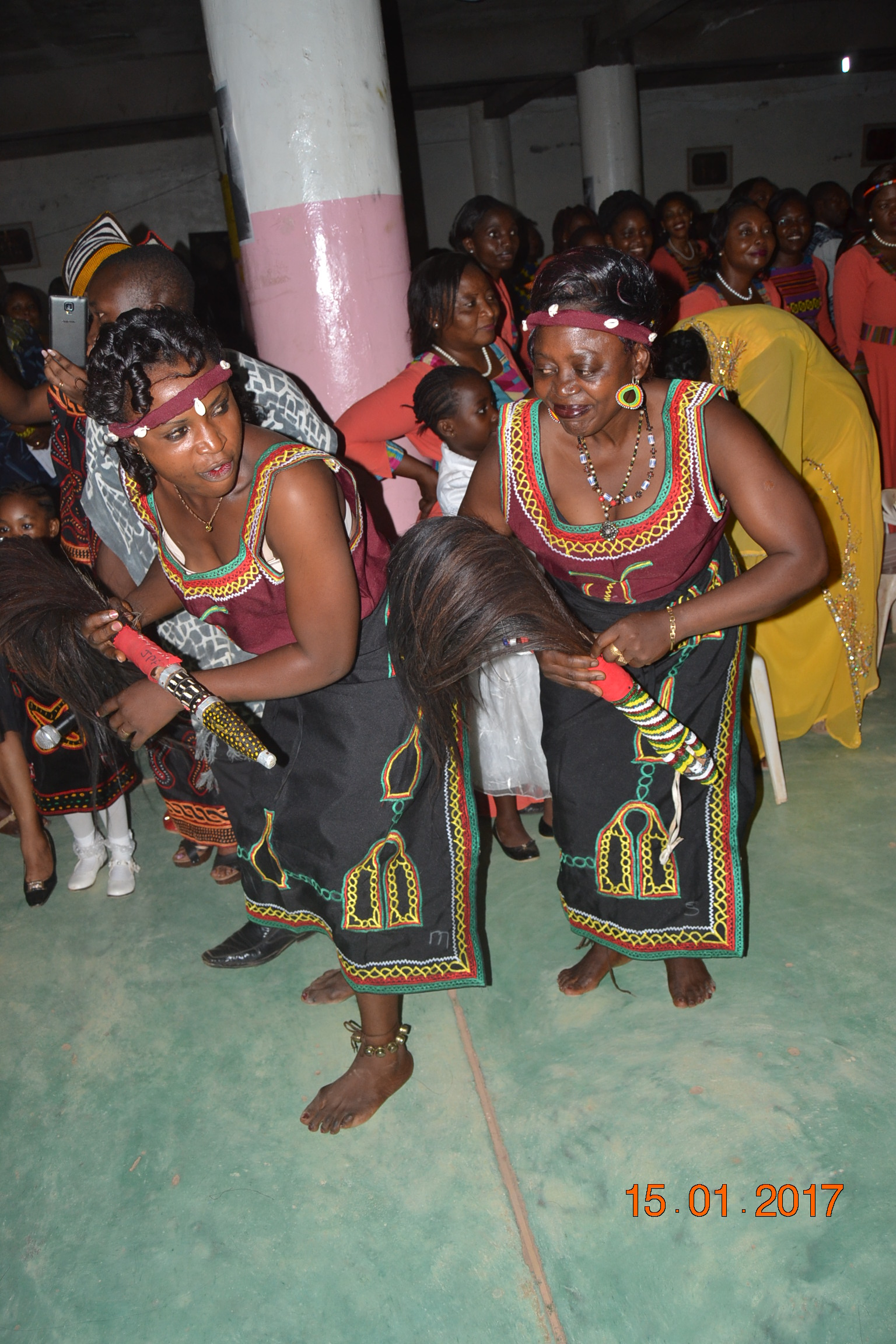

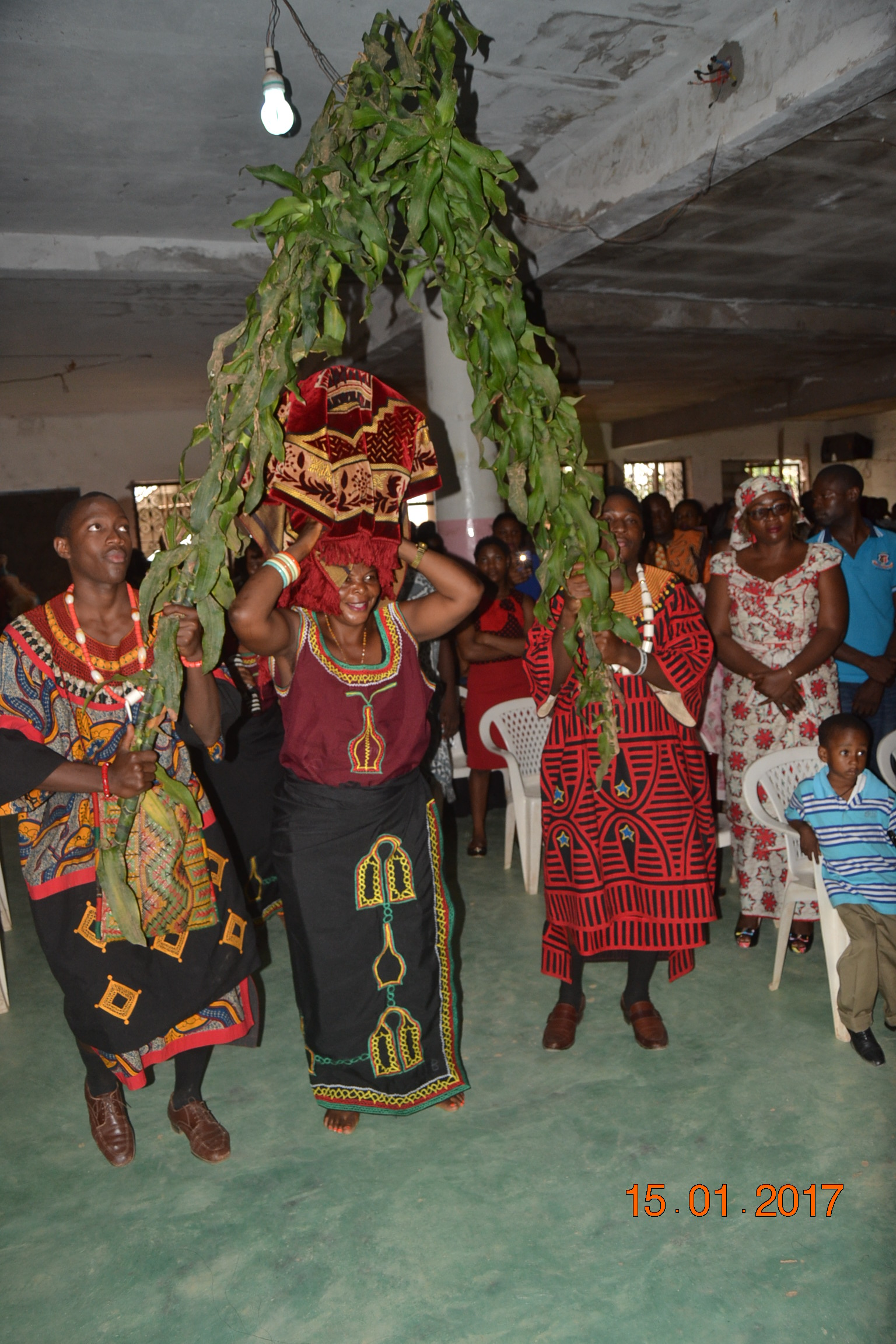

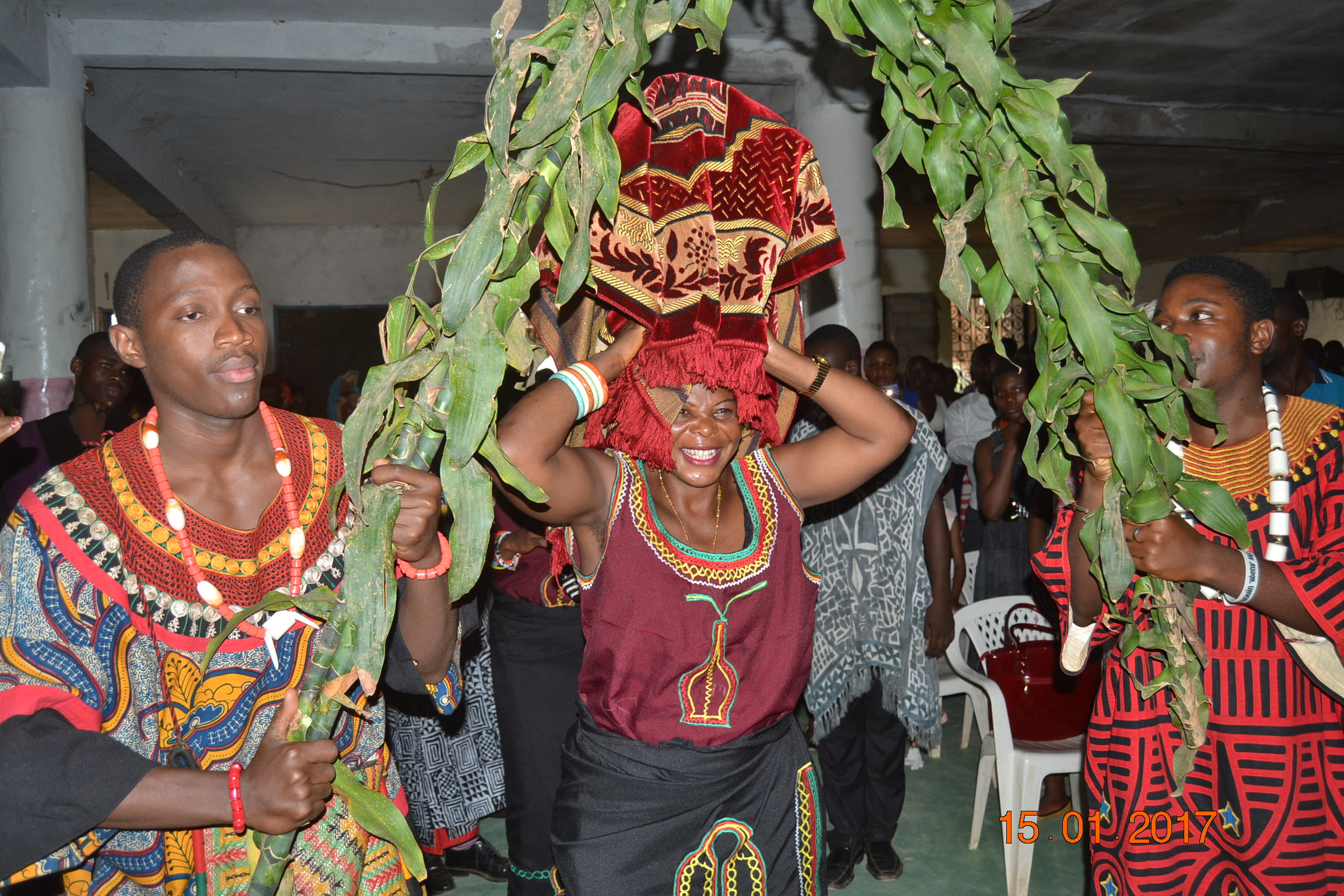

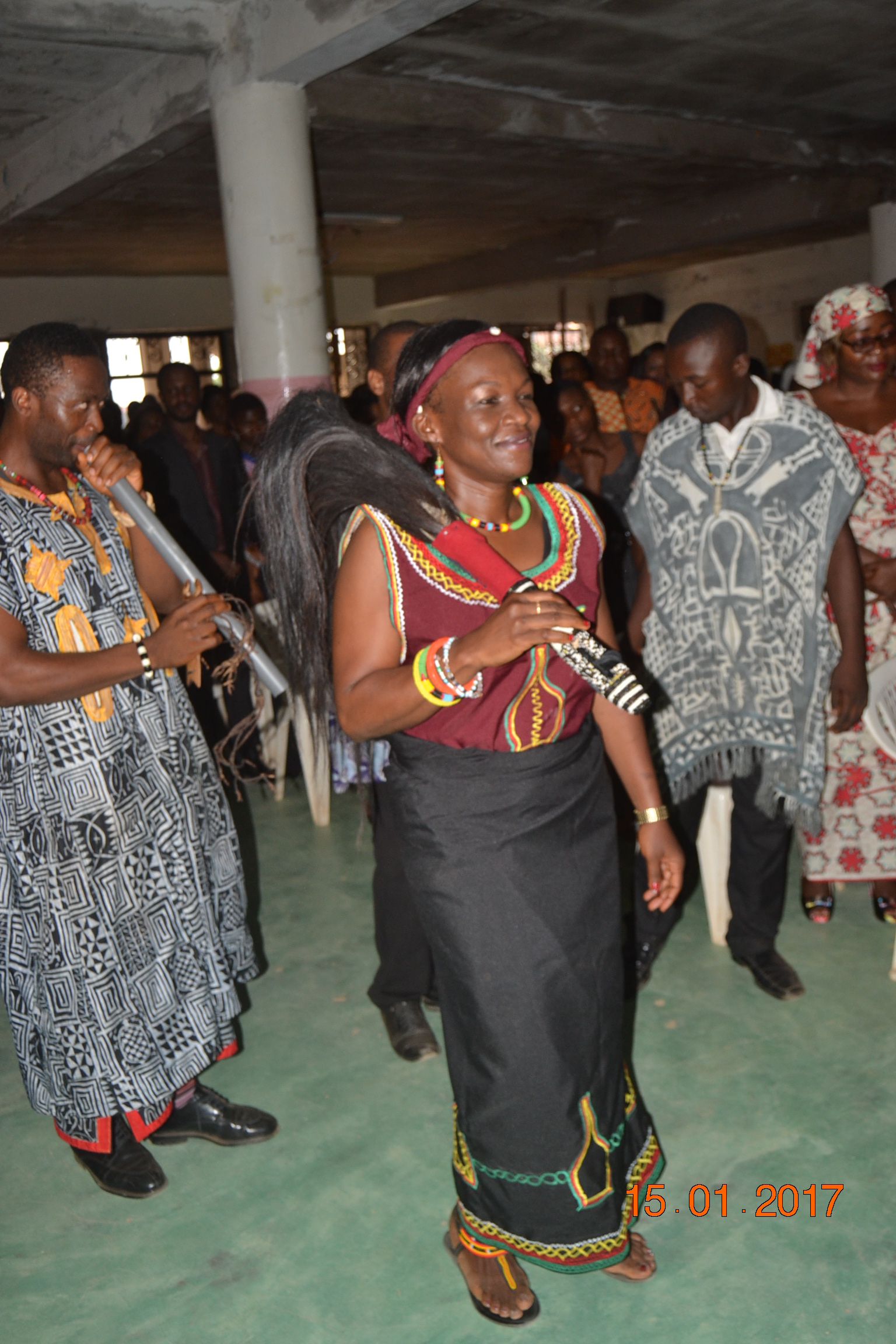

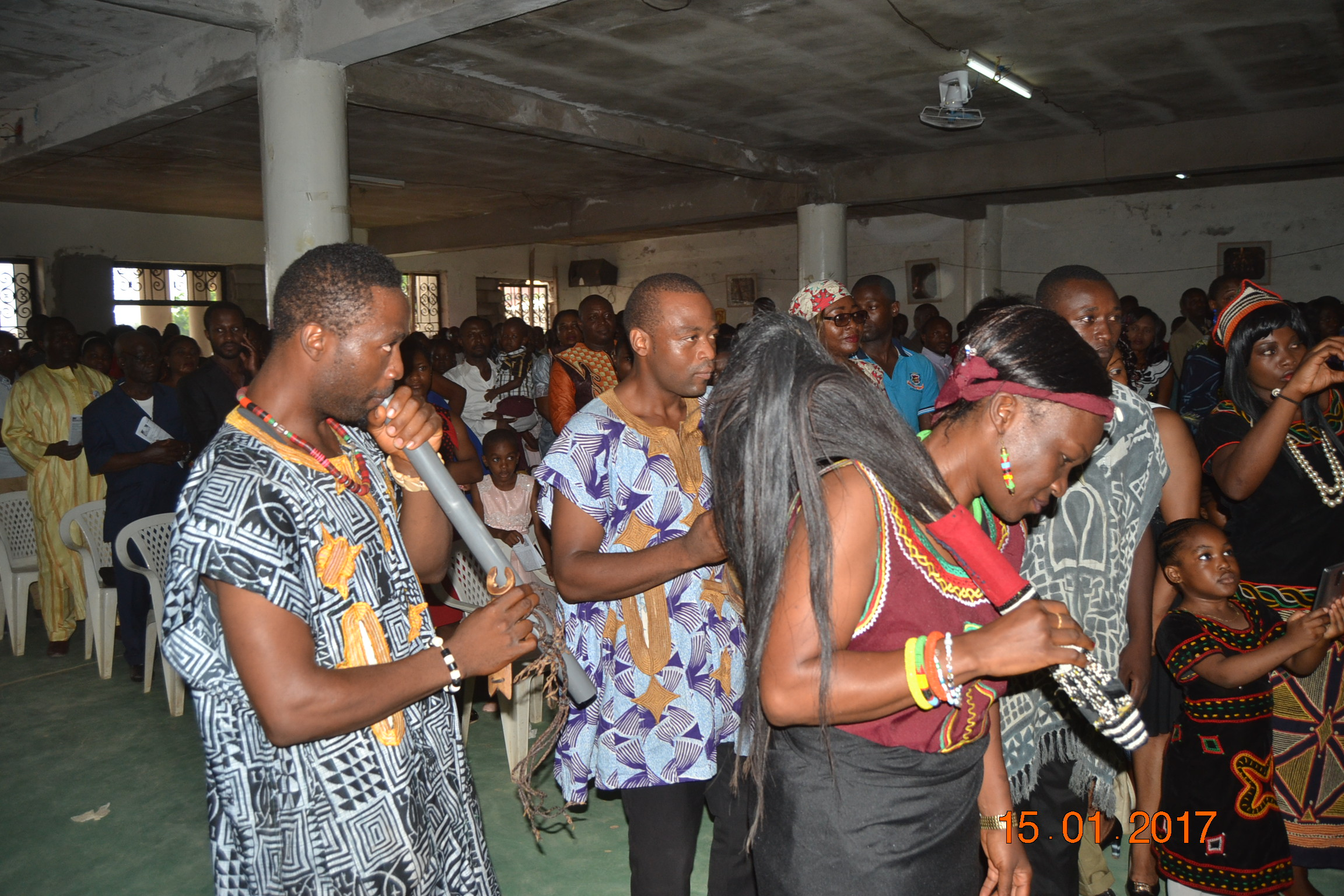

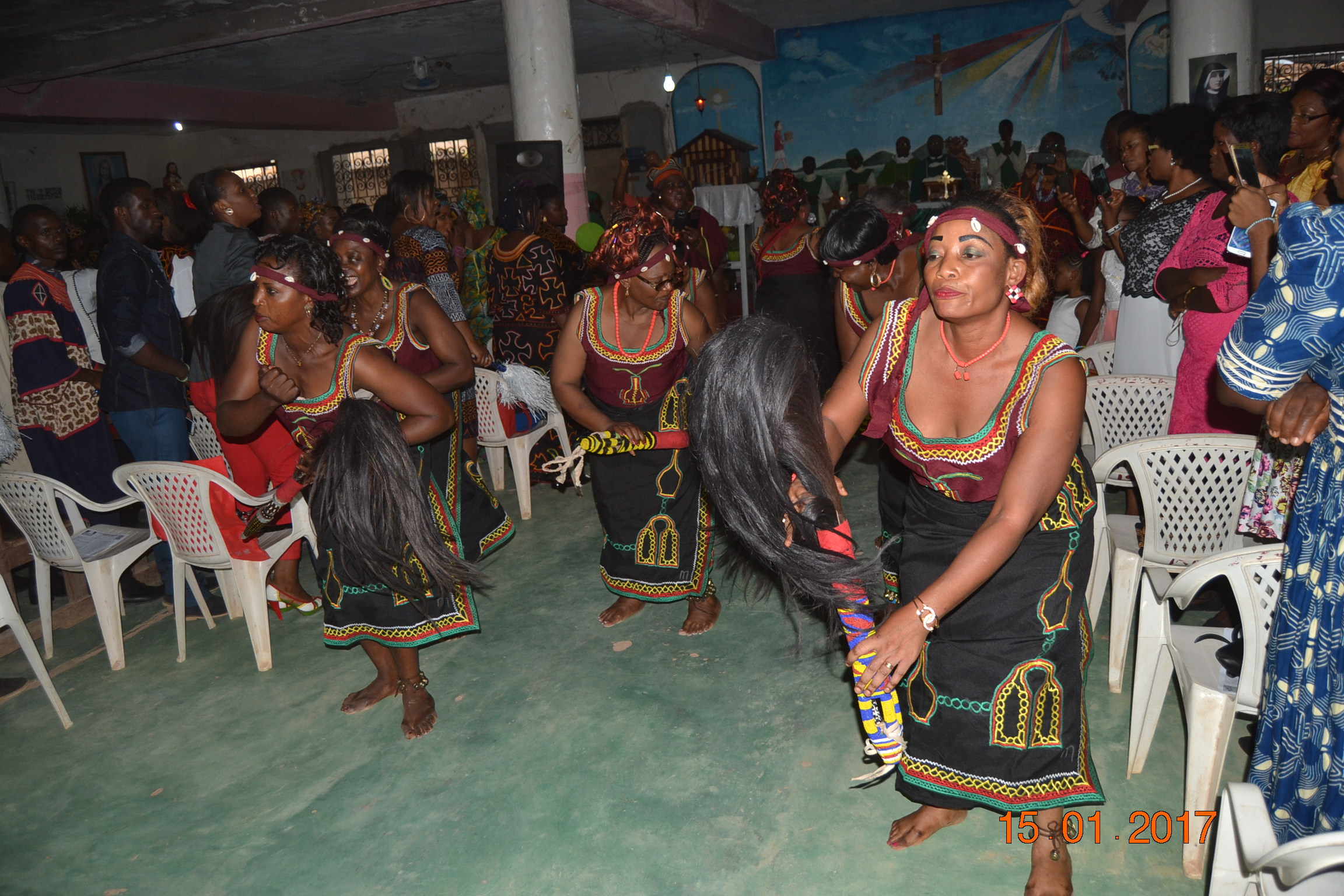

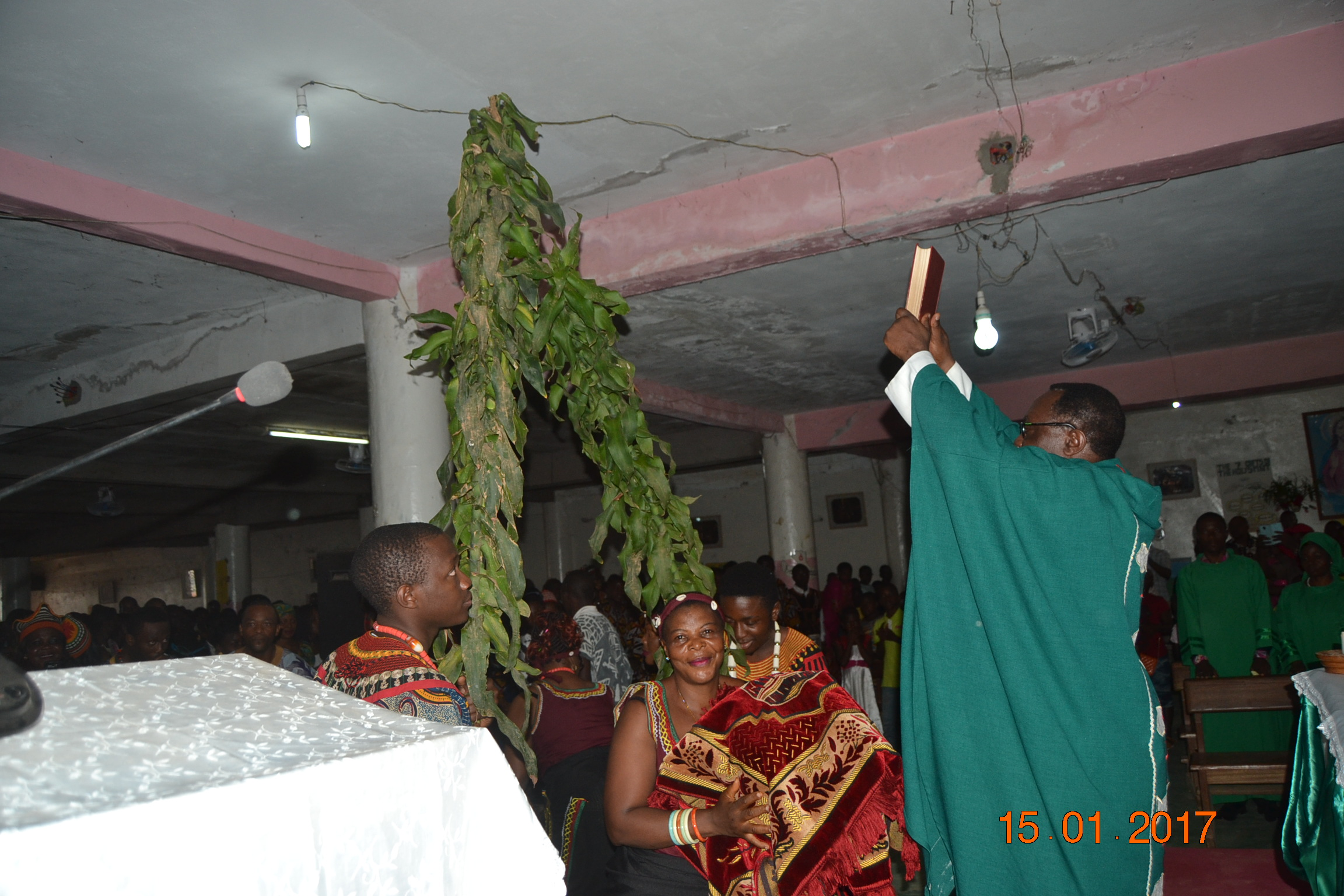

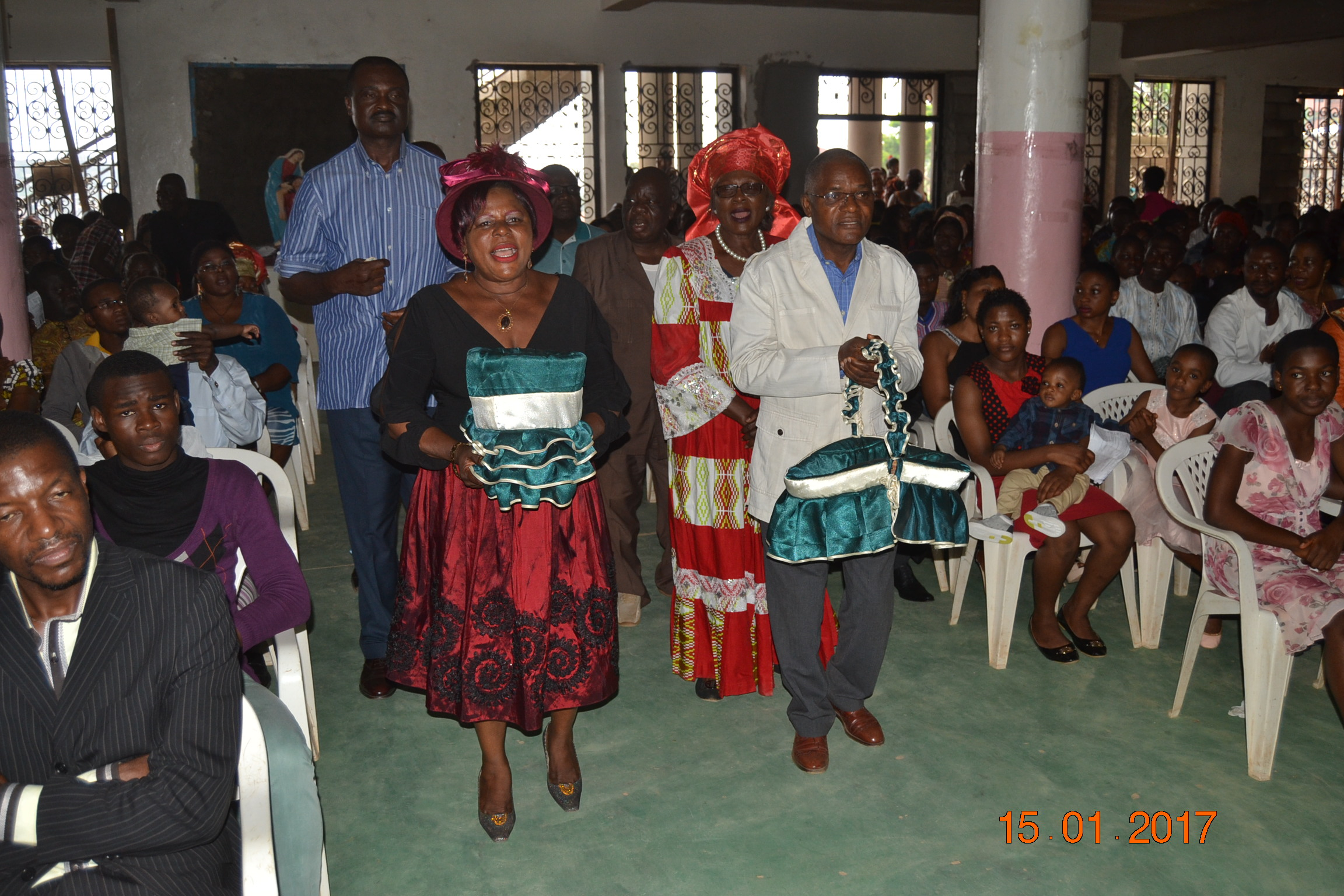

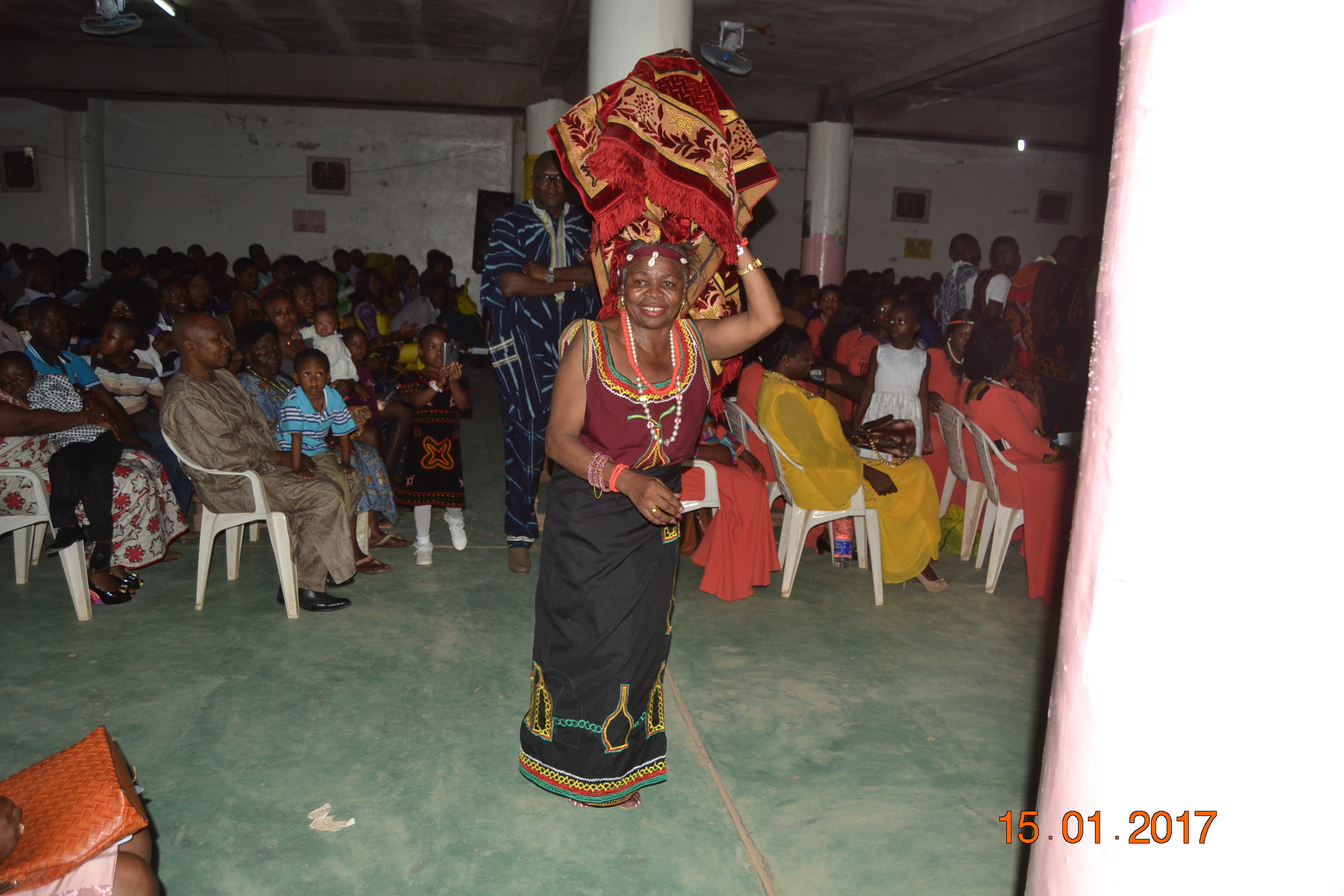

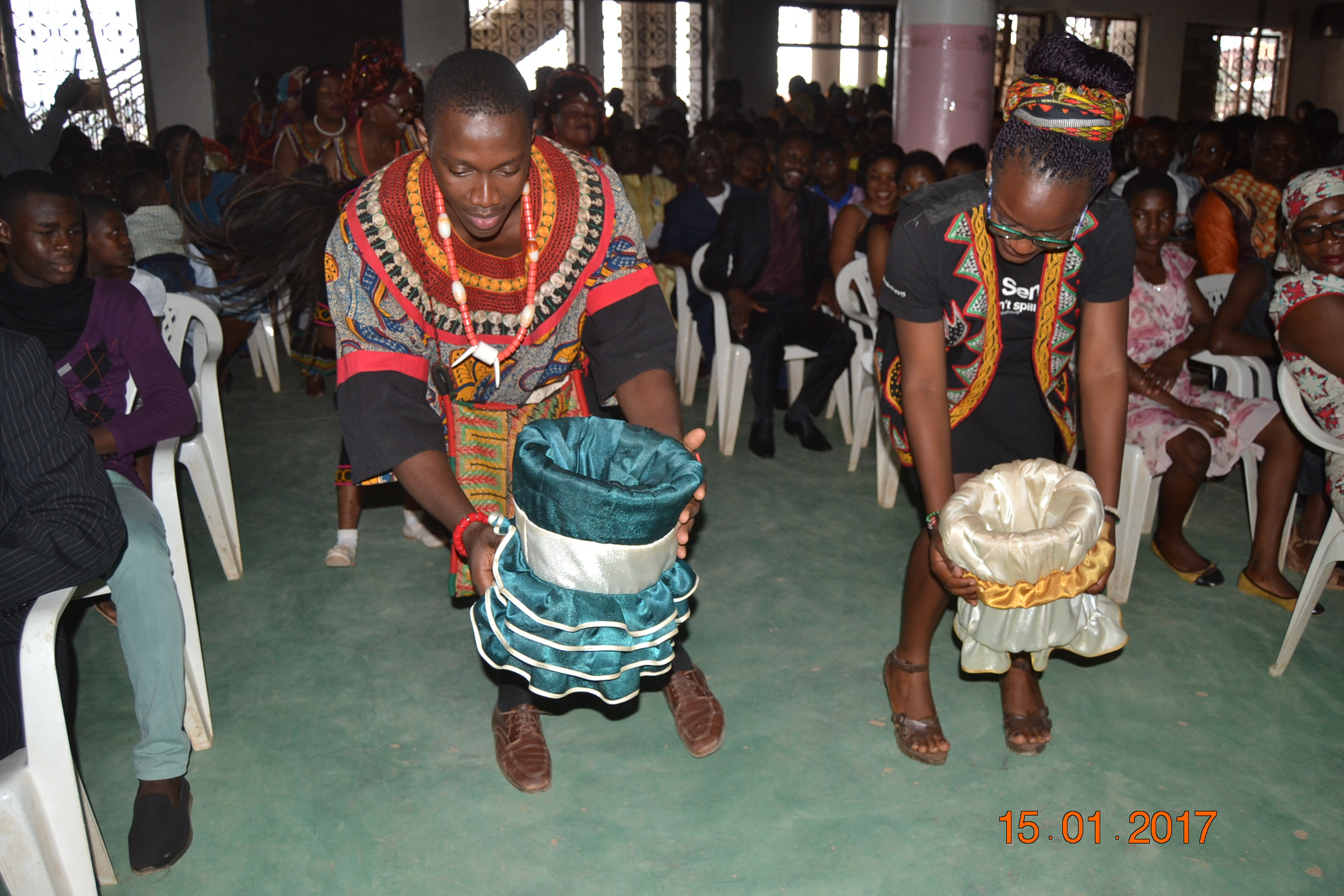

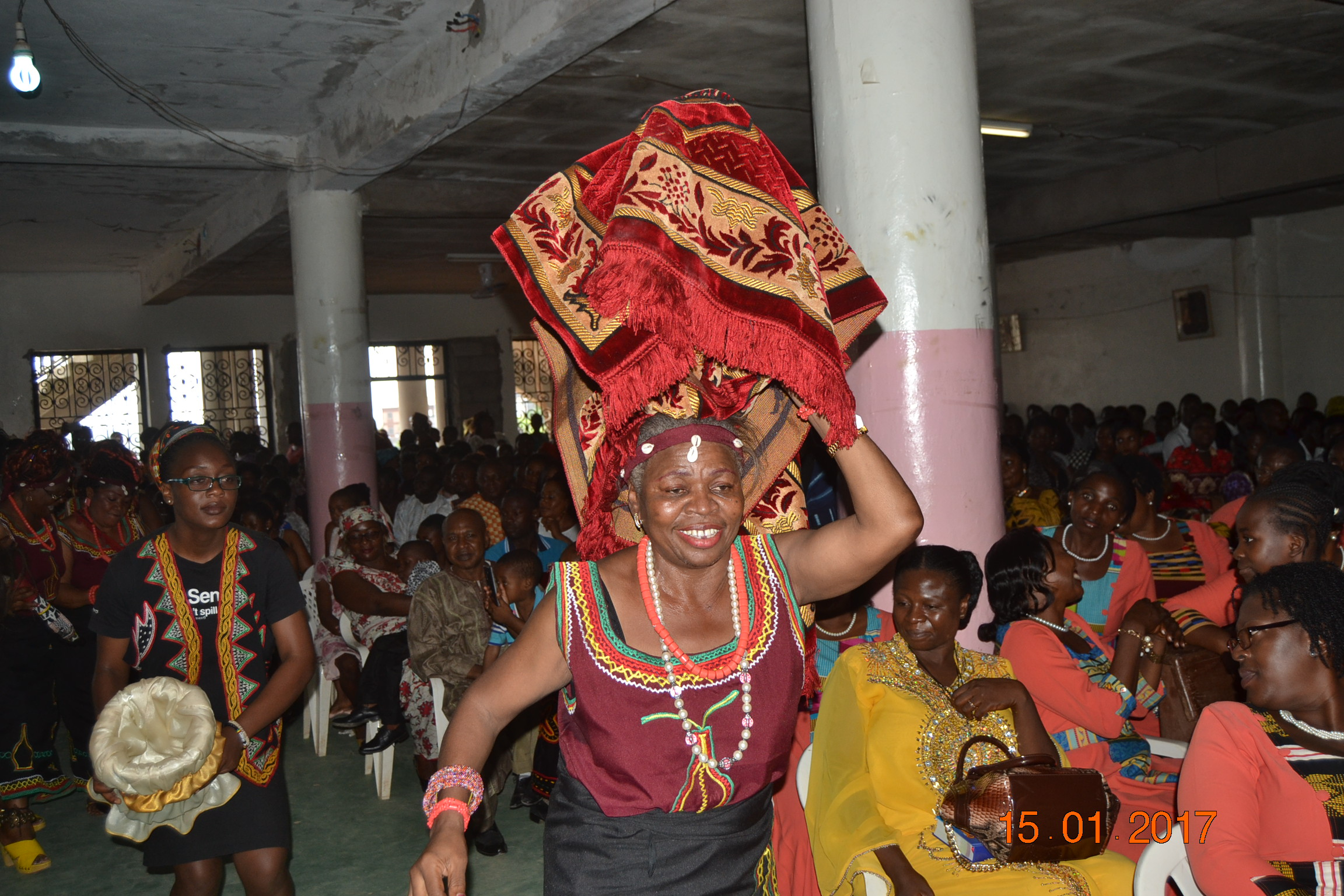
