= Mankon language =

Grassfields language of Cameroon

Mankon
- Ngemba
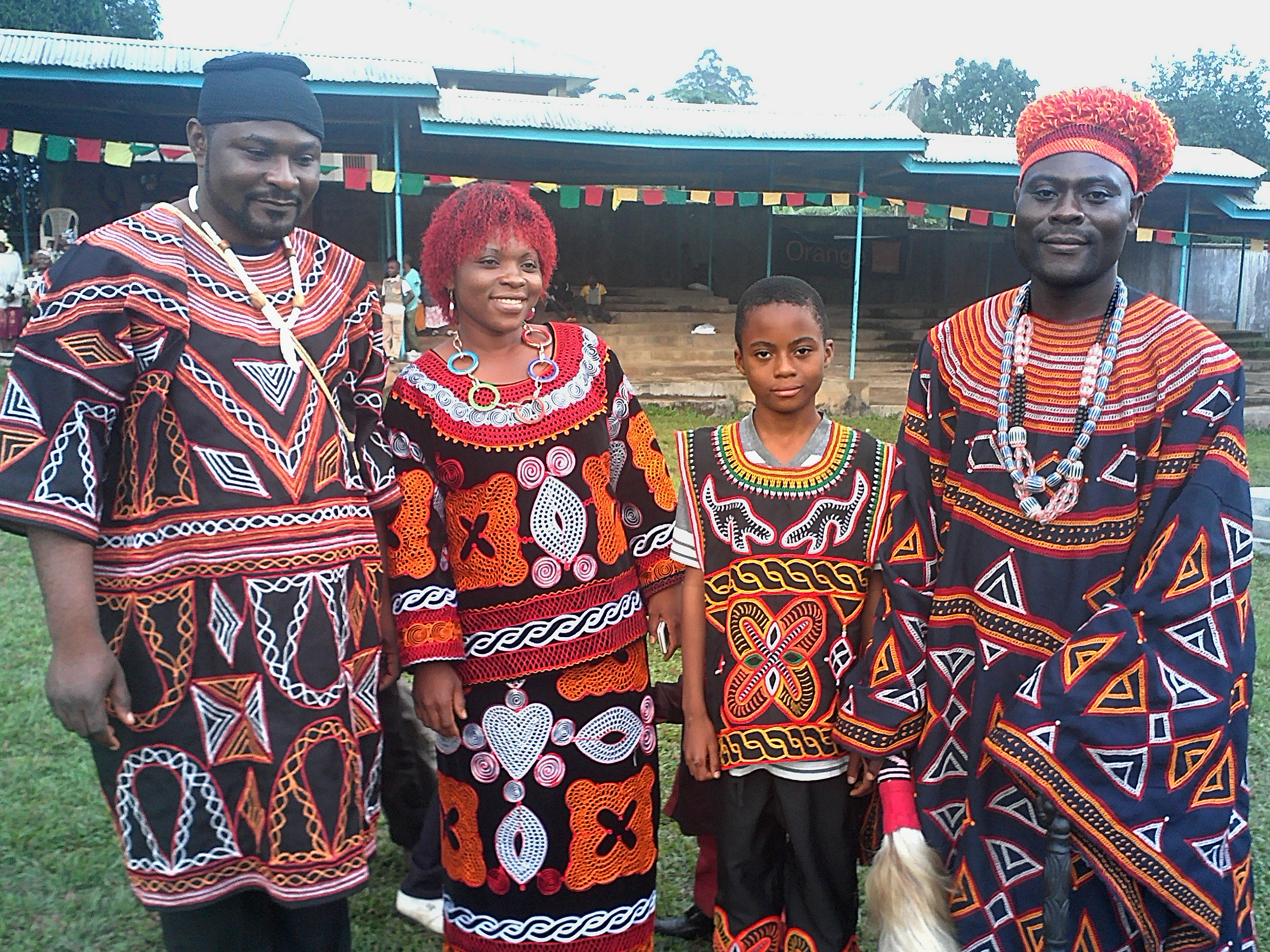
- Traditional Ngemba clothes
- Native to: Cameroon
- Native speakers: 19,000 (2002) (together with Mundum)
- Language family: Niger–Congo?: Atlantic–Congo; Volta-Congo; Benue–Congo; Bantoid; Southern Bantoid; Grassfields; Eastern Grassfields; Mbam-Nkam; Ngemba; Mankon

Language codes
- ISO 639-3: nge (Mankon–Mundum)
- Glottolog: ngem1255 Ngemba (Mankon–Mundum)

Mankon is a Grassfields language spoken in Cameroon. It is closely related to Mundum and Mendankwe-Nkwen. Along with Mundum, it is called Ngemba. There are several distinct dialects: Mankunge (Ngemba), Nsongwa (Songwa, Bangwa), Shomba (Chomba, Bamechom), Mbutu (Bambutu), Njong (Banjong), Bagangu (Akum) and Alatening.

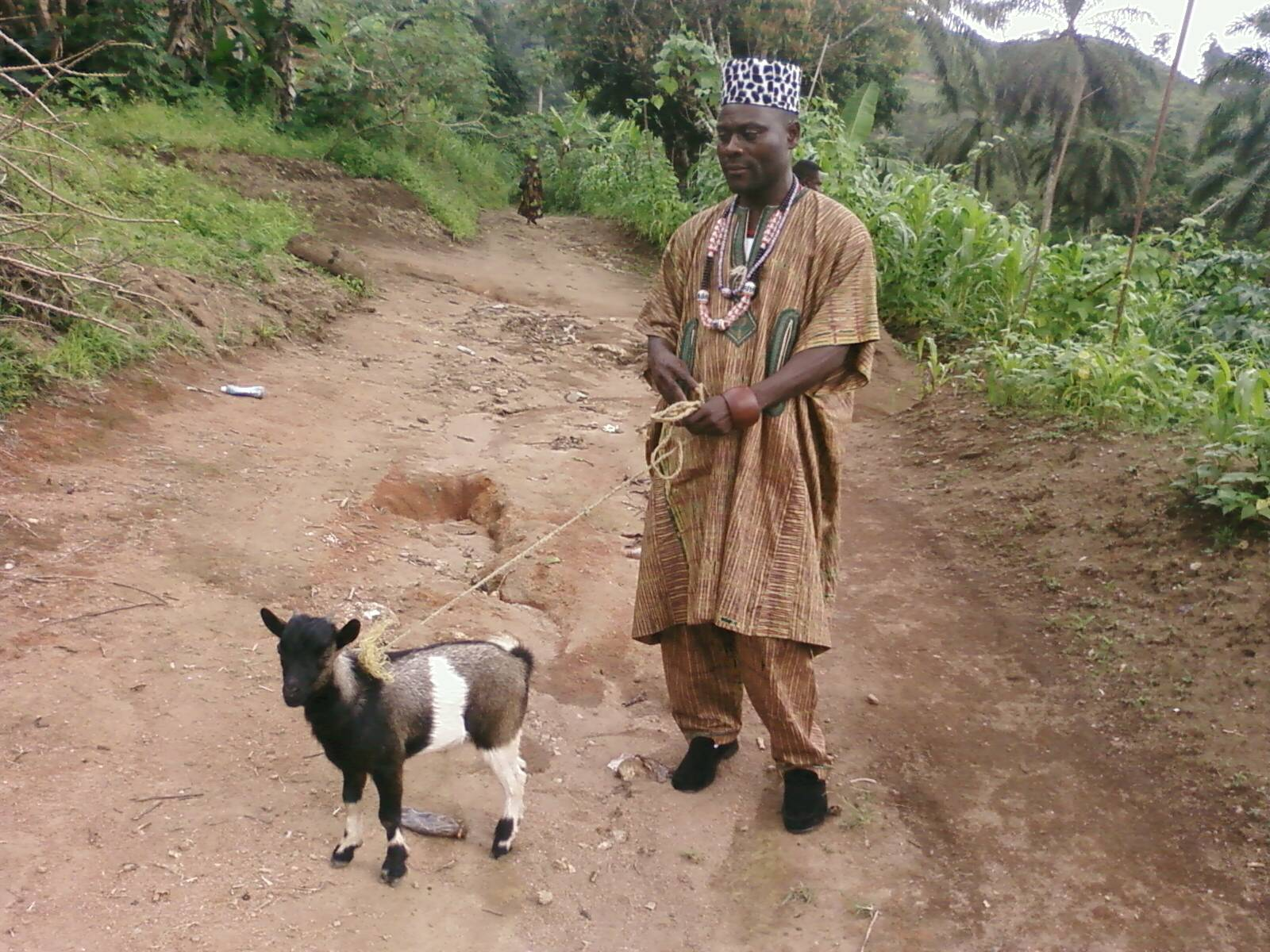
Traditional clothing called Togho

== Culture ==
Festivities among the ngemba

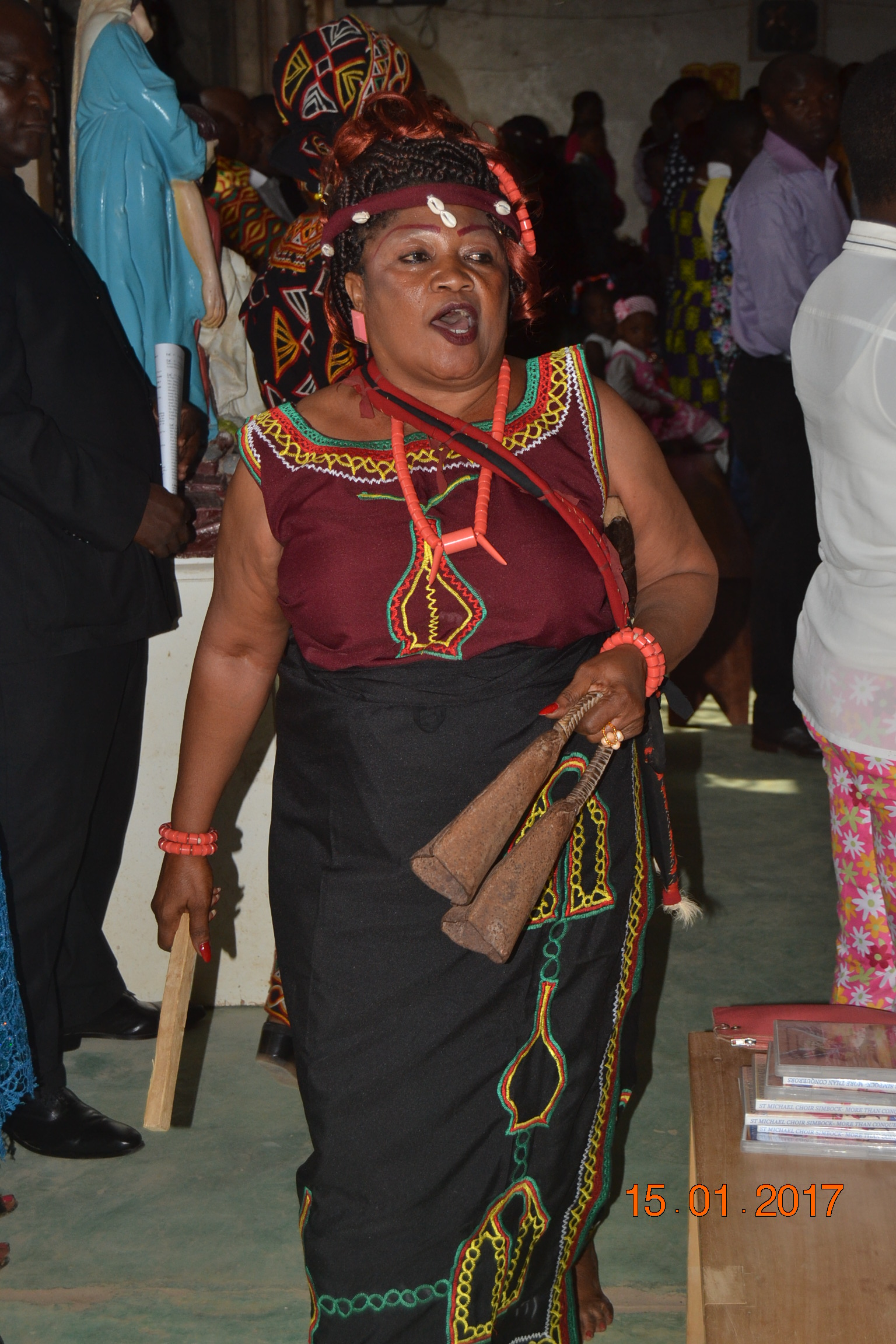

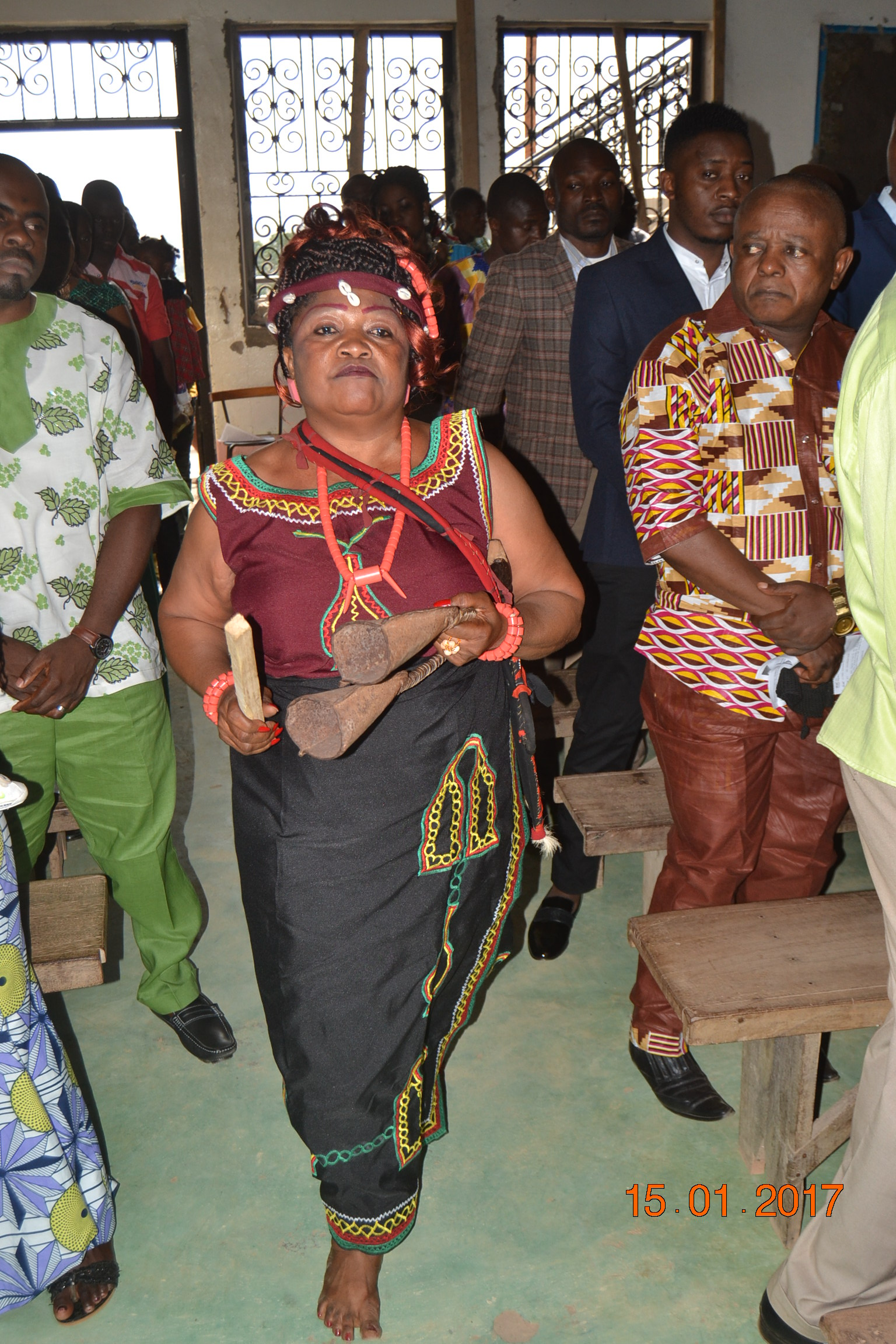

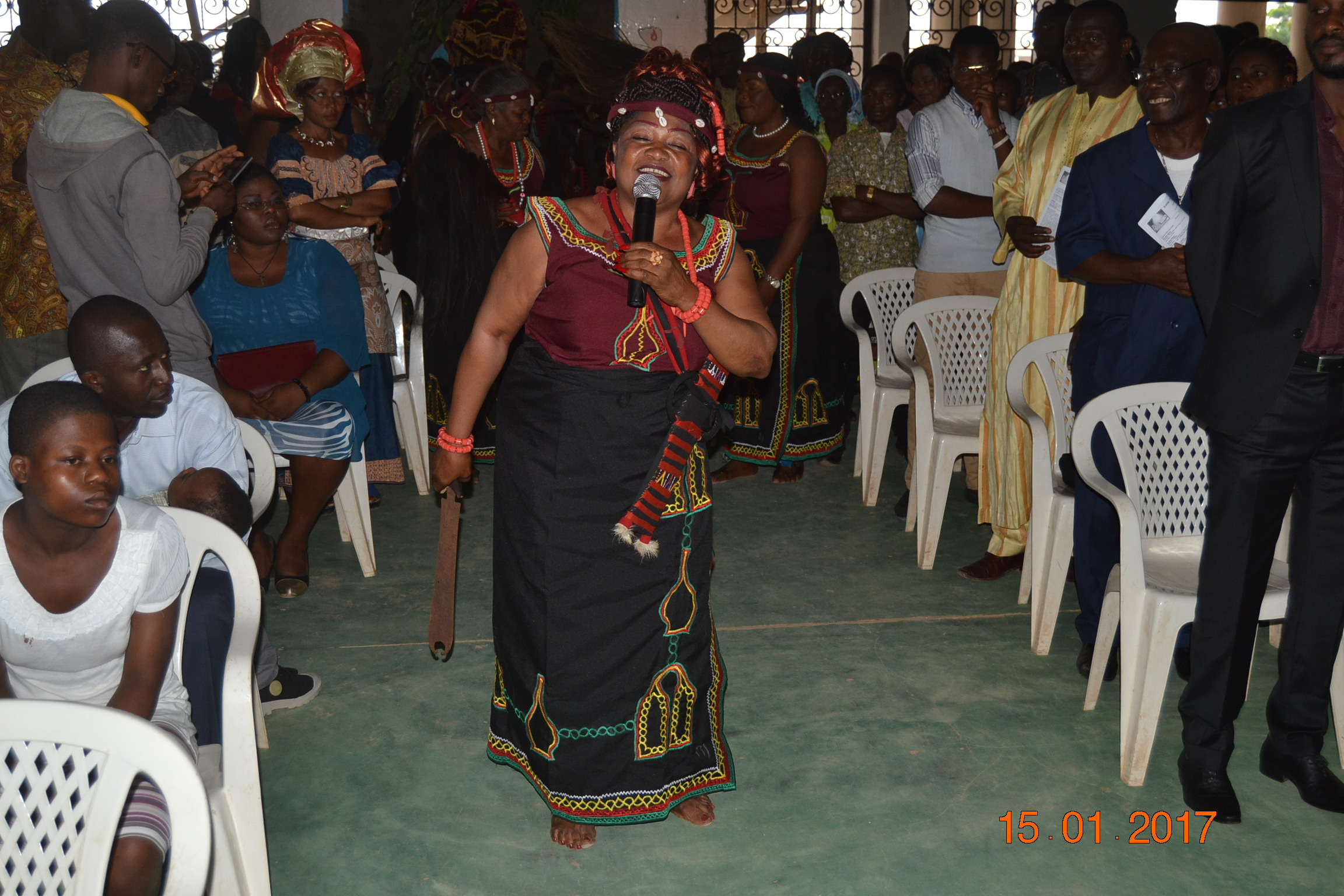

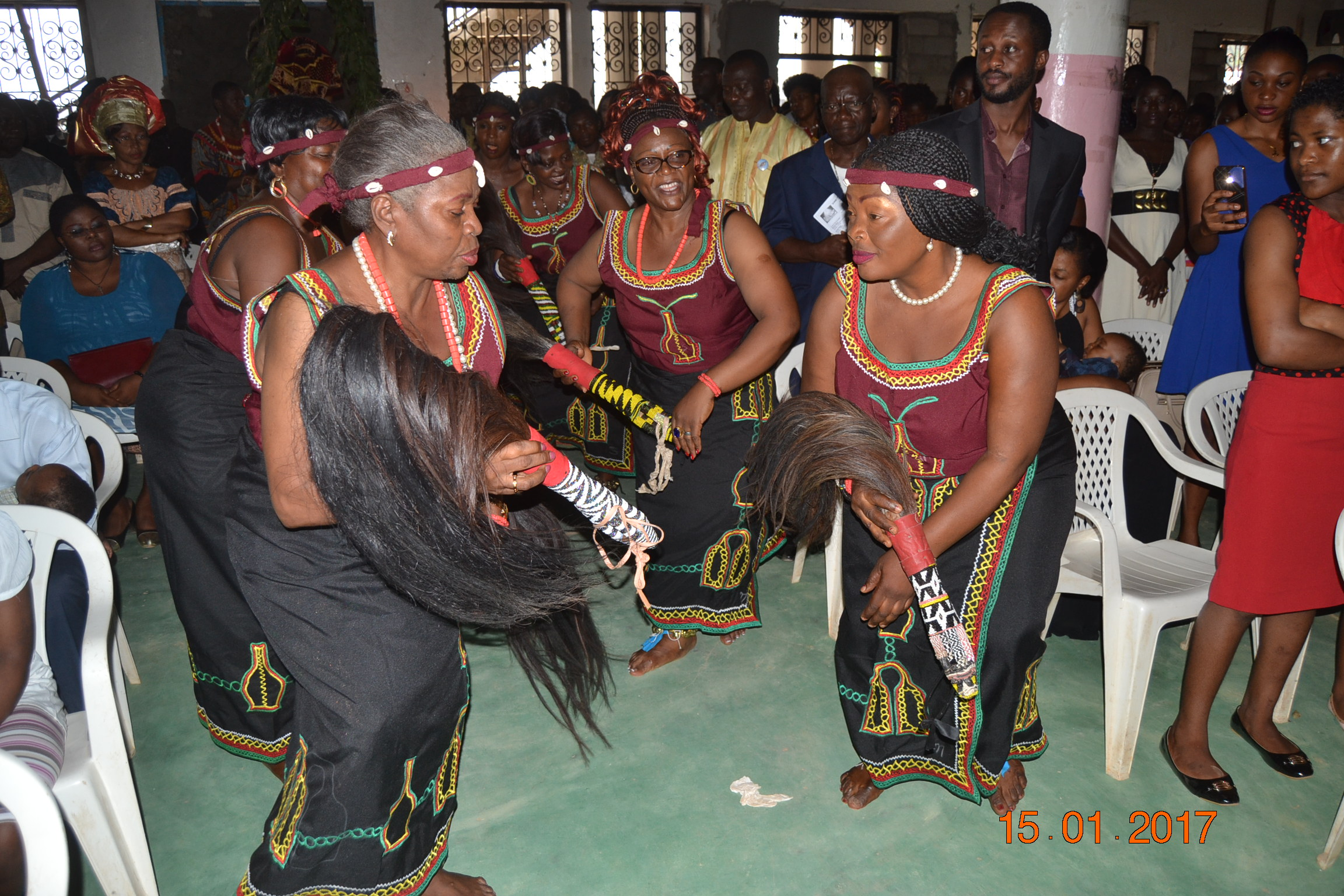

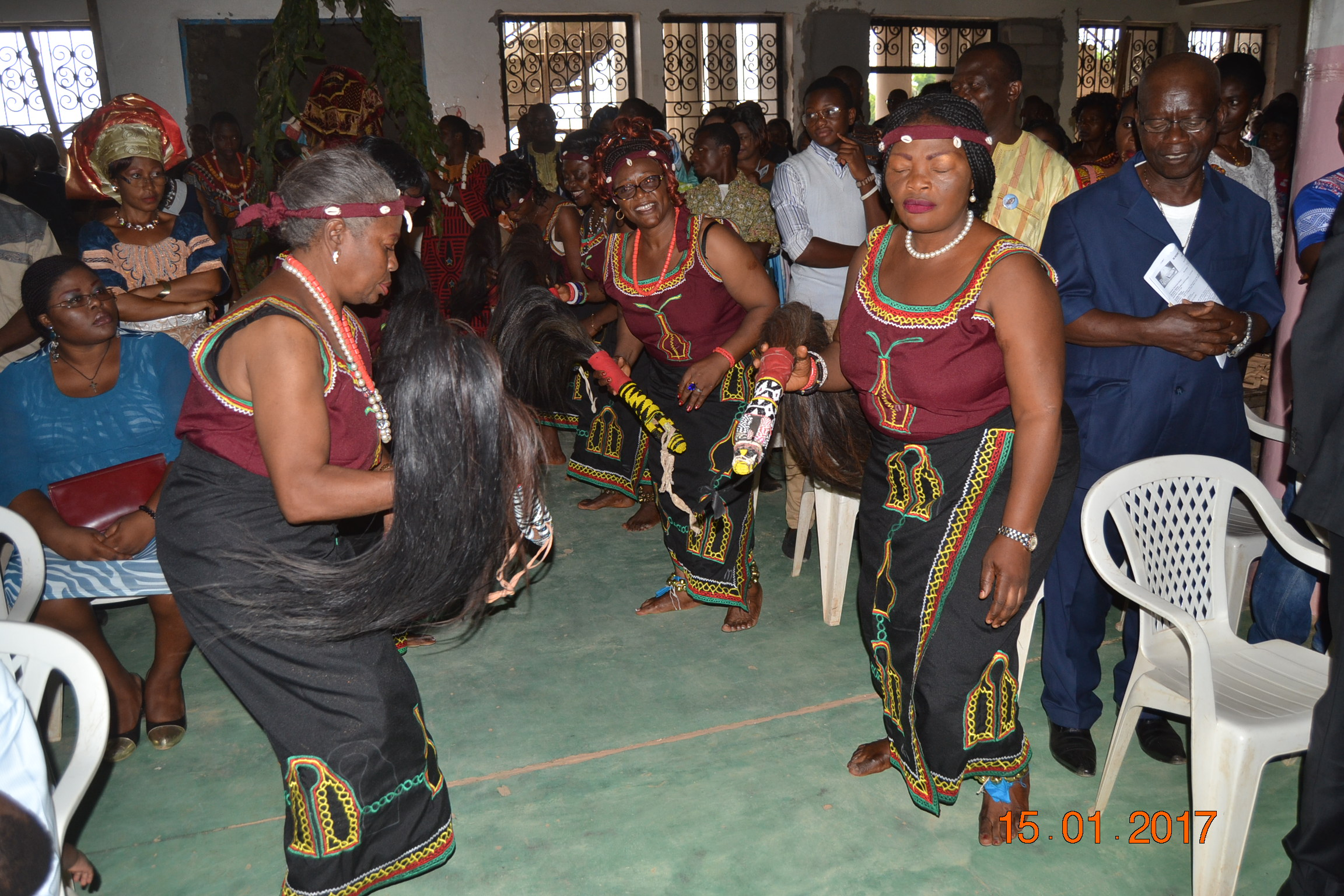

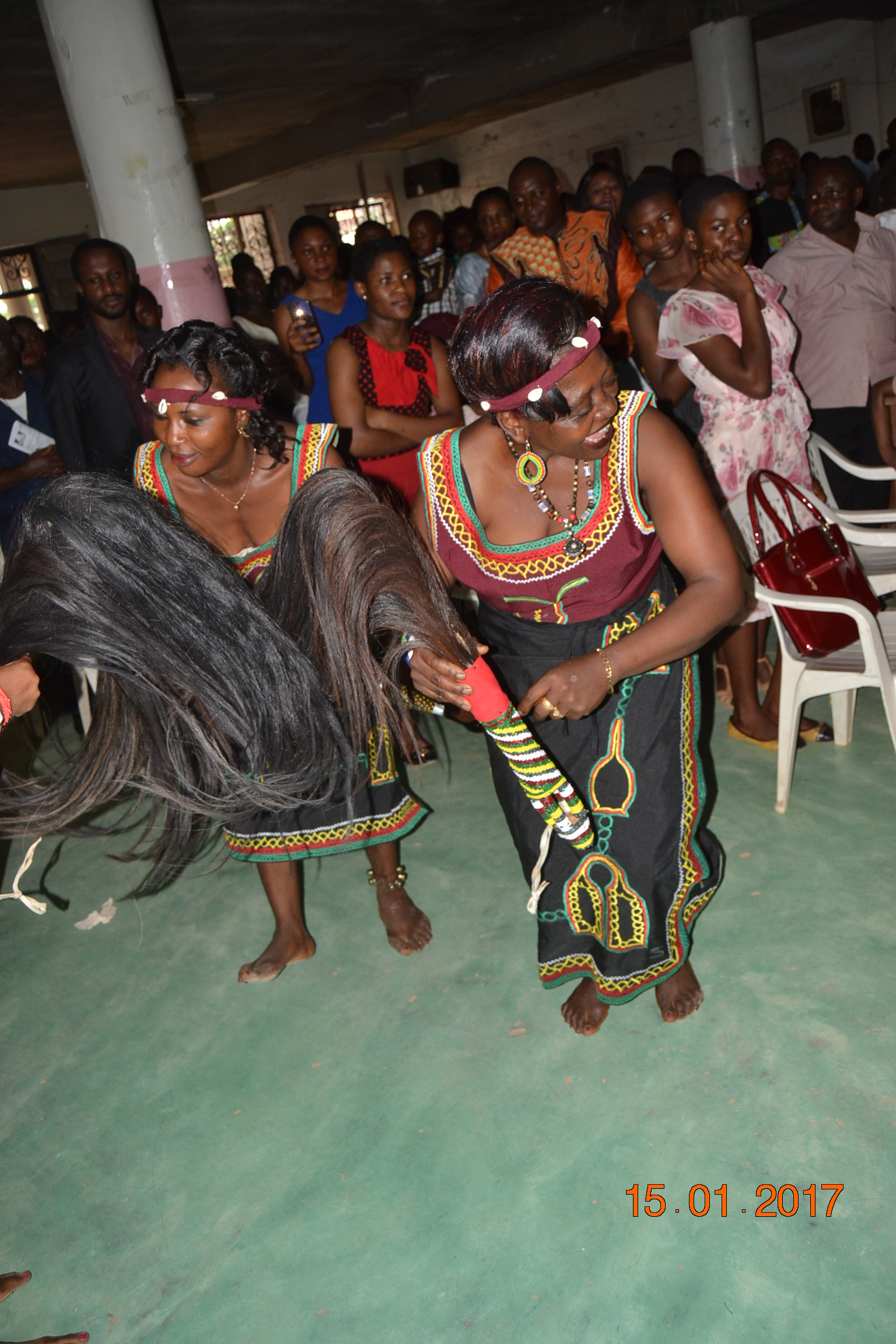

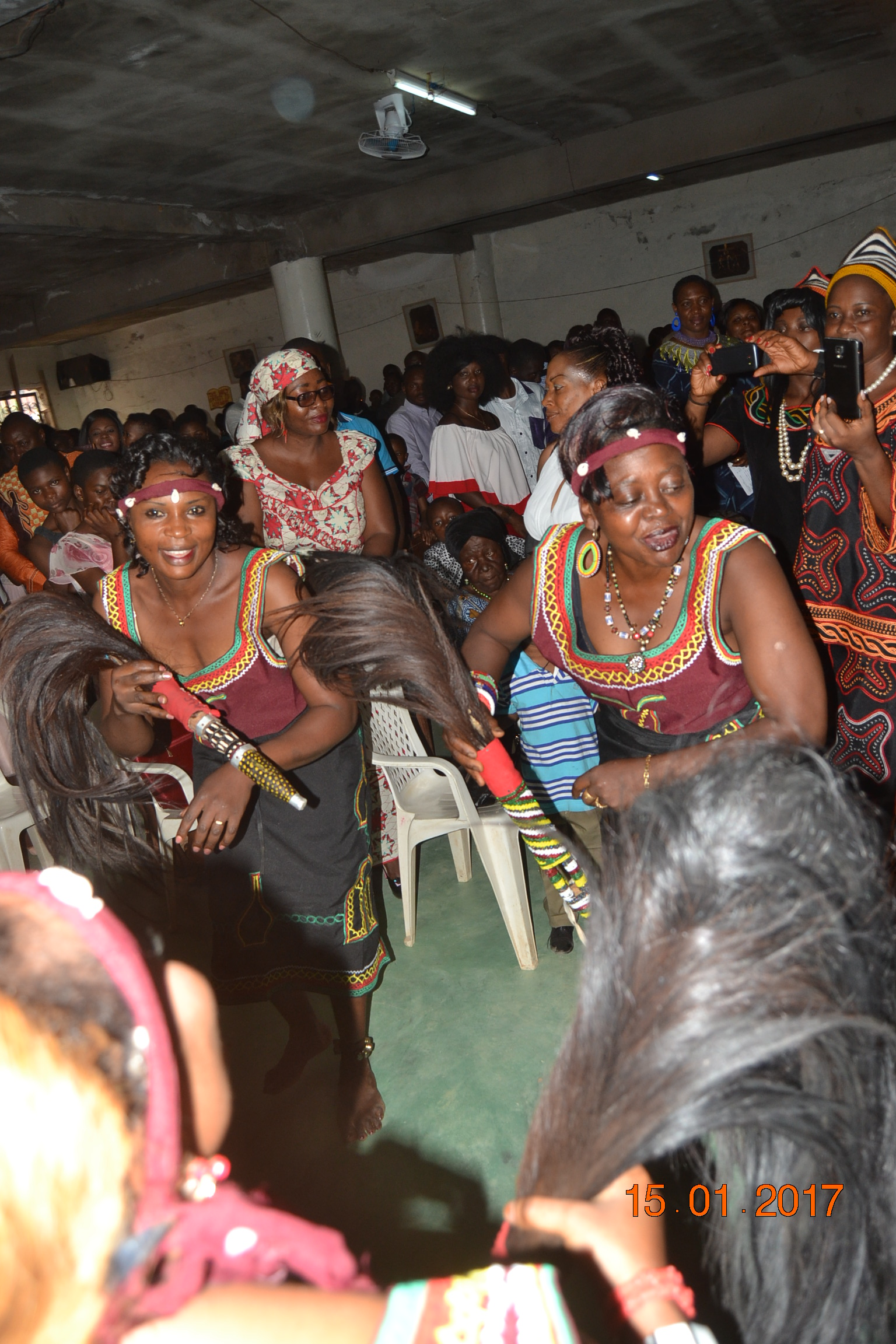

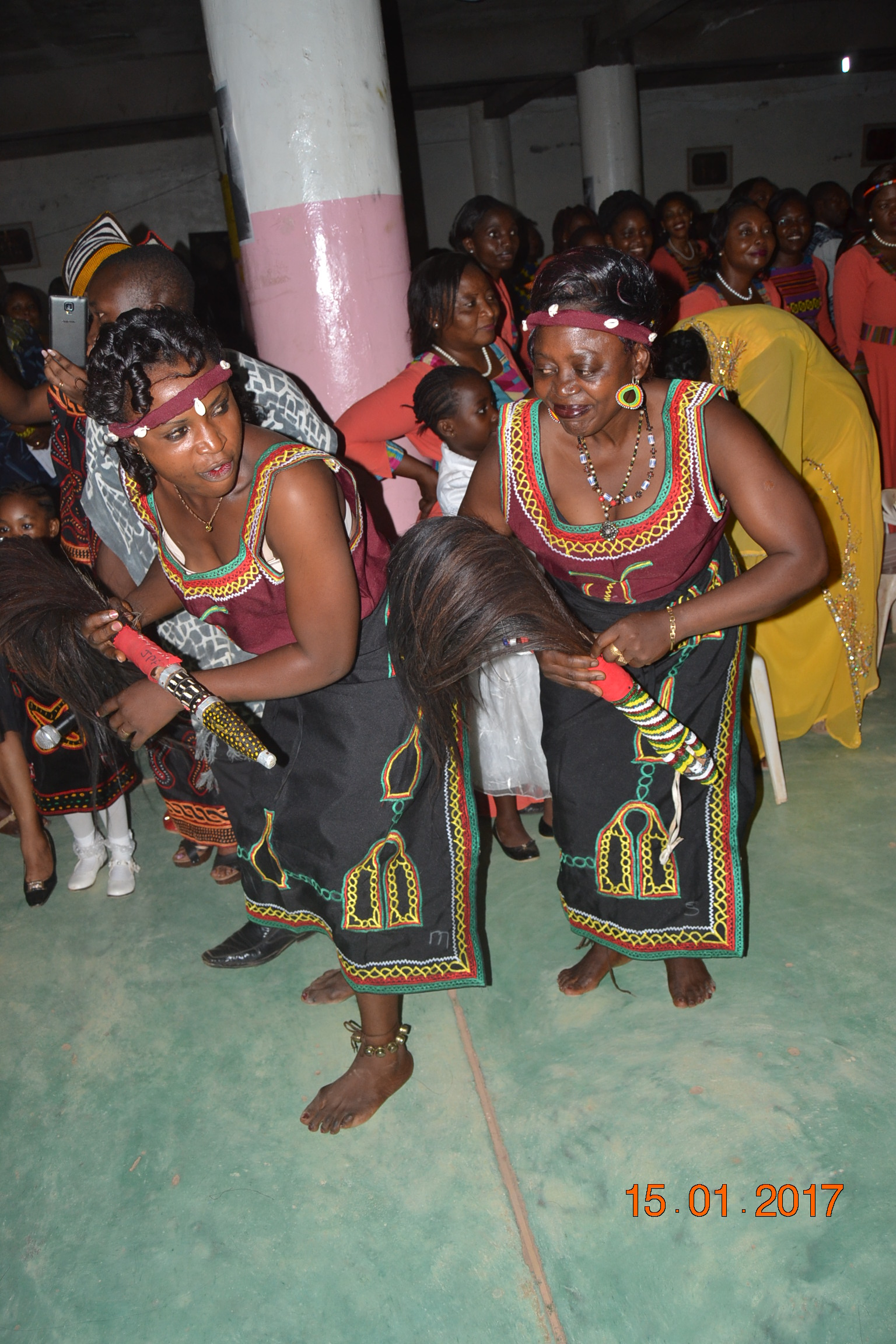

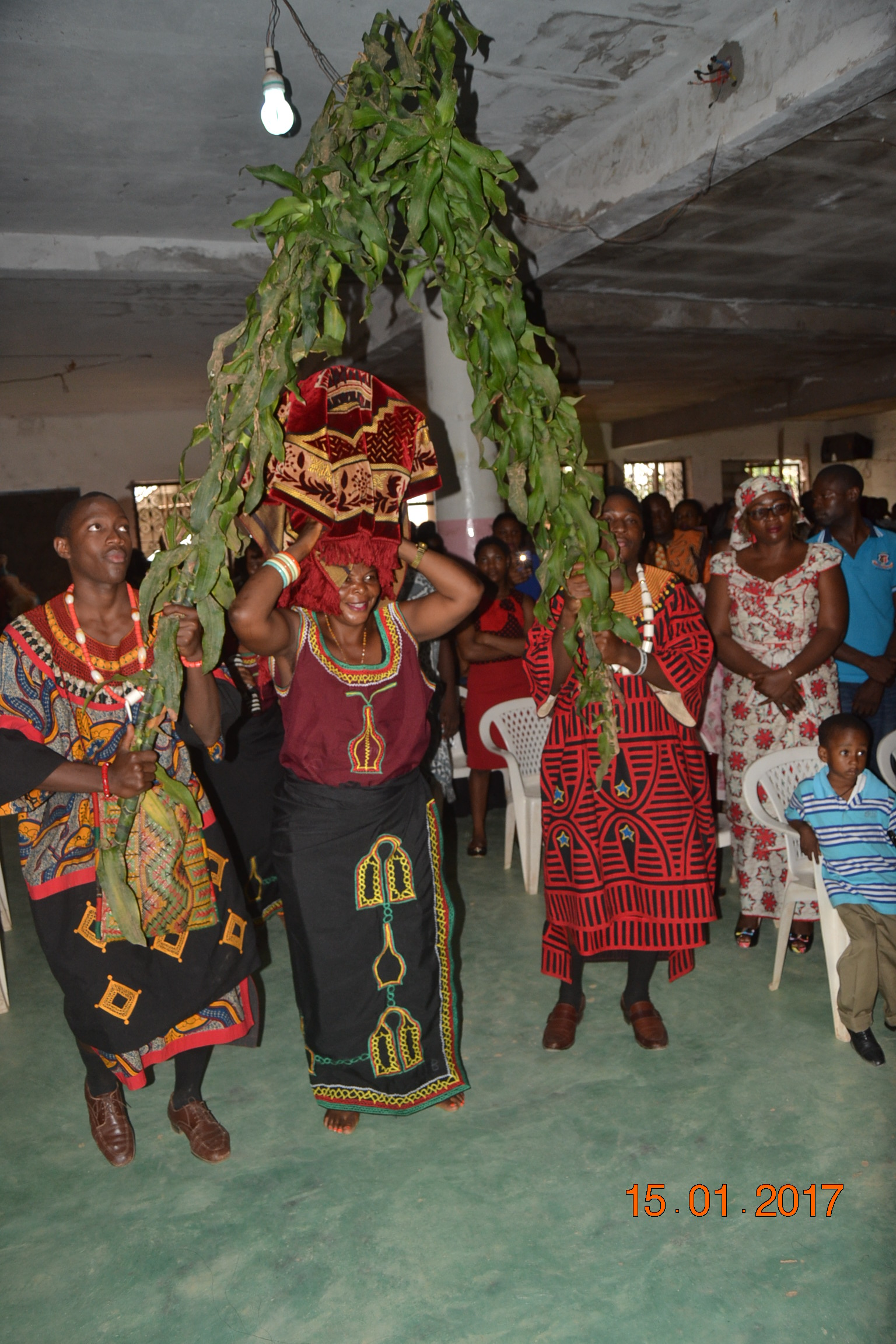

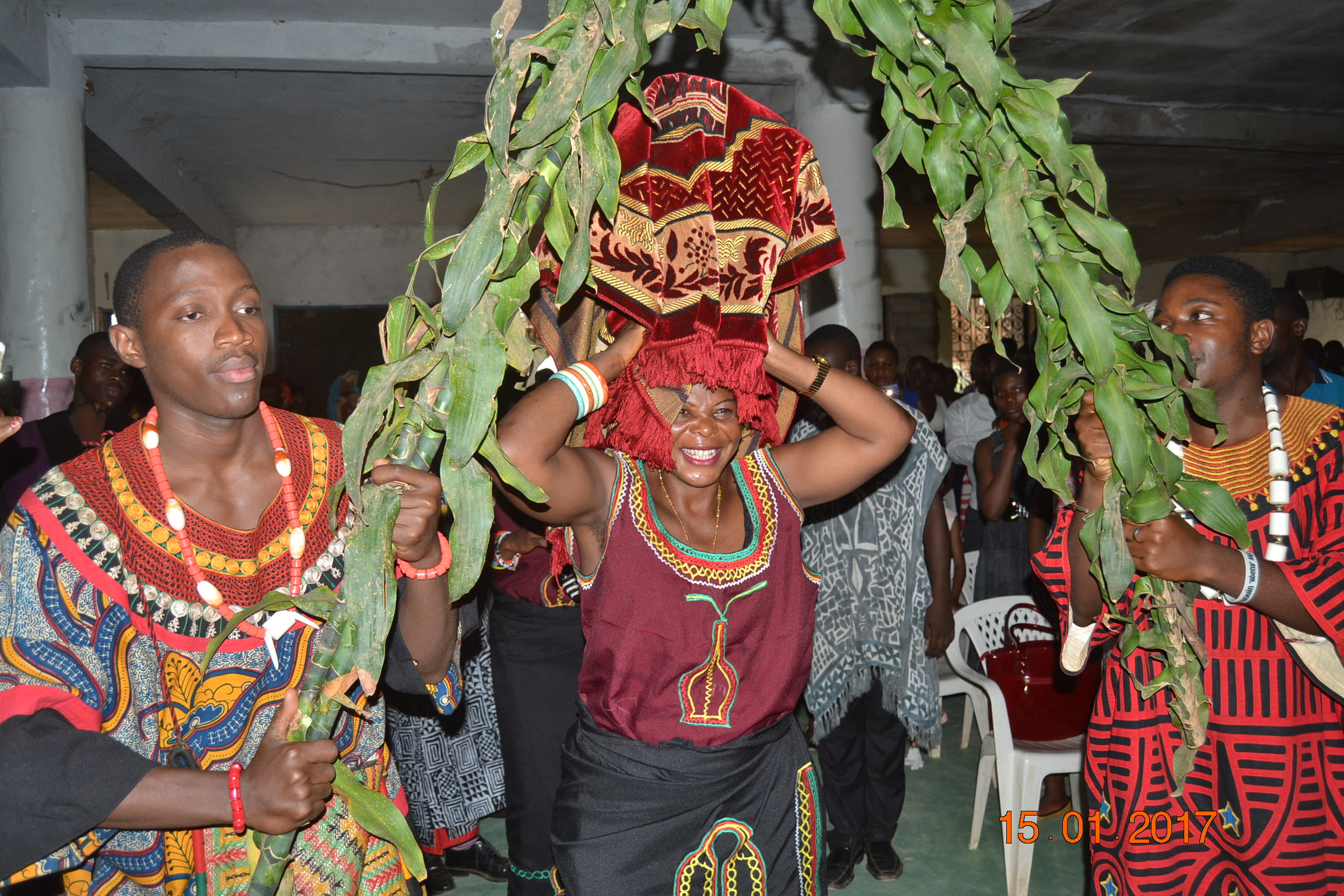

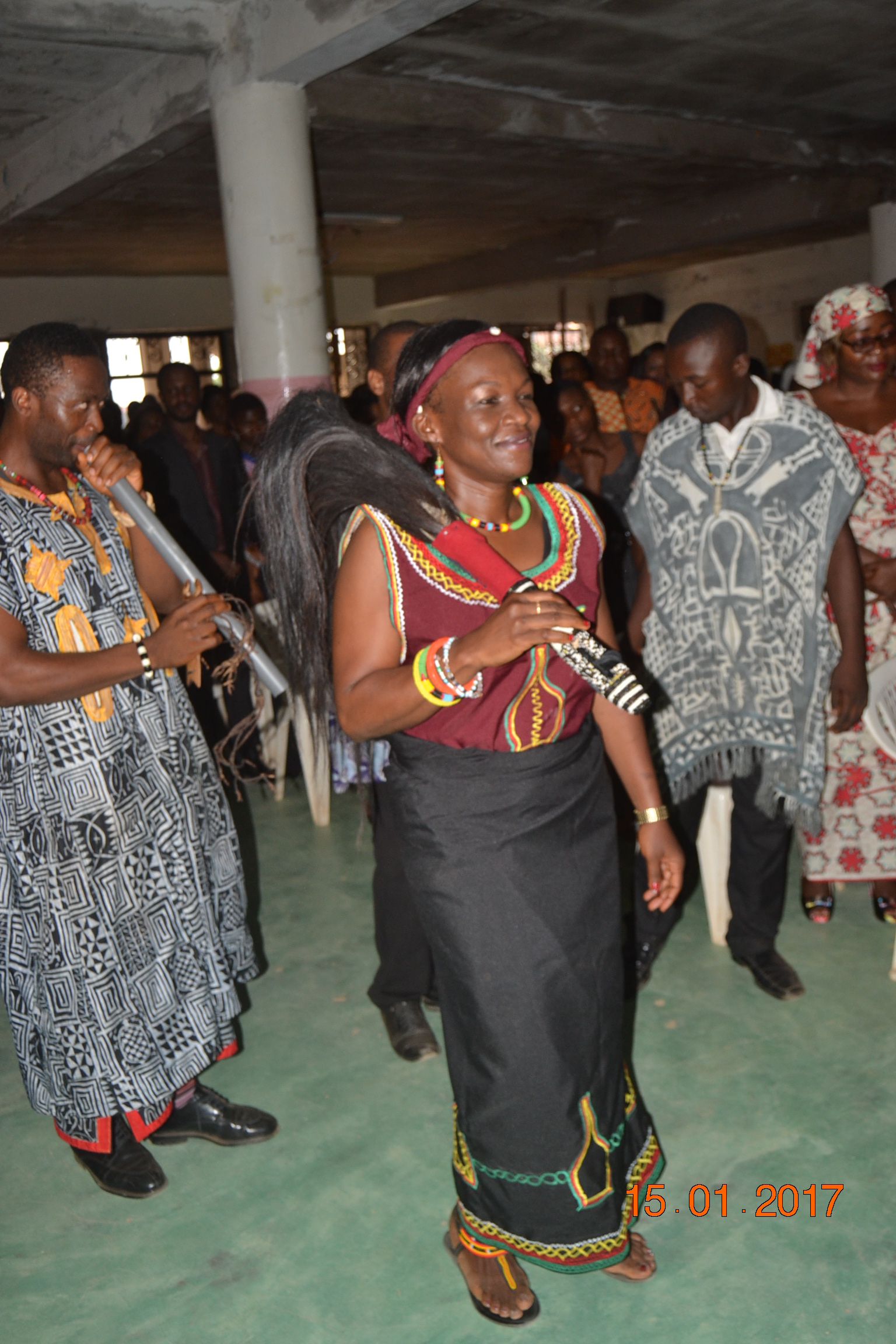

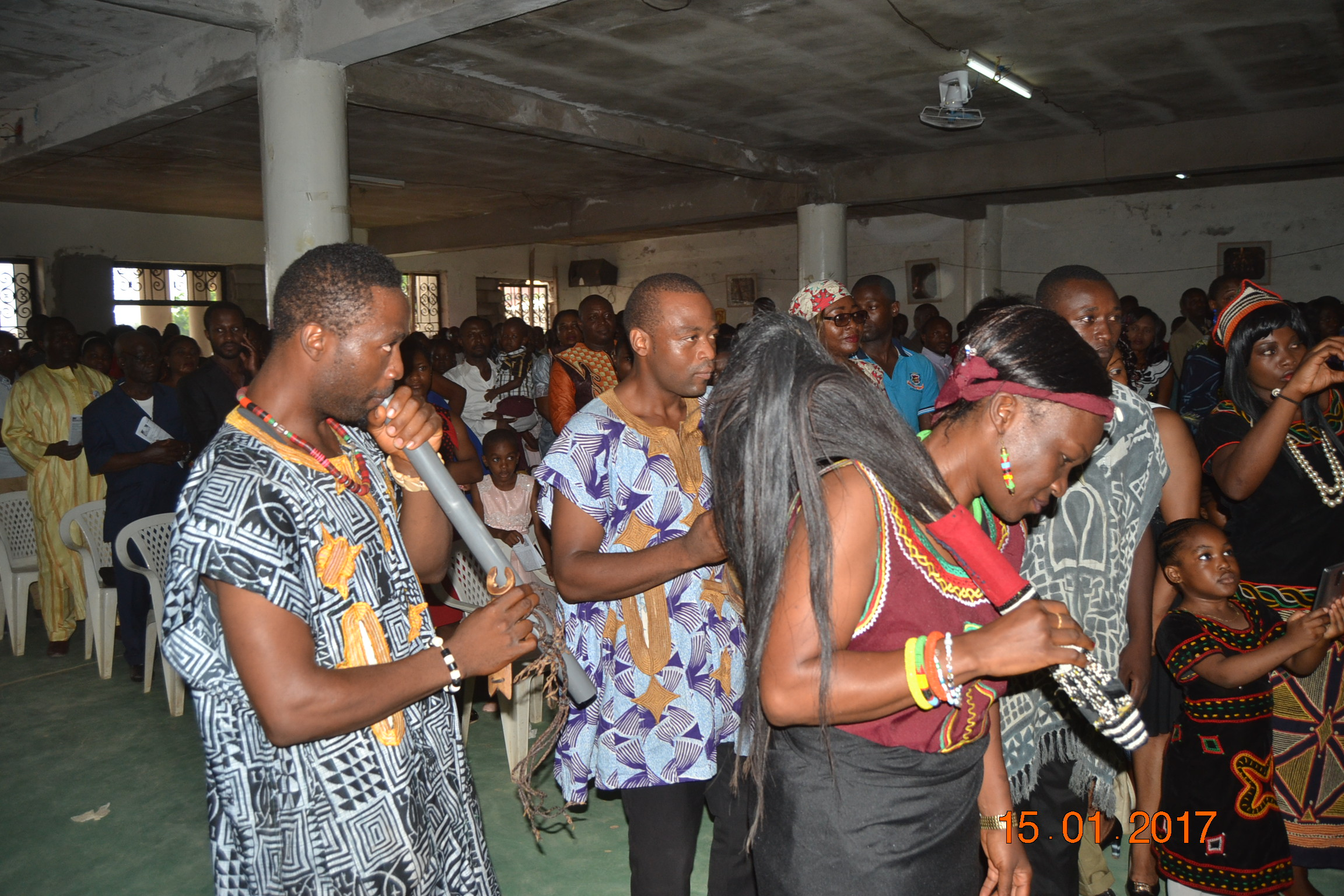

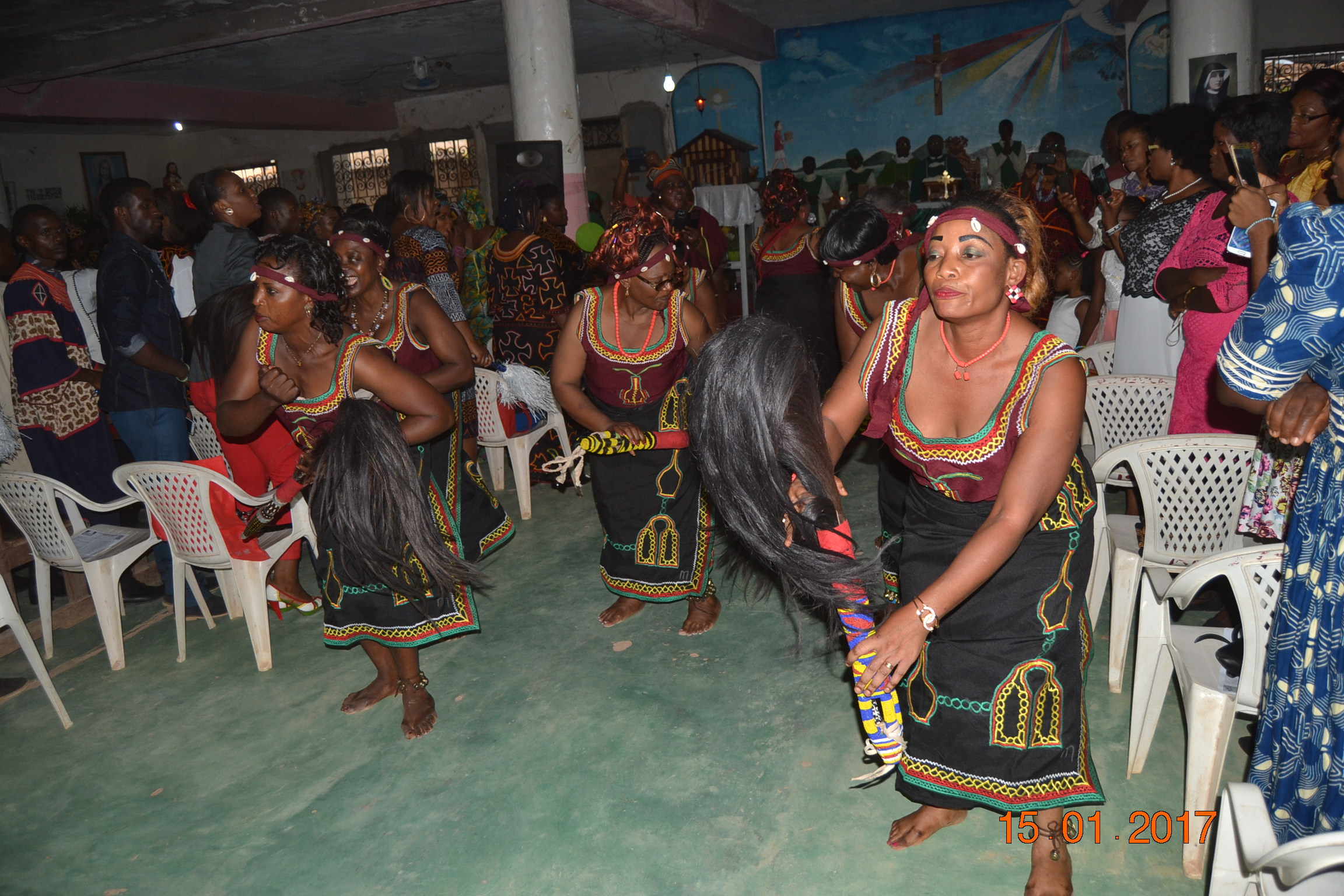

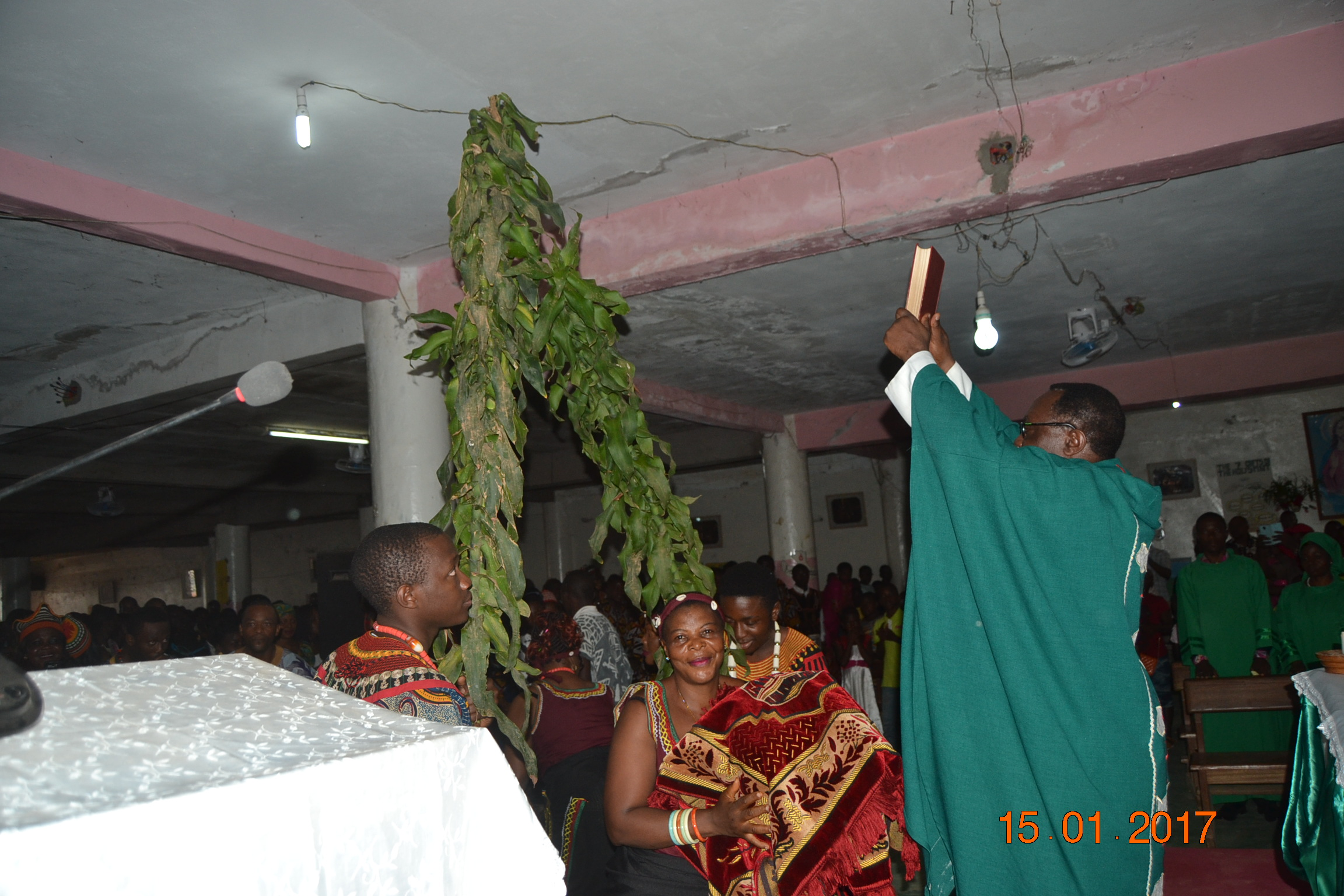

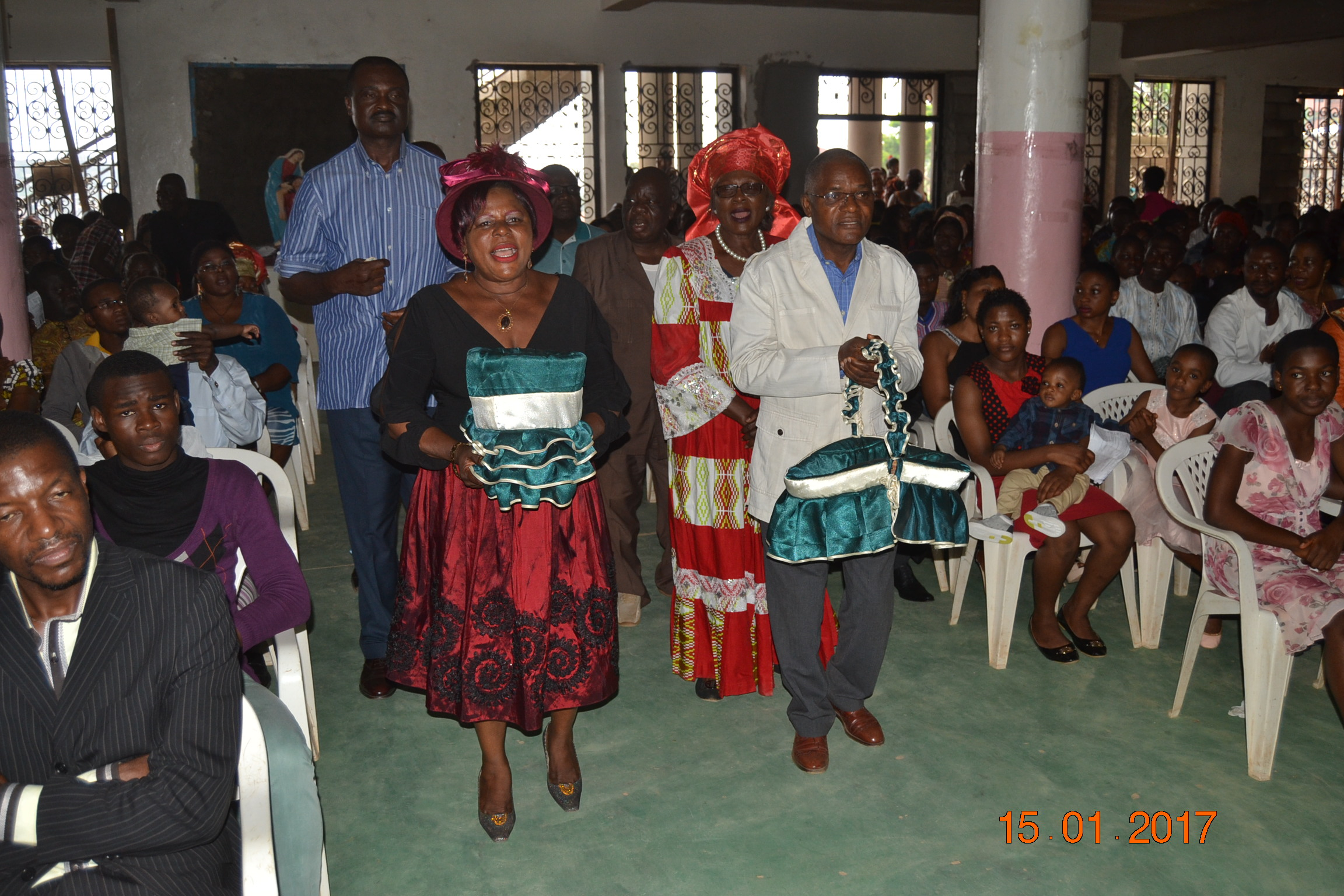

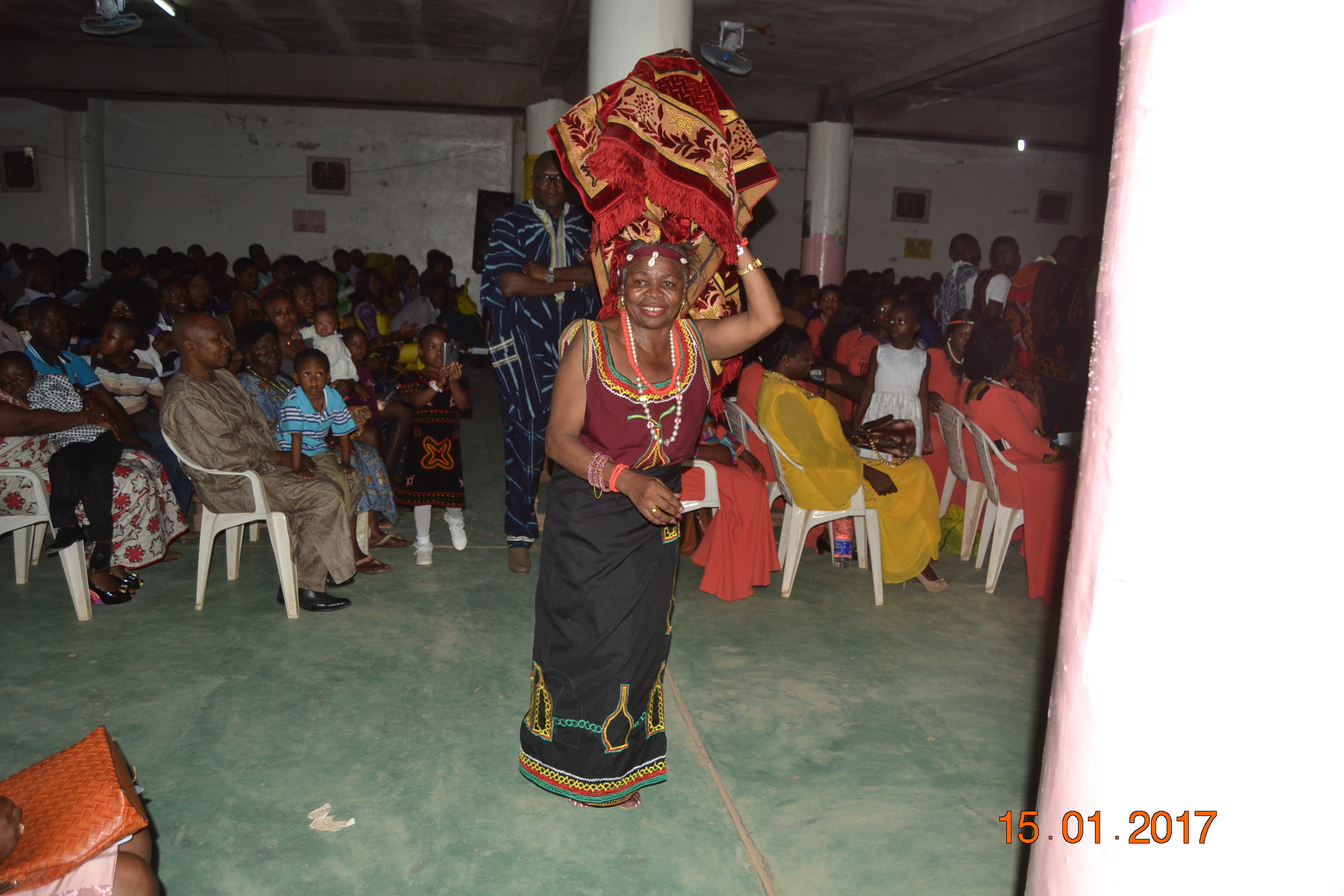

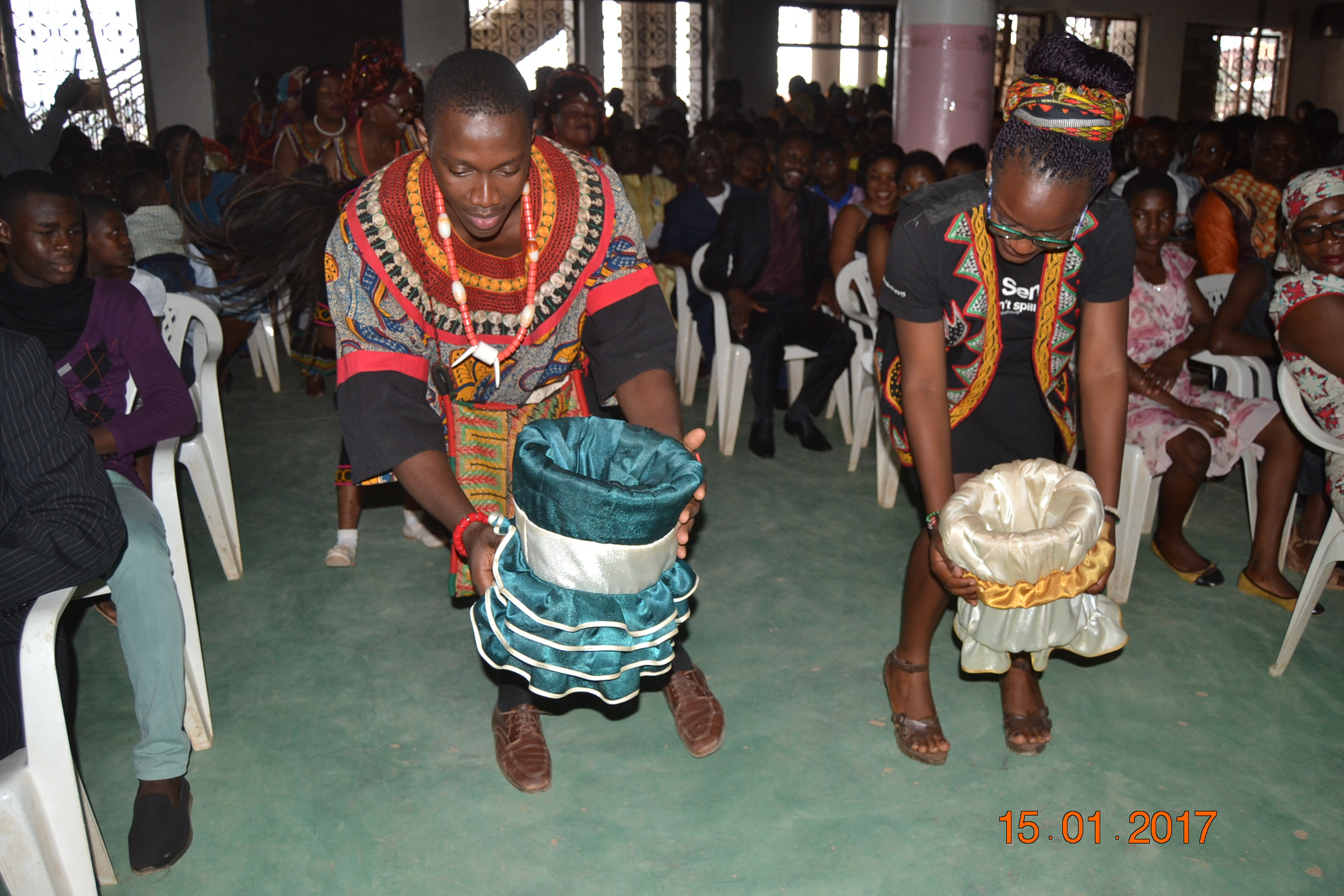

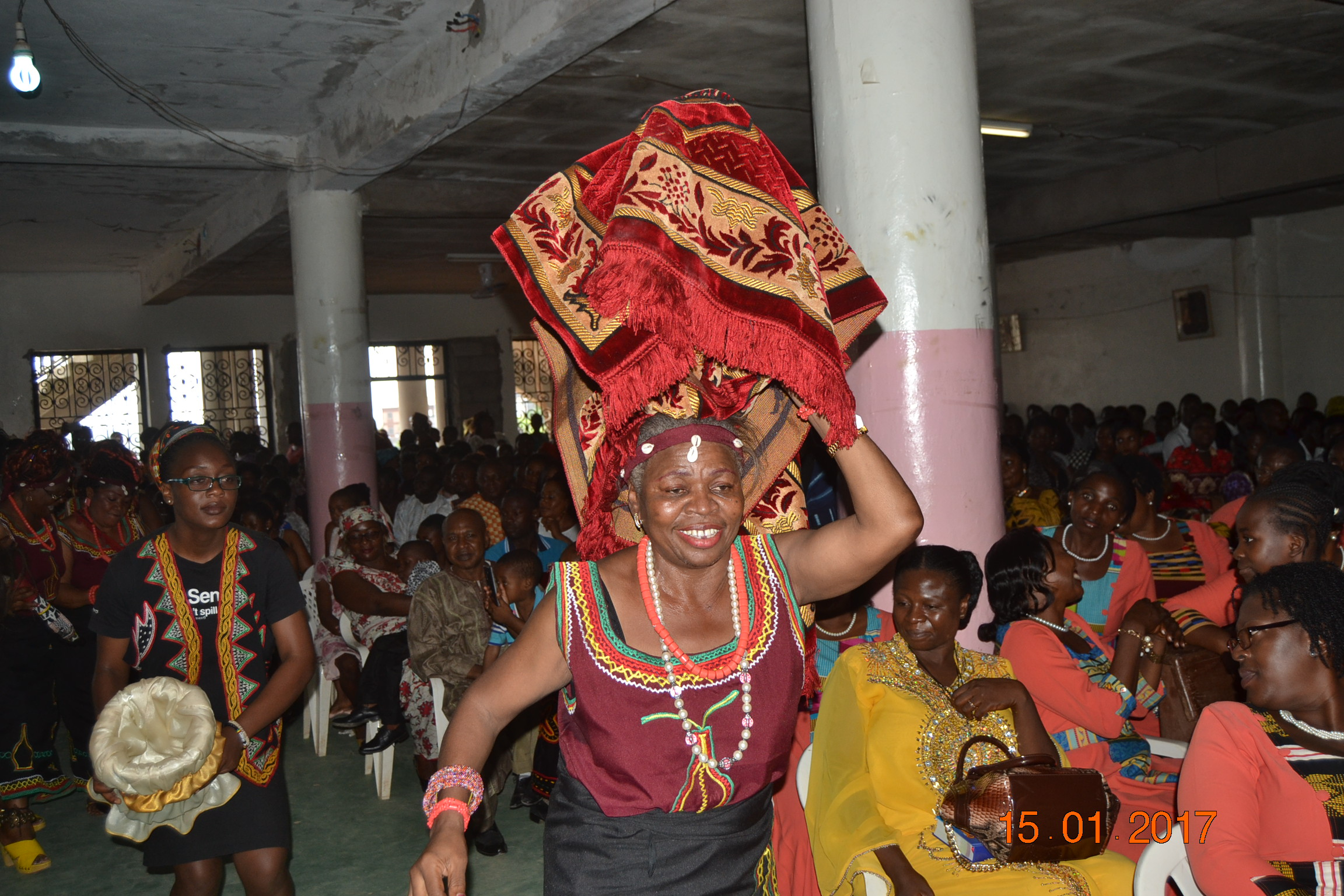
