= Han Taiwanese =

Ethnic group

Han Taiwanese 臺灣漢人
Total population
- c. 23 million

Languages
- Taiwanese Mandarin, Taiwanese Hokkien, Taiwanese Hakka, Kinmen Hokkien (Kinmen), Fuzhounese (Matsu), and Hinghwa (Wuqiu)

Religion
- Chinese folk religion; Taoism; Mahayana Buddhism; Christianity

Related ethnic groups
- Han people • Bai people • Hui people Austronesian Taiwanese

Han Taiwanese (Chinese: 臺灣漢人) or Taiwanese Han, also known as Taiwanese Han Chinese or Han Chinese Taiwanese, are Taiwanese people of full or partial ethnic Han Chinese ancestry. According to the Executive Yuan of Taiwan, they comprise 95 to 97 percent of the Taiwanese population, which also includes Austronesians and other non-Han people. Major waves of Han immigration occurred since the 17th century to the end of Chinese Civil War in 1949, with the exception of the Japanese colonial period (1895–1945). Han Taiwanese mainly speak three Sinitic languages: Mandarin, Hokkien and Hakka.

== Definition ==
There is no simple uniform definition of Han Taiwanese, which are estimated to comprise 95 to 98 percent of the Taiwanese population. To determine if a Taiwanese is Han, common criteria include immigration background (from continental East Asia), using a Chinese language as their mother tongue, and observance of traditional Han festivals. Sometimes a negative definition is employed, where Han people are those who are not non-Han.

Taiwanese Han ethnic groups include the Hoklo people and Hakka people that had arrived in Taiwan before World War II (sometimes called "benshengren"), as well those and other Han people that arrived shortly after World War II (Note: They also include some Minnan and Hakka people.) (sometimes called "waishengren"). The distinction between benshengren and waishengren is now less important due to intermarriages and the rise of a Taiwanese identity. In addition, there are Han that do not fall into the above categories, including the Puxian-speaking people in Wuqiu Township, Kinmen County, the Mindong-speaking people in Matsu, and various newly arrived Han immigrants.

Those who trace their ancestry to Quanzhou and Zhangzhou from Fujian make up 70% of Taiwan's population. 15% originate from Longyan and Meixian from Fujian and Guangdong respectively whilst 12% come from other provinces from mainland China. The rest are either Taiwanese aborigines, ethnic minorities from mainland China or foreign spouses.

=== Genetics ===
There is a belief that modern Taiwanese Han are genetically different from Chinese Han, which has been used as a basis for Taiwanese independence from China. This belief has been called the "myth of indigenous genes" by some researchers such as Shu-juo Chen and Hong-kuan Duan, who say that "genetic studies have never supported the idea that Taiwanese Han are genetically different with Chinese Han." Some descendants of plains aborigines have opposed the usage of their ancestors in the call for Taiwanese independence. Genetic studies show genetic differences between Taiwanese Han and mountain aborigines. According to Chen and Duan, the genetic ancestry of individuals cannot be traced with certainty and attempts to construct identity through genetics are "theoretically meaningless." In the highest self reports, 5.3 percent of Taiwan's population claimed indigenous heritage.

Estimates of indigenous ancestry range from 13%, 26%, and as high as 85%. The latter number was published in a Chinese language editorial and not a peer-reviewed scientific journal, however these numbers have taken hold in popular Taiwanese imagination and are treated as facts in Taiwanese politics and identity. Many Taiwanese claim to be part aboriginal. Some Taiwanese graduate biology students expressed skepticism at the findings, noting the lack of peer-reviewed publications. Chen suggests that the estimates resulted from manipulation of sample sizes. The lack of methodological rigor suggests the numbers were meant for local consumption. In all scientific studies, genetic markers for aboriginal ancestry make up a minute portion of the genome. In 2021, Marie Lin who was the source of the larger indigenous ancestry numbers, co-authored an article stating that the East Asian and Austronesian ancestors of the Taiwanese Han and indigenous peoples mixed during the southward migration of East Asians 4,000 years ago, although recent admixtures cannot be ruled out. However, only one in five hundred Han Taiwanese individuals examined was genetically closer to the Dusun people, who are closer to the Taiwanese indigenous peoples than Sino-Tibetan populations, and there are "distinct patterns of genetic structure between the Taiwanese Han and indigenous populations." Taiwanese Han also cluster with Cantonese and Chinese Singaporeans the most out of the Sino-Tibetan-speaking groups, supporting the hypothesis that the admixture event occurred prior to the migration of Taiwanese Han to Taiwan.

Other studies show genetic affinities between Taiwanese Han and Kinh Vietnamese and also, genetic input from western Indonesians and other Mainland Southeast Asians, reflecting ancient trade.

Related to the narrative of aboriginal ancestry is the idea that the vast majority of Han migrants to Taiwan were men who married indigenous women. This was due to prohibitions against families entering Taiwan during the Qing dynasty period that resulted in the idiom "has Tangshan (Note: Tangshan means "Chinese".) father, no Tangshan mother" (Chinese: 有唐山公，無唐山媽; Pe̍h-ōe-jī: Ū Tn̂g-soaⁿ kong, bô Tn̂g-soaⁿ má). However this narrative of widespread intermarriage between Han men and indigenous Taiwanese women is not supported by historical sources, which only report specific cases of intermarriage. The majority of Han men went back to the mainland to seek marriage, and the gender imbalance only lasted until the end of the early Qing period. Due to mass migration, within a few decades, the Han population vastly outnumbered the indigenous people so that even if intermarriage did happen, it would have been impossible to meet demand. The fact that indigenous tribes survived all the way up until Japanese colonization indicates that indigenous women did not marry with Han men en masse.

== Immigration history and demographics ==
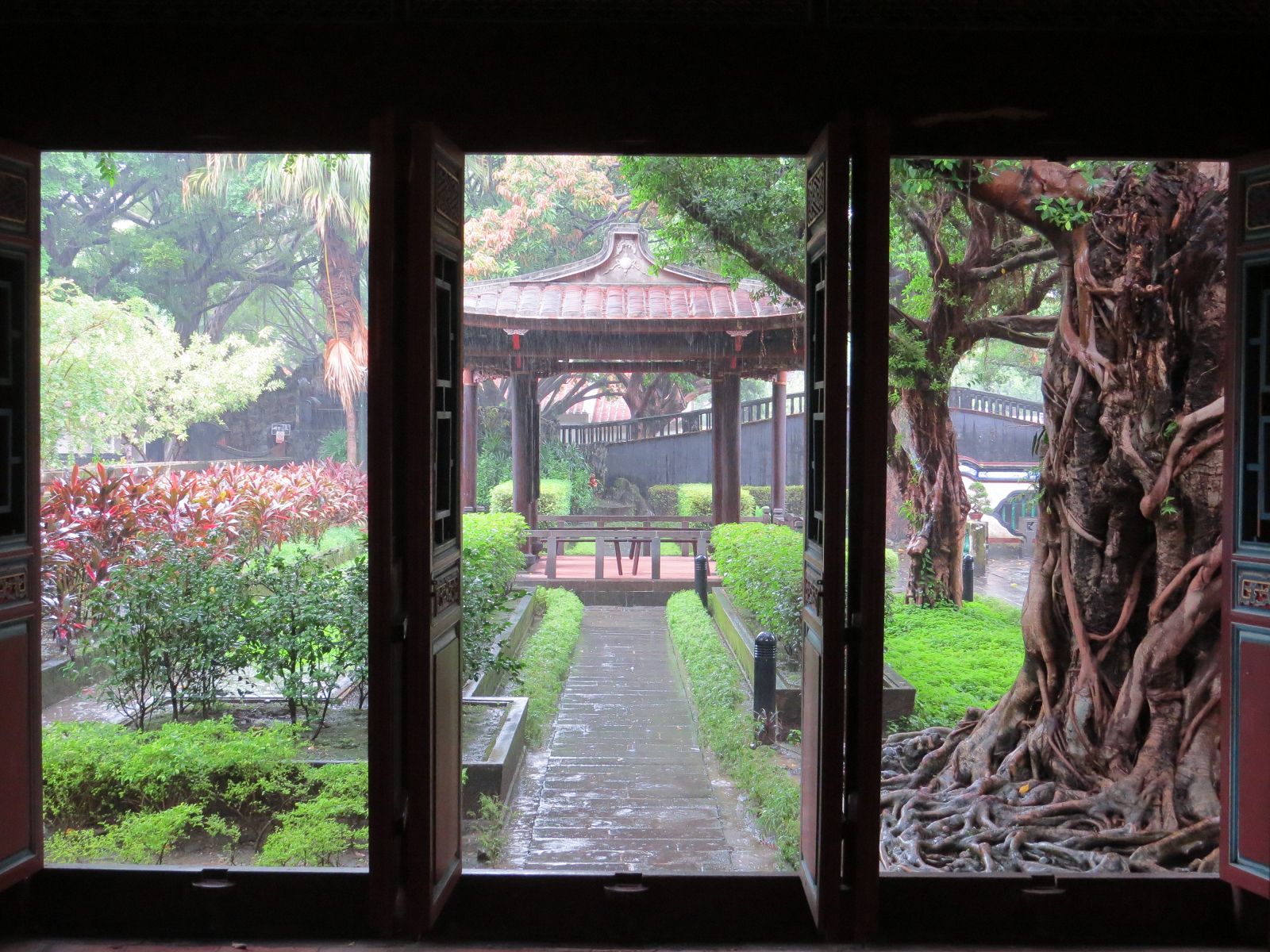
Lin Family Mansion and Garden, a traditional Han residence built in 1847. The ancestor of the Lin family came from Chang-chow, Hok-kien, Qing dynasty in 1778.

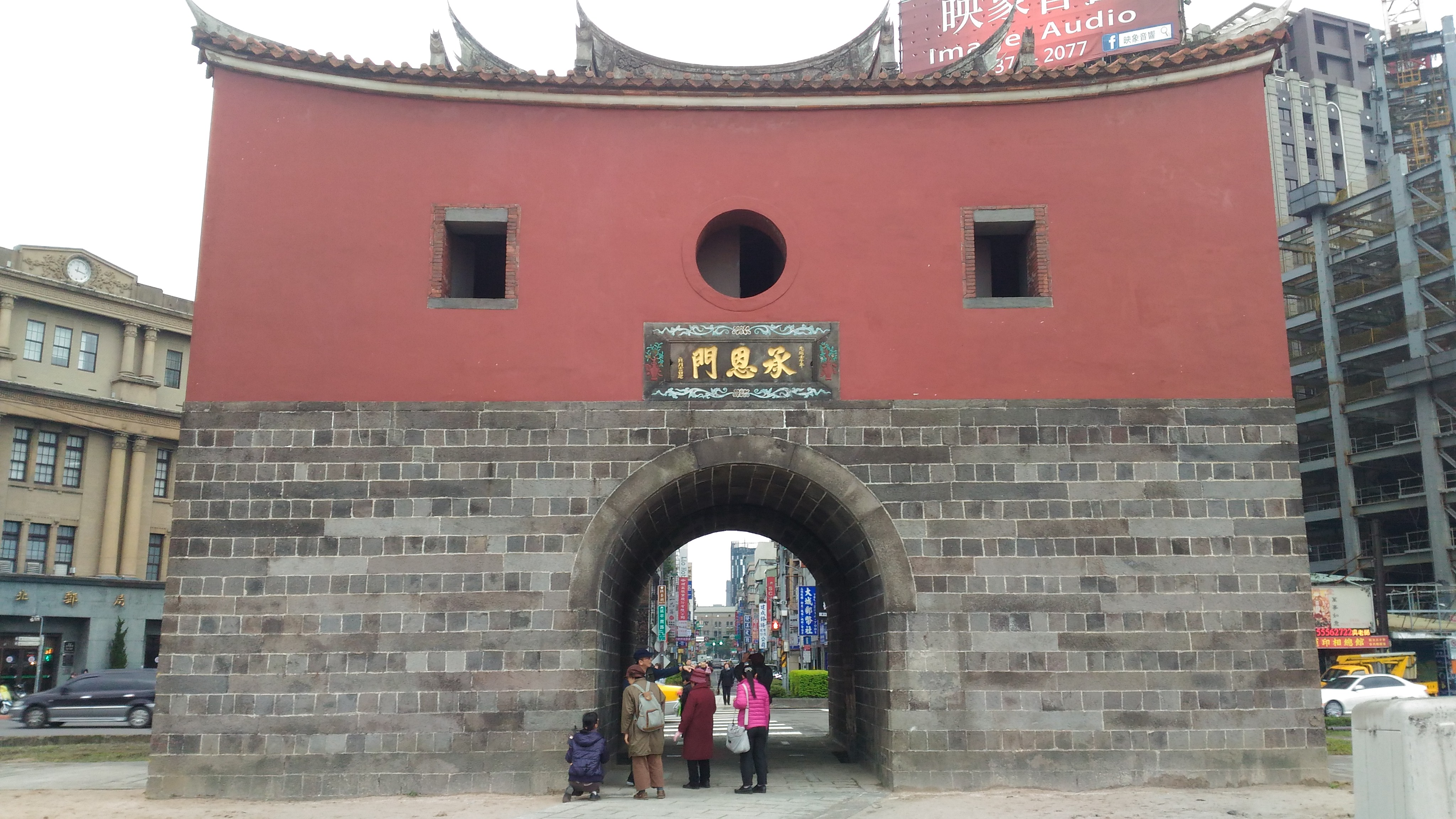
Taipei North Gate, a Minnan citadel gate built in 1884 during the Qing dynasty, now a national heritage of Taiwan

There were two major waves of Han immigration: 1) during the Qing dynasty in the 18th and 19th centuries and 2) from Republic of China's mainland area, which is now ruled by the People's Republic of China, in the final years of the Chinese Civil War (1945–1949).

=== Before Imperial Japanese rule ===
Taiwan's southwest was home to a Chinese population numbering close to 1,500 before the Dutch first came in 1623. From 1624 to 1662, they began to encourage large-scale Han immigration to the island for labour, mainly from what is today south Fujian.

Starting from 1683, the Qing government limited immigration to Taiwan. Such restriction was relaxed following the 1760s, and by 1811 there were more than two million ethnic Chinese in Taiwan. The 1926 census counted 3,116,400 and 586,300 Han people originating from the Hok-kien and Kwang-tung provinces (roughly Fujian and Guangdong today) during the Ming or Qing dynasty.

Demographics of Taiwan in 17th-20th centuries
Year	1684	1764	1782	1811	1840	1902	1926	1944	1956
Population	120,000	666,210	912,920	1,944,737	2,500,000	2,686,356	4,168,000 (Note: This number was inferred from the Han population size of 3,751,600 and their proportion of ≈90% in the total population.)	6,269,949	9,367,661

Regions of origin of Taiwanese Han people based on the 1926 census by the government of the Empire of Japan
Province	Fujian									Guangdong			Others
County (州/府)	Quanzhou			Zhangzhou	Tingzhou	Longyan	Fuzhou	Hinghwa	Yung-chun	Teochew	Chia-ying	Hui-chou	Others
District	An-hsi	Tung-an	San-yi	Zhangzhou	Tingzhou	Longyan	Fuzhou	Hinghwa	Yung-chun	Teochew	Chia-ying	Hui-chou	Others
Language (dialect)	Minnan/Hokkien (Quanzhou)			Minnan/Hokkien (Zhangzhou, including eastern Zhao'an) / Hakka (western Zhaoan)	Hakka (Yongding, Changting)	Minnan (urban Longyan city), Hakka (rural Yongding)	Mindong (Foochow)	Hinghwa	Minnan/Hokkien (Quanzhou)	Minnan(Teo-chew), Hakka (Raoping, Dapu)	Hakka (Sixian, Wuhua)	Hakka (Hailu)	various languages
Inhabitants (thousands)	441.6	553.1	686.7	1,319.5	42.5	16	27.2	9.3	20.5	134.8	296.9	154.6	48.9

=== After World War II ===
Around 800,000 people, the vast majority being Han, immigrated to Taiwan after the end of the World War II, when Republic of China took over Taiwan, with the biggest wave taking place around the founding of the People's Republic of China (PRC) on the mainland in 1949. Since the mid-1990s, there has been a small amount of Han immigration from the PRC into Taiwan. It mainly consists of two categories—brides of businessmen who work on the mainland, and women who have married rural Taiwanese, mostly through a marriage broker.

Around 20% or 34,000 of the Vietnamese people in Taiwan are Hoa people, people of Chinese origin that are mostly Han.

== Interactions among Han immigrants ==
=== Qing dynasty ===
==== Conflicts ====
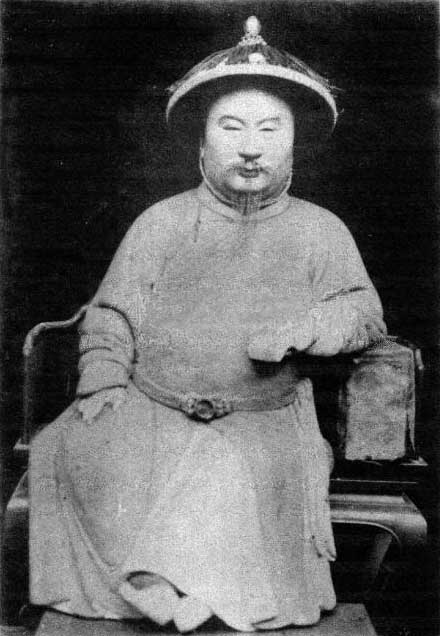
Tēⁿ Iōng-sek (鄭用錫), a Hoklo Taiwanese and author of On Reconciliation (Source of Photo: 台灣文化誌 by Kanori Ino).

There were violent ethnic conflicts (termed "分類械鬥" in government documents of the Qing dynasty), which played a major role in determining the distribution of different groups of Han people in Taiwan. Most conflicts were between people of Zhangzhou and Quanzhou origins which includes acts where Quanzhang fought against Hakka peasants from the southwestern hills of Fujian (Tingzhou and western Zhangzhou) throughout the period. ("漳泉械鬥", Chang-Chin conflicts) and between people of Hokkien and Hakkas origins ("閩粵械鬥" [Min-Yue conflicts]) where Hoklo people united to fight against the Hakka who largely came from Guangdong and a minority from Fujian, is called ("閩客械鬥" [Min-Hakka conflicts]).

Trying to be a mediator, Tēⁿ Iōng-sek (鄭用錫, 10 June 1788 – 21 March 1858), the first Taiwanese to achieve the highest degree, jinshi or "Doctor" (Mandarin: 進士), in the imperial examination of the Qing dynasty, wrote an article On Reconciliation (勸和論).

==== Cultural assimilation ====
In some regions, where the majority of the population spoke another language, the minority group sometimes adopted the more dominant language and lost their original language. This most commonly occurred with Hakka migrants, who adopted either Quanzhou or Zhangzhou Hokkien; they are referred to as "minnanized" Hakka people (福佬客).

=== Republic of China ===
Unlike pre-World War II, when Han immigrants were predominantly of Hok-kien and Hakka origins, post-World War II Han people came from all over mainland China. Their different languages, habits, ideologies and relationships with the Republic of China government sometimes led to conflicts between these two groups.

== Interactions with non-Han inhabitants ==
In Taiwan, the Han people came into contact with the Austronesians, Dutch, Spanish and Japanese.

=== Han people and Austronesians ===
The Amis term for Han people is payrag.

According to the historian Melissa J. Brown, within the Taiwanese Minnan (Hoklo) community itself, differences in culture indicate the degree to which mixture with Austronesians took place, with most pure Hoklo Han in Northern Taiwan having almost no Austronesian admixture, which is limited to Hoklo Han in Southern Taiwan. Plains aborigines who were mixed and assimilated into the Hoklo Han population at different stages were differentiated between "short-route" and "long-route". The ethnic identity of assimilated Plains aboriginals in the immediate vicinity of Tainan was still known since a Taiwanese girl from an old elite Hoklo family was warned by her mother to stay away from them. The insulting name "番仔" (huan-a) was used against plains aborigines by the Taiwanese, and the Hoklo Taiwanese speech was forced upon Aborigines like the Pazeh people. Hoklo Taiwanese has replaced Pazeh and driven it to near extinction. Aboriginal status has been requested by plains aboriginals.

== Biological traits and relationships with other Taiwanese/Asian people ==
=== Genetic relationships ===
Part of the maximum-likelihood tree of 75 Asian populations:

- - - - - - - - - Japanese/Ryukyuan
                - Korean
              - Han (Beijing)
            - Han (Shanghai)
          - Hoklo Han Taiwanese
        - Hakka Han Taiwanese
      - Han Singaporean (Minnan/Hokkien speaker)
    - Han (Guangdong)
  - Hmong/Yao

=== Alcohol metabolism ===
In Taiwan, the prevalence of alcohol dependence among the Han is 10 times lower than that of Austronesians, which is related to genetic, physical, psychological, social, environmental, and cultural factors. An association study by researchers at the Academia Sinica found that genes in alcohol metabolism pathway, especially ADH1B and ALDH2, conferred the major genetic risk for alcohol dependence in Taiwanese Han men.

== Languages ==
Most commonly used languages in Taiwan, showing the difference in percentage between the most commonly and the second most commonly used language at home for each township/district. cmn: Taiwanese Mandarin; nan: Taiwanese Hokkien; hak: Taiwanese Hakka; map: Taiwanese Austronesian languages.

The languages used by Han Taiwanese include Mandarin (entire country), Hokkien (Taiwan proper and Kinmen), Hakka (Taiwan proper), Mindong (Matzu), Puxian (Wuqiu Island, Kinmen), and other Han languages spoken by some post-World War II immigrants or immigrants from mainland China since the 1990s. The writing systems used include Han characters, Han phonetic notations such as Mandarin Phonetic Symbols for Mandarin and Taiwanese Phonetic Symbols for Hokkien and Hakka, and the Latin alphabet for various romanization systems, including Tongyong Pinyin, Wade–Giles, Gwoyeu Romatzyh and Mandarin Phonetic Symbols II for Mandarin, POJ and Taiwanese Minnan Romanization System for Hokkien, and Hakka Romanization System for Hakka.

Significant numbers of Puxian Min, Fuzhounese, and Teochew speakers came to Taiwan proper, but they were eventually assimilated into the Hokkien (Minnan) speaking population.

=== Linguistic diversity ===
Taiwanese linguist Uijin Ang divided Taiwan (excluding Kinmen and Matsu) into 7 linguistic regions, including one Austronesian, five Han and one mixed.

Han linguistic regions of Taiwan according to Ang (2013)
Region	Languages included	Administrative regions included
Hakka speaking region	major: Hakka (Sixian, Hailu, Dapu) minor: Hokkien (Zhangzhou)	Taoyuan, Hsinchu County, Miaoli County, Taichung, Nantou County, Kaohsiung, Pingtung County
Northern Taiwan	Hokkien (Zhangzhou, Quanzhang)	New Taipei, Taipei, Ilan County, Keelung, Taoyuan
Central Taiwan	major: Hokkien (coastal: Quanzhang; inland: Zhangzhou) minor: Hakka (Zhaoan, Hailu), Tsou	Hsinchu County (coastal), Miaoli County (coastal), Taichung, Changhua County, Yunlin County, Nantou County
Southern Taiwan	major: Hokkien (mixed, Quanzhang, Zhangzhou) minor: Hakka (Sixian, Hailu)	Chiayi County, Chiayi City, Tainan, Kaohsiung, Pingtung County
Penghu	Hokkien (Quanzhang, Zhangzhou, mixed)	Penghu

=== Influence of Non-Han languages ===
Ever since the arrival of Han immigrants in Taiwan, their languages have undergone changes through interactions with other Han or non-Han languages. For example, one unit of land area used in Taiwanese Minnan is Kah (甲; 0.9699 acre), which comes from the Dutch word for "field", akker (akker > 阿甲 > 甲).

Loanwords in Taiwanese Hakka
Source languages	Han characters	Romanization	Meaning
Austronesian languages	馬不老	ma pu lao	drunk
Dutch	石文	sak vun	soap
Hokkien	米粉炒	bi hun tsha	fried rice vermicelli
Japanese	幫浦	phong phu	pump
Mandarin	再見	tsai kian	goodbye

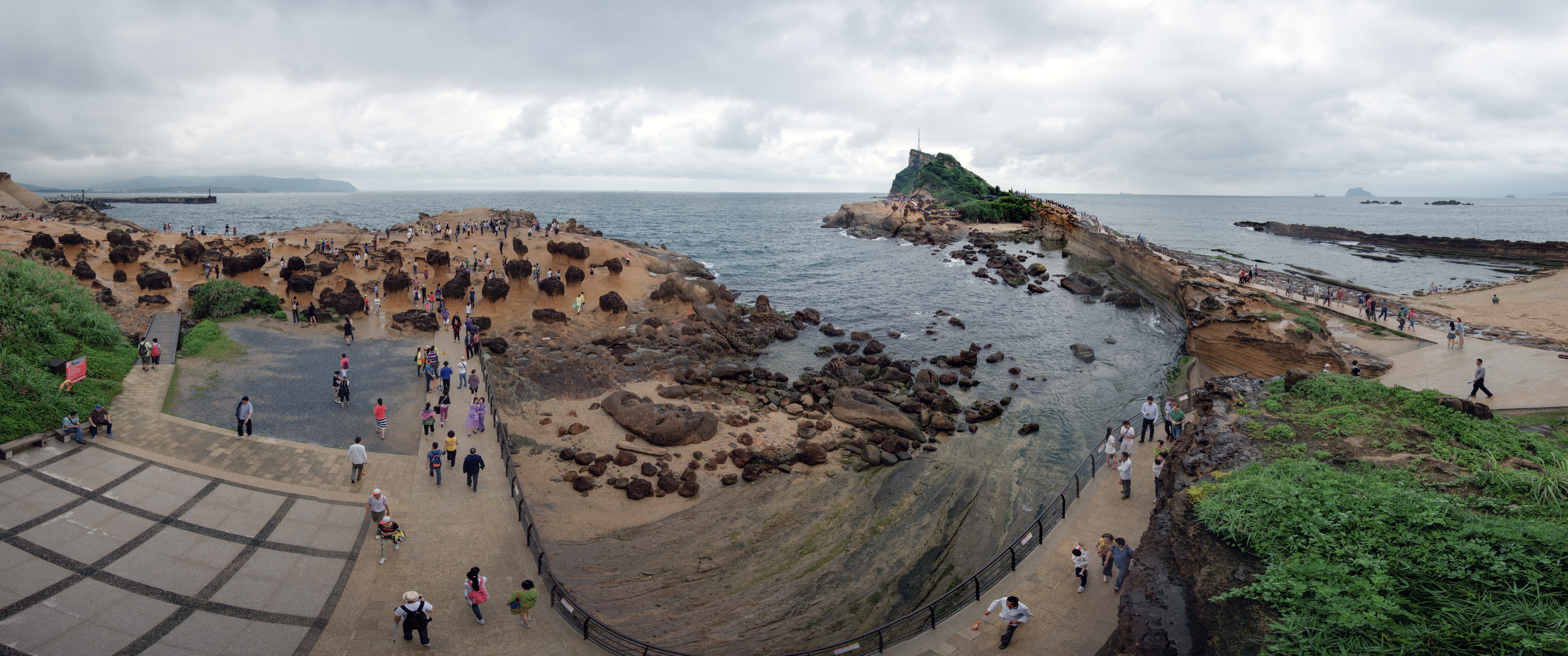
Yehliu (野柳, Iá-Liú in Minnan), a scenic area in northern Taiwan. Its name came from the Castilian name given by the Spaniards, Punto Diablos, which means 'Cape Devils'.

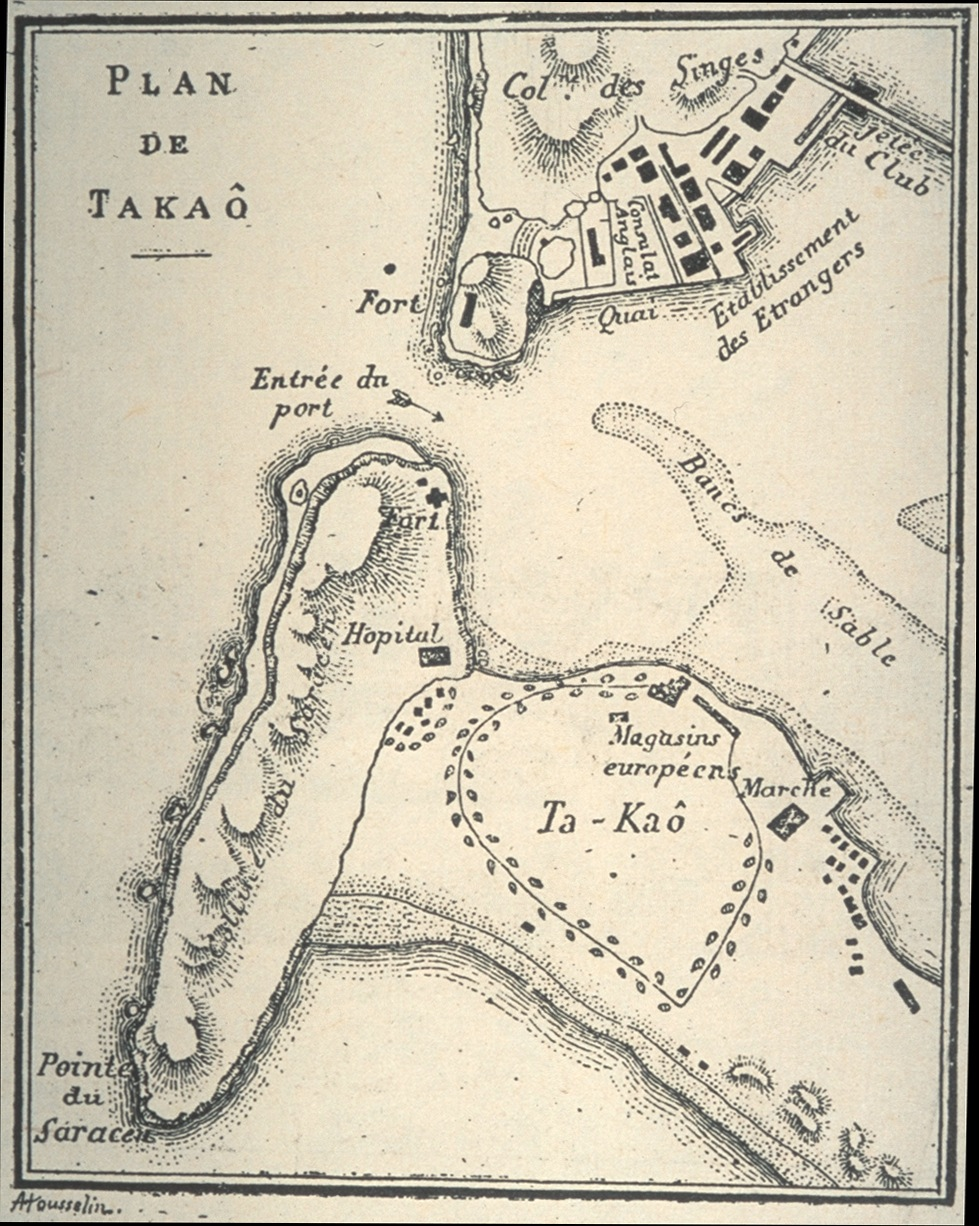
Takau/Takao is the old name of Kaohsiung.

Loanwords for place names in Taiwanese Han languages
Source languages	Place	Han characters	Notes
Dutch	Fort Zeelandia	熱蘭遮城	
Dutch	Cape Hoek	富貴角	Dutch: hoek ('cape')
Castilian	Cape San Diego	三貂角	Castilian: Santiago; Dutch: St. Jago
Castilian	Yehliu	野柳	[Punto] Diablos (Castilian) > 野柳 (Hokkien)
Atayal	Wulai	烏來	Atayal: ulay ('hot spring')
Basay	Jinshan	金山	Kimpauri/Kimauri > 金包里 (Minnan) > 金山 (Japanese)
Japanese	Kaohsiung	高雄	Takau (Makatto) > 打狗 (Hokkien) > 高雄/たかお/Taka-O (Japanese)
Japanese	Songshan	松山	松山/まつやま/Matsu-Yama (Japanese)
Japanese	Guansi	關西	鹹菜 (Ham-Coi) 甕 (Hakka) > 鹹菜/かんさい/Kan-Sai (Japanese) > 關西/かんさい/Kan-Sai (Japanese)

== Culture ==
=== Cuisine ===
Some typical foods of Han Taiwanese
Subgroup	Food
Hoklo	滷肉飯 (minced pork rice), 割包 (Gua-bao), 蚵仔煎 (oyster omelet), 豬血糕 (rice blood cake)
Hakka	客家小炒 (fried pork, dried tofu and squid), 薑絲大腸 (Large intestine with ginger slices), 粄條 (flat rice noodles)
Waishengren	牛肉麵 (Beef noodle soup), 燒餅 (clay oven rolls), 油條 (deep fried stick), 臭豆腐 (stinky tofu)

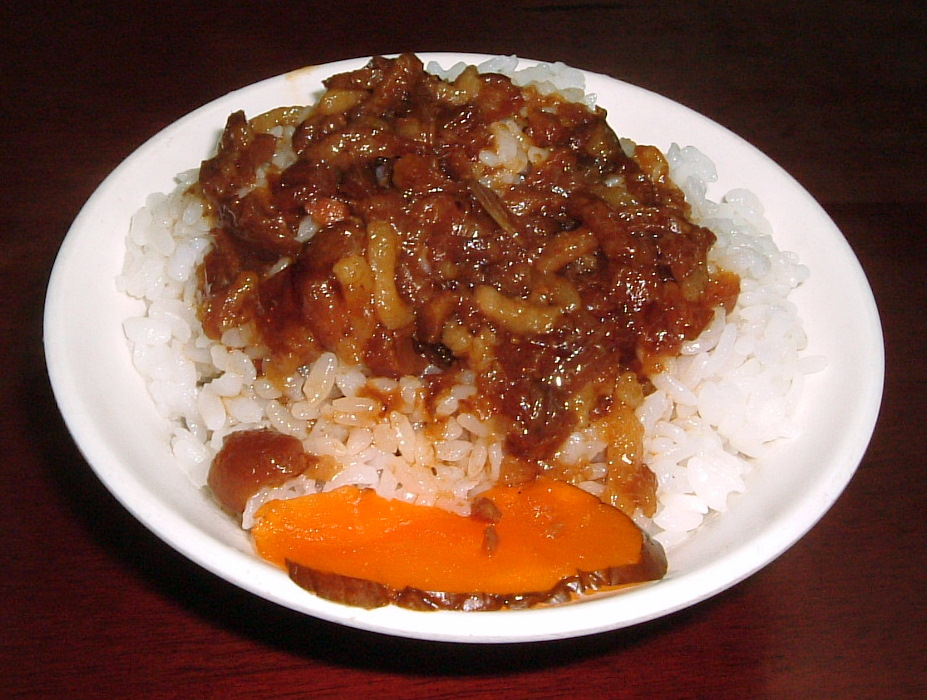
Minced pork rice, a rice dish of Han Taiwanese.

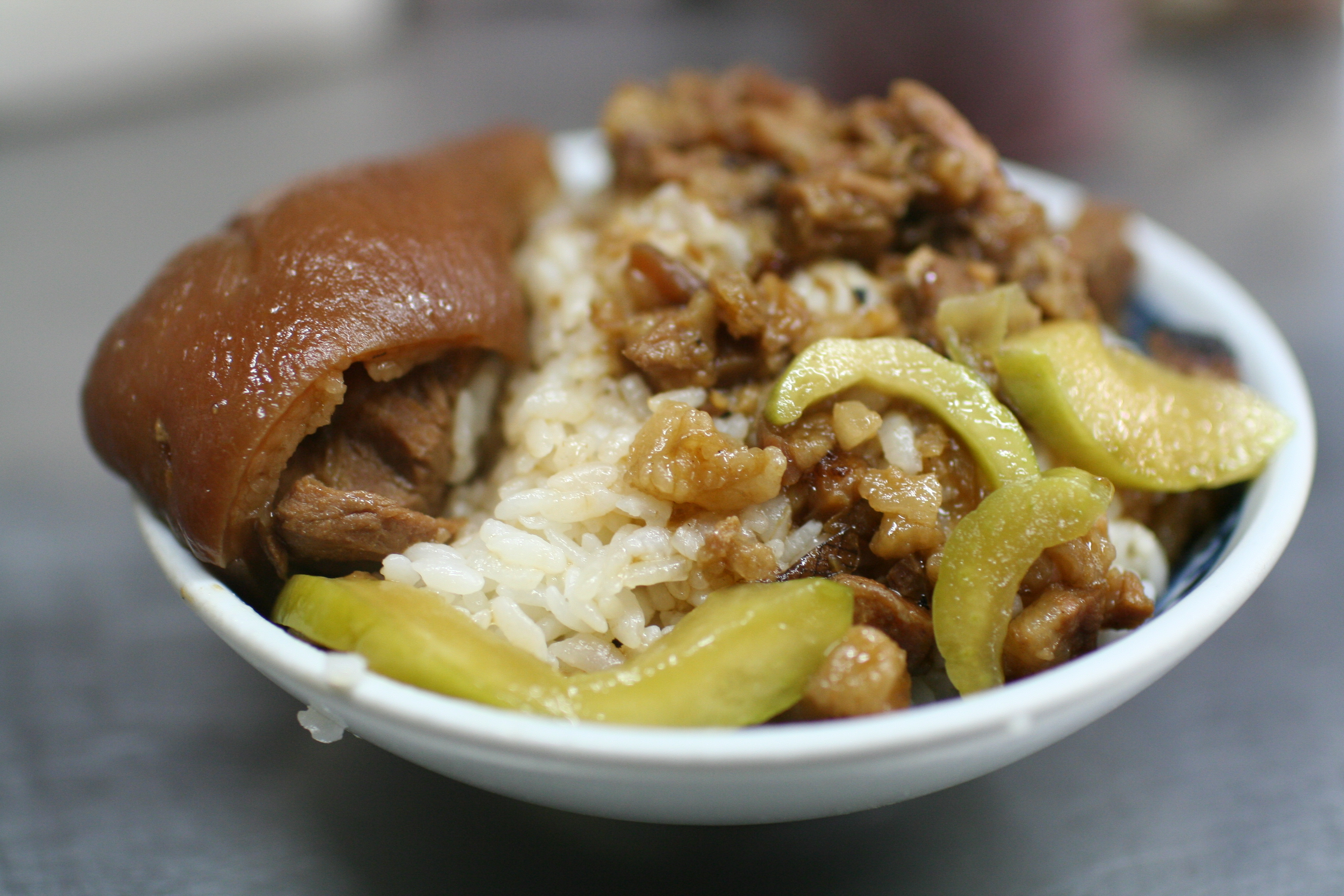
Minced pork rice in Taichung.

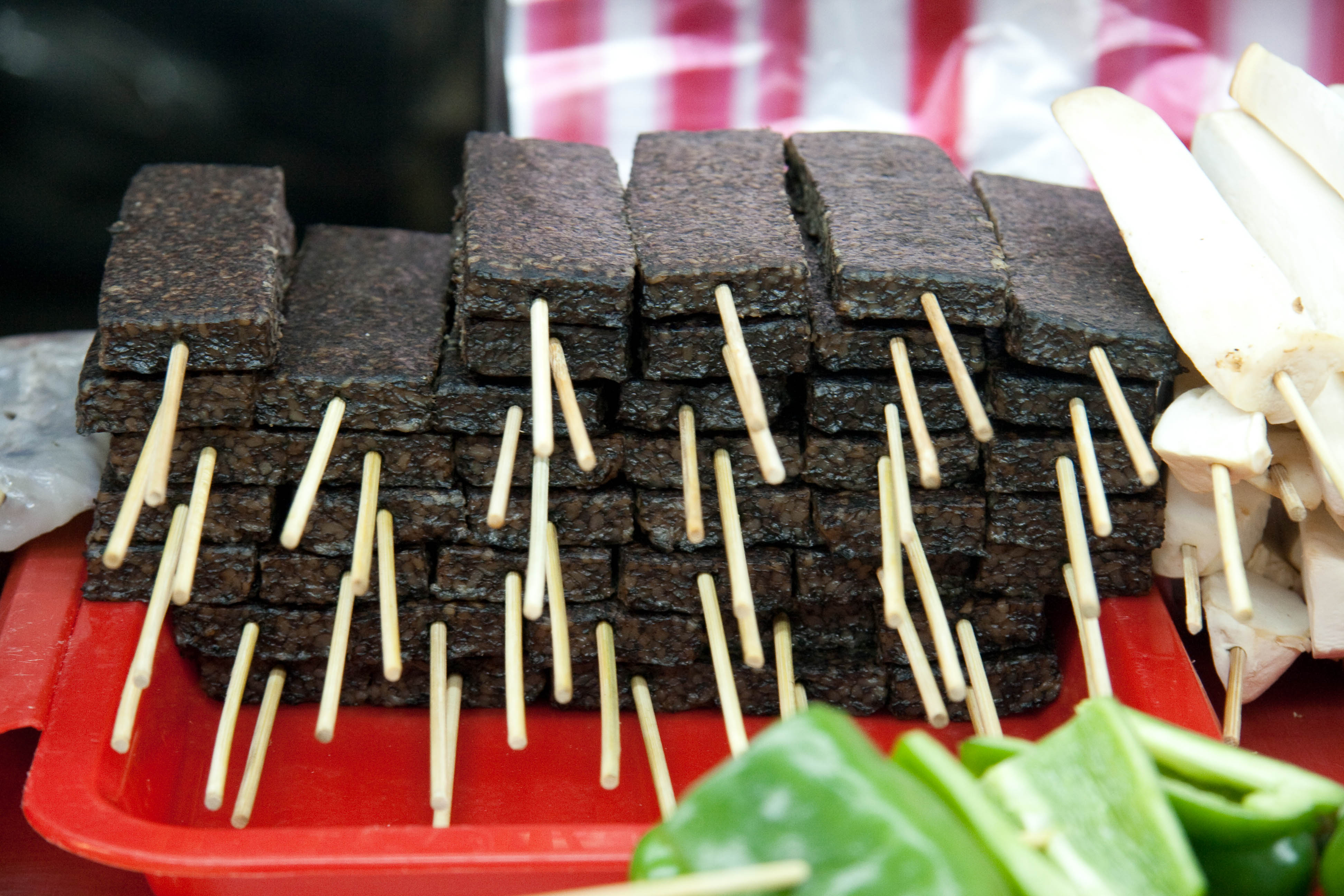
Rice blood cakes to be fried.

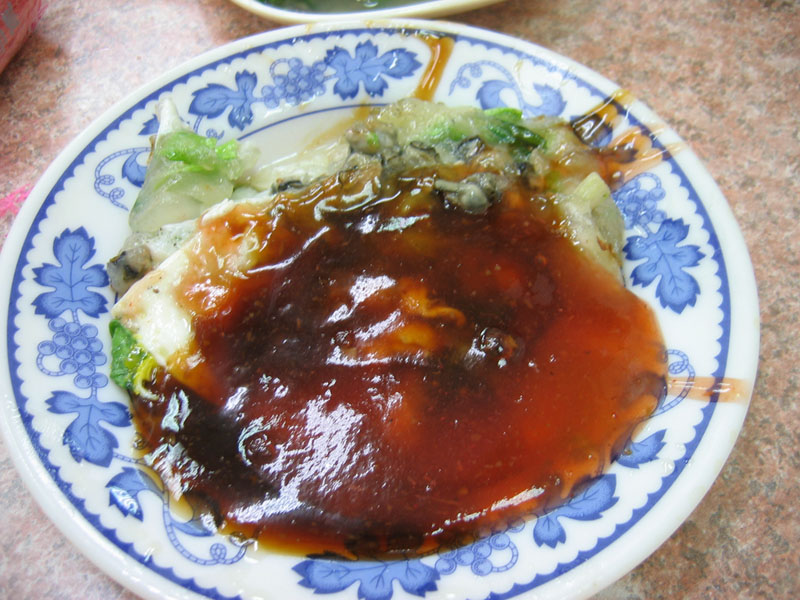
Oyster omelet in Lugang, Changhua.

=== Religion ===
The most popular religions of Han Taiwanese are Taoism and Buddhism. With 11,796 temples (78.4% Taoist; 19.6% Buddhist), Taiwan is the country with the highest density of temples in the world.

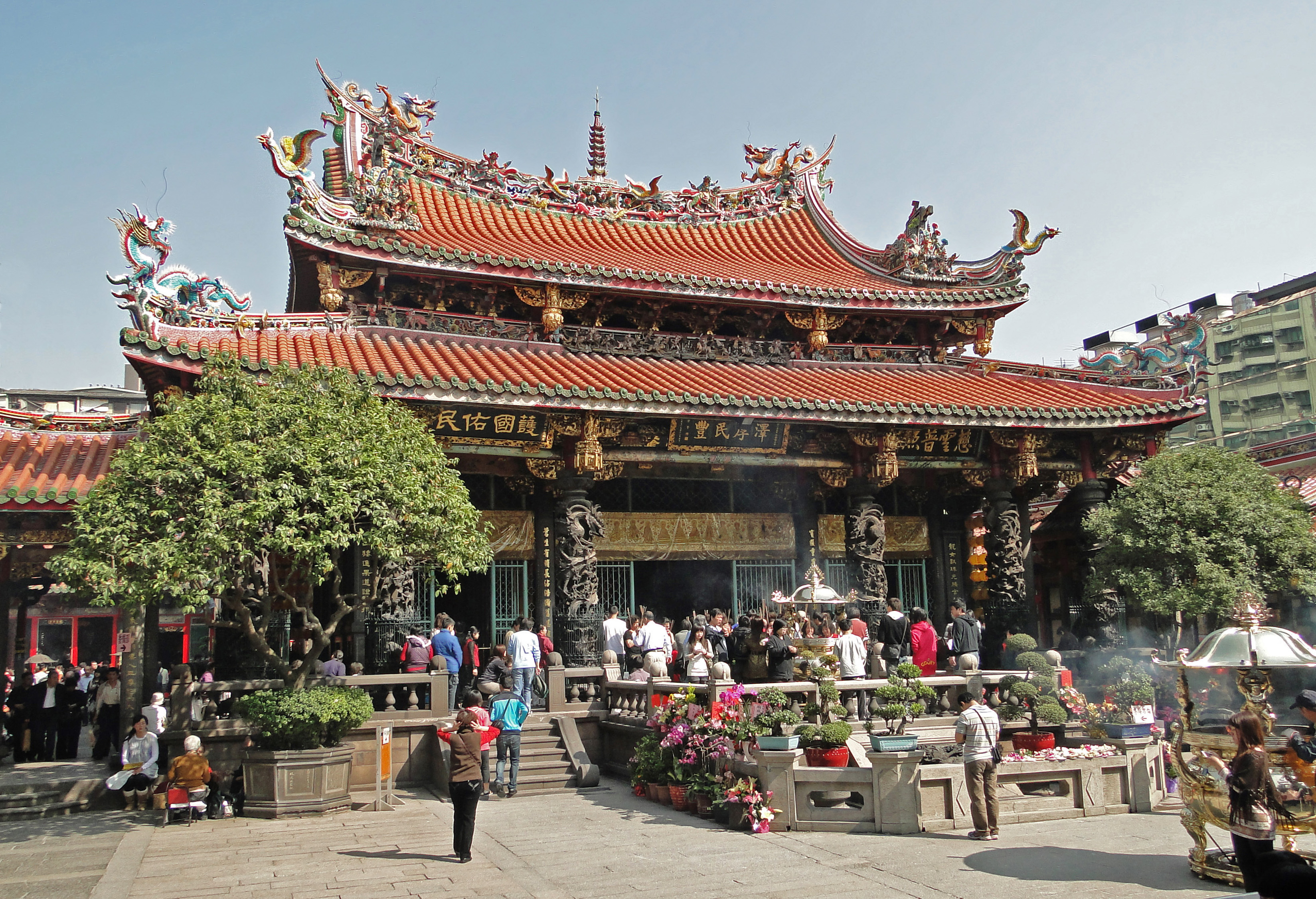
Lungshan Temple, a Taoist-Buddhist temple in Taipei.

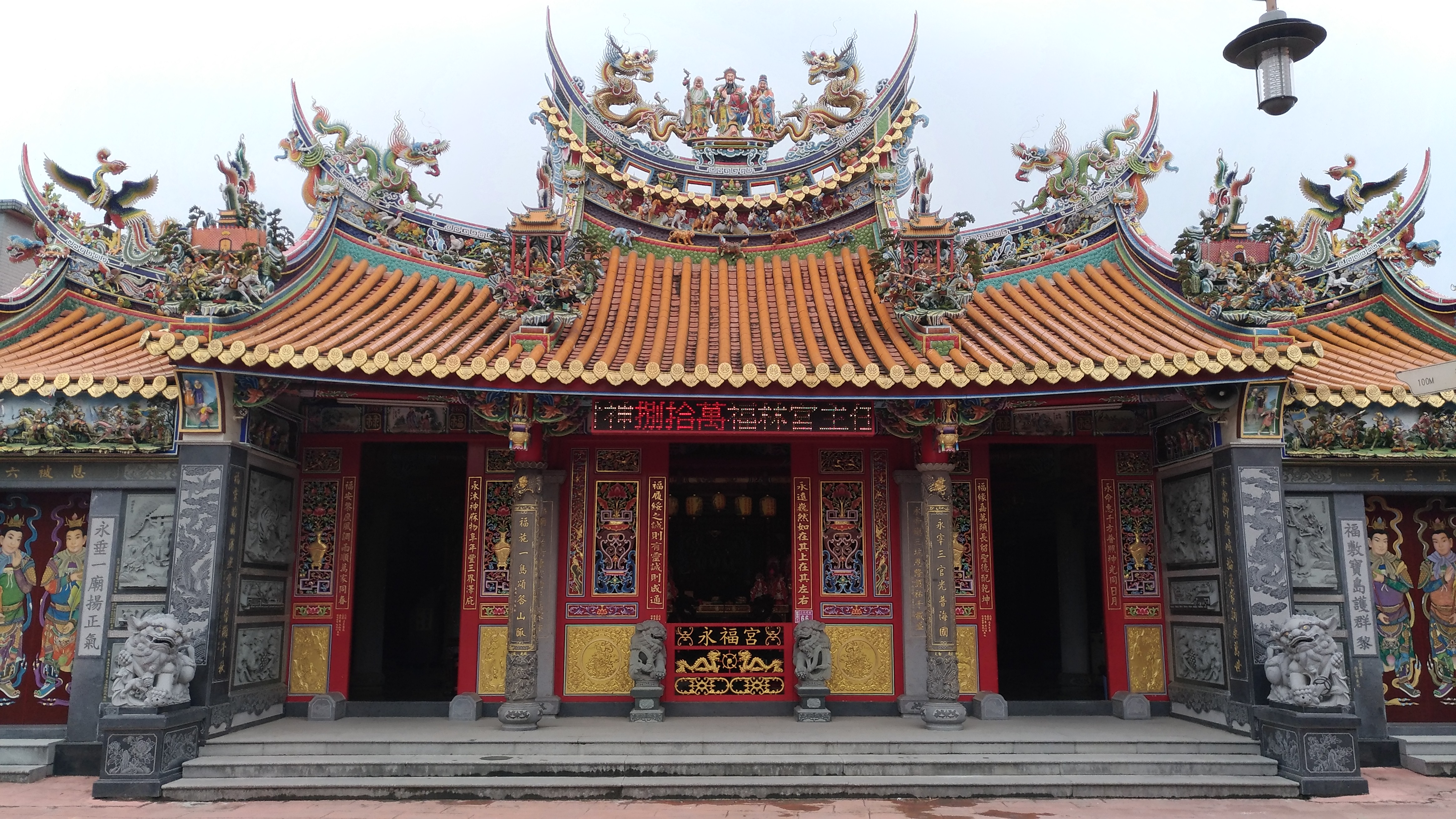
Iun-Fug Giung (永福宮), Longtan District, Taoyuan, is a traditional Han temple built in 1791 in the Hakka village Sam-Hang-Zii

=== Surnames ===
==== Han surnames in Taiwan ====
The ten most common Han surnames in Taiwan in 2014 (Note: Numbers including all nationals who have a Han name, including many Austronesians, who were until 1990s forbidden to possess their traditional names. See Taiwanese aborigines.)
Han Surname	Wade–Giles	Pinyin	Population	Percentage
陳	Ch῾en	Chen	2,605,191	11.14%
林	Lin	Lin	1,942,787	8.31%
黃	Huang	Huang	1,413,270	6.04%
張	Chang	Zhang	1,234,180	5.28%
李	Li	Li	1,200,862	5.13%
王	Wang	Wang	961,744	4.11%
吳	Wu	Wu	944,949	4.04%
劉	Liu	Liu	738,976	3.16%
蔡	Ts῾ai	Cai	681,012	2.91%
楊	Yang	Yang	621,832	2.66%

In traditional Han society, children inherit the surname of the father. Population analyses of Han Taiwanese based on the short tandem repeat sequences on the Y chromosome, which is specific to males, shows high haplotype diversity in most surname groups. Except for rare ones, the origins of Han surnames in Taiwan are pretty heterogeneous.

=== Villages ===
Confucian temples formed an important part of the life of early Han immigrants. Famous temples include Taiwan Confucian Temple and Taipei Confucius Temple.

=== Written Records/Literature ===
One of the earliest written records of Taiwanese Hakka is A Tragic Ballad about Hakka Sailing to Taiwan (渡台悲歌), a work written in the Raoping dialect about the life and struggle of Hakka immigrants to Taiwan under the Ching rule.

=== Folk literature: Tales and Legends ===
One of the best known Han folktales in Taiwan is the Aunt Tiger.

=== Architecture ===
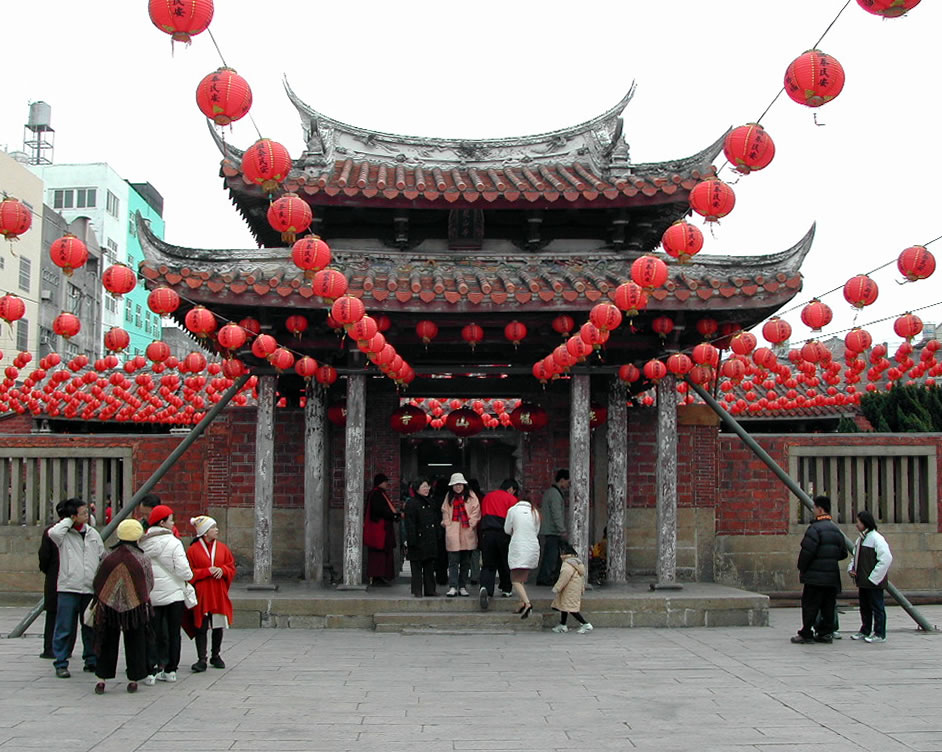
Traditional Minnan (Hokkien) architecture styled Lukang Longshan Temple.

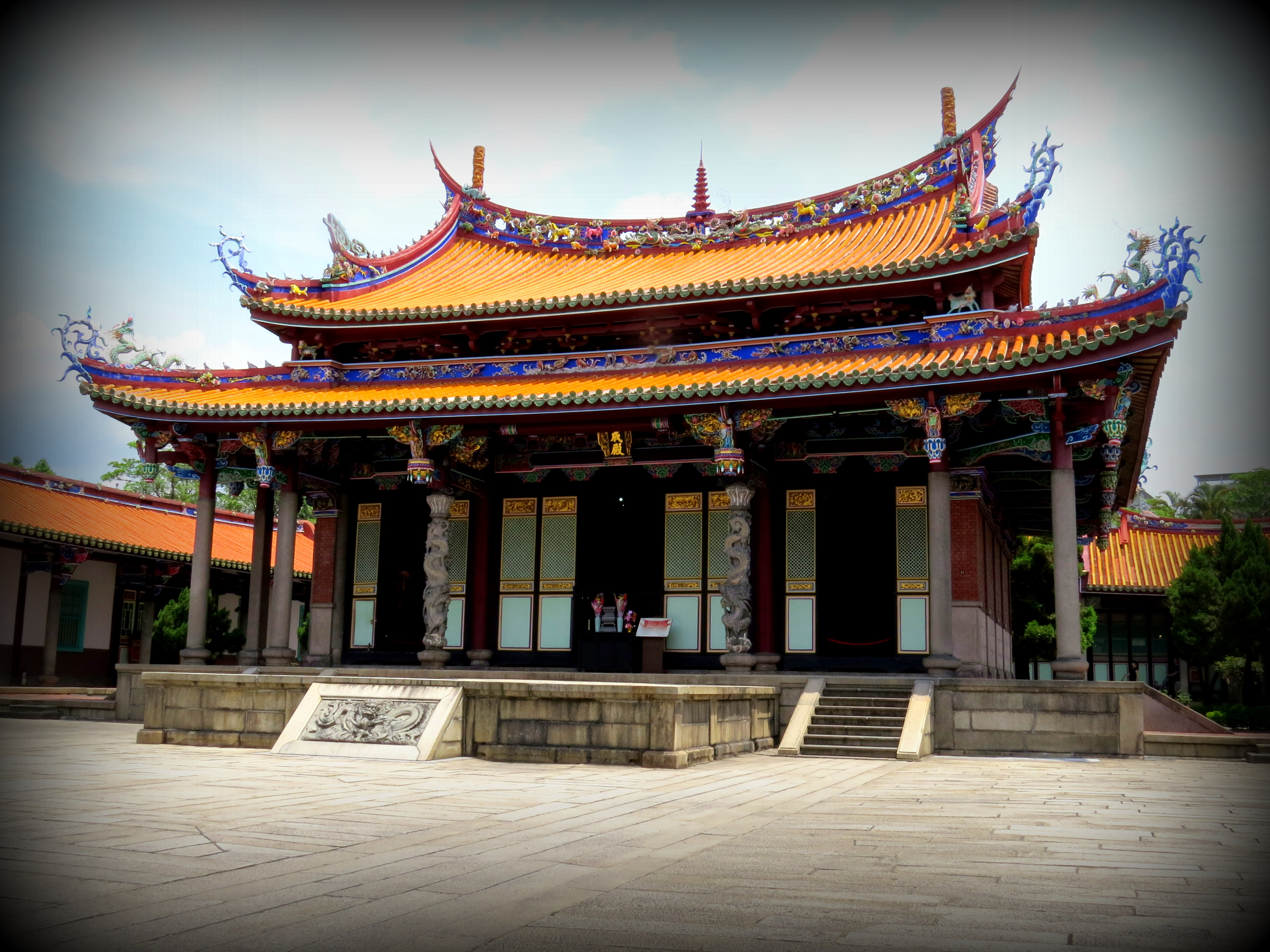
Taipei Confucius Temple

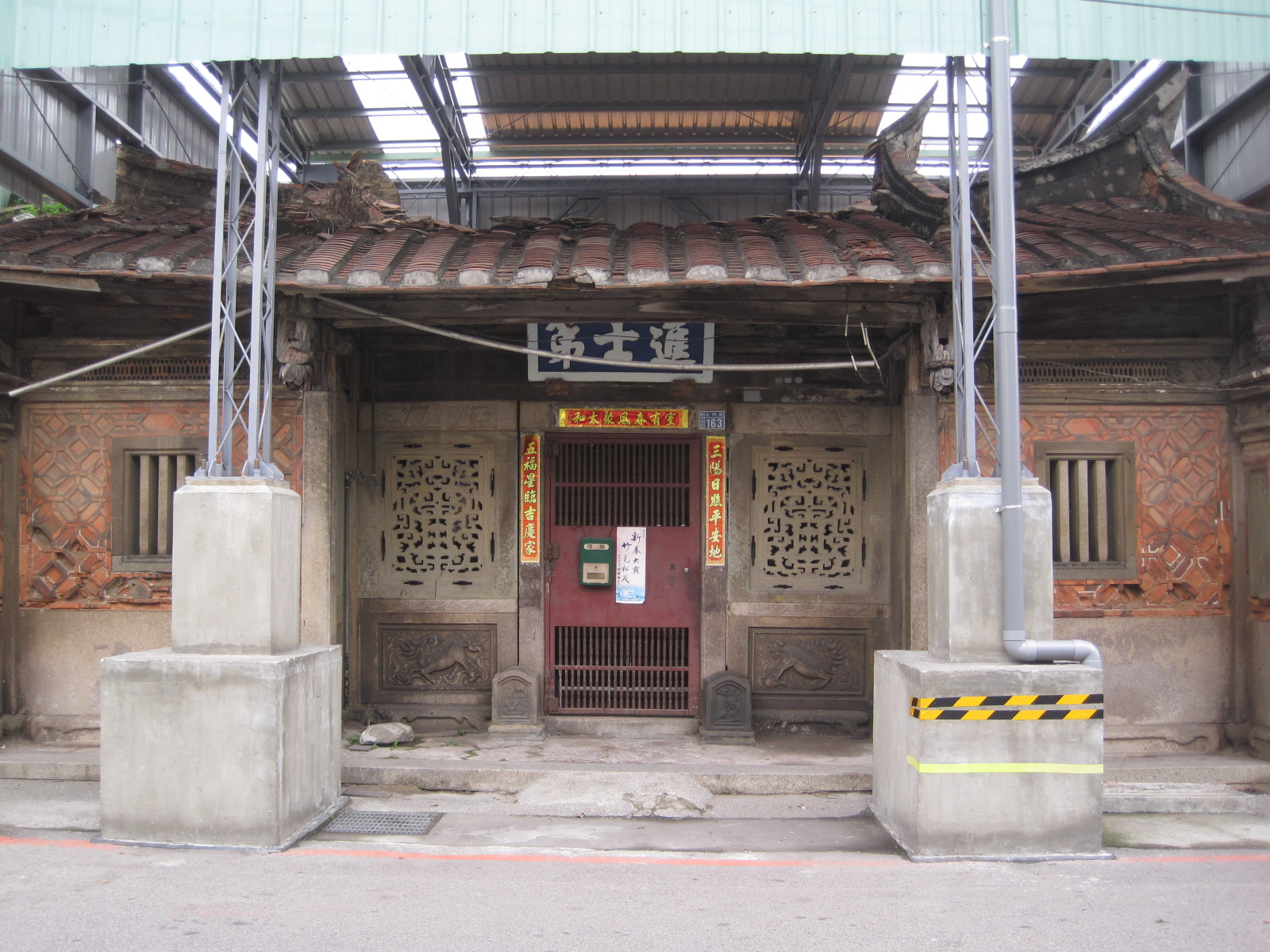
House of Tēⁿ Iōng-sek (鄭用錫), a Minnan Taiwanese building and a national monument of Taiwan.

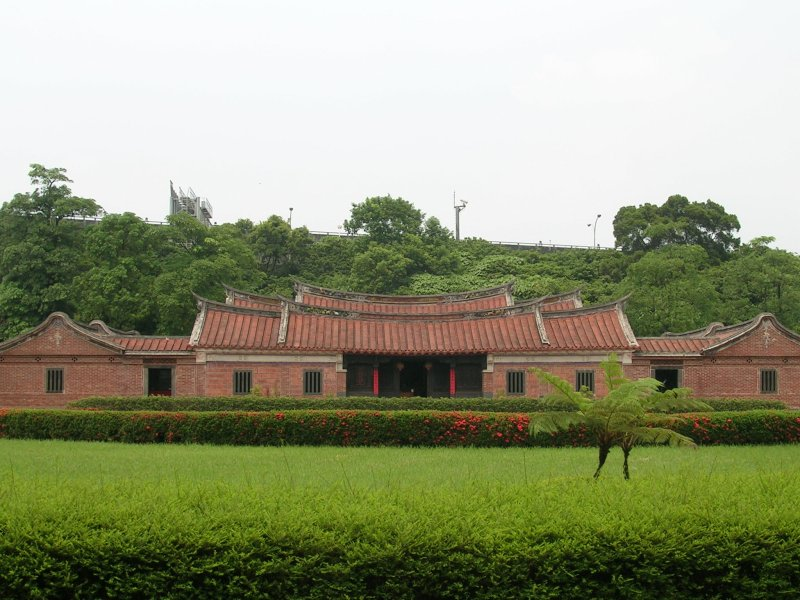
Lin An Tai Historical House and Museum, a Minnan-style courtyard.

Taiwanese architecture refers to a style of buildings constructed by the Han people, and is a branch of Chinese architecture. The style is generally afforded to buildings constructed before the modernization under Japanese occupation, in the 1930s. Different groups of Han immigrants differ in their styles of architecture. Being far away from the center of political power of Beijing, buildings were constructed free of construction standards. This, coupled with inferior level of expertise of artisans and craftsmen, and the Japanese colonization, the architectural style diverged from the ones on the mainland. Many traditional houses have been designated national monuments by the Taiwanese government, such as the Lin Family Mansion and Garden and the House of Tēⁿ Iōng-sek (鄭用錫).

=== Handicrafts ===
Hakka Taiwanese have long traditions of indigo dyeing.

The Yilan International Children's Folklore and Folkgame Festival exhibits collections of traditional Han Taiwanese toys.

=== Arts and Music ===
Folk songs of Han Taiwanese
Subgroup	Notable examples	Notable places	Notable singers/composers
Minnan (Hoklo)	Clinking Coins (丟丟銅仔)	Yilan	
Minnan (Hoklo)	思想起 (Su Siang Ki)	Hengchun	Chen Da
Minnan (Hoklo)	望春風 (Bāng Chhun-hong)		Teng Yu-hsien
Hakka	十八摸 (Eighteen Touches)		

== See also ==
- Han Taiwanese nationalism
