= Hakka Chinese =

Sinitic language originating in southern China

Hakka
- 客家话; Hak-kâ-va/Hak-kâ-fa
- "Hak-kâ-va" in Chinese characters
- Native to: Southeast China (Eastern Guangdong, Western Fujian, Southern Jiangxi, Western Hunan), Taiwan, Hong Kong (New Territories), overseas communities (particularly in Southeast Asia)
- Ethnicity: Hakka
- Native speakers: 44 million (2023)
- Language family: Sino-Tibetan: Sinitic; Chinese; Hakka
- Early forms: Proto-Sino-Tibetan: Old Chinese; Proto-Hakka
- Dialects: Meixian; Wuhua; Tingzhou; Sixian; Huizhou
- Writing system: Chinese characters; Latin script (Pha̍k-fa-sṳ; Hakka Pinyin System; Hagfa Pinyim; Pinfa)

Official status
- Official language in: Taiwan (Note: National language in Taiwan; also statutory status in Taiwan as one of the languages for public transport announcements and for the naturalisation test.)
- Regulated by: Taiwan: Ministry of Education Hakka Affairs Council; China: Guangdong Province Department of Education

Language codes
- ISO 639-3: hak
- Glottolog: hakk1236
- Linguasphere: 79-AAA-g > 79-AAA-ga (+ 79-AAA-gb transition to 79-AAA-h)
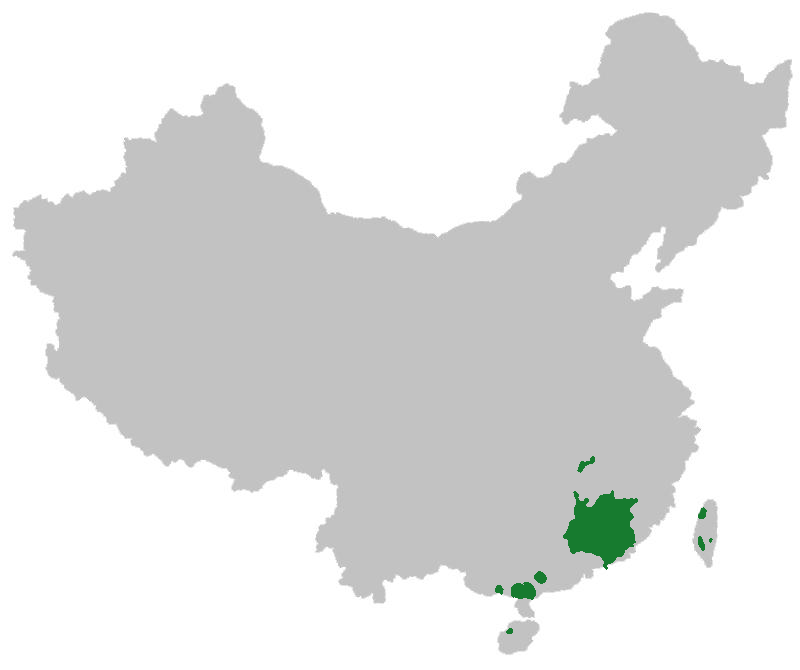

Hakka Chinese
- Simplified Chinese: 客家话
- Traditional Chinese: 客家話
- Hakka: hag5 ga1 fa4 or hag5 ga1 va4
Transcriptions
Standard Mandarin
- Hanyu Pinyin: Kèjiāhuà
Wu
- Romanization: Kah-ka-ho
Gan
- Romanization: Khak-ka-ua
Hakka
- Romanization: hag5 ga1 fa4 or hag5 ga1 va4
- Pha̍k-fa-sṳ: Hak-kâ-fa or Hak-kâ-va
Yue: Cantonese
- Yale Romanization: Haak gā wá
- Jyutping: haak^{3} gaa^{1} waa^{2}
Southern Min
- Hokkien POJ: Kheh-oē

A Hakka speaker, recorded in Taiwan

Hakka is a language group of varieties of Chinese spoken natively by the Hakka people in parts of Southern China, Taiwan, some diaspora areas of Southeast Asia and in overseas Chinese communities around the world.

Due to its primary usage in isolated regions where communication is limited to the local area, Hakka has developed numerous varieties or dialects, spoken in different provinces, such as Guangdong, Guangxi, Hainan, Fujian, Sichuan, Hunan, Jiangxi, Guizhou, as well as in Taiwan, Singapore, Malaysia, Thailand and Indonesia. Hakka is not mutually intelligible with Yue, Wu, Min, Mandarin or other branches of Chinese, and itself contains a few mutually unintelligible varieties. It is most closely related to Gan and is sometimes classified as a variety of Gan, with a few northern Hakka varieties even being partially mutually intelligible with southern Gan. There is also a possibility that the similarities are just a result of shared areal features.

Taiwan designates Hakka as one of its national languages, thus regarding the language as a subject for its study and preservation. Pronunciation differences exist between the Taiwanese Hakka dialects and mainland China's Hakka dialects; even in Taiwan, two major local varieties of Hakka exist.

The Meixian dialect (Moiyen) of northeast Guangdong in mainland China has been taken as the "standard" dialect by the government of mainland China. The Guangdong Provincial Education Department created an official romanization of Moiyen in 1960, one of four languages receiving this status in Guangdong.

The She ethnic group and Hakka people have a history of contact; the Shanke dialect is either closely related to or heavily influenced by Hakka, if not both.

== Etymology ==
The name of the Hakka people who are the predominant original native speakers of the variety literally means "guest families" or "guest people": Hak (Mandarin: kè) means "guest", and ka (Mandarin: jiā) means "family". Among themselves, Hakka people variously called their language Hak-ka-fa (-va), Kak-ka-fa (-va), Hak-fa (-va), Kak-fa (-va), Tu-gong-dung-fa (-va), literally "Native Guangdong language", and Ngai-fa (-va), "My/our language". In Tonggu County, Jiangxi province, people call their language Huai-yuan-fa.

== History ==
=== Early history ===
It is commonly believed that Hakka people have their origins in several episodes of migration from North China into South China during periods of war and civil unrest dating back as far as the end of the Western Jin (266–316). The forebears of the Hakka came from present-day Central Plains provinces of Henan and Shaanxi, and brought with them features of Chinese varieties spoken in those areas during that time. Since then, the speech in those regions has evolved into dialects of modern Mandarin Chinese.

There are many archaic features in Hakka, including final consonants -p -t -k, as found in other modern southern Chinese varieties, but lost in Mandarin.

Laurent Sagart (2002) considers Hakka and Gan Chinese to be sister dialects that descended from a single common ancestral language (proto-Southern Gan) spoken in central Jiangxi during the Song Dynasty. In Hakka and Gan, Sagart (2002) identifies a non-Chinese substratum that is possibly Hmong–Mien, an archaic layer, and a more recent Late Middle Chinese layer. Lexical connections between Hakka, Kra-Dai languages, and Hmong-Mien languages have also been suggested by Deng (1999).

Due to the migration of its speakers, Hakka may have been influenced by other language areas through which the Hakka-speaking forebears migrated. For instance, common vocabulary is found in Hakka, Min Chinese, and the She (a Hmong–Mien language).

It is hypothesised that both Hakka and the Chinese variety spoken by the She people derived from a common source, which corresponds to a stage of South Central Highlands Chinese before the two groups separated. Today, most She people in Fujian and Zhejiang speak Shanke dialect, which is closely related to Hakka, and can be considered a dialect of Hakka.

=== Linguistic development ===
A regular pattern of sound change can generally be detected in Hakka, as in most Chinese varieties, of the derivation of phonemes from earlier forms of Chinese. Some examples:

- Characters such as 武 (war, martial arts) or 屋 (room, house), pronounced roughly mwio and uk (mjuX and ʔuwk in Baxter's transcription) in Early Middle Chinese, have an initial v phoneme in Hakka, being vu and vuk in Hakka respectively. Like in Mandarin, labiodentalisation in Hakka also changed mj- to a w-like sound before grave vowels, while Cantonese retained the original distinction (compare Mandarin 武 wǔ, 屋 wū, Cantonese 武 mou^{5}, 屋 uk^{1}).
- Middle Chinese initial phonemes /ɲ/ (ny in Baxter's transcription) of the characters 人 (person, people) and 日 (sun, day), among others, merged with ng- /ŋ/ initials in Hakka (人 ngin, 日 ngit). For comparison, in Mandarin, /ɲ/ became r- /ɻ/ (人 rén, 日 rì), while in Cantonese, it merged with initial y- /j/ (人 yan^{4}, 日 yat^{6}).
- The initial consonant phoneme exhibited by the character 話 (word, speech; Mandarin huà) is pronounced f or v in Hakka (v does not properly exist as a distinct unit in many Chinese varieties).
- Word-initial h [h] as in 學 hɔk usually corresponds with a voiceless alveo-palatal fricative (x [ɕ]) in Mandarin.

== Dialects ==
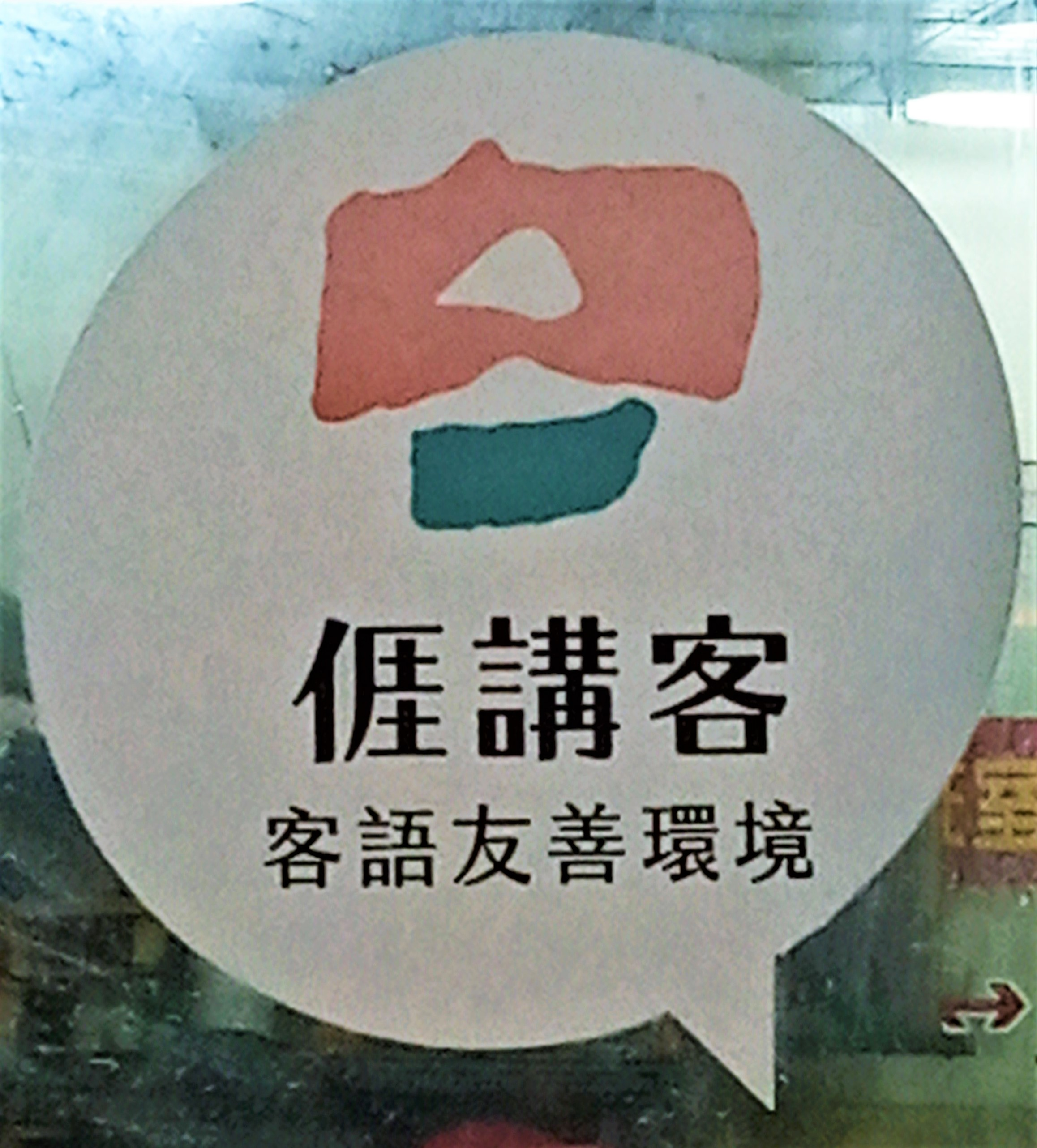
"I speak Hakka. Hakka-language-friendly environment." (𠊎講客。客語友善環境, Ngài kóng Hak. Hak-ngî yû-san fàn-kín)

Hakka has as many regional dialects as there are counties with Hakka speakers as the majority. Some of these Hakka dialects are not mutually intelligible with each other. Meixian, Meizhou is surrounded by the counties of Pingyuan, Dabu, Jiaoling, Xingning, Wuhua, and Fengshun. Each county has its own special phonological points of interest. For instance, Xingning lacks the codas [-m] and [-p]. These have merged into [-n] and [-t], respectively. Further away from Meixian, the Hong Kong dialect lacks the [-u-] medial, so whereas the Meixian dialect pronounces the character 光 as [kwɔŋ˦], the Hong Kong Hakka dialect pronounces it as [kɔŋ˧], which is similar to the Hakka spoken in neighbouring Shenzhen.

Tones also vary across the dialects of Hakka. The majority of Hakka dialects have six tones. However, there are dialects which have lost all of their checked tones (rusheng), and the characters originally of this tone class are distributed across the non-ru tones. An example of such a dialect is Changting, which is situated in Western Fujian province. Moreover, there is evidence of the retention of an earlier Hakka tone system in the dialects of Haifeng and Lufeng, situated in coastal southeastern Guangdong province. They contain a yin-yang splitting in the qu tone, giving rise to seven tones in all (with yin-yang registers in ping and ru tones and a shang tone).

In Taiwan, there are two main dialects: Sixian and Hailu (alternatively known as Haifeng; Hailu refers to Haifeng County and Lufeng County). Most Hakka speakers in Taiwan can trace their ancestry to these two regions. Sixian speakers come from Jiaying Prefecture, mainly from the four counties of Chengxiang (now Meixian), Zhengping (now Jiaoling), Xingning and Pingyuan. Most dialects of Taiwanese Hakka, except Sixian and Dabu, preserved postalveolar consonants ([tʃ], [tʃʰ], [ʃ] and [ʒ]), which are uncommon in other southern Chinese varieties.

- Huizhou dialect (not to be confused with Huizhou Chinese)
- Meixian dialect (otherwise known as Meizhou)
- Wuhua dialect
- Xingning dialect
- Pingyuan dialect
- Jiaoling dialect
- Dabu dialect
- Fengshun dialect
- Hailu dialect
- Sixian dialect
- Raoping dialect
- Zhaoan dialect
- Changting dialect

Ethnologue reports the dialects of Hakka as being Yue-Tai (Meixian, Wuhua, Raoping, Taiwan Kejia: Meizhou above), Yuezhong (Central Guangdong), Huizhou, Yuebei (Northern Guangdong), Tingzhou (Min-Ke), Ning-Long (Longnan), Yugui, and Tonggu.

Glottolog reports the dialects of Hakka as the following:

Glottolog Classification
- Hakka
  - Hailu dialect
  - Huizhou dialect
  - Meixian dialect
  - Ning-Long dialect
  - Raoping dialect
  - Sixian dialect
    - Liudui-Pingtung dialect
    - Taoyuan-Miaoli dialect
  - Tingzhou dialect
    - Changting dialect
    - Liancheng dialect
    - Mingxi dialect
    - Ninghua dialect
    - Qingliu dialect
    - Shanghang dialect
    - Wuping dialect
    - Yongding dialect
  - Tonggu dialect
  - Yuebei dialect
  - Yuezhong dialect
  - Yugui dialect

== Phonology ==
=== Consonants ===
Consonant phonemes
	Bilabial		Labio- dental		Dental/Alveolar		Palatal		Velar		Labia- lized velar		Glottal
Plosive	p	pʰ			t	tʰ	c	cʰ	k	kʰ	kʷ	kʷʰ	
Affricate					ts	tsʰ							
Nasal		m				n		ɲ		ŋ			
Fricative			f		s		ç		x				h
Approximant				ʋ		(-ɹ̩)		j					
Lateral approximant						l							

=== Vowels ===
Hakka vowel chart

Hakka has six monophthongs, nine diphthongs, and one triphthong, along with the semivowel coda /ɹ̩/, which may be realised as [ɨ]. The accompanying vowel chart shows the monophthongs, with the following diphthongs present: iu, iɔ, ea, ie, eu, ɔi, ai, au, and the triphthong iau.

=== Tones ===
Hakka has five tones: high, medium, low, high falling, and mid falling.

== Writing systems ==
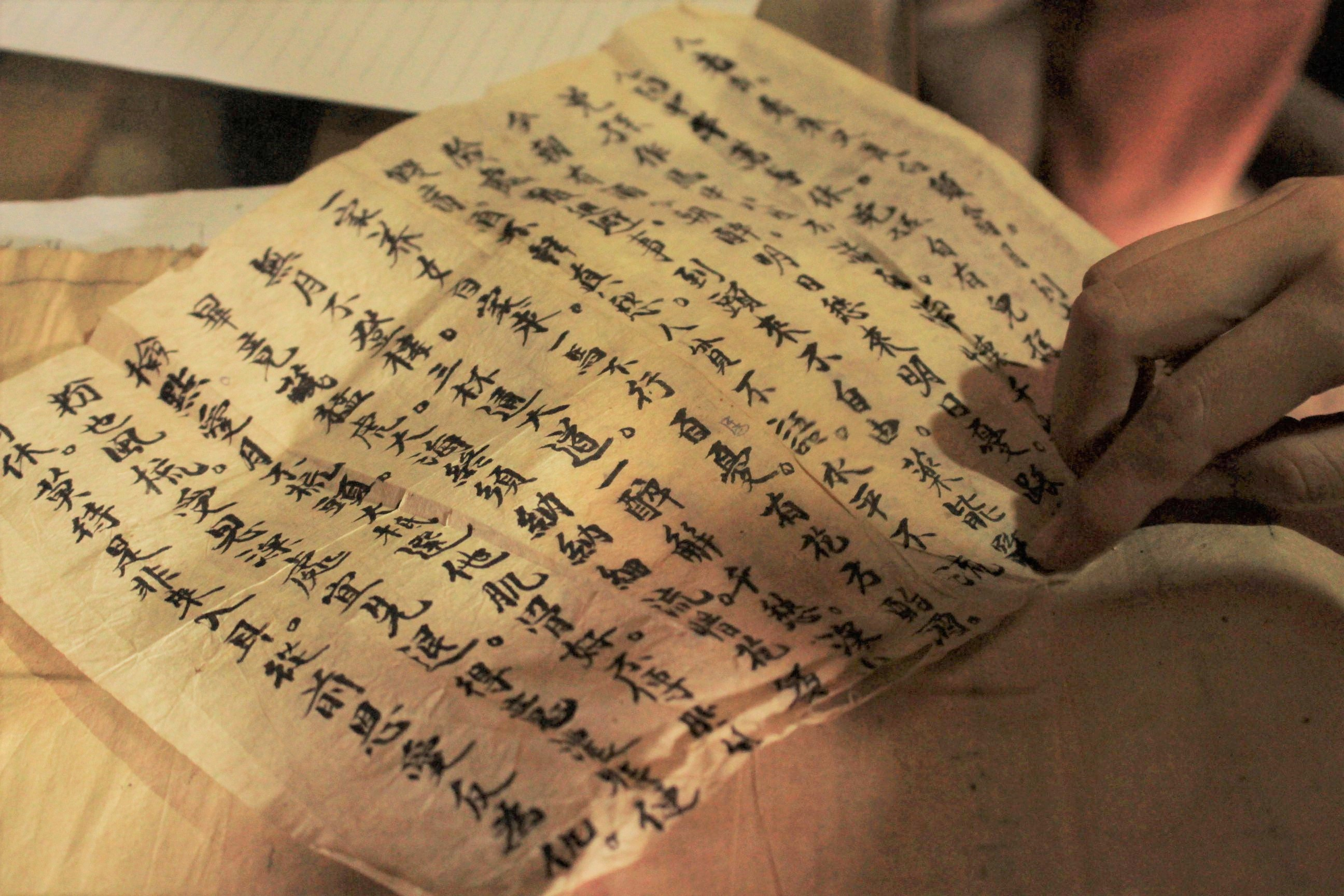
Hakka Chinese Hanzi

=== Chinese script ===
Hakka Chinese is typically written using Chinese characters (漢字, Hon-sṳ).

=== Latin script ===
Various dialects of Hakka such as Taiwanese Hakka, is sometimes written in the Latin script or Pha̍k-fa-sṳ.

Dialects of Hakka have been written in a number of Latin orthographies, largely for religious purposes, since at least the mid-19th century. The popular The Little Prince has also been translated into Hakka (2000), specifically the Miaoli dialect of Taiwan (itself a variant of the Sixian dialect). This also was dual-script, albeit using the Tongyong Pinyin scheme.

== Vocabulary ==
Like other southern Chinese varieties, Hakka retains many single syllable words from earlier stages of Chinese; thus, a large number of syllables are distinguished by tone and final consonant. This reduces the need for compound words. However, like other Chinese varieties, it does have words of more than one syllable.

Monosyllabic words
Character	Pronunciation	Gloss
淨	[tsʰiaŋ˥˧]	'clean'
先	[siɛn˦]	'formerly'
惜	[siak˩]	'care about'
頑	[man˩]	'naughty'
膦	[lin˧˩]	'penis'
屋	[ʋuk˩]	'house'
啜	[tsɔi˥˧]	'mouth'
我	[ŋai˩]	'I', 'me' (Note: In literary readings 我 is pronounced [ŋɔ˦].)
渠 or 佢	[ki˩]	'he', 'she', 'it' (Note: The Standard Chinese equivalents 他/她/它/牠 are pronounced [tʰa˦].)

Polysyllabic words
Character	Pronunciation	Gloss
日頭	[ŋit˩ tʰɛu˩]	'sun'
月光	[ŋiat˥ kuɔŋ˦]	'moon'
屋下	[ʋuk˩ kʰa˦]	'home'
電話	[tʰiɛn˥ fa˥˧]	'telephone'
學堂	[hɔk˥ tʰɔŋ˩]	'school'
筷子	[kʰuai˥ tsɹ̩˧˩]	'chopsticks'

Hakka, as well as numerous other Chinese varieties such as Min and Cantonese, prefers the verb [kɔŋ˧˩] 講 when referring to 'saying', rather than the Mandarin shuō 說 (Hakka [sɔt˩] / [ʃɔt˩]).

Hakka uses 食([sɘt˥] / [ʃit˥]) for the verb 'to eat' and 'to drink', unlike Mandarin which prefers chī 吃 (Hakka [kʰɛt˩] / [kʰiɛt˩]) as 'to eat' and hē 喝 (Hakka [hɔt˩]) as 'to drink' where the meanings in Hakka are different, 'to stutter' and 'be thirsty' respectively.

Examples
Character	Pronunciation	Gloss
阿妹，若母去投墟轉來毋曾？	[a˦ mɔi˥, ŋia˦ mɛ˦ hi˥ tʰɛu˩ hi˦ tsɔn˧˩ lɔi˩ m˩ tsʰiɛn˩]	Has your mother returned from going to the market yet, child?
厥老弟捉倒隻蛘葉來搞。	[kia˧˥ lau˧˩ tʰai˦ tsuk˩ tau˧˩ tsak˩ iɔŋ˩ iap˥ lɔi˩ kau˧˩]	His/her younger brother caught a butterfly to play with.
好冷阿，水桶个水都凝冰阿。	[hau˧˩ laŋ˧˥ ɔ˧, sui˧˩ tʰuŋ˧˩ kɛ˥ sui˧˩ du˦ kʰɛn˩ pɛn˦ ɔ˧]	It's very cold, the water in the bucket has frozen over.

== Media ==
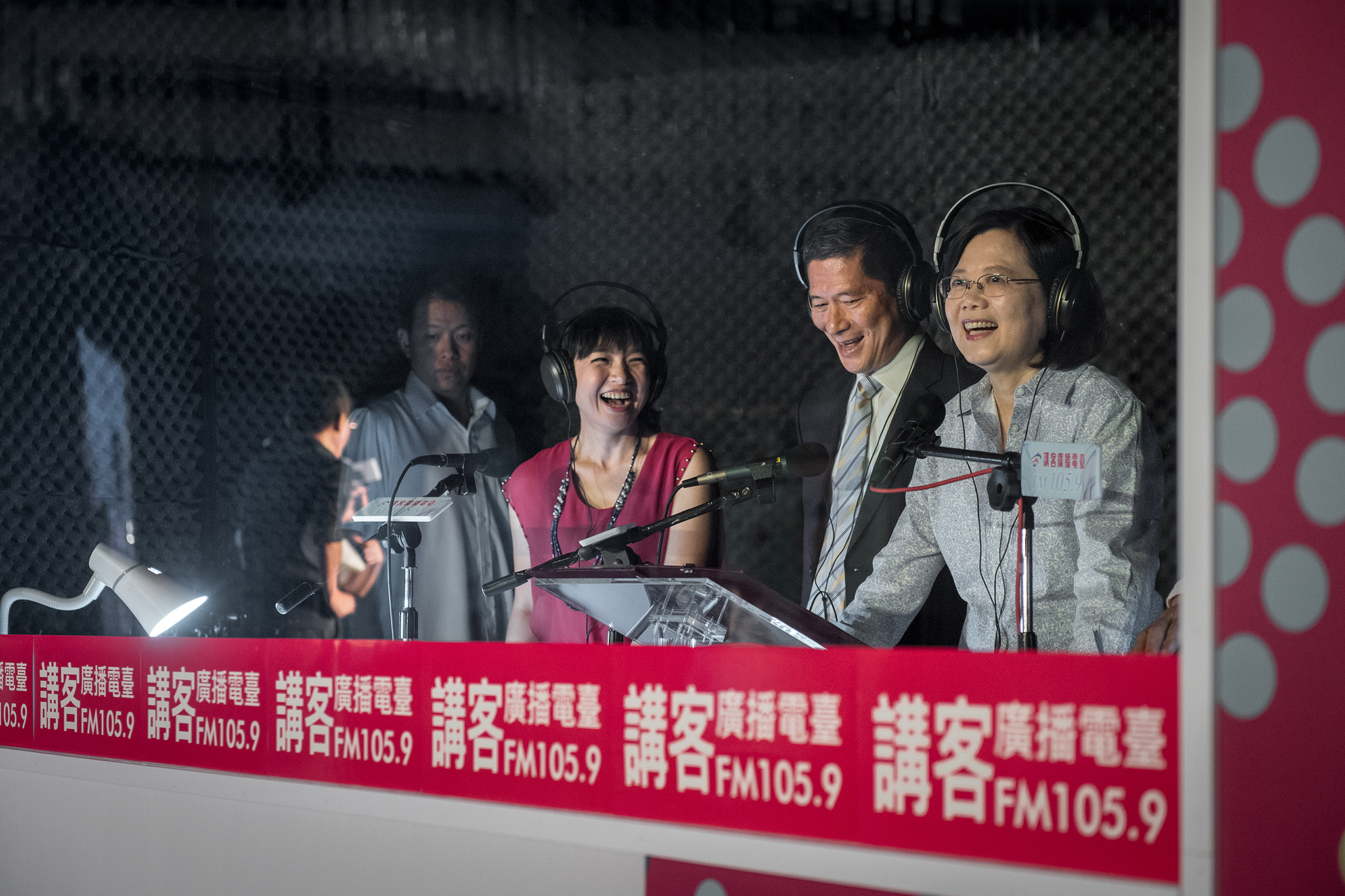
Tsai Ing-wen, President of the Republic of China (Taiwan) and of Taiwanese Hakka descent, appears on "Lecturer Hakka Language Radio Broadcasting" to give a speech.

In 1950, China Central People's Broadcasting Station recruited the first Hakka broadcaster, Zhang Guohua, based on a radius of two kilometers from the Meixian government. On 10 April 1950, the Voice of Hakka (客家之聲) started broadcasting. It broadcast nine hours of Hakka Chinese programs every day through shortwave radio and online radio, targeting countries and regions where Hakka people gather, such as Japan, Indonesia, Mauritius, Reunion Island, Australia, Hong Kong and Taiwan.

In 1988, Meizhou Television Station (梅州電視臺) was founded. In 1994, Hakka Public Channel, also known as Meizhou TV-2 had started broadcasting. Hakka Chinese began to appear in television programs. In 2021, it was renamed Hakka Life Channel (客家生活頻道).

In 1991, Meizhou People's Broadcasting Station (梅州人民廣播電臺), also known as Meizhou Wired Broadcasting Station (梅州有線廣播電臺) officially started broadcasting. Meizhou Radio News: FM94.8 or urban FM101.9. Meizhou Radio Traffic Channel: FM105.8 MHz. Meizhou Radio Private Car Channel: FM94.0 or urban FM103.9. Until now, Hakka Chinese is still used for news program, radio drama program, emotional program, entertainment program and cultural program.

In 1999, 3CW Chinese Radio Australia (3CW澳大利亞中文廣播電臺) was launched. It used Mandarin, Cantonese and Hakka.

In 2001, Meizhou Television Station merged with Meizhou People's Broadcasting Station and was renamed Meizhou Radio and Television Station (MRT, 梅州廣播電視臺). In 2004, the station had officially completed its establishment.

In 2003, Taiwan Broadcasting System established a Hakka satellite cable channel Hakka TV. In Taiwan, there are seven Hakka Chinese radio channels.

In 2005, Meixian Radio and Television Station (梅縣廣播電視臺) was reorganized after the separation of the National Cultural System Reform Bureau. It is a public institution under the jurisdiction of the Meixian County Party Committee and County Government. The channel can be watched in Meizhou and surrounding area with an audience of over 4 million people.

In 2012, Voice of Hong Kong (香港之聲) started broadcasting. Hakka Chinese is used on Sihai Kejia Channel.

In 2019, Shenzhou Easy Radio (神州之聲) added a Hakka Chinese radio break which broadcasts to the southeast coast of Mainland China, Taiwan, Southeast Asia, the South Pacific and Japan. On Radio The Greater Bay (大灣區之聲), Sihai Kejia Channel has also joined.

In 2023, the Xuexi Qiangguo platform under the supervision of the Publicity Department of the Chinese Communist Party had added automatic broadcasting in Hakka Chinese.

== See also ==
- Varieties of Chinese
- Hakka culture
- Pinfa
- Pha̍k-fa-sṳ
- Hagfa Pinyim
- Protection of the varieties of Chinese
- Taiwanese Hakka
