= Huizhou dialect =

Dialect of Chinese spoken in Huizhou, Guangdong

Huizhou
- 惠州话 / 惠州話
- Native to: China
- Region: Huizhou, Guangdong
- Native speakers: 110,000 (2002)
- Language family: Sino-Tibetan: Sinitic; Chinese; Hakka–Gan?; Hakka–She?; Hakka?; Huizhou
- Writing system: Chinese characters Pha̍k-fa-sṳ

Language codes
- ISO 639-3: –
- Glottolog: huiz1243 Huizhou
- Linguasphere: 79-AAA-gai; 79-AAA-gaj

The Huizhou dialect (simplified Chinese: 惠州话; traditional Chinese: 惠州話; pinyin: Huìzhōuhuà) is a Sinitic variety spoken in and around Huicheng District, the traditional urban centre of Huizhou, Guangdong. The locals also call the variety Bendihua (simplified Chinese: 本地话; traditional Chinese: 本地話; pinyin: Běndìhuà; lit. 'local speech') and distinguish it from the varieties spoken in Meixian and Danshui, Huiyang, which they call Hakka (simplified Chinese: 客家话; traditional Chinese: 客家話; pinyin: Kèjiāhuà).

== Classification ==
The classification of the Huizhou dialect is disputed because it shows characteristics of both Yue and Hakka. Most scholars consider the Huizhou dialect a dialect of Hakka with intense influence from Cantonese, but some scholars, most notably Liu Shuxin, consider it to be a dialect of Yue.

The first edition of the Language Atlas of China puts it into its own subgroup under Hakka known as the Huizhou subgroup (惠州片; Huìzhōu piàn). In the second edition, it is still classified as a dialect of Hakka, but it is placed under the Mei–Hui cluster (梅惠小片; Méi-Huì xiǎopiàn) of the Yue–Tai subgroup (粤台片; 粵臺片; Yuè-Tái piàn).

Liu Shuxin groups it together with other similar dialects spoken around the middle and upper reaches of the Dong River, including the Heyuan dialect, into the Hui–He branch (惠河系; Huì-Hé xì) of Yue. Chang Song-hing and Zhuang Chusheng propose a similar grouping called the Hui–He subgroup (惠河片; Huì-Hé piàn), but they classify the group as Hakka. Lau Chunfat, considering this group of dialects distinct from Hakka or Yue, argues for a distinct branch of Sinitic called Huizhou–Shuiyuan.

== Phonology ==
=== Tones ===
The Huizhou dialect has seven tones:

Tone name	dark level (阴平 / 陰平)	light level (阳平 / 陽平)	rising (上声 / 上聲)	dark departing (阴去 / 陰去)	light departing (阳去 / 陽去)	dark entering (阴入 / 陰入)	light entering (阳入 / 陽入)
Example	哥	人	许 / 許	气 / 氣	事	急	及
Tone letter	˧ (33) (Note: Also recorded as ˦ (44) or ˥ (55).)	˨ (22) (Note: Also recorded as ˩ (11) or ˧ (33).)	˧˥ (35)	˨˩˧ (213) (Note: Also recorded as ˩˧ (13).)	˧˩ (31) (Note: Also recorded as ˥˧ (53) or ˨˩ (21).)	˦˥ (45), ˥ (5)	˨˩ (21) (Note: Also recorded as ˨ (2), ˩ (1) or ˧ (3).)

Other than these seven tones, ˥ (55) appears in some grammatical particles.

== Grammar ==
=== Verbal aspect ===
The Huizhou dialect has several aspectual markers that attach to the verb as suffixes:

Aspect	Marker
Progressive	紧 / 緊 /kin˧˥/, 稳 / 穩 /ũn˧˥/
Continuous	住 /tsʰy˧˩/
Perfective	抛 / 拋 /pʰau˧ ~ au˧ ~ ei˧/, 阿 /a˧/, □ /ei˥/
Experiential	过 / 過 /kɔ˨˩˧/

=== Pronouns ===
The Huizhou dialect has the following personal pronouns. The plural is formed by a tone change.

	Singular	Plural
1st person	我 /ŋɔi˨˩˧/	我 /ŋɔi˧˥/
2nd person	你 /ni˨˩˧/	你 /ni˧˥/
3rd person	佢 /kʰy˨/	佢 /kʰy˧˥/

== Vocabulary ==
The Huizhou dialect has many cognates with Yue and/or Hakka (cognates with Huizhou are shaded in blue):

English	Huizhou	Guangzhou (Yue)	Meixian (Hakka)	Putonghua
fly (insect)	乌蝇 / 烏蠅 /ũ˧ zən˨/	乌蝇 / 烏蠅 wu^{1} jing^{1}	乌蝇 / 烏蠅 vu^{1} yin^{2}	苍蝇 / 蒼蠅 cāngyíng
house	屋 /ək˦˥/	屋 uk^{1}	屋 vug^{5}	房子 fángzi
sleep	𰥛觉 / 瞓覺 /hun˨˩˧ kau˨˩˧/	𰥛觉 / 瞓覺 fan^{3} gaau^{3}	睡目 soi^{4} mug^{5}	睡觉 / 睡覺 shuìjiào
see	睇 /tʰiɛ˧˥/	睇 tai^{2}	看 kon^{4}	看 kàn
maize	包粟 /pau˧ sək˦˥/	粟米 suk^{1} mai^{5}	包粟 bau^{1} xiug^{5}	玉米 yùmǐ
younger brother	老弟 /lau˧˥ tʰiɛ˨˩˧/	细佬 / 細佬 sai^{3} lou^{2}	老弟 lau^{3} tai^{1}	弟弟 dìdi
water chestnut	马蹄 / 馬蹄 /ma˨˩˧ tʰiɛ˨/	马蹄 / 馬蹄 maa^{5} tai^{2}		荸荠 / 荸薺 bíqi
water chestnut	马荠 / 馬薺 /ma˨˩˧ tsʰi˨/		马荠 / 馬薺 ma^{1} qi^{2}	荸荠 / 荸薺 bíqi
together	一齐 / 一齊 /ĩt˦˥ tsʰiɛ˨/	一齐 / 一齊 jat^{1} cai^{4}		一起 yīqǐ
together	一下 /ĩt˦˥ ha˧˩/		一下 yid^{5} ha^{4}	一起 yīqǐ
