= Sixian dialect =

Hakka dialect of Taiwan

- 四縣腔
- Pronunciation: Northern: [ɕi˥ i̯en˥ kʰi̯oŋ˨˦] Southern: [ɕi˥ i̯an˥ kʰi̯oŋ˨˦]
- Native to: Taiwan
- Region: Miaoli County; Taoyuan; Kaohsiung; Pingtung County; Huatung Valley
- Ethnicity: Taiwanese Hakka
- Language family: Sino-Tibetan: Sinitic; Chinese; Hakka–Gan?; Hakka–She?; Hakka; Yue-Tai; Meihui; Sixian dialect
- Dialects: Northern Sixian; Southern Sixian
- Writing system: Chinese characters Pha̍k-fa-sṳ; Hakka Pinyin System

Official status
- Regulated by: Hakka Affairs Council

Language codes
- ISO 639-3: –
- Glottolog: sanh1239 Sixian liud1234 Liudui-Pingtung taoy1234 Taoyuan-Miaoli

Sixian dialect
- Traditional Chinese: 四縣話
- Simplified Chinese: 四县话
Transcriptions
Standard Mandarin
- Hanyu Pinyin: Sìxiànhuà
Hakka
- Pha̍k-fa-sṳ: Si-yen-fa

Alternative Chinese name
- Traditional Chinese: 四縣腔
- Simplified Chinese: 四县腔
Transcriptions
Standard Mandarin
- Hanyu Pinyin: Sìxiànqiāng
Hakka
- Pha̍k-fa-sṳ: Si-yen-khiông

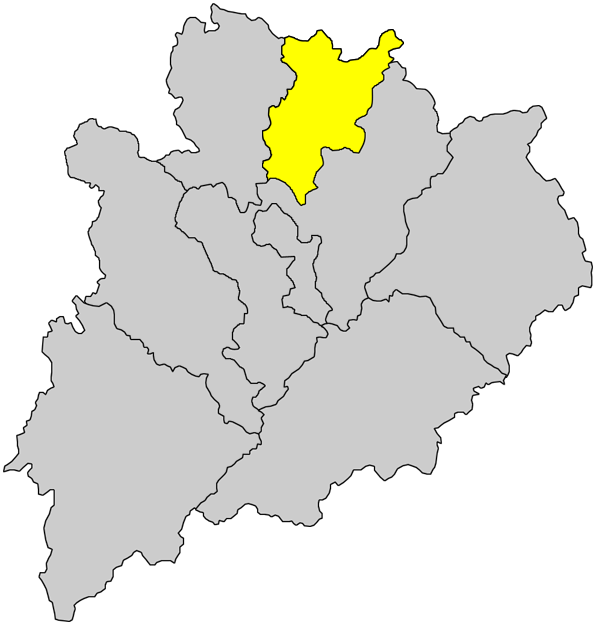
Jiaoling County (yellow) in Meizhou, Guangdong

Liudui in Kaohsiung and Pingtung, the area where Southern Sixian is spoken

The Sixian dialect, also known as the Sixian accent (traditional Chinese: 四縣腔; simplified Chinese: 四县腔; Sixian Hakka Romanization System: Xi ien kiongˊ / Xi ian kiongˊ; Pha̍k-fa-sṳ: Si-yen-khiông / Si-yan-khiông), is a dialect of Hakka used by Taiwanese Hakkas, and it is the most spoken dialect of Taiwanese Hakka, being used in Hakka broadcasting in many public occasions. The Sixian dialect is generally spoken in northern and southern Taiwan, with main representative regions being Taoyuan and Miaoli in the north, as well as the Liudui Region in Kaohsiung and Pingtung in the south.

Taiwanese Hakka is often called Si Hai Yong Le Da Ping An (四海永樂大平安; 四海永乐大平安; Sì Hǎi Yǒng Lè Dà Píng Ān), referring to the Sixian (四縣; 四县), Hailu (海陸; 海陆), Yongding (永定), Changle (長樂; 长乐), Dabu (大埔), Raoping (饒平; 饶平) and Zhao'an (詔安; 诏安) dialects. Among these, the Sixian and Changle dialects originate in Jiaying Prefecture, Guangdong, established in 1733 during the Qing dynasty under the rule of Yongzheng Emperor. Historically, the Jiaying Prefecture governed five counties. The Sixian dialect comes from the four counties of Chengxiang (now Meixian), Zhengping (now Jiaoling), Xingning and Pingyuan, giving it the name Sixian (four counties); the Changle dialect originates in its eponym, the county of Changle (now Wuhua). Currently, speakers of the Yongding and Changle dialects have basically left their own accent families, so only the Sixian, Hailu, Dabu, Raoping and Zhao'an dialects remain in use in Taiwan. In Taiwan, the only widely used Hakka dialects are Sixian and Hailu.

The Sixian dialect of Taiwan is slightly different from the Meixian dialect of mainland China since the majority of immigrants from Jiaying Prefecture are from Zhenping County, which is present-day Jiaoling County, so the Sixian dialect is closer to the Jiaoling dialect of mainland China. There are also differences in vocabulary and phonology between the Sixian dialect spoken in northern Taiwan (called Northern Sixian or Miaoli dialect) and in Liudui of southern Taiwan (called Southern Sixian). Because of the differences between the two varieties of Sixian, the recitation contests in the National Language Competition separate the contest into the two accents of (Northern) Sixian and Southern Sixian. Alternatively, Sixian may include Xingning and Changle, but because these two counties were formerly a part of Huizhou fu, they may be closer to the Hailu dialect.

== Phonology ==
=== Consonants ===
	Labial		Alveolar		Palatal		Velar		Glottal
Nasal	m		n		n̠ʲ		ŋ		
Plosive	p	pʰ	t	tʰ			k	kʰ	
Affricate			t͡s	t͡sʰ	t͡ɕ	t͡ɕʰ			
Fricative	f	v	s		ɕ				h
Approximant			l		j (S)				

- Note: The zero consonant, like in 恁 (IPA: /an˧˩/), is not listed in the table above.

=== Rhymes ===
According to the Handbook for Using the Hakka Romanization System (《客家語拼音方案使用手冊》; 《客家语拼音方案使用手册》) published by the Taiwanese Ministry of Education, the rhymes can be split into three categories: yin rhymes (陰聲韻; 阴声韵), yang rhymes (陽聲韻; 阳声韵), and checked rhymes (入聲韻; 入声韵).

==== Yin rhymes ====
Yin rhymes are rhymes with a pure vowel or a complex vowel.

===== Pure vowels =====
	Front	Central	Back
Close	i	ɨ	u
Mid	e		o
Open	a		

===== Complex vowels =====
a-						ai̯			au̯	
e-									eu̯	
i-	i̯a	i̯ai̯ (S)	i̯au̯	i̯e	i̯eu̯		i̯o	i̯oi̯	i̯u	i̯ui̯
o-						oi̯				
u-	u̯a	u̯ai	u̯e		u̯i					

==== Yang rhymes ====
Yang rhymes end in a nasal consonant. They can be syllabic nasals or nuclei (pure or complex vowel) with nasal codas.

===== Syllabic nasals =====
m̩	n̩	ŋ̍

===== Nuclei with nasal codas =====
-m	am	em	ɨm	im	i̯am	i̯em						
-n	an	en	ɨn	in	i̯an (S)	i̯en	i̯on	i̯un	on	un	u̯an	u̯en
-ŋ	aŋ				i̯aŋ		i̯oŋ	i̯uŋ	oŋ	uŋ	u̯aŋ	

==== Checked rhymes ====
Checked rhymes end with a stop consonant (/p̚/,/t̚/,/k̚/) and a short vowel before it.

-p	ăp̚	ĕp̚	ɨ̆p̚	ĭp̚	i̯ăp̚	i̯ĕp̚						
-t	ăt̚	ĕt̚	ɨ̆t̚	ĭt̚	i̯ăt̚ (S)	i̯ĕt̚	i̯ŏt̚	i̯ŭt̚	ŏt̚	ŭt̚	u̯ăt̚	u̯ĕt̚
-k	ăk̚				i̯ăk̚		i̯ŏk̚	i̯ŭk̚	ŏk̚	ŭk̚	u̯ăk̚	

=== Tones ===
Using [t͡sʰo] and [t͡sʰok] as examples:

Tone	Level		Rising	Departing	Entering	
Dark/Light	Dark	Light	Rising	Departing	Dark	Light
Tone value	24 (N, S); 33 (S)	11	31	55	2	5
IPA	t͡sʰo˨˦ / t͡sʰo˧	t͡sʰo˩	t͡sʰo˧˩	t͡sʰo˥	t͡sʰŏk̚˨	t͡sʰŏk̚˥

==== Tone sandhi ====
In compounds, if a dark-level tone is followed by a dark-level, light-entering or departing tone, the dark-level tone (24) changes to the light-level tone (11). In Southern Sixian, if a light-level tone (11) is not in the end of a compound, it is changed to the dark-level tone (33 in Meinong). In the Dalukuan and Guangfu Village accents, there are seven tone sandhi rules: the "low" dark-level and light-level tones mostly become a mid tone (33) or a high rising tone (35); thus, the tones of these two areas sound higher than the other areas in Liudui.

== Related Hakka dialects ==
In China, the Dabu and Fengshun Counties originally belonging to the Chaozhou fu have been combined with the former Jiaying Prefecture, establishing Meizhou. Historically, other than the Sixian and Changle dialects, the Dabu and Fengshun dialects were also brought to Taiwan from areas presently governed by Meizhou in China. The Fengshun dialect mainly originates in Fengshun and Jieyang Counties. However, in Taiwan, speakers of the Dabu and Fengshun dialects are still traditionally considered to be Chaozhou Hakkas. Other than the Dabu and Fengshun dialects, the Raoping dialect is also from Chaozhou, specifically the Raoping and Huilai Counties.

In Taiwan, the Sixian dialect is the most spoken dialect spoken by the Hakkas, and following is the Hailu dialect (Sixian Hakka Romanization System: hoiˋ liug kiongˊ). The Hailu dialect originates in Huizhou fu (present-day Huizhou and Shanwei) in mainland China, so it is also sometimes called the Huizhou dialect. Since there are many Hakka dialects in Taiwan, when Taiwanese Hakkas interact with each other, there may be influences from other dialects, forming a dialect between the Sixian and Hailu dialects called the Si-Hai dialect (or Hai-Si dialect). The Sihai dialect is not a particular accent, but is just formed because of the interaction between different Hakka groups. Taiwanese Hakka can generally be classified under the Yue-Tai dialects, which are also called the Si-Hai dialects.

The Sixian, Hailu, Changle, Dabu and Raoping dialects all come from Guangdong, China, so Taiwanese Hakkas trace back their origins to Guangdong. Even Hakkas from Tingzhou fu, Fujian, consider themselves to be from Yuedong (Guangdong). Therefore, there is a parallel between "Yuedong Hakkas" and "Minnan Hoklos". Taiwanese Hakka dialects from Fujian include the Yongding, Zhao'an and Tingzhou dialects. The Yongding dialect originates in the Yongding, Shanghang and Wuping Counties of Tingzhou fu. Its phonology is close to Yuedong dialects (e.g. Sixian and Dabu dialects). The Tingzhou dialect originates in the Changting, Ninghua, Qingliu, Guihua and Liancheng Counties of Tingzhou fu. The Zhao'an dialect originates in the Zhao'an, Pinghe, Nanjing and Hua'an Counties of Zhangzhou fu. The Zhao'an and Tingzhou dialects are quite different from the Yue-Tai (Si-Hai) dialects, making them unique in Taiwan.

== Works cited ==
- Bù biān bǎn Kèjiāyǔ fēnjí jiàocái dì-èr cè jiàoshī shǒucè (Sìxiàn qiāng) 部編版客家語分級教材 第二冊教師手冊（四縣腔） (PDF) (in Chinese). Jiaoyubu. 2011. pp. VI. Archived from the original (PDF) on 2016-04-12.
- Bù biān bǎn Kèjiāyǔ fēnjí jiàocái dì-liù cè xuéshēng yòng shū (Nán Sìxiàn qiāng) 部編版客家語分級教材 第六冊學生用書（南四縣腔） (PDF) (in Chinese). Jiaoyubu. 2012. p. III. ISBN 978-986-02-8660-1. Archived from the original (PDF) on 2013-10-04.
- Jiaoyubu (November 2012b), Kèjiāyǔ pīnyīn fāng'àn shǐyòng shǒucè 客家語拼音方案使用手冊 [Hakka Pinyin Scheme User Manual] (PDF) (in Chinese), archived from the original (PDF) on 2016-09-15.
