= Hagfa Pinyim =

Romanization system of Hakka

Hagfa Pinyim (lit. 'Hakka Pinyin') is a system of romanization used to transcribe Chinese characters as used in Hakka into Latin script. Hagfa Pinyim was developed by Lau Chun-fat (Chinese: 劉鎮發) for use in his Hakka Pinyin Dictionary (Chinese: 客語拼音字彙; lit. 'Hakka Pinyin Vocabulary') that was published in 1997. The romanization system is named after the Pinyin system used for Mandarin Chinese and is designed to resemble Pinyin.

== Current system ==
Hagfa Pinyim uses the Latin alphabet and numbers to indicate tones. A single hyphen is used to represent a compound. The vowels listed are conventional forms, however irregular forms may occur.

=== Consonants ===
Hagfa Pinyim	Extended bopomofo	IPA	Examples
b	ㄅ	p	bag5 伯
p	ㄆ	pʰ	pag6 白
d	ㄉ	t	du3 肚
t	ㄊ	tʰ	tai4 大
g	ㄍ	k	ga1 家
k	ㄎ	kʰ	kiung4 共
z	ㄗ	ts	zo4 做
c	ㄘ	tsʰ	ca1 車
s	ㄙ	s	se4 細
j	ㄐ	tɕ	ji1 知
q	ㄑ	tɕʰ	qi2 徐
x	ㄒ	ɕ	xi4 四
l	ㄌ	l	li1 鯉
m	ㄇ	m	mi3 美
n	ㄋ	n	nai2 泥
ng	ㄫ	ŋ	ngiu2 牛
f	ㄈ	f	fi1 飛
v	ㄪ	v/ʋ	vun2 文
h	ㄏ	h	heu4 後

=== Semivowel ===
Hagfa Pinyim	Extended bopomofo	IPA	Examples
y	ㄧ	j	yi1 羽

=== Vowels ===
Hagfa Pinyim	Extended bopomofo	IPA
a	ㄚ	a
i	ㄧ	i
u	ㄨ	u
e	ㄝ	e
o	ㄛ	o
i	ㄭ	ɨ/ɹ̩

=== Tones ===
Tone number	Chinese tone name	Meixian	Huiyang	Hong Kong	Sixian	Hailu	Examples
1	yinping (dark even)	44	44	33	24	53	fon1 歡
2	yangping (light even)	11	11	11	11	55	teu2 頭
3	yinshang (dark rising)	31	31	31	31	24	hi3 喜
3	yangshang (light rising) (merged with yinshang)	31	31	31	31	24	hi3 喜
4	yinqu (dark departing)	52	53	53	55	11	mian4 面
4	yangqu (light departing)	—	—	—	—	33	
5	yinru (dark entering)	1	1	32	2	5	zug5 粥
6	yangru (light entering)	5	5	5	5	2	sid6 食

- All words are written in their original tones instead of tones with tone sandhi.

== See also ==
- PinFa, Guangdong Romanization for Hakka
- Pha̍k-fa-sṳ
- Hakka Pinyin System
