= Raoping Hakka =

Hakka dialect of Southern China and Taiwan

Raoping
- 饒平客家話
- Native to: Southern China, Taiwan
- Region: Raoping County (Guangdong), Taoyuan, Hsinchu, Miaoli, Taichung (Taiwan)
- Language family: Sino-Tibetan: Sinitic; Chinese; Hakka–Gan?; Hakka–She?; Hakka; (unclassified); Raoping
- Writing system: Chinese characters Pha̍k-fa-sṳ; Hakka Pinyin System

Language codes
- ISO 639-3: –
- Glottolog: raop1234

Raoping Hakka (traditional Chinese: 饒平客家話; simplified Chinese: 饶平客家话; Taiwanese Hakka Romanization System: ngiau pin kagˋ gaˇ faˋ), also known as Shangrao Hakka (traditional Chinese: 上饒客家話; simplified Chinese: 上饶客家话), is a dialect of Hakka Chinese spoken in Raoping, Guangdong, as well as Taiwan.

== Distribution ==
In Raoping County, Hakka is spoken in the north, including the towns of Shangshan, Shangrao, Raoyang, Jiucun, Jianrao, and Xinfeng, as well as some villages in Hanjiang Forest Farm. As of 2005, there are 190,000 Hakka speakers in Raoping County (19% of the county's population).

The distribution of Raoping Hakka in Taiwan is scattered. It is mainly spoken in Taoyuan City (Zhongli, Pingzhen, Xinwu, Guanyin, Bade), Hsinchu County (Zhubei, Qionglin), Miaoli County (Zhuolan), and Taichung City (Dongshi). In 2013, only 1.6% of Hakka people in Taiwan were reported to be able to communicate in the Raoping dialect.

== Contact with surrounding varieties ==
Raoping Hakka has some phonological and lexical features that appear to come from contact with Teochew. Some nasalized vowels come from Teochew, such as 鼻 'nose' /pʰĩ˧˥/ (Teochew /pʰĩ˩/), 好 'to like' /hãũ˥˧/ (Teochew /hãũ˨˩˧/). Some characters that were pronounced with a 溪 initial (/kʰ/) in Middle Chinese but with /f/ or /h/ in the Meixian dialect are pronounced with /kʰ/, just like in Teochew, such as 苦 'bitter' /kʰu˥˧/ (Meixian /fu˧˩/, Teochew /kʰɔ˥˧/), 去 'to go' /kʰiəu˥˧/ (Meixian /hi˥˧/, Teochew /kʰɯ˨˩˧/). There is also many shared lexical items with Teochew:

English	Chinese characters	Teochew	Raoping Hakka (Raoping County)
cigarette	薰	/huŋ˧/	/fun˩/
peanut	地豆	/ti˩ tau˩/	/tʰi˧˥ tʰeu˧˥/
congee	糜	/mue˥/	/moi˥/
comfortable	心適	/sim˧ sek˨˩/	/sim˩ set˨˩/
just; exactly	堵堵	/tu˥˧ tu˥˧/	/tu˥˧ tu˥˧/

In Taiwan, Raoping Hakka is in contact with other varieties of Hakka, notably Sixian and Hailu dialects. There are some phonological and morphological features that appear to originate in these surrounding varieties. For example, in Taoyuan near Sixian-speaking areas, the diminutive suffix is pronounced /e˧˩/ as it is pronounced in Sixian, while in Hailu-dominant Hsinchu, the suffix is pronounced as the Hailu /ə˥/.

== See also ==
- Taiwanese Hakka
