= Pinfa =

The Hakka Pinyin Scheme (客家話拼音方案) or Pinfa refers to a romanization scheme published by the Guangdong Provincial Education Department in September 1960 as one of four systems collectively referred to as Guangdong Romanization. The scheme describes the Meixian dialect spoken in Meizhou, Guangdong, which is considered to be the prestige dialect of Hakka, and was later adapted for Gan and Xiang. This system utilizes the Latin alphabet with superscript numbers to represent tone.

== System ==
=== Letters ===
This system uses the Latin alphabet, excluding the letters ⟨r⟩ and ⟨w⟩. It also adds the letter ⟨ê⟩ to represent [ɛ].

=== Initials ===
There are 20 initials used, in addition to the null initial which occurs when no consonant is in the initial position. These are shown below:

b [p] 波	p [pʰ] 婆	m [m] 摸	f [f] 火
d [t] 多	t [tʰ] 拖	n [n] 挪	l [l] 羅
g [k] 哥	k [kʰ] 科	ng [ŋ] 我	h [h] 河
j [t͡si-] 擠	q [t͡sʰi-] 妻	x [si-] 西	v [ʋ] 窩
z [t͡s] 資	c [t͡sʰ] 雌	s [s] 思	y [j] 音

The letter ⟨i⟩ which follows the consonants ⟨z⟩, ⟨c⟩ and ⟨s⟩, represents [ɨ] e.g. 資 zi^{1}, 雌 ci^{1}, 思 si^{1}.

=== Finals ===
There are a total of 74 finals, shown below:

i [ɨ]/[ɹ̩] 資	i [i] 衣	u [u] 姑
a [a] 阿	ia [ia] 也	ua [ua] 掛
o [ɔ] 哦	io [iɔ] 喲	uo [uɔ] 過
ê [ɛ] 這	iê [iɛ] (撒)	uê [uɛ] 穢
ai [ai] 挨	iai [iai] 椰	uai [uai] 怪
oi [ɔi] 哀		
au [au] 凹	iau [iau] 腰	
êu [ɛu] 歐		
	iu [iu] 有	
	iui [iui] 銳	ui [ui] 貴
am [am] 庵	iam [iam] 淹	
êm [ɛm] 砧		
em [əm] 針	im [im] 陰	
an [an] 班	ian [ian] 煙	uan [uan] 關
on [ɔn] 安	ion [iɔn] 阮	uon [uɔn] 管
ên [ɛn] 恩	iên [iɛn] 邊	uên [uɛn] 耿
en [ən] 真	in [in] 因	
	iun [iun] 允	un [un] 敦
ang [aŋ] 冷	iang [iaŋ] 影	uang [uaŋ] 礦
ong [ɔŋ]} 江	iong [iɔŋ] 央	uong [uɔŋ] 光
	iung [iuŋ] 雍	ung [uŋ] 工
ab [ap] 鴨	iab [iap] 葉	
êb [ɛp] 粒		
eb [əp] 汁	ib [ip] 邑	
ad [at] 八	iad [iat] 乙	uad [uat] 刮
od [ɔt] 遏		
êd [ɛt] 北	iêd [iɛt] 鱉	uêd [uɛt] 國
ed [ət] 質	id [it] 一	
	iud [iut] (郁)	ud [ut] 骨
ag [ak] 扼	iag [iak] 錫	uag [uak] □
og [ɔk] 惡	iog [iɔk] 約	uog [uɔk] 郭
	iug [iuk] 育	ug [uk] 督
m [m] 唔	n [n] 五	

In the instance where a final beginning with ⟨i⟩ such as ⟨i⟩ ⟨ia⟩ ⟨iau⟩ etc. without an initial consonant (null initial) the ⟨i⟩ is replaced with ⟨y⟩, e.g. ⟨yi⟩, ⟨ya⟩, ⟨yau⟩ etc.

=== Tones ===
Tone class	陰平	陽平	上聲	去聲	陰入	陽入
Tone number	1	2	3	4	5	6
Tone letter	˦	˩	˧˩	˥˨	˩	˥
Tone contour	44	11	31	52	11	55
Example	夫 fu^{1}	扶 fu^{2}	府 fu^{3}	富 fu^{4}	福 fug^{5}	服 fug^{6}

== See also ==
- Guangdong Romanization
- Hakka Chinese
- Meixian dialect
- Pha̍k-fa-sṳ
- Hakka Pinyin System
- Hagfa Pinyim
