= Taiwanese Hakka =

Chinese topolect spoken in Taiwan

- 臺灣客家語 / 臺灣客話 toiˇ vanˇ hagˋ gaˊ ngiˊ / toiˇ vanˇ hagˋ fa thòi-vàn hak-kâ-ngî / thòi-vàn hak-fa
- Pronunciation: Sixian: [tʰoi˩ van˩ hak̚˨ fa˥] Hailu: [tʰoi˥ van˥ hak̚˨ fa˩] Dapu: [tʰoi˧ van˩˩˧ kʰak̚˨˩ fa˥˧] Raoping: [tʰoi˧ van˥ kʰak̚˥ fa˨˦] Zhao'an: [tʰai˧ ban˥˧ kʰa˥ su˥]
- Native to: Taiwan
- Region: Taoyuan, Miaoli, Hsinchu, Pingtung, Kaohsiung, Taichung, Nantou, Changhua, Yunlin, Yilan, Hualien and Taitung
- Ethnicity: Hakka Taiwanese
- Speakers: L1: 330,000 (2020); L2: 870,000 (2020); Total: 1.2 million (2020)
- Language family: Sino-Tibetan: Sinitic; Chinese; Hakka–Gan?; Hakka–She?; Hakka; Yue-Tai & Hailu; Taiwanese Hakka
- Dialects: Sixian; Hailu; Dapu; Raoping; Zhao'an
- Writing system: Traditional Chinese Characters; Latin (Pha̍k-fa-sṳ, Hakka Pinyin System)

Official status
- Official language in: Taiwan (Note: National language in Taiwan; also statutory status in Taiwan as one of the languages for public transport announcements and for the naturalisation test.)
- Regulated by: Hakka Affairs Council

Language codes
- ISO 639-3: –
- ISO 639-6: htia
- Glottolog: None
- Linguasphere: 79-AAA-gap
- Proportion of residents aged 6 or older using Hakka at home in Taiwan, in 2010

Taiwanese Hakka is a language group consisting of Hakka dialects spoken in Taiwan, and mainly used by people of Hakka ancestry. Taiwanese Hakka is divided into five main dialects: Sixian, Hailu, Dapu, Raoping, and Zhao'an. The most widely spoken of the five Hakka dialects in Taiwan are Sixian and Hailu. The former, possessing 6 tones, originates from Meizhou, Guangdong, and is mainly spoken in Miaoli, Pingtung and Kaohsiung, while the latter, possessing 7 tones, originates from Haifeng and Lufeng, Guangdong, and is concentrated around Hsinchu. Taiwanese Hakka is also officially listed as one of the national languages of Taiwan. In addition to the five main dialects, there are the northern Xihai dialect and the patchily distributed Yongding, Fengshun, Wuping, Wuhua, and Jiexi dialects.

== Geographic distribution ==
Townships/cities and districts in Taiwan where Hakka is a statutory regional language according to the Hakka Basic Act

In 2014, 4.2 million Taiwanese self-identified as Hakka, accounting for 18% of the population. The Hakka Affairs Council has designated 70 townships and districts across Taiwan where the Hakka account for more than a third of the total population, including 18 in Miaoli County, 11 in Hsinchu County, and another 8 in Pingtung, Hualien, and Taoyuan counties each.

== Status ==
With the introduction of martial law in 1949, the KMT-led government repressed Hakka, along with Taiwanese Hokkien and other indigenous languages in favor of Mandarin. In 1988, the Hakka community established the Restore My Mother Tongue Movement to advocate for the right to use and preserve the Hakka language. Language restrictions were relaxed after 1987 with the lifting of martial law and ensuing democratic reforms. In 2012, the ministry-level Hakka Affairs Council was established to stem the language's decline in Taiwan. In December 2017, the Legislative Yuan designated Hakka as an official national language of Taiwan.

== Sociolinguistics ==
While Hakka has official status in Taiwan, it has seen ongoing decline due to a language shift to the more dominant Taiwanese Mandarin and Taiwanese Hokkien. The number of Hakka speakers in Taiwan has declined by 1.1% per year, particularly among youth. In 2016, only 22.8% of self-identifying Hakkas aged 19 to 29 spoke the language. Today, Taiwanese Hakka tends to be used within families and within local communities, which has reduced intergenerational transmission. An estimated 2 million Hakkas now self-identify as Hoklo. Furthermore, the great diversity of Hakka dialects used throughout Taiwan has impeded standardization of Hakka for teaching.

== See also ==
- Taiwanese Hakka Romanization System
- Languages of Taiwan
