= Hakka Pinyin System =

Romanization system for Taiwanese Hakka

- Script type: Latin alphabet
- Languages: Taiwanese Hakka

Related scripts
- Sister systems: Pha̍k-fa-sṳ

The Hakka Pinyin System (客家語拼音方案, Pha̍k-fa-sṳ: Hak-kâ-ngî Phîn-yîm Fông-on), originally known as the Taiwanese Hakka Pinyin System (臺灣客家語拼音方案, Pha̍k-fa-sṳ: Thòi-vàn Hak-kâ-ngî Phîn-yîm Fông-on), also known as the Hakka Romanisation System or the Taiwanese Hakka Romanisation System, is the Romanization system for Taiwanese Hakka currently used by the Ministry of Education of the Republic of China.

The 2008 Taiwanese Hakka Pinyin System was revised based on the 2003 "Taiwanese Hakka Tongyong Pinyin System," and was expanded to include transcription support for five additional dialects: Sixian, Hailu, Dabu, Raoping, and Zhaoan. It was re-published after further revisions in 2009. In 2012, transcription support for the Southern Sixian dialect was added, descriptions were adjusted, and the name was changed to the Hakka Pinyin System.

== Current system ==
=== Initials ===
The top-left of each cell is the Hakka Pinyin, the top-right is the International Phonetic Alphabet (IPA), and at the bottom are Extended Bopomofo symbols.

		Bilabial		Labiodental		Alveolar		Postalveolar		Alveolo-palatal	Palatal	Velar		Glottal
		Voiceless	Voiced	Voiceless	Voiced	Voiceless	Voiced	Voiceless	Voiced	Voiceless	Voiced	Voiceless	Voiced	Voiceless
Nasal			m [m] ㄇ				n [n] ㄋ				ngi [ɲ] ㄬ		ng [ŋ] ㄫ	
Plosive	Unaspirated	b [p] ㄅ	bb [b] ㆠ			d [t] ㄉ						g [k] ㄍ		[ʔ] （Unmarked）
Plosive	Aspirated	p [pʰ] ㄆ				t [tʰ] ㄊ						k [kʰ] ㄎ		
Affricate	Unaspirated					z [ʦ] ㄗ		zh [ʧ] ㄓ		j [ʨ] ㄐ				
Affricate	Aspirated					c [ʦʰ] ㄘ		ch [ʧʰ] ㄔ		q [ʨʰ] ㄑ				
Fricative				f [f] ㄈ	v [ʋ] ㄪ	s [s] ㄙ		sh [ʃ] ㄕ	rh [ʒ] ㄖ	x [ɕ] ㄒ				h [h] ㄏ
Approximant											r [j] 一			
Lateral							l [l] ㄌ							

- bb [b] is used for the Zhaoan dialect in Yunlin, Guoxing Township in Nantou, and parts of the southern Hakka speaking regions in Taiwan, where bb [b] often replaces v [ʋ].
- j [ʨ], q [ʨʰ], and x [ɕ] are only used in the Sixian dialect; other dialects use z [ʦ], c [ʦʰ], and s [s].
- r [j] is only used in the Southern Sixian dialect.
- h (ㄏ) is pronounced as [x] in Mandarin, which is different from the [h] in Hakka.

=== Vowels ===
	Front vowel	Central vowel	Back vowel	
Close vowel	i [i] ㄧ	ii [ɨ]/[ɹ̩] ㄭ	u [u] ㄨ	
Close-mid vowel	e [e] ㄝ		er [ɤ] ㄜ	o [o] ㄛ
Open-mid vowel	ee [ɛ] ㆤ		oo [ɔ] ㆦ	
Open vowel	a [a] ㄚ			

- The original "Taiwanese Hakka Tongyong Pinyin System" did not include phonetic symbols for ee [ɛ] and oo [ɔ].
- ee [ɛ] and oo [ɔ] are only used in the Zhaoan dialect.
- er [ɤ] is used in the Hailu and Raoping dialects.

=== Final consonants ===
	Bilabial	Alveolar	Velar
Nasal	-m [m] ㄇ	-n [n] ㄋ	-ng [ŋ] ㄫ
Plosive	-b [p̚] ㄅ	-d [t̚] ㄉ	-g [k̚] ㄍ

=== Tones ===
Tone marks are placed at the top-right after the syllable.

Chinese tone name	Tone mark	Diacritics	Examples (Sixian dialect)	Examples (Hailu dialect)	Examples (Dabu dialect)	IPA
去聲 (Departing); 陽入 (Light Entering)	v	Unmarked	富 fu 服 fug			55(˥˥); 5(˥)
陰平 (Dark Level)	vˊ	Acute accent	夫 fuˊ			24(˨˦)
陰平 (Dark Level)	v^{˖}	Modifier Letter Plus Sign		護 fu^{˖}		33(˧˧)
上聲 (Rising); 陰入 (Dark Entering)	vˋ/vˆ	Grave accent/ Circumflex	府 fuˋ 福 fugˋ		虎 fuˆ	31(˦˨); 2(˨)
陽平 (Light Level)	vˇ	Caron	糊 fuˇ			11(˩˩)

- Tone 33 is absent from the Sixian dialect, except in regions that speak the Southern Sixian dialect, e.g. Meinong District, Kaohsiung (see Sixian dialect).

=== Examples ===
Using the words: "臺灣客家語拼音方案" as an example:

- Northern Sixian dialect: toiˇ vanˇ hagˋ gaˊ ngiˊ pinˊ imˊ fongˊ on
- Southern Sixian dialect: toiˇ vanˇ hagˋ gaˊ ngiˊ pinˊ (r)imˊ fongˊ on
- Hailu dialect: toi van hag gaˋ ngiˋ pinˋ rhimˋ fongˋ onˇ
- Dabu dialect: toiˇ vanˇ kagˆ ga^{˖} ngi^{˖} pin^{˖} rhim^{˖} fong^{˖} onˋ
- Raoping dialect: toi van kagˋ gaˇ ngiˇ pinˇ rhimˇ fongˇ onˋ
- Zhaoan dialect: taiˋ bbanˋ kaˊ gaˇ ngiˆ pinˇ rhimˇ fongˇ onˆ

== See also ==
- Taiwanese Hakka
- Pha̍k-fa-sṳ
- Hagfa Pinyim
- Pinfa
