= Pha̍k-fa-sṳ =

Hakka Chinese romanization system

Pha̍k-fa-sṳ (白話字) is an orthography similar to Pe̍h-ōe-jī and used to write Hakka, a variety of Chinese. Hakka is a whole branch of Chinese, and Hakka dialects are not necessarily mutually intelligible with each other, considering the large geographical region. This article discusses a specific variety of Hakka. The orthography was invented by the Presbyterian church in the 19th century. The Hakka New Testament published in 1924 is written in this system.

== Writing system ==
Pha̍k-fa-sṳ uses a modified Latin alphabet, with an additional double-dotted ṳ for the close central unrounded vowel /ɨ/ (also realised as /ɹ̩/) and some diacritics for tones. A single hyphen is added to indicate a compound.

== History ==
Shortly after the missionaries of the Basel Missionary Society, Reverend Theodore Hamberg and Rudolf Lechler arrived in China in 1847, Hamberg and his colleagues began compiling the Hakka to English to Hakka to German dictionaries. Lechler was initially allocated the evangelizing work amongst the Shantou population, but because of opposition from the local authorities there, the Shantou mission was abandoned and he joined Hamberg in the mission work with the Hakka in 1852. After Hamberg died unexpectedly in 1854, Lechler continued with the dictionary work together with fellow missionary colleagues for over fifty years. During that time, Reverend Charles Piton also made several revisions to the dictionary.

The first publication of Romanized Hakka in Pha̍k-fa-sṳ was done by Donald MacIver (1852–1910) in 1905 at Shantou and was titled A Chinese-English dictionary : Hakka-dialect, as spoken in Kwang-tung province. He noted that some of the content was based on the dictionaries compiled by the previous Basel missionaries. However, the latter had used the Lepsius romanization, which was different from Pha̍k-fa-sṳ. MacIver made the changes to the dictionary, but he realised that Hakka vocabulary written by the Basel missionaries belonged to the Hakka dialects of southeastern Guangdong Province: Haifeng County, Lufeng County, Jiexi County and Wuhua County. On the other hand, MacIver's Hakka vocabulary was extracted from the northeastern part of Guangdong Province such as Jiaying Prefecture (now Meizhou).

== Current system ==
=== Letters ===
| Capital letters | A | Ch | Chh | E | F | H | I | K | Kh | L | M | N | Ng | O | P | Ph | S | T | Th | U | Ṳ | V | Y |
| Lowercase letters | a | ch | chh | e | f | h | i | k | kh | l | m | n | ng | o | p | ph | s | t | th | u | ṳ | v | y |
| Letter names | a | chi | chhi | e | fi | hi | i | ki | khi | li | mi | ni | ngi | o | pi | phi | si | ti | thi | u | ṳ | vi | yi |

=== Consonants ===
| Pha̍k-fa-sṳ | Extended bopomofo | IPA | Examples |
|---|---|---|---|
| p | ㄅ | p | pak-kûng 伯公 |
| ph | ㄆ | pʰ | pha̍k-fa 白話 |
| m | ㄇ | m | Mî-koet 美國 |
| f | ㄈ | f | fî-kî 飛機 |
| v | ㄪ | ʋ | vùn-sṳ 文字 |
| t | ㄉ | t | tú-sṳ́ 肚笥 |
| th | ㄊ | tʰ | thai-ngìn 大人 |
| n | ㄋ | n | nài-sâ 泥沙 |
| l | ㄌ | l | lî-mà 鯉嬤 |
| k | ㄍ | k | kâ-yèn 家園 |
| kh | ㄎ | kʰ | khiung-ha 共下 |
| ng(i) | ㄫ | ŋ/ɲ | ngiù-ngiuk 牛肉 |
| h | ㄏ | h | heu-sâng 後生 |
| ch(i) | ㄗ/ㄐ | ts/tɕ | cho-tet 做得 |
| chh(i) | ㄘ/ㄑ | tsʰ/tɕʰ | chhâ-é 車仔 |
| s(i) | ㄙ/ㄒ | s/ɕ | se-ngìn 細人 |

=== Semivowel ===
| Pha̍k-fa-sṳ | Extended bopomofo | IPA | Examples |
|---|---|---|---|
| y | ㄧ | j | yîm-ngo̍k 音乐 |

=== Vowels ===
| Pha̍k-fa-sṳ | Extended bopomofo | IPA |
|---|---|---|
| a | ㄚ | a |
| i | ㄧ | i |
| u | ㄨ | u |
| e | ㄝ | e |
| o | ㄛ | o |
| ṳ | ㄭ | ɨ/ɹ̩ |
| er | ㄜ | ɤ/ə |

=== Tone marks ===
Listed below are tone marks of Pha̍k-fa-sṳ with tone value of Sixian and Hailu dialects of Taiwanese Hakka:

| Chinese Tone Name | Tone Mark | Diacritics | Examples | Sixian | Hailu |
|---|---|---|---|---|---|
| 陰平 yīnpíng | ◌̂ | circumflex | 夫 fû | 24 | 53 |
| 陽平 yángpíng | ◌̀ | grave accent | 扶 fù | 11 | 55 |
| 上聲 shǎngshēng | ◌́ | acute accent | 府 fú | 31 | 24 |
| 陰去 yīnqù | (no mark) | | 富 fu | 55 | 11 |
| 陽去 yángqù | ◌̊ | ring | 護 fů | 55 | 33 |
| 陰入 yīnrù | (no mark) | | 福 fuk | 2 | 5 |
| 陽入 yángrù | ◌̍ | vertical line | 服 fu̍k | 5 | 2 |

== Comparison of Chinese and Taiwanese Pha̍k-fa-sṳ ==
Comparisons were made between The Hakka New Testament (1924) and the Hakka Bible: Today's Taiwan Hakka Version (2012). The former was published in Shantou, China, while the latter was published in Taiwan.

=== Initials ===
Below are rules for switching between Chinese and Taiwanese Pha̍k-fa-sṳ:

Comparison of Initials
| Rules | Character | Chinese PFS | Taiwanese PFS |
|---|---|---|---|
| ny→ng | 源 | nyên | ngièn |
| sh→s | 水 | shúi | súi |
| ts→ch | 做 | tsò | cho |
| tsh→chh | 自 | tshṳ̀ | chhṳ |
| kw→k | 光 | kwong | kông |

=== Tone marks ===
The table below compares the tone marks of Chinese Pha̍k-fa-sṳ, Taiwanese Pha̍k-fa-sṳ, and Pe̍h-ōe-jī of Southern Min.

Comparison of Tone Marks of Pha̍k-fa-sṳ and Pe̍h-ōe-jī
| Tone Name | Chinese PFS | Taiwanese PFS | Taiwanese POJ |
|---|---|---|---|
| 陰平 | a | â | a |
| 陽平 | â | à | â |
| 陰上 | á | á | á |
| 陽上 | á | á | (ǎ) |
| 陰去 | à | a | à |
| 陽去 | à | (å) | ā |
| 陰入 | ap | ap | ap |
| 陽入 | a̍p | a̍p | a̍p |

Notes:

1. Taiwanese Hakka does not differentiate between 陰上 (yīnshǎng) and 陽上 (yángshǎng). Certain dialects (but not the standard) of Taiwanese Hokkien does have yángshǎng (ǎ).
2. Sixian Hakka does not differentiate between 陰去 (yīnqù) and 陽去 (yángqù), but Hailu does have yángqù (å).

== See also ==
- Pe̍h-ōe-jī
- Hagfa Pinyim
- Hakka Pinyin System
- Pinfa
- Hakka Bible: Today's Taiwan Hakka Version
