= Pingyuan County, Guangdong =

Coordinates: 24°39′38″N 115°54′36″E

Pingyuan 平远县 Pingyun; Pingyün; Pingyüan
- County
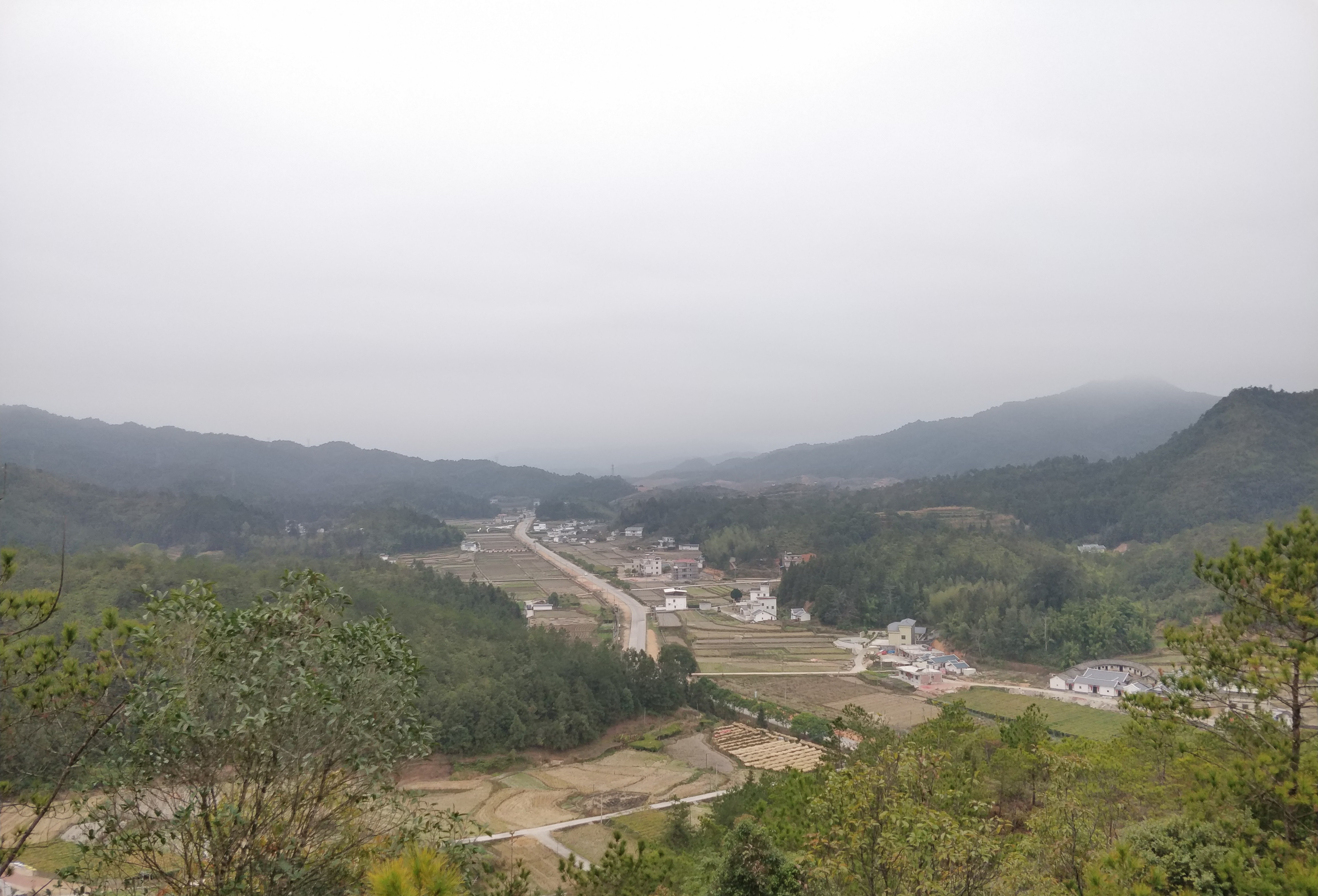

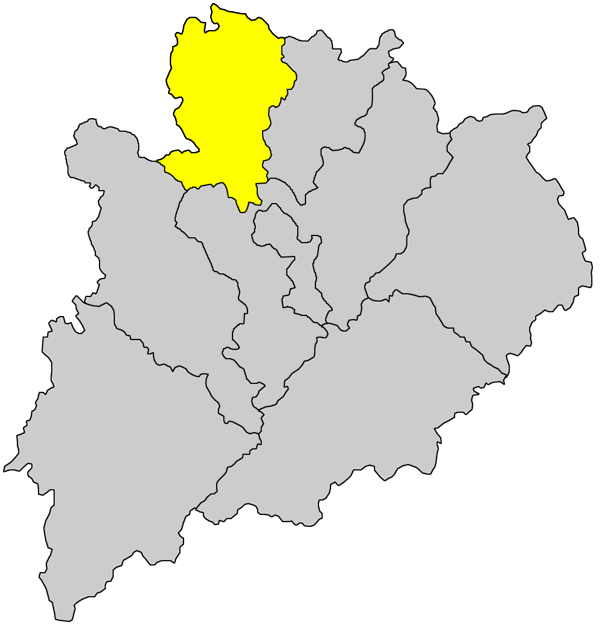
- Pingyuan County in Meizhou

- Meizhou in Guangdong
- Country: People's Republic of China
- Province: Guangdong
- Prefecture-level city: Meizhou

Area
  - Total: 1,381 km^{2} (533 sq mi)

Population (2020 census)
  - Total: 190,482
  - Density: 137.9/km^{2} (357.2/sq mi)
- Time zone: UTC+8 (China standard)
- Website: www.pingyuan.gov.cn

Pingyuan County (postal: Pingyun; simplified Chinese: 平远县; traditional Chinese: 平遠縣; pinyin: Píngyuǎn Xiàn, Hakka: Phin-yen) is a county in the northeast of Guangdong Province, People's Republic of China. It is under the administration of Meizhou City.

== Geography ==
Pingyuan County is located in the northeast of Guangdong province, on the border between Guangdong, Jiangxi and Fujian province. It was founded in the Ming Dynasty Jiajing in the 42nd year (year 1863). Because it is located between Wuping County (in Fujian) and Anyuan County (in Jiangxi), it was named ‘Pingyuan’.

Pingyuan County is under the jurisdiction of Meizhou City which is known as the home of standard Hakka. The total area of Pingyuan is 1381 square kilometers. Now it has 12 towns with a population of 250 thousand.

== Climate ==
Climate data for Pingyuan, elevation 201 m (659 ft), (1991–2020 normals, extremes 1981–2021)
| Month | Jan | Feb | Mar | Apr | May | Jun | Jul | Aug | Sep | Oct | Nov | Dec | Year |
|---|---|---|---|---|---|---|---|---|---|---|---|---|---|
| Record high °C (°F) | 28.3 (82.9) | 29.9 (85.8) | 32.7 (90.9) | 34.8 (94.6) | 36.1 (97.0) | 37.6 (99.7) | 39.0 (102.2) | 38.7 (101.7) | 37.4 (99.3) | 35.8 (96.4) | 34.5 (94.1) | 29.8 (85.6) | 39.0 (102.2) |
| Mean daily maximum °C (°F) | 17.7 (63.9) | 19.3 (66.7) | 21.9 (71.4) | 26.2 (79.2) | 29.5 (85.1) | 31.8 (89.2) | 33.9 (93.0) | 33.5 (92.3) | 31.9 (89.4) | 28.8 (83.8) | 24.6 (76.3) | 19.5 (67.1) | 26.6 (79.8) |
| Daily mean °C (°F) | 11.5 (52.7) | 13.6 (56.5) | 16.7 (62.1) | 21.2 (70.2) | 24.6 (76.3) | 26.9 (80.4) | 28.3 (82.9) | 27.8 (82.0) | 26.4 (79.5) | 22.8 (73.0) | 18.1 (64.6) | 13.1 (55.6) | 20.9 (69.7) |
| Mean daily minimum °C (°F) | 7.5 (45.5) | 9.8 (49.6) | 13.1 (55.6) | 17.5 (63.5) | 21.1 (70.0) | 23.5 (74.3) | 24.3 (75.7) | 24.1 (75.4) | 22.5 (72.5) | 18.4 (65.1) | 13.6 (56.5) | 8.7 (47.7) | 17.0 (62.6) |
| Record low °C (°F) | −4.7 (23.5) | −0.2 (31.6) | −0.2 (31.6) | 7.5 (45.5) | 14.4 (57.9) | 17.0 (62.6) | 19.1 (66.4) | 20.6 (69.1) | 14.8 (58.6) | 7.1 (44.8) | 0.3 (32.5) | −3.8 (25.2) | −4.7 (23.5) |
| Average precipitation mm (inches) | 58.6 (2.31) | 84.2 (3.31) | 153.8 (6.06) | 195.6 (7.70) | 256.0 (10.08) | 289.3 (11.39) | 177.6 (6.99) | 214.5 (8.44) | 124.8 (4.91) | 40.5 (1.59) | 42.8 (1.69) | 42.1 (1.66) | 1,679.8 (66.13) |
| Average precipitation days (≥ 0.1 mm) | 8.1 | 11.0 | 16.6 | 15.9 | 18.3 | 19.6 | 15.0 | 16.6 | 11.6 | 5.0 | 5.8 | 6.7 | 150.2 |
| Average snowy days | 0.2 | 0 | 0 | 0 | 0 | 0 | 0 | 0 | 0 | 0 | 0 | 0 | 0.2 |
| Average relative humidity (%) | 73 | 76 | 80 | 80 | 81 | 82 | 77 | 80 | 77 | 71 | 71 | 70 | 77 |
| Mean monthly sunshine hours | 130.6 | 103.3 | 95.2 | 103.5 | 126.0 | 144.8 | 219.6 | 202.5 | 192.6 | 196.7 | 170.3 | 157.7 | 1,842.8 |
| Percentage possible sunshine | 39 | 32 | 25 | 27 | 31 | 35 | 53 | 51 | 53 | 55 | 52 | 48 | 42 |
Source: China Meteorological Administrationall-time record low

== Ethno-linguistic make-up ==
Pingyuan is noted for its large Hakka population.
