= Pontianak Hakka =

Variety of the Hakka Chinese language

- Bahasa Khek Pontianak
- 坤甸客語; Khun-tîen Hak-ngî (Pha̍k-fa-sṳ)
- Pronunciation: /kʰun²⁴.tʰi̯en⁵⁵.hak⁵.ŋi²⁴/
- Native to: Indonesia (West Kalimantan)
- Region: Primarily in Pontianak and Mempawah. Scattered Hakka-speaking communities can also be found in Kubu Raya, Landak, Sanggau, Sekadau and Sintang
- Ethnicity: Pontianak Chinese
- Native speakers: 86,416 (2013 estimation) (Note: Only in Pontianak city proper.)
- Language family: Sino-Tibetan: Sinitic; Chinese; Hakka; Meixian dialect; Pontianak Hakka
- Writing system: Latin script: Indonesian alphabet (most common); Pha̍k-fa-sṳ (sporadic); Chinese characters

Language codes
- ISO 639-3: –
- IETF: hak-ID
- Regencies and cities in West Kalimantan where Pontianak Hakka is spoken by a significant minority of the population

Pontianak Hakka (Chinese: 坤甸客語; Pha̍k-fa-sṳ: Khun-tîen Hak-ngî; Indonesian: Bahasa Khek Pontianak) It is a variety of Hakka primarily spoken by the Hakka Chinese community in western and central West Kalimantan, Indonesia, particularly in and around the provincial capital, Pontianak. Pontianak Hakka was brought to West Kalimantan by Hakka speakers who migrated from Guangdong, China. Most of these migrants came from Meixian, making Pontianak Hakka a descendant of the Meixian variety. Over time, it has been influenced by Cantonese, Teochew, and the local languages of West Kalimantan, including the local variety of Malay and, more recently, Standard Indonesian, which is also a form of Malay. These influences have contributed to Pontianak Hakka's distinctive phonetic features and unique vocabulary. Pontianak Hakka is primarily spoken in the city of Pontianak and Mempawah Regency, where there is a significant Chinese population. It is also spoken in Kubu Raya, Landak, Sanggau, Sekadau and Sintang, particularly in urban areas with a high concentration of Chinese residents. In contrast, Hakka communities in the northwestern part of West Kalimantan, such as Singkawang and its surrounding areas, speak a different variety descended mainly from the Hailu dialect.

Locally, it is referred to as "soft speech" (軟話), in contrast Singkawang Hakka which is referred as "hard speech" (硬話). In Pontianak, Hakka is the second-most spoken Chinese variety among the local Chinese community, after the regional variety of Teochew. Since the majority of Pontianak's Chinese population is Teochew, the language serves as the lingua franca within the community. As a result, many Hakka speakers in Pontianak are fluent in Teochew, and vice versa. Code-mixing and code-switching between Teochew, Hakka, Pontianak Malay, and Indonesian are common in daily interactions among Pontianak's Chinese community. However, Pontianak Teochew is mainly spoken in the city and certain suburban areas. Outside of Pontianak, particularly to the north of the Kapuas River, Hakka is the dominant language among the Chinese community.

== History ==
Pontianak Hakka
- Traditional Chinese: 坤甸客語
- Simplified Chinese: 坤甸客语
Transcriptions
Standard Mandarin
- Hanyu Pinyin: Kūn diàn kè yǔ
Hakka
- Pha̍k-fa-sṳ: Khun-tîen Hak-ngî

The Chinese began migrating to West Kalimantan in the 18th century, invited by Malay kingdoms such as the Pontianak Sultanate, Sambas Sultanate and the Panembahan Mempawah, who employed them as forced laborers in gold mines. These Chinese migrants were brought in to work in gold mines across areas like Mandor, Monterado, Budok, and Singkawang. At that time, the Chinese population was made up of four major groups: the Hokkien, Teochew, Hakka, and Cantonese. The two largest Chinese groups who migrated to West Kalimantan are the Hakka and Teochew, both of which originated from Guangdong.The Hakka people tend to work as farmers, miners, and small traders in rural areas, while the Teochew people are more likely to settle in urban areas and engage in trade. Most of the Hakka people who migrated to Pontianak came from present-day Meizhou in eastern Guangdong, which is why Pontianak Hakka shares many similarities with the Meixian dialect.

Luo Fangbo, one of the leaders of the first group of Hakka immigrants, was a native of Meizhou. He led more than 100 Hakka immigrants, mostly from Jiaying and Dapu, out of the Pearl River estuary, and after more than two months, they arrived in Borneo. His group eventually settled in Mandor, near Pontianak, where they cleared land, built homes, and planted crops for survival. They also dug wells, expanded their influence inland, and discovered gold and silver mines. Luo established strong relationships with the local king and sultan, and continued to return to China to recruit new immigrants to stabilize and develop the economic foundation of the settlement. In 1777, Luo Fangbo founded the Lanfang Company, with Mandor as its administrative center. The organization, composed primarily of Hakkas, especially those from Meizhou. These individuals often worked together in the nearby gold and silver mines and farmlands. Similar organizations were formed in the Sambas and Pontianak areas. The Hakkas and Teochews are locked in a fierce rivalry over economic dominance in the region. The Lanfang Company was abolished following the consolidation of Dutch rule in West Borneo at the end of the 19th century.

After Indonesia gained independence in the second half of the 20th century, the government implemented a strict naturalization policy for overseas Chinese to foster greater identification with Indonesia's politics and culture. This policy even sought to eliminate Chinese culture through various measures, such as abolishing Chinese schools, prohibiting the publication and import of Chinese literature, and banning the use of Chinese characters in public spaces. These efforts accelerated the assimilation of Chinese Indonesians and led to significant changes in the everyday language used by local Hakka Chinese communities.

Due to historical and environmental changes, the Hakka people in Pontianak have had frequent linguistic interactions with Hakka and Teochew communities from other parts of Guangdong, as well as Cantonese speakers and local indigenous groups. These interactions have led to shifts in both pronunciation and vocabulary. Additionally, the influence of various dialects, along with the introduction of Indonesian and English education, has resulted in a growing number of loanwords from foreign languages.

== Geographical distribution and usage ==
Pontianak Hakka is spoken in Pontianak and various regencies across western and central West Kalimantan, including Kubu Raya, Landak, Mempawah, Sanggau, Sekadau and Sintang. Meanwhile, the Hakkas in Singkawang and nearby areas, such as Bengkayang and Sambas in northwestern West Kalimantan, speak a distinct variety of Hakka that more closely resembles Hailu Hakka, with significant influence from Hopo and Wuhua dialects. Notable differences exist between Pontianak Hakka and Singkawang Hakka, particularly in their phonology and tonal system. The linguistic boundary between Pontianak Hakka and Singkawang Hakka follows the Duri River, which also serves as the political border between Bengkayang and Mempawah Regency. In Pontianak, Hakka is primarily spoken in the northern part of the city, across the Kapuas River, and in its suburbs, while Teochew dominates the city center and southern Pontianak. In addition, small yet significant Hakka communities can also be found in Kubu Raya Regency, just south of Pontianak. Hakka is also spoken by Pontianak Chinese migrants living in Jakarta.

Hakka is the mother tongue of the Hakka people in Pontianak and is commonly used for day-to-day communication within the Hakka community. However, most Hakkas are also bilingual in Teochew the lingua franca of the Chinese community in the city. Many Teochew speakers, on the other hand, are also fluent in Hakka. Additionally, many Hakkas and Pontianak residents in general are proficient in Pontianak Malay, which is commonly used for interethnic communication in the city, as well as Indonesian, the national language and the medium of instruction in schools and government offices. It is common for Hakka speakers to code-switch and code-mix between Hakka, Teochew, Pontianak Malay, and Indonesian, depending on the context and the people they are speaking with. Furthermore, many Hakka and Teochew speakers, particularly older generations who had the opportunity to attend Chinese schools before their closure by the Indonesian government in the mid-1960s, are also fluent in Mandarin. Meanwhile, younger speakers are increasingly learning the language, either through formal education or community initiatives aimed at its preservation.

== Phonology ==
=== Consonants ===
Pontianak Hakka has 21 initials, including one zero initial [∅]. The list is as follows:

Pontianak Hakka initials
		Labial		Alveolar		Postalveolar	Velar	Glottal
		Labial		Apical	Laminal	Postalveolar	Velar	Glottal
		Bilabial	Labiodental	Apical	Laminal	Postalveolar	Velar	Glottal
Nasal		[m] 命 (miaŋ⁵⁵)			[n] 男 (nam¹¹)		[ŋ] 原 (ŋien¹¹)	
Plosive/ Affricate	plain	[p] 巴 (pa²⁴)		[t͡s] 走 (t͡seu³¹)	[t] 釣 (tiao⁵⁵)	[t͡ʃ] 雙 (t͡ʃak²)	[k] 鷄 (kie²⁴)	
Plosive/ Affricate	aspirated	[pʰ] 婆 (pʰo¹¹)		[t͡sʰ] 脆 (t͡sʰe⁵⁵)	[tʰ] 頭 (tʰeu¹¹)	[t͡ʃʰ] 臭 (t͡ʃʰoŋ⁵⁵)	[kʰ] 刻 (kʰat²)	
Plosive/ Affricate	voiced	[b] 黃 (boŋ¹¹)						
Fricative	voiceless		[f] 番 (fan²⁴)	[s] 沙 (sa²⁴)		[ʃ] 順 (ʃun⁵⁵)		[h] 汗 (hon⁵)
Fricative	voiced					[ʒ] 油 (ʒiun¹¹)		
Lateral					[l] 力 (lit⁵)			

Notes:

- The zero initial, like in 暗 (IPA: /am⁵⁵/), is not listed in the table above.
- In Pontianak Hakka, when the initials ts- tsʰ- s- are followed by the medial i, they are palatalized into tɕ- tɕʰ- ɕ- due to the influence of the front vowel i. However, they are still transcribed as ts- tsʰ- s-. For example, 精 (jing), 秋 (qiu), and 線 (xian) are written as /tsin²⁴/, /tsʰiu²⁴/, and /sien⁵⁵/, respectively.
- The voiced bilabial stop initial b- in Pontianak Hakka is influenced by Indonesian pronunciation, where the Indonesian consonant v is pronounced as [fe] rather than as a voiced v- sound. Since Indonesian lacks a v- initial, the Hakka v- initial undergoes a phonetic change and is no longer pronounced as v-. However, Indonesian also does not pronounce it as [fe] but instead shifts it to b-. Both Indonesian and Hakka have the f- initial, so if v- were to change to f-, it would cause confusion with existing f- words. Therefore, Pontianak Hakka shifts the articulation of v- from a labiodental sound to a bilabial stop b-, making it a unique initial sound.

=== Rhymes ===
Pontianak Hakka features five vowel phonemes: i, e, a, o, and u. Additionally, it includes two medial (i, u), three open nasal codas (-m, -n, -ŋ), and three checked codas (-p, -t, -k). This yields eighteen open finals, twenty-one nasal finals, nineteen checked finals, and two syllabic nasals. In total, there are 60 rimes.

==== Pure vowels ====
	Front	Central	Back
Close	[i] 雨 (ʒi³¹)		[u] 普 (pʰu¹¹)
Mid	[e] 洗 (se³¹)		[o] 老 (lo³¹)
Open	[a] 媽 (ma²⁴)		

==== Diphthongs and triphthongs ====
Diphthongs					Triphthongs	
ia 借 (tsia⁵⁵)	iu 舅 (kʰiu²⁴)	oi 愛 (oi⁵⁵)	ie 蟻 (ŋie⁵⁵)	au 教 (kau⁵⁵)	iau 椒 (tsiau²⁴)	uai 筷 (kʰuai⁵⁵)
io 靴 (hio²⁴)	ai 帶 (tai⁵⁵)	ui 雷 (lui¹¹)	ua 瓜 (kua²⁴)	eu 豆 (tʰeu⁵⁵)	ieu 狗 (kieu³¹)	

==== Syllabic consonants ====
	Bilabial	Velar
Nasal	[m̩] 毋 (m̩¹¹)	[ŋ̍] 女 (ŋ̍³¹)

==== Nuclei with nasal codas ====
-m	am 監 (kam⁵⁵)	em 森 (sem²⁴)	im 今 (kim²⁴)	iam 嚴 (ŋiam¹¹)	iem 殗 (ŋiem⁵⁵)					
-n	an 還 (ban¹¹)	en 星 (sen²⁴)	in 新 (sin²⁴)		ien 選 (sien³¹)	ion 全 (tsʰion¹¹)	iun 銀 (ŋiun¹¹)	on 算 (son⁵⁵)	un 門 (mun¹¹)	uan 關 (kuan²⁴)
-ŋ	aŋ 棚 (pʰaŋ¹¹)			iaŋ 鏡 (kiaŋ⁵⁵)		ioŋ 娘 (nioŋ¹¹)	iuŋ 共 (kʰiuŋ⁵⁵)	oŋ 光 (koŋ²⁴)	uŋ 紅 (fuŋ¹¹)	uaŋ 梗 (kuaŋ³¹)

==== Checked rhymes ====
-p	ap 法 (fap²)	ep 丟 (tep²)	ip 及 (kip⁵)	iap 攝 (ŋiap²)	iep □ (kiep⁵)						
-t	at 發 (fat²)	et 北 (pet²)	it 畢 (pit²)		iet 鐵 (tʰiet²)			ot 說 (sot²)	ut 不 (put²)	uat 刮 (kuat²)	uet 國 (uet²)
-k	ak 客 (hak²)			iak 額 (ŋiak²)		iok 弱 (ŋiok⁵)	iuk 綠 (liuk⁵)	ok 捉 (t͡sok²)	uk 目 (muk²)		

=== Tones ===
In Pontianak Hakka, there are a total of six tones. The tones and their characteristics are shown in the table below:

	Upper/Dark (陰)					Lower/Light (陽)				
	No.	Name	Contour	Sandhied	Examples	No.	Name	Contour	Sandhied	Examples
Level (平)	1	陰平 yim-pin	[˨˦] (24)	[˧] (33)	天 [tʰien˨˦], 擔 [tam˨˦]	5	陽平 yong-pin	[˩] (11)	[˩] (11)	求 [kʰiu˩], 圓 [ʒan˩]
Rising (上)	2	上聲 song-sang	[˧˩] (31)	[˧˩] (31)	講 [koŋ˧˩], 管 [kon˧˩]	-				
Departing (去)	3	去聲 hi-sang	[˥˥] (55)	[˥˥] (55)	面 [mien˥˥], 念 [ŋiam˥˥]	-				
Entering (入)	4	陰入 yim-ngip	[˩] (2)	[˩] (2)	骨 [hut˩], 喝 [hot˩]	8	陽入 yong-ngip	[˥] (5)	[˥] (5)	人 [ŋip˥], 月 [ŋiet˥]

==== Tone sandhi ====
Tone sandhi (變調) in Pontianak Hakka is highly limited and closely resembles that of Sixian Hakka. Only one tone undergoes tone sandhi: Tone [˨˦] (24), while all other tones remain unchanged. The only tone sandhi rule in Pontianak Hakka is that when a word with Tone [˨˦] (24) is followed by another word with Tone [˨˦] (24), Tone [˥˥] (55), or Tone [˥] (5), it changes to Tone [˧] (33). For example, the word 天 /tʰien²⁴/ (‘day’) is normally pronounced with Tone [˨˦] (24), but in 天氣 /tʰien²⁴⁻³³.hi⁵⁵/ (‘weather’), where it precedes 氣 /hi⁵⁵/ (‘air’) with Tone [˥˥] (55), 天 shifts to Tone [˧] (33). This tone sandhi occurs in disyllabic or multi-syllabic words, where the first syllable adjusts based on the tone of the following syllable. The original tone before the change is known as the base tone (本調).

== Differences from other Hakka dialects ==
Pontianak Hakka largely retains the phonology, rhymes, and tones of Meixian Hakka as spoken in mainland China but has undergone phonetic and lexical changes due to prolonged interaction with other languages such as Teochew and Indonesian.

=== Phonological aspects ===
Below are some phonological distinctions of Pontianak Hakka in comparison to other Hakka varieties:

- Pontianak Hakka preserves the older pronunciations of certain consonant groups that have since merged in Meixian Hakka. Specifically, consonants that were historically distinct in Middle Chinese phonology remain separate in Pontianak Hakka, whereas they have undergone sound shifts in Meixian Hakka.
- Pontianak Hakka has been influenced by Indonesian, leading to the emergence of double-stop consonants.
- The articulation of certain sounds has shifted from the labiodental region, leading to distinctive phonetic features in Pontianak Hakka.
- Contact with Indonesian has led to a shift in articulation, causing words that originally had the v- initial in other Hakka variants to be pronounced with a voiced bilabial stop b-, following the phonetic shift v- → b-. In contrast, most other Hakka variants lack the b- initial. A similar phenomenon is observed in Yunlin Hakka spoken in Taiwan, where close interaction with Taiwanese Hokkien speakers has influenced pronunciation.
- Pontianak Hakka retains the complete set of nasal codas -m, -n, -ŋ and stop codas -p, -t, -k, similar to Sixian Hakka spoken in Taiwan. However, some vowels have undergone slight phonetic changes due to prolonged language use and evolution.
- There is the emergence of apical (tongue-tip) and velar (tongue-root) emphatic sounds. The influence of Singkawang Hakka has contributed to phonological changes, including the appearance of tripartite initials in certain words.

=== Tones ===
Pontianak Hakka shares a six-tone system with the Meixian dialect in mainland China and the Sixian dialect in Taiwan, both of which originate from Meixian. These tones include yinping, yangping, shangsheng, qusheng, yinru, and yangru. Its most distinctive tonal feature is the shift of fully voiced syllables from shangsheng to qusheng, while qusheng also encompasses a broader range of unstressed syllables. Despite minor variations due to external influences, the overall tonal patterns remain largely consistent. The table below provides a comparative overview of the tones across different Hakka dialects:

	Yinping (陰平)	Yangping (陽平)	Shangsheng (上聲)	Yinqu (陰去)	Yangqu (陽去)	Yinru (陰入)	Yangru (陽入)
Pontianak	[˨˦] 24	[˩] 11	[˧˩] 31	[˥˥] 55		[˩] 2	[˥] 5
Singkawang	[˥˧] 53	[˥˥] 55	[˨˦] 24	[˧˩] 31	[˨˦] (24)	[˧˦] 34	[˥] 5
Jiexi	[˥˧] 53	[˨˦] 24	[˨˩] 21	[˥˧] 42	–	[˩] 2	[˥] 5
Xiuzhuan	[˩˧] 13	[˥˦] 54	[˥˩] 51		[˧] 33	[˨˦] 24	[˧] 3
Wuhua	[˦] 44	[˩˧] 13	[˧˩] 31	[˥˧] 53	[˧˩] (31)	[˩] 1	[˥] 5
Meixian	[˦] 44	[˩] 11	[˧˩] 31	[˥˧] 52		[˩] 1	[˥] 5
Sixian	[˨˦] 24	[˩] 11	[˧˩] 31	[˥˥] 55		[˨˩] 21	[˥] 5
Hailu	[˥˧] 53	[˥˥] 55	[˩˧] 13	[˩] 11	[˧] 33	[˥] 5	[˨˩] 21
Yunlin	[˩] 11	[˥˧] 53	[˧˩] 31		[˥˥] 55	[˨˦] 24	[˩˨] 32
Luhe	[˥˧] 53	[˥˥] 55	[˨˩˧] 213	[˧˩] 31	[˨] 22	[˧˦] 34	[˥˦] 54

=== Vocabulary ===
Due to frequent contact between Pontianak Hakka and Indonesian, since the 1960s, after Indonesia's anti-Chinese policies, a large influx of official vocabulary into local dialects has occurred. The vocabulary of Pontianak Hakka has already been influenced by Indonesian, resulting in phonetic and lexical differences from Meixian Hakka. However, Pontianak Hakka still retains some older terms, some of which no longer exist in other Hakka dialects of mainland China. In other places, some of the traditional Hakka dialect words have fallen out of use, while certain Hakka dialect terms used in Pontianak differ significantly in meaning compared to their equivalents in other Hakka dialects. Additionally, loanwords from mainland China and Taiwan—such as names for tools, clothing, celestial and geographical terms, and agricultural items—do not correspond well to Indonesian terminology. Pontianak Hakka has also developed unique terminologies that are not found in any other Hakka dialects. In addition, Pontianak Hakka vocabulary has been significantly influenced by Teochew, largely due to the Teochew community's dominance in Pontianak and the geographic proximity between Hakka-speaking regions and Chaoshan, the homeland of the Teochew people in Guangdong. Additionally, traces of Cantonese influence can be observed, likely stemming from the strong cultural presence of Cantonese in Guangdong.

== Lexicons ==
Pontianak Hakka retains many lexicons from Meixian Hakka while incorporating a significant number of loanwords from Teochew and, to a lesser extent, Cantonese. Over time, it has also increasingly adopted vocabulary from Indonesian, the national language.

=== Locally coined words ===
Centuries of isolation from their kin in China and Taiwan have led Pontianak Hakka to develop unique vocabulary. Below is a list of distinct words coined in Pontianak Hakka, not found in other Hakka dialects, along with comparisons to Meixian and Sixian Hakka:

Pontianak Hakka	Meixian Hakka	Sixian Hakka	Definition	Note
港 /koŋ³¹/	河壩 /ho¹¹.pa⁵²/	河壩 /ho¹¹.pa⁵⁵/	large river	
埔頭 /pu²⁴.tʰeu¹¹/	圩場 /hi⁴⁴.tsʰoŋ¹¹/	都市 /tu²⁴.sɿ⁵⁵/	city	
公司山 /kuŋ²⁴.si²⁴.san²⁴/	塚埔 /tsʰuŋ³¹.pu²⁴/	地 /tʰi⁵⁵/	cemetery	The term 公司山 originated during the early Hakka migration to Pontianak when sixteen kongsis 'companies' and associations jointly established a cemetery on a hill. This burial ground was provided free of charge to those in need, giving rise to the name 公司山 'company hill'.
後尾 /heu⁵⁵.mui²⁴/	爐下 /tsa³¹.ha⁴⁴/	爐下 /tso⁵⁵.ha²⁴/	kitchen	The word 後尾 'back end' is a distinctive term. In West Kalimantan, typical Hakka houses are built from wood, with the layout arranged sequentially from the front entrance: living room, bedrooms, and spaces for raising livestock. The kitchen is located at the back of the house, hence its name.
插禾 /tsʰap².bo¹¹/ 插秧 /tsʰap².ʒoŋ²⁴/	蒔田 /sɿ⁵².tʰien¹¹/	蒔田 /sɿ⁵⁵.tʰien¹¹/	rice planting	
摘穀 /tsak².kuk²/	割禾 /kot¹.vo¹¹/	割禾 /kot².vo¹¹/	rice harvesting	
春粄 /t͡ʃʰun²⁴.pan³¹/	蛋糕 /tʰan⁵³.kau⁴⁴/	雞卵糕 /ki̯e²⁴.lon³¹.kau̯²⁴/	cake	
額門頭 /ŋiak².mun¹¹.tʰeu¹¹/	額角 /ŋiak².kok¹/	額頭 /ŋiak².tʰeu¹¹/	forehead	
耳鏡 /ŋi³¹.kiaŋ⁵⁵/	耳珠仔 /ŋi³¹.tsu⁴⁴.ue³¹/	耳陀 /ŋi³¹.tʰo¹¹/	earlobe	
肚臍窟 /tu³¹.ʃi³¹.fut²/	肚臍 /tu³¹.tsʰi¹¹/	肚臍 /tu³¹.tsʰi¹¹/	belly button	
烹 /pen²⁴/	炙 /tsak¹/	烤 /kau³¹/ 炙 /tsak²/	to roast	
蜞蚻 /kʰi¹¹.tsʰat⁵/	黃蚻 /voŋ¹¹.tsʰat⁵/	黃蚻 /voŋ¹¹.tsʰat⁵/	cockroach	
火排 /fo³¹.pʰai¹¹/	自來火 /tsʰɿ⁵⁵.loi¹¹.fo³¹/	番仔火 /fan²⁴.e³¹.fo³¹/	fire match	
飯拜 /fan⁵⁵.pai²⁴/	飯勺 /fan⁵².sok⁵/	飯匙 /fan⁵⁵.tsʰɿ¹¹/	rice spoon	
點鐘 /tiam³¹.t͡ʃuŋ²⁴/	時鐘 /sɿ¹¹.t͡suŋ⁴⁴/	時鐘 /sɿ¹¹.t͡suŋ²⁴/	clock	
發香 /pot².hioŋ²⁴/	點香 /tiam³¹.hioŋ²⁴/	點香 /tiam³¹.hioŋ²⁴/	incense	
出柩 /t͡ʃʰut².kiu⁵⁵/	還山 /fan¹¹.san⁴⁴/ 出柩 /t͡ʃʰut¹.kiu⁵²/	出山 /t͡sʰut².san²⁴/	to hold a funeral	
跍暗間 /lok⁵.am⁵⁵.kien²⁴/	坐監 /t͡sʰo⁴⁴.kam⁴⁴/	坐桿 /t͡sʰo²⁴.kon³¹/	jail	
番婆人 /fan²⁴.pʰo¹¹.ŋin¹¹/	婦人家 /fu⁵².ŋin¹¹.ka⁴⁴/	婦人家 /fu⁵⁵.ŋin¹¹.ka²⁴/	married lady	
無影哥 /bu¹¹.ʒaŋ³¹.ko²⁴/	單鳥哥 /tan⁴⁴.tiau⁴⁴.ko⁴⁴/	單身哥仔 /tan²⁴⁻¹¹.sɨn²⁴⁻¹¹.ko².e³¹/	bachelor male	

=== Loanwords ===
==== Teochew ====
Pontianak Hakka has incorporated a significant number of loanwords from Teochew, influenced by the dominance of the Teochew community in Pontianak, where Teochew serves as the lingua franca among local Chinese residents. Below is a list of loanwords in Pontianak Hakka that have been borrowed from Teochew, along with comparisons to the Meixian dialect:

Pontianak Hakka	Meixian Hakka	Teochew	Definition	Note
笑禮 /siau³¹.li²⁴/ 見笑 /kien⁵⁵.siau⁵⁵/	不好意思 /m¹¹.hau³¹.i⁵².sɿ⁵²/	小禮 /siau⁵²⁻³⁵.li⁵²⁻²¹/	shy	
渴 /hot²/	𤸁 /kʰoi⁵²/	乏 /hek⁵/	tired	
豉油 /ʃi⁵⁵.ʒu¹¹/ 豆油 /tʰeu⁵⁵.ʒu¹¹/	白味 /pʰak⁵.mi⁵²/ 豉油 /sɿ⁵².iu¹¹/	豉油 /si˩˨.iu⁵⁵/	soy sauce	
地豆 /tʰi⁵⁵.tʰeu⁵⁵/	番豆 /fan⁴⁴.tʰeu⁵²/	地豆 /ti².tau¹¹/	peanut	
瓜子 /kue²⁴⁻³³.tsi³¹/	瓜子 /kua²⁴.tsɿ³¹/	瓜子 /kue³³⁻²³.t͡si⁵²/	melon seeds	The hanzi characters are identical to those in other Hakka dialects, such as Meixian, but their pronunciation in Pontianak Hakka is more influenced by the Teochew pronunciation /kue³³⁻²³ t͡si⁵²/.

==== Cantonese ====
Some vocabulary in Pontianak Hakka is directly borrowed from Cantonese in both pronunciation and meaning. Due to interactions between Hakka speakers from mainland China and Cantonese-speaking communities, migrants who settled in Pontianak continued to incorporate Cantonese words into their Hakka speech.

Pontianak Hakka	Meixian Hakka	Cantonese	Definition	Note
劏 /tʰoŋ¹¹/	㓾 /t͡ʃʰɿ¹¹/	劏 /tʰɔŋ⁵²/	murder	
雪 /siet²/	冰 /pen²⁴/	雪 /syit⁵³/	ice	Since Indonesia is a tropical country, it has no winter. As a result, natural phenomena like snow and ice are rare. In Cantonese-speaking regions, the word 雪 (syit) can also refer to ice, a distinctive feature of the language.
春 /t͡ʃutŋ²⁴/	蛋 /tʰan⁵⁵/	春 /t͡sʰɵn⁵⁵/ 蛋 /ta:n²²/	egg	

==== Indonesian and Malay ====
Indonesian, the national language, serves as the primary language of government and education in Pontianak, contributing to an increasing lexical influence on Pontianak Hakka. Additionally, since Pontianak was traditionally a Malay homeland, the local variety of Malay has also influenced Pontianak Hakka.

Pontianak Hakka	Meixian Hakka	Malay/Indonesian	Definition	Note
鐳 /lui²⁴/	錢 /tsʰien¹¹/	duit	money	Also used in Southeast Asian Min Nan varieties.
巴撒 /pa²⁴.sak²/	市場 /si⁵⁵.t͡sʰɔŋ¹¹/	pasar	market	Derived from the Persian word bazaar (بازار).
交彎 /kau²⁴.ban²⁴/	朋友 /pʰen¹¹.iu⁴⁴/	kawan	friend	
拉西 /la²⁴.si²⁴/	領帶 /liaŋ⁴⁴⁻³⁵.tai⁵³/	dasi	necktie	
交人 /kau²⁴.ŋin¹¹/	結婚 /kiat¹.fun⁴⁴/	kawin	to marry	The term kawin originally meant "to get married" in Indonesian and Malay. The "ka" and "win" in kawin are inseparable, but since "win" sounds similar to the Hakka word jin, it evolved into "交人" (to marry). Over time, its meaning has broadened to include "marriage" in general.
蕳砃 /kan⁵⁵.taŋ⁵⁵/	馬鈴薯 /ma⁴⁴⁻³⁵.laŋ¹¹.su¹¹/	kentang	potato	
雪文 /sa¹¹.bun²⁴/	番鹼 /fan²⁴.ki̯en³¹/	sabun	soap	Derived from the Portuguese word sabão. Also used in Min Nan languages.
洞葛 /tuŋ³¹.kat⁵/	手杖 /su³¹.t͡sʰoŋ³¹/	tongkat	walking stick	Also used in some Min Nan varieties.
/o²⁴.taŋ¹¹/	差 /tsʰa⁴⁴/ 欠 /kʰiam⁵²/	utang	debt	
/to⁵³.loŋ⁵⁵/	𢯭手 /tʰen⁵³⁻⁵⁵ su³¹/ 幫忙 /pɔŋ⁴⁴⁻³⁵ mɔŋ¹¹/	tolong	to help	
/jam¹¹.ban²⁴/	廁所 /sa³¹.so³¹/	jamban	restroom	
/luŋ¹¹.pit⁵/	荷包 /ho¹¹.pau̯²⁴/	dompet	wallet	
/so¹¹.toŋ⁵/	魷魚 /iu¹¹.n̩¹¹/	sotong	squid	
/lo¹¹.ti⁵⁵/	麵包 /mi̯en⁵².pau̯⁴⁴/	roti	bread	
/ʒa¹¹.boŋ²⁴/	包粟 /pau⁴⁴⁻³⁵.siʊk̚¹/	jagung	corn	
/to²⁴.mat⁵/	番茄 /fan⁴⁴⁻³⁵.kʰio¹¹/	tomat	tomato	

=== Sample words and sentence ===
Below are some examples of commonly used Pontianak Hakka words and sentences:

==== Quantifier ====
Pontianak Hakka	IPA pronunciations	Definition
零	/kʰuŋ²⁴/	zero
一	/ʒit²/	one
二	/ŋi⁵⁵/	two
兩	/lioŋ³¹/	two
三	/sam²⁴/	three
四	/si⁵⁵/	four
五	/ŋ̍³¹/	five
六	/liuk²/	six
七	/t͡sʰit²/	seven
八	/pat²/	eight
九	/kiu³¹/	nine
十	/ʃip⁵/	ten
百	/pak²/	hundred
千	/t͡sʰien²⁴/	thousand
萬	/ban²/	ten thousand
半	/pan⁵⁵/	half

==== Pronouns ====
Pontianak Hakka	IPA pronunciations	Definition
𠊎	/ŋai¹¹/	I
你	/ŋi¹¹/	you
佢	/ki¹¹/	he/she
𠊎兜	/ŋai¹¹.teu²⁴/	we
你兜	/ŋi¹¹.teu²⁴/	you all
佢兜	/ki¹¹.teu²⁴/	they
大家	/tʰai⁵⁵.ka²⁴/	everyone
自家	/t͡sʰit².ka²⁴/	myself
瞞儕	/man³¹.sa¹¹/	who
多少	/to⁵³.ʃau³¹/	how much
麼該	/ma².kai⁵⁵/	what
奈	/nai⁵⁵/	where
幾時	/kit².ʃi¹¹/	when
做麼該	/tso⁵⁵.ma².kai⁵⁵/	why
奈隻	/nai⁵⁵.t͡ʃak²/	which
樣般	/ŋioŋ⁵⁵.pan²⁴/	how
裡	/lia³¹/	here
該	/kai⁵⁵/	there
這隻	/lia³¹.t͡ʃak²/	this
該隻	/kai⁵⁵.t͡ʃak²/	that
這兜	/lia³¹.teu²⁴/	these
該兜	/kai⁵⁵.teu²⁴/	those
恁樣	/an³¹.ŋioŋ¹¹/	like this
該樣	/kai⁵⁵.ŋioŋ¹¹/	like that

==== Nouns ====
Pontianak Hakka	IPA pronunciations	Definition
春	/t͡sʰun²⁴/	egg
麵	/mien⁵⁵/	noodle
飯	/fan⁵⁵/	rice
蘋果	/piŋ¹¹.ko³¹/	apple
牛乳	/ŋiu¹¹.nen⁵⁵/	milk
黃梨	/boŋ¹¹.li¹¹/	pineapple
木瓜	/muk².ka²⁴/	papaya
狗	/keu³¹/	dog
馬	/ma²⁴/	horse
白兔	/pʰak⁵.tʰu⁵⁵/	rabbit
蝲䗁	/la¹¹.kʰia¹¹/	spider
屋	/buk²/	house
橋	/kʰiau¹¹/	bridge
目珠	/muk².t͡ʃu²⁴/	eye
鼻空	/pʰi⁵⁵.kuŋ²⁴/	nose
耳公	/ŋi³¹.kuŋ²⁴/	ear
嘴	/t͡ʃoi⁵⁵/	mouth
身體	/ʃin²⁴.tʰi³¹/	body
衫	/sam²⁴/	shirt
耳彎	/ŋi³¹.van¹¹/	earrings
耳彎	/ŋi³¹.ban¹¹/	earrings
高山	/ko²⁴.san²⁴/	mountain
海脣	/hoi³¹.ʃun¹¹/	beach
日頭	/ŋit².tʰeu¹¹/	sun
月光	/ŋiet⁵.koŋ²⁴/	moon
星	/sen²⁴/	star
天時	/tʰien²⁴.ʃi¹¹/	weather
天氣	/tʰien²⁴.hi⁵⁵/	weather
地方	/tʰi⁵⁵.foŋ²⁴/	place
大水	/tʰai⁵⁵.ʃui³¹/	rain

==== Verbs ====
Pontianak Hakka	IPA pronunciations	Definition
看	/kʰon⁵⁵/	to see
笑	/siau⁵⁵/	to laugh
嗷	/kiau⁵⁵/	to cry
跌	/tiet²/	to fall
企	/kʰi²⁴/	to stand
坐	/t͡sʰo²⁴/	to sit
行	/haŋ¹¹/	to walk
走	/tseu³¹/	to run
踏	/tʰap⁵/	to step
喊	/hem²⁴/	to call
喊	/ham⁵⁵/	to call
食	/t͡sʰit⁵/	to eat
食	/t͡sʰit⁵/	to drink
駛車	/si³¹.t͡ʃʰa²⁴/	to drive a vehicle
爽	/soŋ³¹/	to waste
歇睏	/hiet.kʰun⁵⁵/	to rest
休息	/siu²⁴.sip²/	to rest
泅水	/t͡sʰiu¹¹.ʃui³¹/	to swim
洗涼	/se³¹.lioŋ¹¹/	to shower
講話	/koŋ³¹.fa⁵⁵/	to speak
聽	/tʰaŋ²⁴/	to listen
睡目	/ʃoi⁵⁵.muk²/	to sleep
發夢	/pot².muŋ⁵⁵/	to dream
轉屋下	/t͡ʃon³¹.buk².kʰa²⁴/	to go home
搞	/kau³¹/	to play
告斥	/kau⁵⁵.t͡sʰi⁵⁵/	to warn
記得	/ki⁵⁵.tet²/	to remember
希望	/hi²⁴.moŋ⁵⁵/	to hope
試看	/t͡sʰi⁵⁵.kʰon⁵⁵/	to try
商量	/ʃon²⁴.lioŋ¹¹/	to discuss
打嘴古	/ta³¹.t͡ʃoi⁵⁵.ku³¹/	to chat
行街	/haŋ¹¹.kie²⁴/	to stroll
得到	/tet².to³¹/	to get

==== Adjectives ====
Pontianak Hakka	IPA pronunciations	Definition
肥	/pui¹¹/	fat
淰	/nem²⁴/	full
好	/ho³¹/	good
甜	/tʰiam¹¹/	sweet
鹹	/ham¹¹/	salty
酸	/son²⁴/	sour
苦	/fu³¹/	bitter
辣	/lat⁵/	spicy
闊	/fat²/	wide
深	/t͡ʃʰim²⁴/	deep
淺	/t͡sʰien³¹/	shallow
狹	/hap⁵/	narrow
擔心	/tam²⁴.sim²⁴/	anxious
熟悉	/ʃuk⁵.si⁵⁵/	familiar
發關	/pot².a²/	angry
歡喜	/fon²⁴.hi³¹/	happy
緊張	/kin³¹.t͡soŋ²⁴/	nervous
聰明	/t͡sʰuŋ²⁴.miŋ¹¹/	smart
簡單	/kien³¹.tan²⁴/	easy
方便	/foŋ²⁴.pʰien⁵⁵/	convenient
多工	/to²⁴.kuŋ²⁴/	tedious
恁多成事	/an³¹.to²⁴.ʃaŋ¹¹.ʃe⁵⁵/	tedious
靚	/t͡siaŋ²⁴/	pretty
伶俐	/laŋ¹¹.li⁵⁵/	clean
恬靜	/tiam²⁴.t͡sʰin⁵⁵/	quiet
驚怕	/kiaŋ²⁴.pʰa⁵⁵/	scary
爛	/lan⁵⁵/	broken
嚴重	/ŋiam¹¹.t͡ʃʰuŋ⁵⁵/	serious

==== Sample sentences ====
Pontianak Hakka	IPA pronunciations	Definition
你差𠊎無幾多。	/ŋi¹¹ tsaŋ²⁴ ŋai¹¹ mo¹¹ kit².to²⁴/	You're not much different from me.
這東西分你。	/lia³¹ tuŋ²⁴.si²⁴ pun²⁴ ŋi¹¹/	This thing is for you.
𠊎劏該隻雞。	/ŋai¹¹ tʰoŋ¹¹ kai⁵⁵.t͡ʃak² kie²⁴/	I killed the chicken.
樣般會恁樣？	/ŋioŋ⁵⁵.pan²⁴ boi⁵⁵ an³¹.ŋioŋ¹¹/	How could this happen?
你奈位歇？	/ŋi¹¹ nai⁵⁵ buii⁵⁵.het²/	Where do you live?
你尋瞞儕？	/ŋi¹¹ t͡sʰim¹ man³¹.sa¹¹/	Who are you looking for?
佢分𠊎打。	/ki¹¹ pun²⁴ ŋai¹¹ ta³¹/	He was beaten by me.

== See also ==
- Singkawang Hakka
- Hakka people
- Hakka culture
- Hailu dialect
- Taiwanese Hakka
- Sixian dialect
- Meixian dialect
- Pontianak Teochew

== Bibliography ==
- Huang, Su-chen (2013). 印尼坤甸客家話研究 [Study of Hakka in Pontianak, Indonesia] (PDF) (Master's thesis) (in Chinese (Taiwan)). National Central University.
