= Singkawang Hakka =

Variety of Hakka Chinese spoken in Indonesia

- Bahasa Khek Singkawang
- 山口洋客語; Sân-gú-yòng Hak-ngî (Pha̍k-fa-sṳ)
- Pronunciation: /san⁵³.kʰeu²⁴⁻²².i̯oŋ⁵⁵.hak³⁴.ŋi⁵³/
- Native to: Indonesia (West Kalimantan)
- Region: Singkawang, Pemangkat and Sambas
- Ethnicity: Singkawang Chinese
- Native speakers: 103,449 (2012) (Note: Only in Singkawang city proper.)
- Language family: Sino-Tibetan: Sinitic; Chinese; Hakka; Hailu dialect; Singkawang Hakka
- Writing system: Latin script: Indonesian alphabet (most common); Pha̍k-fa-sṳ (sporadic); Chinese characters

Language codes
- ISO 639-3: –
- IETF: hak-ID
- Regencies and cities in West Kalimantan where Singkawang Hakka is spoken by the majority of the population Regencies and cities in West Kalimantan where Singkawang Hakka is spoken by a significant minority of the population

Singkawang Hakka (Chinese: 山口洋客語; Pha̍k-fa-sṳ: Sân-gú-yòng Hak-ngî; Indonesian: Bahasa Khek Singkawang) is a variety of Hakka predominantly spoken by the Hakka Chinese community in the northwestern part of West Kalimantan, Indonesia, particularly in and around the Singkawang region. It originates from the Hakka dialects spoken in Guangdong, China, though it has evolved with some differences influenced by local influences. Singkawang Hakka differs from Pontianak Hakka, which is rooted in the Meixian dialect. In contrast, Singkawang Hakka is based on the Hailu dialect, with significant influence from Hopo and Wuhua dialects. Singkawang Hakka is colloquially known as yinghua (硬話) 'hard speech' among the local Chinese community. In contrast, Pontianak Hakka, spoken in areas south of Bengkayang, including Pontianak, Mempawah Regency, and Kubu Raya Regency, is commonly referred to as ruanhua (軟話) 'soft speech'. Today, Singkawang Hakka has a wide geographical spread. Besides being used in Singkawang, Pemangkat, and Sambas, it is also commonly spoken among the Chinese migrants from Singkawang in Jakarta.

Hakka is the predominant language spoken among the Chinese communities in Singkawang, although there are also small Teochew-speaking communities present. Additionally, many Hakka in Singkawang are multilingual, fluent in Mandarin, Indonesian, and the local Malay dialect. Code-switching and code-mixing are common among the Singkawang Chinese, who frequently alternate between Hakka, Malay, and standard Indonesian. This is especially prevalent in informal settings, such as local markets, where people from various ethnic backgrounds interact. Additionally, since the majority of Singkawang's population is Hakka, many non-Chinese residents in the area are also able to speak and understand Hakka.

== History ==
Singkawang Hakka
- Traditional Chinese: 山口洋客語
- Simplified Chinese: 山口洋客语
Transcriptions
Standard Mandarin
- Hanyu Pinyin: Shānkǒu yáng kè yǔ
Hakka
- Pha̍k-fa-sṳ: Sân-gú-yòng Hak-ngî

The Hakkas began migrating to the coastal regions of western Borneo in the 17th century. While the majority originated from the interior of Guangdong (specifically areas around Meizhou, Huizhou, Jieyang, and other areas), a smaller number came from Tingzhou in western Fujian. These immigrants brought their language and culture with them. By the late 19th century, there were already immigrants in the Singkawang region of West Kalimantan speaking Hailu Hakka. Additionally, Hopo immigrants from Jiexi had been documented in West Kalimantan as early as the late 18th century. The Hakka dialect spoken in Singkawang today is likely the result of a historical blending of the Hailu and Hopo dialects, which has endowed it with the distinct characteristics of both varieties.

From the late Qing dynasty to the early establishment of the Republic of China, wars and chaos were frequent in mainland China. As a result, many Hakka people, to avoid military conscription and forced labor or to earn a living, were forced to follow shuike (水客, suihak), brokers who specifically brought people to Southeast Asia, to Malaya or Bangka-Belitung, where they became contract laborers in tin mines. After their contracts ended, many workers moved to the region under the rule of the Sultan of Sambas, particularly to Singkawang and its surroundings, to seek a new life. At that time, a large group of Hopo immigrants arrived and rented land from the local government for farming. Those with skills or relatives in Singkawang chose to settle and engage in small businesses there, selling cakes or working as laborers. By that time, there were already many traditional medicine shops, bookstores, barbershops, and others. Because many small stalls in the rural areas were owned by Hakka people, to facilitate transactions and blend in with the grassroots community, the tycoons of Singkawang, whether Teochew or Hokkien, were inevitably compelled to learn Hakka. Thus, Hakka became the lingua franca in Singkawang, while Teochew and Hokkien are only spoken at home.

Most of the Hakkas who migrated to present-day Singkawang came from impoverished backgrounds and were invited by the Sultanate of Sambas to work as miners. They formed kongsis (associations) for business purposes, particularly in gold mining, in the interior regions of West Kalimantan. One of the most well-known kongsis in West Kalimantan was the Lanfang Kongsi. Its founder was Luo Fangbo, in the 18th century. He not only succeeded in establishing kongsis but also became the governor for the Chinese community in West Kalimantan, headquartered in Mandor (about 100 km from Pontianak). During that time, Monterado and Mandor were well-known as centers of gold mining, attracting Chinese people from various ethnic groups. Singkawang, on the other hand, served merely as a trade city and not as a resource-producing area like Monterado and Mandor.

The "Red Bowl" incident (Indonesian: Mangkok Merah) that occurred at the end of 1967 saw the Indonesian government expelling hundreds of thousands of Hakka Chinese from rural areas, so 99% of this Hakka-speaking exodus group was forced to settle in Singkawang and its surrounding areas. Before the government prohibited Chinese people from entering Indonesia in 1949, new arrivals from the Teochew and Hokkien-speaking communities were almost nonexistent. However, Hakka speakers arrived in large numbers, around 10–20 thousand people, thus increasing the Hakka population in Singkawang. As time passed, the first generation of Teochew, Hokkien, and Hakka speakers became increasingly rare. They were mostly elderly and rarely gathered together, so communication in their native languages became less frequent. Meanwhile, the second generation, although they initially mastered their mother tongue, found themselves communicating with Hakka in daily life and social interactions.

== Geographical distribution and usage ==
The Hakka language in West Kalimantan is divided into two types: the Pontianak Hakka, which is more related to the Meixian Hakka dialect, and Singkawang Hakka, which is more related to the Lufeng (Hailu) Hakka dialect. These two varieties differ slightly in tone, vocabulary, and pronunciation. The areas that use the Meixian Hakka dialect include Pontianak, Sekadau, Sintang, Sanggau, and Mempawah. Meanwhile, the areas that use the Lufeng Hakka accent include Singkawang, Sungai Duri, Sambas, and Pemangkat. In areas with a significant Hakka population, non-Chinese residents also understand and speak Singkawang Hakka. Many Malays, Dayak, and even Javanese residents are proficient in Hakka and actively use it to communicate with the Chinese community. Meanwhile, many elderly Chinese residents are either unable to speak or are less fluent in languages other than Hakka. Today, Singkawang Hakka is spoken widely beyond Singkawang, Pemangkat, and Sambas, extending to the Chinese business community in Jakarta, specifically in western Jakarta, where many migrants from Singkawang have settled.

Hakka is widely spoken throughout Singkawang, with estimates suggesting that over 60% of the local population use it in their daily conversations. Many Chinese in Singkawang, in addition to Hakka, are also fluent in Sambas Malay, the local Malay dialect. Code-switching or code-mixing between Hakka and Sambas Malay is very common, particularly when conversing with non-Chinese individuals. In addition, most elders in Singkawang could speak both Hakka and Mandarin, as they learned the latter when educated in Chinese language schools before they were closed during the New Order. Few also spoke Teochew or other Chinese dialects. Currently, following the lifting of the ban on learning Chinese, many young people have enrolled in Chinese schools where they are taught to speak and read Mandarin. Most Chinese residents, especially the younger generations are also fluent in standard Indonesian, the national language. The usage of Indonesian is typically limited to formal settings, such as government interactions or educational environments, where formal Indonesian is preferred. Nonetheless, there is currently a growing trend in the use of the Hakka in official communications in Singkawang. Mayors and government officials frequently incorporate Hakka in various official functions, including meetings, public addresses, and interactions with the local community.

There is a slight difference in the Hakka dialects spoken in Singkawang city proper, Sambas, Pemangkat, and Bengkayang, primarily in their phonological features and pronunciations.

== Phonology ==
=== Consonants ===
The Singkawang Hakka dialect has 21 initials, including one zero initial [∅]. The list is as follows:

Singkawang Hakka initials
		Labial		Alveolar		Postalveolar	Velar	Glottal
		Labial		Apical	Laminal	Postalveolar	Velar	Glottal
		Bilabial	Labiodental	Apical	Laminal	Postalveolar	Velar	Glottal
Nasal		[m] 門 (mun⁵⁵)			[n] 難 (nan⁵⁵)		[ŋ] 牙 (ŋa⁵)	
Plosive/ Affricate	plain	[p] 布 (pu³¹)		[t͡s] 精 (t͡sin⁵³)	[t] 等 (ten²⁴)	[t͡ʃ] 主 (t͡ʃu²⁴)	[k] 貴 (kui³¹)	
Plosive/ Affricate	aspirated	[pʰ] 盤 (pʰan⁵⁵)		[t͡sʰ] 趣 (t͡sʰi³¹)	[tʰ] 同 (tʰuŋ⁵⁵)	[t͡ʃʰ] 重 (t͡ʃʰuŋ⁵³)	[kʰ] 開 (kʰoi⁵³)	
Plosive/ Affricate	voiced	[b] 武 (bu²⁴)						
Fricative	voiceless		[f] 紅 (fuŋ⁵⁵)	[s] 線 (sien³¹)		[ʃ] 水 (ʃui²⁴)		[h] 去 (hi³¹)
Fricative	voiced					[ʒ] 雲 (ʒiun⁵⁵)		
Lateral					[l] 連 (lien⁵⁵)			

Notes:

- The zero initial, like in 鴨 (IPA: /ap³⁴/), is not listed in the table above.

=== Rhymes ===
Singkawang Hakka features five vowel phonemes: i, e, a, o, and u. Additionally, it includes one medial i, three open nasal codas (-m, -n, -ŋ), and three checked codas (-p, -t, -k). This yields eight open finals, seven vocalic finals, twenty nasal finals, seventeen stop finals, and two syllabic nasals. In total, there are 54 rimes.

==== Pure vowels ====
	Front	Central	Back
Close	[i] 第 (tʰi²⁴)		[u] 故 (ku³¹)
Mid	[e] 姐 (t͡se⁵⁵)		[o] 老 (lo²⁴)
Open	[a] 爬 (pa⁵⁵)		

==== Diphthongs and triphthongs ====
Diphthongs			Triphthongs
ia 寫 (sia²⁴)	iu 有 (ʒiu⁵³)	oi 灰 (foi⁵³)	iau 橋 (kʰiau⁵⁵)
io 茄 (kʰio⁵)	ai 大 (tʰai²⁴)	ui 跪 (kʰui²⁴)	iau 橋 (kʰiau⁵⁵)
ie 蟻 (ŋie³¹)	au 爪 (t͡sau²⁴)	eu 後 (heu²⁴)	iau 橋 (kʰiau⁵⁵)

==== Syllabic consonants ====
	Bilabial	Velar
Nasal	[m̩] 毋 (m̩⁵⁵)	[ŋ̍] 魚 (ŋ̍⁵⁵)

==== Nuclei with nasal codas ====
-m	am 減 (kam²⁴)	em 揞 (em⁵³)	im 金 (kim⁵³)	iam 添 (tʰiam⁵³)	iem 弇 (kiem⁵³)				
-n	an 山 (san⁵³)	en 朋 (pʰen⁵⁵)	in 新 (sin⁵³)	ian 遠 (ʒian²⁴)	ien 見 (kien³¹)	ion 軟 (ŋion⁵³)	iun 軍 (kiun⁵³)	on 肝 (kon⁵³)	un 粉 (fun²⁴)
-ŋ	aŋ 硬 (ŋaŋ²⁴)			iaŋ 平 (pʰiaŋ⁵⁵)		ioŋ 香 (hioŋ⁵³)	iuŋ 胸 (hiuŋ⁵³)	oŋ 講 (koŋ²⁴)	uŋ 東 (tuŋ⁵³)

==== Checked rhymes ====
-p	ap 胛 (kap³⁴)	ep 澀 (sep³⁴)	ip 汁 (t͡ʃip³⁴)	iap 帖 (tʰiap³⁴)					
-t	at 舌 (ʃat⁵)	et 蝨 (set³⁴)	it 日 (ŋit³⁴)	iat 越 (ʒiat⁵)	iet 節 (t͡siet³⁴)			ot 刷 (sot³⁴)	ut 骨 (kut³⁴)
-k	ak 隻 (t͡ʃak³⁴)			iak 錫 (siak³⁴)		iok 腳 (kiok³⁴)	iuk 玉 (ŋiuk⁵)	ok 索 (sok³⁴)	uk 屋 (buk³⁴)

=== Tones ===
In Singkawang Hakka, there are a total of six tones. The tones and their characteristics are shown in the table below:

	Upper/Dark (陰)					Lower/Light (陽)				
	No.	Name	Contour	Sandhied	Examples	No.	Name	Contour	Sandhied	Examples
Level (平)	1	陰平 yim-pin	[˥˧] (53)	[˧] (33)	抽 [t͡ʃʰu˥˧], 豬 [t͡ʃu˥˧]	2	陽平 yong-pin	[˥˥] (55)	[˧] (33)	才 [t͡soi˥], 人 [ŋin˥]
Rising (上)	36	上聲 song-sang	[˨˦] (24)	[˨] (22)	助 [t͡su˨˦], 好 [ho˨˦]	-				
Departing (去)	5	陰去 yim-hi	[˧˩] (31)	[˧˩] (31)	唱 [t͡soŋ˧˩], 菜 [t͡ʃoi˧˩]	-				
Entering (入)	7	陰入 yim-ngip	[˧˦] (34)	[˨] (3)	竹 [t͡ʃuk˧˦], 桌 [t͡sok˧˦]	8	陽入 yong-ngip	[˥] (5)	[˥] (5)	局 [kʰiuk˥], 白 [pʰak˥]

==== Tone sandhi ====
The pronunciation of a single character is referred to as the base tone (本調). However, when two or more characters are combined, tone changes occur, resulting in what is called tone sandhi (變調). Tone sandhi can be categorized into two-character consecutive tone sandhi and tone sandhi involving three or more characters. For example, the word /kieu˨²⁴/ (狗) 'dog' is pronounced with a rising tone [˨˦] (24). However, when combined with another syllable, such as /ŋiuk⁵/ (肉) 'meat', it becomes /kieu²⁴⁻²².ŋiuk⁵/ (狗肉) 'dog meat', where the original word is now pronounced with a low tone [˨] (22). Another example is the word /t͡ʃuk˧˦/ (竹) 'bamboo', which is pronounced with a high checked tone [˧˦] (34) when it stands alone. However, when combined with another word, such as /ʒiap⁵/ (葉) 'leaf', it becomes /t͡ʃuk³⁴⁻³.ʒiap⁵/ (竹葉) 'bamboo leaf', where the original word is now pronounced with a mid-level tone [˧] (3).

The combinations of tone sandhi in Singkawang Hakka can be summarized in the following rules:

- Tone [˥˧] 53 (yingping) and tone [˥˥] 55 (yangping) change to tone [˧] 33 when followed by any syllables, except for tone [˧˩] 31 (yinqu), tone [˧˦] 34 (yinru), or tone [˥] 5 (yangru), where no change occurs.
- Tone [˨˦] 24 (shangsheng) always changes to tone [˨] 22 regardless of the tone of the following syllables.
- Tone [˧˩] 31 (yinqu) and tone [˥] 5 (yangru) do not undergo tone sandhi.
- Tone [˧˦] 34 (yinru) changes to tone [˧] 3 when followed by any syllables.

== Differences from other Hakka dialects ==
Singkawang Hakka mainly shares similarities in phonology, rhyme, and tone with Hailu Hakka as spoken in mainland China and Taiwan. However, it also exhibits several notable differences that set it apart, due to influences from other Hakka dialects as well as other languages.

=== Phonological aspects ===
- Singkawang Hakka preserves many of the consonant features of Middle Chinese. In contrast, the Meixian and Sixian dialects have undergone a retroflex stage, while the Wuhua dialect is in the process of change.
- Some sounds in Singkawang Hakka are pronounced with an aspirated velar stop (/kʰ-/), such as in words like "吸" ("inhale"), "霍" ("sudden"), "藿" ("herb"), "況" ("situation"), "潰" ("collapse"), "狹" ("narrow"), and "核" ("kernel"). In the Meixian, Sixian, and Hailu dialects, these sounds have shifted to /h-/ or /f-/, likely under the influence of Cantonese.
- The b initial is rare in other Hakka dialects but is widespread in Singkawang Hakka, where the v initial has completely transformed into b. This change may also be influenced by Indonesian, and a similar shift can be seen in the Yunlin Hakka dialect in Taiwan, influenced by Taiwanese Hokkien.
- Words like "徙" ("to migrate") retain the older "-ai" ending, while others have shifted to the front tongue vowel "-i," resulting in a contrast between the two forms (-ai and -i). This distinction is absent in Meixian and Sixian dialects, where the finals have shifted to more centralized vowels due to changes in the initial consonants.
- The contrast between "-o" and "-a" in specific tone categories remains intact in Singkawang Hakka. For example, words like "果" ("fruit") and "假" ("fake") clearly demonstrate this contrast. While some influence from the Meixian dialect has caused partial merging of tones, the distinction remains clear.
- In Singkawang Hakka, the u medial, which is typically preserved in Hakka, exhibits a unique pattern. For example, in words where the u medial is often lost after labial consonants in other dialects, Singkawang Hakka retains it. However, after velar consonants, the u medial has disappeared, resulting in a more open vowel sound.

=== Tones ===
The majority of the Hakka people in Singkawang come from Hopo in Jiexi. This tonal system, which is used by most people, consists of six tones: yinping (陰平), yangping (陽平), shangsheng (上聲), yinqu (陰去), yinru (陰入), and yangru (陽入). The most distinctive feature in Singkawang Hakka's tonal system is that the yangqu tone (陽去) is categorized as a shangsheng tone, which is different from Meixian Hakka, where all voiceless tones revert to the departing tone. As a result, the range of the shangsheng tone is broader. Additionally, Meixian Hakka speakers still retain the yangqu tone with a tonal value of 22 in a small number of cases, which is closer to the tonal system of Luhe Hakka. Below is a comparative table of the tones in various Hakka dialects:

	Yinping (陰平)	Yangping (陽平)	Shangsheng (上聲)	Yinqu (陰去)	Yangqu (陽去)	Yinru (陰入)	Yangru (陽入)
Singkawang	[˥˧] 53	[˥˥] 55	[˨˦] 24	[˧˩] 31	[˨˦] (24)	[˧˦] 34	[˥] 5
Jiexi	[˥˧] 53	[˨˦] 24	[˨˩] 21	[˥˧] 42	–	[˩] 2	[˥] 5
Xiuzhuan	[˩˧] 13	[˥˦] 54	[˥˩] 51		[˧] 33	[˨˦] 24	[˧] 3
Wuhua	[˦] 44	[˩˧] 13	[˧˩] 31	[˥˧] 53	[˧˩] (31)	[˩] 1	[˥] 5
Meixian	[˦] 44	[˩] 11	[˧˩] 31	[˥˧] 52		[˩] 1	[˥] 5
Sixian	[˨˦] 24	[˩] 11	[˧˩] 31	[˥˥] 55		[˨˩] 21	[˥] 5
Hailu	[˥˧] 53	[˥˥] 55	[˩˧] 13	[˩] 11	[˧] 33	[˥] 5	[˨˩] 21
Yunlin	[˩] 11	[˥˧] 53	[˧˩] 31		[˥˥] 55	[˨˦] 24	[˩˨] 32
Luhe	[˥˧] 53	[˥˥] 55	[˨˩˧] 213	[˧˩] 31	[˨] 22	[˧˦] 34	[˥˦] 54

=== Vocabulary ===
Due to the close contact between the Singkawang Hakka and Indonesian, and the forced education in Indonesian for the local Chinese population after the 1960s, the vocabulary of Singkawang Hakka has been influenced by many local Indonesian words, making it significantly different from the Hakka dialects spoken in mainland China and Taiwan. As early as the 17th and 18th centuries, the Hakka people began to form a large presence in Borneo and started cultivating land there. With frequent interactions between the Hakka people and the local dialect of Malays, linguistic and cultural exchanges were inevitable. Many words were directly translated or borrowed from Malay, and also Indonesian which is a variety of Malay. Due to the long history of borrowing, Singkawang Hakka speakers now regards these words as part of the Hakka language, creating the unique expressions found in the region today. Additionally, due to progress and development, many new things emerged and were given different names, contributing to the unique terms in the Singkawang Hakka. In general, the vocabulary of Singkawang Hakka is highly localized. Some terms are only heard locally, while not used in mainland China or Taiwan's Hakka-speaking areas, or they are used with different meanings in other Hakka-speaking regions.

One notable characteristic of the Hakka dialect in Singkawang is its influence from both Teochew, one of the largest Chinese varieties spoken in West Kalimantan after Hakka, and Indonesian, the national language. For example, in daily life, Singkawang Hakka has incorporated several Teochew words. For instance, the word for "fatigue" is pronounced /kʰoi˥/ in Sixian Hakka and /tʰiam˨˦/ in Hailu Hakka, but in Singkawang, it is pronounced /ho˥t/, borrowed from Teochew /hek˥/. Similarly, Indonesian has contributed loanwords, such as "potato," which is pronounced /ma˥˧.lin˩.su˩/ in Sixian Hakka and /ma˥˧.lin˥.su˥/ in Hailu Hakka, but /kan˥.tang˥˧/ in Singkawang, derived from the Indonesian word kentang. There are also several borrowed words from Cantonese, such as /tʰoŋ˥˧/ meaning "to slaughter," which is derived from the Cantonese word 劏 /tʰɔŋ˥˧/. This phenomenon of lexical borrowing is increasingly prevalent in Indonesian Hakka-speaking communities.

== Lexicon ==
The lexicon of Singkawang Hakka is predominantly derived from Hailu Hakka, but it has also incorporated loanwords from other Hakka dialects, as well as from Teochew, Cantonese, and Indonesian.

=== Loanwords ===
==== Meixian Hakka ====
Since some of the Hakka people in Singkawang are descendants of immigrants from Meixian in mainland China, Singkawang Hakka has absorbed certain loanwords from Meixian Hakka, although the pronunciation has been influenced by Hailu Hakka. Nevertheless, Singkawang Hakka still retains many vocabulary features of Meixian Hakka to this day. Below are some examples of loanwords in Singkawang Hakka that are absorbed from Meixian Hakka:

Singkawang Hakka	Hailu Hakka	Meixian Hakka	Definition	Note
地 /tʰi²⁴/	風水 /fuŋ⁵³.ʃui²⁴/	地 /tʰi⁵²/	tomb	
肚飢 /tu²⁴⁻²².ki⁵³/	肚枵 /tu³³.iau⁵³/	肚飢 /tu³¹.ki⁴⁴/	hungry	
火蛇 /fo²².ʃa⁵⁵/	𥍉爧 /ŋiap².laŋ³³/	火蛇 /fo³¹.sa¹¹/	lightning	
吊菜 /tiau³¹.tsʰoi³¹/	茄 /kʰio⁵⁵/	吊菜 /tiau⁵³.tsʰoi⁵³/	eggplant	
快菜 /kʰai³¹.tsʰoi³¹/	韮菜 /kiu¹¹.tsʰo¹¹˩/	快菜 /kʰuai⁵³.tsʰoi⁵³/	chinese leek	
老蟹 /lo²².hai²⁴/	毛蟹 /mo⁵³.hai²⁴/	老蟹 /lau⁵².hai³¹/	crab	
簷蛇 /ʒiam⁵⁵.ʃa⁵⁵/	壁蛇 /piak².ʃa⁵⁵/	簷蛇 /iam¹¹.sa¹¹/	gecko	
油炸粿 /ʒiu⁵⁵.tsa³¹.ke⁵³/	油條 /ʒiu⁵⁵.tʰiau⁵⁵/	油炸粿 /iu¹¹.tsa⁵³.kui³¹/	youtiao	In Meixian Hakka, youtiao "油條" is called "油炸粿", a term that likely originated from Min languages. However, in Hailu Hakka, it is still referred to as "油條" rather than "油炸粿".
甜酒 /tʰiam⁵⁵.tsiu²⁴/	酸醋 /son⁵³.sɿ¹¹/	酸醋 /son⁴⁴.tsʰɿ⁵³/	vinegar	"甜酒" is the common term for vinegar, and the term "酸醋" is rarely used, though it is still understood.
甜酒 /tʰiam⁵⁵.tsiu²⁴/	酸醋 /son⁵³.sɿ¹¹/	甜酒 /tʰiam¹¹.tsiu³¹/	vinegar	"甜酒" is the common term for vinegar, and the term "酸醋" is rarely used, though it is still understood.
拖格 /tʰo⁵³.kak³⁴/	拖箱 /tʰo⁵³.sioŋ⁵³/	拖格 /tʰo⁴⁴.kak¹/	drawer	
燙斗 /tʰoŋ³¹.teu²⁴/	熨斗 /ʒiun¹¹.teu²⁴/	燙斗 /tʰoŋ⁵³.teu³¹/	clothes iron	

==== Teochew ====
Due to the close proximity between the Chaoshan region and Hakka-speaking areas, frequent interactions between the two populations have facilitated the use of Teochew in eastern Guangdong. The Hakka communities in Haifeng, Lufeng, Jiexi, and Raoping have been notably impacted by contact with Teochew, leading to the adoption of several loanwords into their language. In West Kalimantan, both Hakka and Teochew are prominent languages within the Chinese community. Consequently, West Kalimantan Hakka has significantly absorbed loanwords from Teochew. Below are examples of Teochew loanwords that have been incorporated into Singkawang Hakka:

Singkawang Hakka	Hailu Hakka	Teochew	Definition	Note
渴 /hot⁵/	悿 /tʰiam²⁴/	乏 /hek⁵/	tired	
猛 /maŋ⁵³/	遽 /kiak⁵/	猛 /men⁵³/	fast	
笑禮 /siau³¹.li⁵³/	見笑 /kien¹¹.siau¹¹/	笑禮 /siao³⁵.li³⁵/	shy	
薟椒 /hiam³³.tsiau⁵³/	辣椒 /lat¹¹.tsiau⁵³/	薟椒 /hiam²².t͡sio⁴⁴/	chili	
豉油 /ʃi³¹.ʒiu⁵⁵/	豆油 /tʰeu³³.iu⁵/	豉油 /si¹².iu⁵⁵/	soy sauce	
豆油 /tʰeu²².ʒiu⁵⁵/	豆油 /tʰeu³³.iu⁵/	豉油 /si¹².iu⁵⁵/	soy sauce	
果子 /ko³¹.tsi³¹/	水果 /sui⁵³.ko⁵³/	果子 /kuen³⁵-tsi⁵³/	fruit	
檨 /sai/	番檨 /fan²⁴.son⁵/	檨 /suai¹¹/	mango	
檨 /sai/	酸仔 /son⁵³.er⁵/	檨 /suai¹¹/	mango	
正月半 /t͡ʃaŋ³¹.ŋiat⁵.pan³¹/	元宵節 /ian⁵.siau⁵³.tsiat⁵/	十五暝 /t͡sap̚⁴⁻².ŋou³⁵⁻¹¹.me⁵⁵/	Lantern Festival	正月半 is the most commonly used term for the Lantern Festival. While 十五暝, a term borrowed from Teochew and Hokkien, is rarely used, it remains widely understood.
十五暝 /t͡sap.ko.mei/	元宵節 /ian⁵.siau⁵³.tsiat⁵/	十五暝 /t͡sap̚⁴⁻².ŋou³⁵⁻¹¹.me⁵⁵/	Lantern Festival	正月半 is the most commonly used term for the Lantern Festival. While 十五暝, a term borrowed from Teochew and Hokkien, is rarely used, it remains widely understood.

==== Cantonese ====
A small number of words in Singkawang Hakka are directly borrowed from Cantonese. It is speculated that when the Singkawang Hakka people lived in their original homeland on the mainland, they frequently interacted with Cantonese-speaking people in Guangdong. Due to this linguistic contact, Cantonese influenced their speech, leading to the borrowing of some Cantonese vocabulary into their Hakka language. Below are examples of Cantonese loanwords that have been incorporated into Singkawang Hakka:

Singkawang Hakka	Hailu Hakka	Cantonese	Definition	Note
劏 /tʰoŋ⁵³/	㓾 /t͡ʃʰi⁵⁵/	劏 /tʰɔŋ⁵³/	murder	
雪 /siet³⁴/	冰 /pen⁵³/	雪 /sy:t³³/	ice	The word for "ice" in Singkawang Hakka is "雪" (suet), the same term used in Cantonese, which also means "snow". In Cantonese-speaking regions, where snowfall is uncommon, "雪" is used interchangeably to refer to both "ice" and "snow."

==== Indonesian ====
Due to the status of Indonesian as the national language, Singkawang Hakka speakers have incorporated several Indonesian words into their daily conversations. This borrowing primarily occurs due to the absence of equivalent terms in Hakka, or because of local objects and newly coined terms in Indonesia. As a result of ongoing language contact and interaction, the integration of Indonesian into Hakka is inevitable and increasingly common. Below is a list of Indonesian loanwords frequently used by locals in their everyday lives:

Singkawang Hakka	Hailu Hakka	Indonesian	Definition	Note
/si³¹.men⁵⁵/	紅毛泥 /fu⁵⁵.mo⁵³.nai⁵⁵/	semen	cement	
/kaŋ⁵/	巷仔 /hoŋ¹¹.ŋe⁵⁵/	gang	alley	
蕳砃 /kan⁵⁵.taŋ⁵³/	馬鈴薯 /ma⁵³.lin⁵.ʃu⁵⁵/	kentang	potato	
咖啡 /ko⁵⁵.pi⁵³/	咖啡 /ka⁵³.pi⁵³/	kopi	coffee	
/lo⁵⁵.ti⁵³/	麭 /pʰaŋ⁵³/	roti	bread	The Indonesian word roti has been directly borrowed into Hakka. Since Hakka does not have the /r/ sound, it is replaced with /l/.
/lo⁵⁵.ti⁵³/	麵包 /mien³³.pau⁵³/	roti	bread	The Indonesian word roti has been directly borrowed into Hakka. Since Hakka does not have the /r/ sound, it is replaced with /l/.
洞葛 /tuŋ³¹.kat⁵/	枴棍 /kuai³³.kun¹¹/	tongkat	stick	
巴撒 /pa⁵³.sak⁵/	市場 /ʃi¹¹.t͡ʃʰoŋ⁵⁵/	pasar	market	
鐳 /lui⁵³/	錢 /tsʰien⁵⁵/	duit	money	Singkawang Hakkas refer to money as lui, a term borrowed from the Indonesian/Malay word duit. In this borrowing, the initial d sound is replaced with l, resulting in the pronunciation lui. This usage is not unique to Singkawang Hakka but is also found in Southern Min, Hong Kong Hakka, Hainanese, and Malaysian Hakka dialects.
/u³³.taŋ⁵⁵/	賒數 /t͡ʃʰa⁵³.sɿ¹¹/	utang	debt	
/to⁵³.loŋ⁵⁵/	𢯭手 /tʰen¹¹.ʃiu²⁴/	tolong	to help	
/a²².nak⁵/	細人 /se¹¹.ŋin⁵⁵/	anak	child	
交人 /kau³¹.ŋin⁵⁵/	結婚 /kiet².fun⁵³/	kawin	to marry	Singkawang Hakkas use the terms 結婚 and 交人 to refer to marriage. The term 交人 is directly borrowed from the Indonesian word kawin. Locals frequently extend this usage by adding other words after 交, such as 交老公 (marry a husband), 交老婆 (marry a wife), or 交新娘 (marry a bride). This usage is quite common in their daily conversations.
/ba˨.loŋ⁵⁵/	雜貨店 /tsʰap¹¹.fo¹¹.tiam¹¹/	warung	general store	
/ka²⁴⁻²².loŋ⁵⁵.pau⁵³/	麻布袋 /ma⁵⁵.pu¹¹.tʰoi¹¹/	karung	sack	
/sa⁵³.la²²/	毋著 /m̩⁵⁵.tsʰok²/	salah	wrong	

=== Sample words and sentences ===
Below are some examples of commonly used Singkawang Hakka words and sentences:

==== Quantifier ====
Singkawang Hakka	IPA pronunciations	Definition
零	/kʰuŋ⁵³/	zero
一	/ʒit³⁴/	one
二	/ŋi²⁴/	two
兩	/lioŋ²⁴⁻²²/	two
三	/sam⁵³/	three
四	/si³¹/	four
五	/ŋ̍²⁴⁻²²/	five
六	/liuk³⁴⁻³/	six
七	/t͡sʰit³⁴⁻³/	seven
八	/pat³⁴/	eight
九	/kiu²⁴/	nine
十	/ʃip⁵/	ten
百	/pak³⁴/	hundred
千	/t͡sʰien⁵³/	thousand
萬	/ban³⁴/	ten thousand
半	/pan³¹/	half

==== Pronouns ====
Singkawang Hakka	IPA pronunciations	Definition
𠊎	/ŋai⁵⁵/	I
你	/ŋi⁵⁵/	you
佢	/ki⁵⁵/	he/she
𠊎兜儕	/ŋai⁵⁵.teu⁵³.sa⁵/	we
你兜儕	/ŋi⁵⁵.teu⁵³.sa⁵⁵/	you all
佢兜儕	/ki⁵⁵.teu⁵³.sa⁵⁵/	they
齊家	/t͡sʰe⁵⁵.ka⁵³/	everyone
自家	/t͡sʰit³⁴⁻³.ka⁵³/	myself
麼儕	/ma²⁴⁻²².sa⁵⁵/	who
幾多	/ki²⁴⁻²².to⁵³/	how much
麼介	/ma²⁴⁻²².kai³¹/	what
麼介時節	/ma²⁴⁻²².kai³¹.ʃi⁵.t͡siet³⁴/	when
幾時	/ki²⁴⁻²².ʃi⁵⁵/	when
阿位	/a²⁴⁻²².bui⁵⁵/	where
仰般	/ŋioŋ²⁴⁻²².pan⁵³/	how
阿俚	/a²⁴⁻²².li⁵⁵/	here
俚位	/li⁵⁵.bui²⁴/	here
阿該	/a²⁴⁻²².kai³¹/	there
該位	/kai³¹.bui²⁴/	there
這介	/li⁵⁵.kai³¹/	this
該介	/kai⁵⁵.kai³¹/	that
俚兜	/li²⁴⁻²².teu⁵³/	these
該兜	/kai⁵⁵.teu⁵³/	those
俚樣	/li²⁴⁻²².ʒioŋ²⁴/	like this
恁樣	/an⁵³.ʒioŋ²⁴/	like this
該樣	/kai⁵⁵.ioŋ²⁴/	like that

==== Nouns ====
Singkawang Hakka	IPA pronunciations	Definition
雞春	/kai⁵³.t͡sʰun⁵³/	egg
飯	/fon²⁴/	rice
麵	/mien²⁴/	noodle
糜	/moi⁵⁵/	congee
菜	/t͡sʰoi³¹/	vegetable
點心	/tiam²⁴⁻²².sim⁵³/	snacks
水	/ʃui²⁴/	water
飯店	/fon²⁴/.tiam²⁴⁻²²/	restaurant
味	/mui²⁴/	taste
鹽	/ʒiam⁵⁵/	salt
糖	/tʰoŋ⁵⁵/	sugar
衫褲	/sam⁵³.kʰu³¹/	clothes
褲	/kʰu³¹/	pants
手襪	/ʃiu²⁴⁻²².mat³⁴/	glove
目鏡	/muk³⁴⁻³.kiaŋ³¹/	glasses
鞋	/hai⁵⁵/	shoe
手錶	/ʃiu²⁴⁻²².piau⁵³/	watch
耳環	/ŋi²⁴⁻²².ban⁵⁵/	earring
膴身	/bu³³.ʃin⁵³/	body
頭顱	/tʰeu⁵.na⁵⁵/	head
面	/mien³¹/	face
目珠	/muk³⁴⁻³.t͡su⁵³/	eye
鼻空	/pʰi³¹.kʰuŋ⁵³/	nose
胸脯	/hiuŋ⁵³.pʰu⁵⁵/	chest
腳	/kiok³⁴/	foot
耳空	/ŋi²⁴⁻²².kʰuŋ⁵³/	ear
肚子	/tu²⁴⁻²².ʃi²⁴/	stomach

==== Verbs ====
Singkawang Hakka	IPA pronunciations	Definition
食飯	/ʃit³⁴⁻³.fon²⁴/	to eat
煮飯	/t͡su³³.fon²⁴/	to cook
搞	/kau²⁴/	to play
嫽	/liau²⁴/	to chat
洗涼	/se²⁴⁻²².lioŋ⁵⁵/	to shower
食煙	/ʃit³⁴⁻³.ʒian⁵³/	to smoke
燒煙	/ʃau³³.ʒian⁵³/	to smoke
刷牙	/sot³⁴⁻³.ŋa⁵⁵/	to brush teeth
繞	/lau⁵³/	to roam
屙尿	/o⁵³.ŋiau³¹/	to pee
屙屎	/o⁵³.ʃi²⁴/	to poo
歇睏	/hiat³⁴⁻³.kʰiun³¹/	to rest
休息	/hiu⁵³.sit³⁴/	to rest
睡目	/ʃoi²⁴⁻²².muk³⁴/	to sleep
䟘床	/hoŋ³¹.t͡soŋ⁵⁵/	to wake up
租	/t͡si⁵³/	to rent
讀書	/tʰuk³⁴⁻³.ʃu⁵³/	to read book
看	/kʰon³¹/	to see
放手	/pioŋ³¹.ʃiu²⁴/	to let go
哭	/kiau³¹/	to cry
敨氣	/tʰeu²⁴⁻²².hi³¹/	to breathe
行	/haŋ⁵⁵/	to walk
走	/t͡seu²⁴/	to run
拉	/lai⁵³/	to pull
拉	/lo⁵³/	to pull
𢱤	/suŋ²⁴/	to push
拿	/na⁵³/	to take

==== Adjectives ====
Singkawang Hakka	IPA pronunciations	Definition
燒	/ʃau⁵³/	hot
冷	/laŋ⁵³/	cold
闊	/fat³⁴/	wide
狹	/hap⁵/	narrow
香	/hioŋ⁵³/	fragrant
乾	/t͡sau⁵³/	dry
濕	/ʃip³⁴/	wet
光	/koŋ⁵³/	bright
暗	/am³¹/	dark
好	/ho²⁴/	good
高	/ko⁵³/	tall
矮	/ai²⁴/	short
肥	/pʰui⁵⁵/	fat
瘦	/seu³¹/	thin
猛	/maŋ⁵³/	fast
慢	/man²⁴/	slow
重要	/t͡sʰuŋ³¹.ʒiau³¹/	important
鬧熱	/nau²⁴⁻²².ŋiat⁵/	crowded
難過	/nan⁵.ko³¹/	sad
簡單	/kian²⁴⁻²².tan⁵³/	easy
難	/nan⁵⁵/	hard
聰明	/t͡sʰuŋ⁵³.min⁵⁵/	smart
蠢	/t͡sʰuŋ²⁴/	stupid
懶屍	/lan³³.ʃi⁵³/	lazy
善良	/ʃan³¹.lioŋ⁵⁵/	kind
恁好	/an⁵³.ho²⁴/	comfortable
恁有淘	/an⁵³.ʒiu⁵³.tʰau³¹/	comfortable

==== Sample sentences ====
Singkawang Hakka	IPA pronunciations	Definition
你會講唐人話毋?	/ŋi⁵⁵ boi²⁴ koŋ²⁴⁻²² tʰoŋ⁵.ŋin⁵⁵.boi⁵³ mo⁵/	Can you speak Chinese?
𠊎毋愛該兜雞春熟過頭。	/ŋai⁵⁵ mo⁵⁵ oi³¹ kai⁵⁵.teu⁵³ kai⁵³.t͡sʰun⁵³ ʃuk⁵.ko³¹.tʰeu⁵⁵/	I don't want those eggs to be overcooked.
今日燒過昨哺日。	/kin⁵³.ŋit³⁴ ʃau⁵³ ko³¹ tsʰo⁵.pun⁵³.ŋit³⁴/	Today is hotter than yesterday.
仰般佢知有用毋用?	/ŋioŋ²⁴⁻²².pan⁵³ ki⁵⁵ ti⁵³ ʒiu⁵³.ʒiuŋ²⁴ mo⁵⁵.ʒiuŋ²⁴/	How does he know whether it's useful or not?
該屋掃伶俐來。	/kai⁵⁵ buk³⁴ so³¹ laŋ⁵.li²⁴ loi⁵⁵/	Clean that house thoroughly.
將𠊎講个話佢知。	/t͡sioŋ⁵ ŋai⁵⁵ koŋ²⁴⁻²² kai³¹ boi²⁴ ki⁵⁵ ti⁵³/	Tell him what I said.
佢來毋得，佢有病。	/ki⁵⁵ loi⁵⁵ mo⁵⁵ tet³⁴，ki⁵⁵ ʒiu⁵³ pʰiaŋ²⁴⁻²²/	He can't come; he's sick.
𠊎去坤甸用轎。	/ŋai⁵⁵ hi³¹ kʰun⁵³.tʰien³¹ ʒiuŋ²⁴ kʰiau³¹/	I went to Pontianak in a sedan chair.
你愛去阿位?	/ŋi⁵⁵ oi³¹ hi³¹ a²⁴⁻²² .bui⁵⁵/	Where do you want to go?
細人子食燒茶。	/se³¹.ŋin⁵⁵.tsi²⁴ ʃit³⁴⁻³ ʃau⁵³.t͡sʰa⁵⁵/	The child is drinking hot tea.

== Writing system ==
Due to the prohibition of learning Chinese during the New Order era, Singkawang Hakka, along with other Chinese varieties spoken in the Indonesia, is now rarely written. Currently, most Hakka Chinese people in West Kalimantan are no longer able to read or write in Hakka but can only understand and speak the language. At present, there are very few Hakka speakers can write Chinese characters, typically elderly individuals who learned it in Chinese schools in the 1960s before it was closed down by the Indonesian government. With the rise of social media, more Singkawang Hakka speakers are communicating online with each other, mixing Hakka and Indonesian using the Latin alphabet, which follows the Indonesian orthography.

== See also ==
- Pontianak Hakka
- Hakka people
- Hakka culture
- Hailu dialect
- Taiwanese Hakka
- Sixian dialect
- Meixian dialect

== Bibliography ==
- Huang, Hui-chen (2008). 印尼山口洋客家話研究 [Study of Hakka in Singkawang, Indonesia] (PDF) (Master's thesis) (in Chinese). National Central University.
- Liang, Hsin-yu (2007). 印尼西加地區海陸客語接觸研究 [Language Contact and Change of Lu-Fung Hakka Spoken in West Kalimantan, Indonesia] (Master's thesis) (in Chinese). Fu Jen Catholic University.
- Schaank, S. H. (1897). Het Loeh-foeng-dialect (in Dutch). Leiden: E.J. Brill. ISBN 978-90-04-59928-4.
- Tanggok, M. Ikhsan (2017). Agama dan kebudayaan orang Hakka di Singkawang: memuja leluhur dan menanti datangnya rejeki [Religion and Culture of the Hakka People in Singkawang] (in Indonesian). Jakarta: Penerbit Buku Kompas. ISBN 978-602-412-173-0.
