= Pontianak Teochew =

Dialect of Teochew spoken in Pontianak, Indonesia

- Bahasa Tiociu Pontianak
- 坤甸潮州話 kung¹ diêng⁶ dio⁵ ziu¹ uê⁷ (Peng'im); Khun-tiān Tiô-tsiu-uē (PUJ)
- Pronunciation: /kʰuŋ³³.tiaŋ³⁵ tio⁵⁵⁻¹¹.t͡siu³³ ue¹¹/
- Native to: Indonesia (West Kalimantan)
- Region: Pontianak and Kubu Raya
- Ethnicity: Chinese Indonesian
- Native speakers: 172,832 (2013 estimation) (Note: Only in Pontianak city proper.)
- Language family: Sino-Tibetan: Sinitic; Chinese; Min; Coastal Min; Southern Min; Chaoshan Min; Pontianak Teochew
- Writing system: Latin script: Indonesian alphabet (most common); Peng'im (sporadic); Pe̍h-ūe-jī (sporadic); Chinese characters

Language codes
- ISO 639-3: nan for Southern Min / Min Nan which encompasses a variety of languages and dialects including "Teochew".
- Glottolog: chao1238
- Regencies and cities in West Kalimantan where Pontianak Teochew is spoken by a significant minority of the population

Pontianak Teochew (Chinese: 坤甸潮州話; Peng'im: kung¹ diêng⁶ dio⁵ ziu¹ uê; Pe̍h-ūe-jī: Khun-tiān Tiô-tsiu-uē; Indonesian: Bahasa Tiociu Pontianak) is a dialect of Teochew primarily spoken by the Chinese community in Pontianak, West Kalimantan, Indonesia. Pontianak Teochew was originally spoken by the Teochew people who migrated from the Chaoshan region in Guangdong, China. These migrants and their descendants constitute the majority of the Chinese population in Pontianak and its surrounding areas. Today, however, it serves as the lingua franca for the entire Chinese community in Pontianak. Pontianak Teochew has also become a common trade and marketplace language in Pontianak and its surrounding areas, even among non-Teochew Chinese communities, such as the Hakkas. The Teochew people primarily dominate the city center and the southern suburbs in Kubu Raya, while the Hakkas are more concentrated in the northern suburbs across the Kapuas River and neighboring areas, such as Mempawah Regency.

Unlike in Java, where the use of Chinese languages has declined due to language shift and past discouragement by the Indonesian government, the Chinese dialects spoken in Pontianak and West Kalimantan remain well preserved. Pontianak Teochew continues to be spoken across generations of the Chinese community in Pontianak, including by younger people. It is used in schools and markets, although there is a gradual shift toward Indonesian, particularly among the youth. Code-mixing between Pontianak Teochew and Indonesian is also a common phenomenon. Pontianak Teochew has undergone significant language contact with local languages, making it significantly different from the original Teochew dialect spoken in Guangdong. This language contact primarily involves Pontianak Malay, the native language of the area, and Indonesian, the national language. Additionally, Pontianak Teochew has been influenced by other Chinese varieties, such as Hakka. Many Chinese people in Pontianak are generally multilingual, speaking not only Teochew but also Hakka, Mandarin, Pontianak Malay, and Indonesian.

== History ==
Pontianak Teochew
- Traditional Chinese: 坤甸潮州話
- Simplified Chinese: 坤甸潮州话
Transcriptions
Standard Mandarin
- Hanyu Pinyin: Kūn diàn cháozhōu huà
Hakka
- Pha̍k-fa-sṳ: Khun-tîen Chhèu-chû-fa
Southern Min
- Teochew Peng'im: kung¹ diêng⁶ dio⁵ ziu¹ uê⁷

The Teochew people began migrating to what is now West Kalimantan during the 19th century. Originating from the Chaoshan region in southern Guangdong, they were part of a larger migration wave and typically passed through the port of Shantou on their journey. Initially, not all Chinese migrants to West Kalimantan were part of the middle class. Many traveled in groups, and it was common for some to work as farmers or small traders, placing them in the lower class. In contrast to Java and Sumatra, where Cantonese and Hokkien make up the majority of the Chinese population, these two groups form only a small minority in West Kalimantan. The majority in this region are Hakka, who settled in West Kalimantan much earlier, followed by the Teochew. These Chinese migrants began arriving when the Pontianak Sultanate invited them to engage in mining activities and help revitalize trade. The Teochew people have generally steered clear of politics, focusing primarily on trade. As a result, they were largely excluded from the establishment of the Lanfang Republic in the 19th century, which was almost entirely composed of Hakka.

The use of Teochew and other Chinese dialects was significantly discouraged following Indonesia's independence. In the 1950s, several policies were introduced across the archipelago targeting Chinese language and culture. In the summer of 1957, military commanders, intent on eliminating foreign ideologies, closed all Chinese-language schools. Then, in April 1958, a military decree was issued prohibiting the publication of newspapers and periodicals in Chinese. With the onset of the New Order, the government under Suharto introduced the official national policy regarding Chinese religion, beliefs, and traditions through Presidential Instruction No. 14/1967 (Inpress No. 14/1967). This policy mandated that all Chinese rituals and activities be confined to the family and not take place publicly. For more than thirty years, Teochew, along with other Chinese dialects, was explicitly discouraged in Indonesian-medium schools. Teachers encouraged the use of Indonesian and discouraged students from speaking their native languages.

Following the fall of the New Order, President Abdurrahman Wahid initiated significant reforms for the Chinese community by repealing the 1967 national policy through Presidential Decision No. 6/2000 (Keppres No. 6/2000). This was further supported by President Megawati Soekarnoputri, who issued Presidential Decision No. 19/2002 (Keppres No. 19/2002), declaring Chinese New Year a national holiday. These changes marked a shift toward greater acceptance and expression of Chinese culture and language. With Mandarin reintroduced in schools, Teochew is no longer as strictly prohibited as it once was.

== Geographic distribution and usage ==
The Chinese community forms the dominant ethnic group in Pontianak, making up an estimated 30% to 40% of the city's population. Of this population, more than half or two-thirds are Teochew, while the remaining portion consists of Hakkas or other Chinese groups.

In Pontianak, two varieties of Chinese are spoken: Teochew and Hakka. The Teochew dialect is the most widely spoken among the Chinese community in Pontianak. The Teochew population primarily resides in the urban areas of southern Pontianak and Kubu Raya Regency, whereas those in northern Pontianak, as well as the suburbs and rural areas, predominantly speak Hakka. However, many Hakka speakers in Pontianak are bilingual, fluent in both Hakka and Teochew—and the same is true vice versa. The Teochew are primarily urban dwellers, including plantation workers, shopkeepers, and traders, while the Hakka were traditionally rural inhabitants, working as miners, farmers, and small traders. However, following the forced migration of the 1960s, predominantly involving Hakka, this pattern was disrupted. The Teochew, being relatively better off and long-established residents of the city, saw their language gradually become the common spoken language for both Teochew and Hakka communities.

Teochew has become the lingua franca of the Chinese community in Pontianak, serving not only the Teochew population but also the Hakka and other Chinese ethnic groups. Code-mixing and code-switching between Teochew, Hakka, Pontianak Malay, and Indonesian are prevalent in daily interactions. Teochew is so deeply embedded in Pontianak that many non-Chinese individuals, especially business owners, can speak it to some extent. Teochew speakers in the region take great pride in their dialect, with younger generations often making a conscious effort to avoid code-mixing with Malay or Indonesian. In addition to learning Teochew as their mother tongue or first language, many Chinese youths in Pontianak also study Mandarin, which serves as the unifying language for ethnic Chinese communities. Proficiency in Mandarin is especially common among older generations and younger speakers who are actively working to reconnect with their cultural roots. Indonesian, the national language, is used in formal contexts such as schools, government institutions, and interethnic communication. Additionally, many Chinese people in Pontianak are fluent in Pontianak Malay, the local Malay dialect. While the majority of Pontianak Malay speakers are ethnically Malay, many non-Malay residents, including Chinese, also speak the local language. The use of Teochew is under threat due to a shift in language preferences. Currently, in daily life, many Chinese people in Pontianak prefers and uses Indonesian or Pontianak Malay. This indicates that the language used by the Chinese community in Pontianak has undergone a shift, especially among the younger generation.

== Phonology ==
=== Initials ===
In Pontianak Teochew, there are 18 distinct initials. They are: [p], [pʰ], [b], [m], [t], [tʰ], [n], [l], [z], [ts], [tsʰ], [s], [k], [kʰ], [g], [ŋ], [h], and [∅].

Pontianak Teochew initials
		Labial	Alveolar		Velar	Glottal
		Labial	plain	sibilant	Velar	Glottal
Nasal		[m] 毛 (mo⁵⁵)	[n] 年 (ni⁵⁵)		[ŋ] 硬 (ŋe³⁵)	
Plosive/ Affricate	plain	[p] 飛 (pue³³)	[t] 中 (tong³³)	[t͡s] 水 (t͡sui⁵³)	[k] 歌 (kua³³)	
Plosive/ Affricate	aspirated	[pʰ] 跑 (pʰau⁵³)	[tʰ] 看 (tʰoi⁵³)	[t͡sʰ] 秋 (t͡sʰiu³³)	[kʰ] 去 (kʰɯ¹¹)	
Plosive/ Affricate	voiced	[b] 賣(boi¹¹)	[d͡z] 乳 (d͡zu⁵³)		[g] 玉 (gek⁴)	
Fricative				[s] 三 (sa³³)		[h] 何 (ho⁵⁵)
Lateral			[l] 路 (lou¹¹)			

Notes:

- The consonant zero sound [∅], which is not included in the table, is found in the vocabulary 我 [ua⁵³], 爷 [ia⁵⁵], 英 [iŋ³³] and 幼 [iu²¹³].
- If [ɯ] is the final vowel and the finals are either [-ŋ] or [-k], they are pronounced as [ɣ].

==== Finals ====
There are a total of seven finals in Pontianak Teochew, consisting of three nasal finals and four plosive finals. In addition, Pontianak Teochew also includes two syllabic consonants, similar to those found in Taiwanese Hokkien.

Finals
	Bilabial	Alveolar	Velar	Glottal
Nasal	[m] 暗 (am²¹³)	[n] 安 (an³³)	[ŋ] 紅 (aŋ⁵⁵)	
Plosive	[p̚] 榻 (tʰap²¹)	[t̚] 吉 (kit²¹)	[k] 骨 (kuk⁴)	[ʔ] 尺 (t͡sʰioʔ²¹)

Syllabic consonant
	Bilabial	Velar
Nasal	[m̩] 姆 (m⁵³)	[ŋ̍] 黄 (ŋ⁵⁵)

=== Rhymes ===
Pontianak Teochew has 11 Vowels in total, comprising 6 simple vowels and 5 nasalized vowels. It also features 20 diphthongs and 4 triphthongs. In total, there are about 87 rimes.

==== Pure vowels ====
	Front		Back	
	Simple	Nasal	Simple	Nasal
Close	[i] 池 (ti⁵⁵)	[ĩ] 錢 (t͡sĩ⁵⁵)	[u] 有 (u³⁵) [ɯ] 猪 (tɯ³⁵)	[ũ] 關 (kũẽ³³)
Close-Mid	[e] 花 (hue³³)	[ẽ] 病 (pẽ¹¹)	[o] 坐 (t͡so³⁵)	[õ] 娘 (niõ⁵⁵)
Open	[a] 早 (t͡sa⁵³)	[ã] 媽 (mã⁵⁵)		

==== Diphthongs and triphthongs ====
Diphthong										Triphthong	
ai 來 (lai⁵⁵)	au 老 (lau³⁵)	ia 椰 (ia⁵⁵)	io 椒 (t͡sio³³)	iu 友 (iu⁵³)	ua 拖 (tʰua³³)	ue 杯 (pue³³)	ui 悲 (pui³³)	oi 題 (toi⁵⁵)	ou 布 (pou²¹³)	iau 焦 (t͡siau³³)	uai 怪 (kuai²¹³)
ãĩ 愛 (ãĩ²¹³)	ãũ 好 (hau²¹³)	ĩã 餅 (piã⁵³)	ĩõ 姜 (kĩõ⁵³)	ĩũ 休 (hiu³³)	ũã 單 (tũã³³)	ũẽ 糜 (mũẽ⁵⁵)	ũĩ 胖 (pũĩ²¹³)	õĩ 第 (tõĩ³⁵)	õũ 某 (mõũ⁵³)	iãũ 苗 (miãũ⁵⁵)	ũãĩ 果 (kũãĩ⁵³)

==== Nuclei with nasal codas ====
-m	am 擔 (tam³³)		im 林 (lim⁵⁵)	iam 添 (tʰiam³³)					uam 繁 (huam⁵⁵)		
-n	an 慢 (man¹¹)		in 面 (min¹¹)		ien 珍 (tien³³)			un 文 (bun⁵⁵)	uan 萬 (buan¹¹)		ɯn 銀 (ŋɯn³³)
-ŋ	aŋ 幫 (baŋ³³)	eŋ 猛 (meŋ⁵³)		iaŋ 天 (tʰiaŋ³³)		ioŋ 雄 (hioŋ⁵⁵)	oŋ 東 (toŋ³³)	uŋ 拳 (kʰuŋ⁵⁵)	uaŋ 忘 (buaŋ²¹³)	ueŋ 宏 (kʰueŋ⁵⁵)	ɯŋ 湯 (tʰɯŋ³³)

==== Checked rhymes ====
-p	ap 答 (tap²¹)			ip 濕 (sip²¹)	iap 捷 (t͡siap⁴)		op □ (hop⁴)				uap 法 (huap²¹)			
-t	at 力 (lat²¹)			it 密 (bit⁴)					oit 拔 (poit²¹)	ut 出 (t͡sʰut²¹)	uat 發 (huat²¹)			
-k	ak 目 (mak²¹)	ek 肉 (nek⁴)		ik 蔑 (bik⁴)	iak 滅 (miak⁴)	iok 質 (t͡siok²¹)	ok 托 (tʰok²¹)			uk 不 (puk²¹)	uak 閲 (luak²¹)	uek 穴 (huek⁴)		ɯk 乞 (kʰɯk²¹)
-ʔ	aʔ 打 (pʰaʔ²¹)	eʔ 白 (peʔ⁴)	ẽʔ 脉 (mẽʔ⁴)	iʔ 鐵 (tʰiʔ²¹)	iaʔ 食 (t͡siaʔ⁴)	ioʔ 借 (t͡sioʔ²¹)	oʔ 桌 (toʔ²¹)	õʔ 膜 (mõʔ²¹)			uaʔ 熱 (d͡zuaʔ⁴)	ueʔ 血 (hueʔ²¹)	uẽʔ 物 (uẽʔ⁴)	

=== Tones ===
The tonal system of Pontianak Teochew remains largely identical to the original Teochew spoken in Guangdong, particularly the Jieyang dialect. Pontianak Teochew has a tonal system with eight distinct tones, which are further classified into yin (陰, "dark") and yang (陽, "light") tones. These tones are classified into four categories: level tones, rising tones, falling tones, and entering tones. Each category includes both voiced and devoiced variations, resulting in a total of eight distinct tones. Due to the influence of Indonesian and Malay, both non-tonal languages, many Teochew speakers in Pontianak have gradually lost the distinction between high and low tones, a defining feature of Teochew as spoken in Guangdong. As a result, some speakers no longer use tones in their speech.

Pontianak Teochew tones
	Upper/Dark (陰)					Lower/Light (陽)				
	No.	Name	Contour	Sandhied	Examples	No.	Name	Contour	Sandhied	Examples
Level (平)	1	陰平 im-pêng	[˧] (33)	[˧] (33)	珠 [t͡su³³], 知 [t͡sai³³]	2	陽平 iang-pêng	[˥˥] (55)	[˩] (11)	銅 [taŋ⁵⁵], 陳 [tan⁵⁵]
Rising (上)	3	陰上 im-siang	[˥˧] (53)	[˧˥] (35)	感 [kam⁵³], 早 [t͡sa⁵³]	4	陽上 iang-siang	[˧˥] (35)	[˩] (11)	老 [lau³⁵], 坐 [t͡so³⁵]
Departing (去)	5	陰去 im-khu	[˨˩˧] (213)	[˥˧] (53)	吊 [tiau²¹³], 教 [ka²¹³]	6	陽去 iang-khu	[˩] (11)	[˩] (11)	地 [ti¹¹], 謝 [sia¹¹]
Entering (入)	7	陰入 im-jip	[˨˩] (21)	[˦] (4)	筆 [pit²¹], 急 [kip²¹]	8	陽入 iang-jip	[˦] (4)	[˨˩] (21)	雜 [t͡sap⁴], 合 [ap⁴]

==== Tone sandhi ====
The tone sandhi of Pontianak Teochew generally follows the patterns found in other Teochew dialects. The rules are summarized below:

- Medium-level (1) and low-level (6) do not change.
- The entering tones (7 and 8) are interchanged.
- The low 陽 tones (2, 4, 8) all become low (6, or 7 in the case of 8).

== Grammar ==
The word order of existential sentences in Pontianak Teochew mirrors that of Mandarin and other Chinese varieties. Similarly, sentences with verbal predicates in Pontianak Teochew also generally follow the subject-verb-object word order (SVO) pattern, consistent with other Chinese languages.

=== Perfective aspects ===
Similar to Mandarin and other Chinese varieties, Pontianak Teochew incorporates perfective aspects. In Pontianak Teochew, the perfective marker signifies that an event is completed, represents the event as lacking internal structure, or conveys the event without highlighting its continuing relevance to the present. An example of the use of a perfective aspect marker is as follows:

Anna 去 鋪頭 囉。
Anna kʰə potʰau lou
Anna go shop PERF
Anna went to the shop .

With a perfective marker, such as lou (囉) the sentence conveys the meaning "Anna went to the market." The perfective marker lou in this context highlights the temporal property of the event, specifically that it is completed.

The perfective aspect stands in contrast to both the imperfective and prospective aspects. The imperfective aspect represents an event as having internal structure, such as being ongoing or habitual, while the prospective aspect describes actions or events that are about to occur. Similar to the perfective aspect, the imperfective aspect can also be indicated using various markers, time-related adverbs, and auxiliaries.

Another examples of perfective markers in Pontianak Teochew are diau (掉) and dioh (著). Diau conveys meanings opposite to those associated with lou. While lou marks completed events, diau expresses that the event is unexpected, unplanned, or negative. However, it can also describe events that are neutral, meaning the interpretation can shift depending on the context, potentially conveying either a positive or negative connotation. Similar to diau, dioh also indicates an unexpected and unplanned event. However, unlike diau, which generally conveys a negative tone from the speaker's perspective, dioh does not inherently carry a positive or negative value. The interpretation of whether the event is viewed as positive or negative depends on the context and the speaker's perspective. Examples of the usage of diau and dioh are as follows:

我 個 目鏡 壞 掉。
ua kai mak-kia pit diau
My POSS glasses broke PERF
My glasses broke.

阿翔 撵 著 孥囝。
Asiang leng dioh nongkia
Asiang push PERF child
Asiang pushed a child.

Each of these three markers conveys a specific meaning from the speaker's perspective and is used with different types of verbs, such as transitive or intransitive. The marker lou indicates that the speaker expected the event to occur and views it positively. It can co-occur with both transitive and intransitive predicates. In contrast, the markers diau and dioh both express the speaker's perception that the event was "unexpected." However, diau generally conveys that the event is negative from the speaker's perspective, while dioh is more neutral, with the meaning depending on the context to indicate whether the event is perceived as positive or negative. Moreover, diau and dioh exhibit complementary distribution in terms of syntactic properties: diau is used with intransitive unaccusative verbs, while dioh is used with transitive and dynamic predicates.

=== Negations ===
The negations or negative markers in Pontianak Teochew can generally be categorized into two types: those beginning with 'b', such as bo (無), boi (𣍐), and bue (未), and those beginning with 'm', such as m (唔), mo (莫), and min (免). While some of these markers can be synchronically decomposed into two morphemes, others cannot.

The negative marker bo originates from the morphemes b ‘not’, a bound negative marker that cannot stand alone, and u (有) ‘exist, have’. Based on its meaning, bo is closer to méiyǒu (沒有), meaning ‘not exist, not have’ in Mandarin. Similar to the morpheme yǒu in Mandarin, the morpheme u in Pontianak Teochew can express ‘possession’ or ‘having.’ Below is an example comparing the use of u and bo respectively:

我 有 鐳。
Ua u lui
I have money
I have money.

我 無 鐳。
Ua bo lui
I {not have} money
I don't have money.

The examples above demonstrate that the negive marker bo can negate an event that has an affirmative form of u (‘exist’).

This negative marker boi expresses inability and negates epistemic modality. The declarative form using oi ‘able’ indicates ability, while its negative counterpart, boi, means ‘unable’. For example:

伊 會 泅水。
I oi siu-cui
He able swim
He can swim.

伊 𣍐 泅水。
I boi siu-cui
He {not able} swim
He cannot swim.

Another modal auxiliary expressing ability is hiau (曉). The usage in affirmative sentences is generally the same as oi, with oi being replaced by hiau, and the negative form is boi hiau (𣍐曉). However, there is a slight difference between the affirmative sentences using oi and those using hiau. Hiau indicates a higher level of skill than oi when referring to ability.

The negation bue means ‘not yet,’ similar to hái méi (還沒) in Mandarin. It grammatically negates transitive, intransitive unaccusative, or intransitive unergative predicates. For example:

我 未 遇 朋友。
Ua bue ngo pʰeng-iu
I {not have} meet friend
I have not met a friend.

This negative marker m ‘not’ negates certain verbal or adjectival predicates, particularly stative verbs—those that describe a state or condition that is static and unchanging, such as know or believe. The negative marker m also negates the copula si (是), which appears optionally in the affirmative form. The key difference between sentences using si and those without it is that the former adds emphasis to the predicate. It can also negate the modal hiau ‘can’ to form m hiau (唔曉) ‘cannot'. Example of its usage are shown below:

我 唔 是 學生。
Ua m si hak-seng
I not COP student
I am not a student.

伊 唔 歡喜。
I m huan-hi
He not happy
He is not happy.

The negative marker mo expresses the preference that something had better not happen. Mo is also used in negative imperatives. Similar to English imperatives, the implied subject ‘you’ is not pronounced. For example:

莫 呴薰 在 只塊!
Mo kuh-hun to {tsio}
Don't smoke PREP here!
Don't smoke here!

The negation min means ‘no need’ and expresses a lack of necessity or requirement. Min can occur with a transitive, intransitive unergative, or intransitive unaccusative predicate. For example:

許 條 船 免 沉。
Hi tiau tsun min tim
DET CL ship {no need} sink
The ship does not need to sink.

=== Verbs ===
Verbs in Pontianak Teochew are categorized into three types: intransitive, transitive, and ditransitive.

In Pontianak Teochew, the basic word order of a intransitive sentence follows a subject-verb structure. Reversing this order to verb-subject results in ungrammaticality. Furthermore, the subject is not marked, meaning subjects of Unergative verbs are identcal in form to those of Unaccusative verbs. These features are illustrated in the following sentences:

許 個 丈夫囝 哭。
Hi kai tapokiã khau
that CL {male child} cry
That boy cries.

The basic word order of a transitive sentence is subject-verb-object (SVO). Alternative word orders, such as object-verb-subject (OVS), verb-object-subject (VOS), object-subject-verb (OSV), and verb-subject-object (VSO), are ungrammatical. Neither the subject nor the object is marked, and their thematic roles are determined solely by theirposition in the sentence. For example:

阿玲 食 木瓜。
Aling tsiak pakue
Aling eat papaya
Aling eat papaya.

阿玲 買 蜀 包 米。
Aling boi tsek pao pi
Aling buy one CL rice
Aling bought one pack of rice.

Ditransitive sentences in Pontianak Teochew have two basic structures. In one form, the indirect object and direct object appear adjacent to each other without additional marking. In the other form, the indirect object is introduced by the preposition kheh (乞) 'give' or 'to'. This structure is similar to the prepositional dative in English, where the indirect object is marked by a preposition (e.g., "John sent a letter to Mary"). In the double-object construction, the indirect object (IO) must precede the direct object (DO). Reversing the order of these arguments results in an ungrammatical sentence. Verbs like kheh and pung (分) ‘give’ permit both the double-object and prepositional dative constructions. In contrast, verbs like boi (賣) ‘sell’ allow only the prepositional dative order, while verbs like ka (教) ‘teach’ exclusively allow the double-object order. These features are illustrated in the following sentences:

阿玲 乞 阿翔 許 個 書。
Aling kheh Asiang hi kai tsɯ
Aling give Asiang that CL book
Aling gave Asiang that book.

阿玲 教 英文 乞 阿翔。
Aling ka engbun kheh Asiang
Aling teach English to Asiang
Aling taught English to Asiang.

== Difference with other Teochew dialects ==
Many characteristics of other Teochew dialects are still preserved in Pontianak Teochew. However, it has also adopted new features, particularly in vocabulary, while simultaneously retaining certain phonological traits that have become obsolete in the Teochew dialects spoken in China.

=== Phonological aspects ===
The phonological aspects between Pontianak Teochew and other Teochew dialects are mostly identical. They all have 19 consonants and Below are some phonological distinctions of Pontianak Teochew in comparison to other Teochew dialects:

- Pontianak Teochew has 35 vowels, while other Teochew dialects such as the Jieyang dialect only has 21.
- Pontianak Teochew has 88 rimes, while other Teochew dialects such as the Jieyang dialect has only 79. Pontianak Teochew includes 11 additional rimes: [-an, -ien, -uan, -in, -un, -ɯn, -at, -ut, -uat, -it, -oit], which are absent in Jieyang Teochew, but lacks [-oiʔ] and [-auʔ], which are found in the Jieyang dialect.
- Pontianak Teochew has a front nasal coda, while other dialects such as the Jieyang dialect does not have a front nasal coda and is pronounced as a back nasal coda.
- Pontianak Teochew retains the entering tone [-t] final rhyme from Middle Chinese, while the most Teochew dialects no longer has the [-t] final rhyme.
- Pontianak Teochew retains the full set of nasal codas [-m, -n, -ŋ] and the full set of the Middle Chinese entering tone codas [-p, -t, -k]. The Jieyang dialect only retains the nasal codas [-m, -ŋ] without the front nasal coda [-n], and only retains the Middle Chinese entering tone [-p, -k].

=== Tones ===
The tonal system of Pontianak Hakka remains largely identical to that of Teochew dialects spoken in mainland China, particularly the Jieyang dialect. Like most Min Nan varieties, it features eight distinct tones. However, due to the influence of Indonesian and Malay, many Pontianak Teochew speakers either no longer use tones fully or do not emphasize them as strongly. Below is a comparison of the tonal systems of Teochew as spoken in Pontianak, Jieyang, Shantou, and Chaozhou:

	Yingping (陰平)	Yangping (陽平)	Yingshang (陰上)	Yangshang (陽上)	Yinqu (陰去)	Yangqu (陽去)	Yinru (陰入)	Yangru (陽入)
Pontianak	[˧] (33)	[˥˥] (55)	[˥˧] (53)	[˧˥] (35)	[˨˩˧] (213)	[˩] (11)	[˨˩] (21)	[˦] (4)
Jieyang	[˧] (33)	[˥˥] (55)	[˥˧] (53)	[˧˥] (35)	[˨˩˧] (213)	[˩] (11)	[˨] (22) ~ [˨˩] (21)	[˦] (4)
Shantou	[˧] (33)	[˥˥] (55)	[˥˧] (53)	[˧˥] (35)	[˨˩˧] (213)	[˩] (11)	[˨] (22) ~ [˨˩] (21)	[˥] (5)
Chaozhou	[˧] (33)	[˥˥] (55)	[˥˧] (53)	[˧˥] (35)	[˨˩˧] (213)	[˩] (11)	[˨] (22) ~ [˨˩] (21)	[˥] (5)

=== Vocabulary ===
The vocabulary of Pontianak Teochew largely retains the core characteristics of Teochew. For instance, in terms of meaning, 手 [tsʰiu⁵³] refers to both the hand and arm, while 眉 [tsʰu²¹³] means "house." Structurally, the order of morphemes and the use of affixes remain largely consistent with Teochew, as seen in reversed compounds like 猪母 (sow), 牛公 (bull), and 人客 (guest), as well as affixed words such as 囝 [kia⁵³], which forms derivatives like 路囝 (road), 刀囝 (knife), and 姐妹囝 (sisters). However, in terms of lexical origins, Pontianak Teochew exhibits notable differences from the Teochew dialects spoken in Guangdong. The vocabulary of Pontianak Teochew originates from multiple sources, including core Teochew words, terms unique to the Swatou and Jieyang dialects, loanwords from Indonesian and Malay, influences from other non-Indonesian languages and dialects, and a considerable number of newly coined words specific to Pontianak Teochew.

Pontianak Teochew shares a significant portion of its vocabulary with the dialects of Jieyang, Chaozhou, and Shantou. While many words align closely with Jieyang dialect, a smaller number reflect distinct Chaozhou influences. Some words show similarities with both Jieyang and Swatou dialects, while others exhibit noticeable morphological and syntactic differences. Additionally, Pontianak Teochew has incorporated a considerable number of loanwords from Indonesian, Malay and English, as well as hybrid formations unique to the local linguistic environment. Additionally, Pontianak Teochew has been influenced not only by local languages but also by other Chinese dialects, particularly Hokkien, Hakka, and Mandarin. Some words resembling Mandarin likely originated from Mandarin education, where original terms were adopted but adapted to Teochew pronunciation. In other cases, words were directly borrowed by imitating Mandarin pronunciation.

== Lexicons ==
The vocabulary of Pontianak Teochew is primarily influenced by the Jieyang dialect. However, due to its distance from the main Teochew-speaking regions, where the linguistic base has been established for centuries, Pontianak Teochew has developed unique characteristics. The interaction between migrants from Jieyang and Shantou, as well as contact with people from different backgrounds, has contributed to this distinction.

Like other Chinese varieties in Indonesia, the Teochew spoken in Pontianak has incorporated vocabulary influenced by the local Malay dialect and Indonesian, distinguishing it from the variety spoken in China. This influence is evident in the presence of Malay and Indonesian loanwords within Pontianak Teochew. However, compared to other Teochew dialects in Indonesia—such as the variety spoken in Jambi, which has undergone significant influence and adopted numerous loanwords from Hokkien and the local Malay dialect—Pontianak Teochew remains more conservative. It has preserved much of its original vocabulary, reflecting a stronger connection to its linguistic roots. However, Pontianak Teochew has also developed unique vocabulary that is not found in other Teochew dialects.

=== Locally coined words ===
Due to interactions with other groups, Pontianak Teochew has incorporated vocabulary not found in Guangdong Teochew dialects. While these words constitute only a small portion of the lexicon, they remain significant. Examples include 唐山 'China' or 'ancestral homeland'; 番囝 'indigenous people'; 痴宫 'psychiatric hospital'; 房宫 'bedroom'; 丛浴 'bathing; 食風屐 'stubbornness'; 霜厨 'refrigerator'; 公司 'public expenses'; 做字 'handle official matters'; and 棒柔 'bribery'. Furthermore, some words that have faded from use in Guangdong Teochew dialects are still preserved in Pontianak Teochew. For instance, 我儂 /ua⁵³.naŋ/ is used for "we/us," and 汝儂 /lɯ⁵³.naŋ⁵³/ for "you (plural)," whereas in Guangdong Teochew dialects, these original terms have disappeared, replaced by 阮 /uaŋ⁵³/ and 恁 /niŋ⁵³/ respectively. Below is a list of distinct words coined in Pontianak Teochew, along with comparisons to Jieyang, Chaozhou and Swatou dialects:

Pontianak	Jieyang	Chaozhou	Swatow	Definition	Note
雨靜 /hou³⁵⁻¹¹.t͡sẽ³⁵/	雨歇 /hou³⁵⁻¹¹.hiaʔ²¹/	雨歇 /hou³⁵⁻¹¹.hiaʔ²¹/	雨歇 /hou³⁵⁻¹¹.hiaʔ²¹/	rain stopped	
天晴 /tʰĩ³³.t͡sẽ³⁵/	天時好 /tʰĩ³³.si⁵⁵⁻¹¹.ho⁵³/	天時好 /tʰĩ³³.si⁵⁵⁻¹¹.ho⁵³/	天時好 /tʰĩ³³.si⁵⁵⁻¹¹.ho⁵³/	clear day	
插秧 /t͡sʰak²¹⁻⁴.ĩõ⁵⁵/	佈田 /pou²¹³⁻⁵³.t͡sʰaŋ⁵⁵/	佈田 /pou²¹³⁻⁵³.t͡sʰaŋ⁵⁵/	佈田 /pou²¹³⁻⁵³.t͡sʰaŋ⁵⁵/	rice planting	
紅梨 /aŋ⁵⁵⁻¹¹.lai⁵⁵/ 王梨 /uaŋ⁵⁵⁻¹¹.lai⁵⁵/	番梨 /huaŋ³³.lai⁵⁵/	番梨 /huaŋ³³.lai⁵⁵/	番梨 /huaŋ³³.lai⁵⁵/	pineapple	
蛤牯 /kap²¹⁻⁴.kou⁵³/	水雞 /t͡sui⁵³⁻³⁵.koi³³/ 蛤虯 /kap²¹⁻⁴.kiu⁵³/	蛤虯 /kap²¹⁻⁵.kiu⁵³/ 水雞 /t͡sui⁵³⁻³⁵.koi³³/	水雞 /t͡sui⁵³⁻³⁵.koi³³/ 蛤虯 /kap²¹⁻⁵.kiu⁵³/	frog	
厝 /t͡sʰu²¹³/	家 /ke³³/	内 /lai⁵³/	家 /ke³³/	house	The term 厝 is also used in some Teochew and Hokkien dialects.
雷公睨目 /lui⁵⁵⁻¹¹.koŋ³³.nĩʔ²¹⁻⁴.mak⁴/	阿公睨目 /a³³.koŋ³³.nĩʔ²¹⁻⁴.mak⁴/	阿公睨目 /a³³.koŋ³³.nĩʔ²¹⁻⁵.mak⁵/	阿公睨目 /a³³.koŋ³³.nĩʔ²¹⁻⁵.mak⁵/	lightning	
衫抽 /sã³³.t͡sʰiu⁵³/	手䘼 /t͡sʰiu⁵³⁻³⁵.ŋ⁵³/ 衫䘼 /sã³³.ŋ⁵³/	手䘼 /t͡sʰiu⁵³⁻³⁵.ŋ⁵³/ 衫䘼 /sã³³.ŋ⁵³/	手䘼 /t͡sʰiu⁵³⁻³⁵.ŋ⁵³/ 衫䘼 /sã³³.ŋ⁵³/	sleeve	
大結 /tua²¹³⁻⁵³.kʰat²¹/	雄 /hioŋ³³/	健 /kĩã¹¹/	雄 /hioŋ³³/	strong and sturdy	
牙 /ge⁵⁵/	齒 /kʰi⁵³/	齒 /kʰi⁵³/	齒 /kʰi⁵³/	tooth	
查某囝 /t͡sa⁵⁵⁻¹¹.bou⁵³⁻⁵⁵.kĩã⁵³/	走囝 /t͡sau⁵³⁻³⁵.kĩã⁵³/	走囝 /t͡sau⁵³⁻³⁵.kĩã⁵³/	走囝 /t͡sau⁵³⁻³⁵.kĩã⁵³/	daughter	The term 查某囝 is primarily used in Hokkien but can also be found in some Southeast Asian Teochew dialects.
大肚查某 /tua¹¹.tou³⁵⁻¹¹ .t͡sa⁵⁵⁻¹¹.bou⁵³/	大肚婆 /tua¹¹.tou³⁵⁻¹¹.pʰua⁵⁵/	大肚婆 /tua¹¹.tou³⁵⁻¹¹.pʰua⁵⁵/	大肚婆 /tua¹¹.tou³⁵⁻¹¹.pʰua⁵⁵/	pregnant women	
喊 /ham²¹³/	叫 /kio²¹³/	叫 /kie²¹³/	叫 /kio²¹³/	to call	
行時 /kĩã⁵⁵⁻¹¹.si⁵⁵/	時興 /si⁵⁵⁻¹¹.heŋ³³/	時興 /si⁵⁵⁻¹¹.heŋ³³/	時興 /si⁵⁵⁻¹¹.heŋ³³/	to be in fashion	
圈 /kʰuaŋ³³/	繞 /d͡ziau²¹³/	繞 /d͡ziau²¹³/	繞 /d͡ziau²¹³/	to go around	
浮火 /pʰu⁵⁵⁻¹¹.hue⁵³/	火着 /hue⁵³⁻³⁵.toʔ⁵/	火着 /hue⁵³⁻³⁵.toʔ⁵/	火着 /hue⁵³⁻³⁵.toʔ⁵/	to get angry	
扶 /hu⁵⁵/	捧 /pʰoŋ⁵³/	捧 /pʰoŋ⁵³/	捧 /pʰoŋ⁵³/	to hold up in two hands	
灇浴 /t͡saŋ⁵³⁻³⁵.ek⁴/	洗浴 /soi⁵³⁻³⁵.ek⁴/	洗浴 /soi⁵³⁻³⁵.ek⁵/	洗浴 /soi⁵³.ek⁵/	to shower	The term 灇浴 can also be found in other Southeast Asian Teochew dialects, such as those spoken in Singapore and Bangkok, as well as in some Hokkien dialects.
半工 /pũã²¹³⁻⁵³.kaŋ³³/	兼職 /kiam³³. t͡seʔ²¹/	兼職 /kiam³³. t͡seʔ²¹/	兼職 /kiam³³. t͡seʔ²¹/	to have a part time job	

=== Loan words ===
==== Other Chinese varieties ====
Teochew has been influenced by other Chinese varieties, including Hokkien, Hakka, and Mandarin. Hokkien is one of the most widely spoken Chinese varieties in Indonesia and Southeast Asia, while Hakka is the dominant Chinese variety in West Kalimantan, and Mandarin served as the lingua franca among the Chinese community. As a result, these languages have significantly shaped Pontianak Teochew. Below are some Pontianak Teochew words borrowed from Hokkien, Hakka, and Mandarin, alongside their corresponding Teochew terms from Guangdong for comparison:

Pontianak Teochew	Guangdong Teochew	Original word	Originated from	Definition	Note
龍眼 /leŋ⁵⁵⁻¹¹.ŋaŋ⁵³/	肉眼 /nek⁴⁻²¹.õĩ⁵³/	龍眼 /liɪŋ²⁴⁻²².ɡan⁵³/	Hokkien	longan	
肉丸 /bak⁴⁻²¹.uaŋ⁵⁵/	肉圓 /nek⁴⁻²¹.ĩ⁵⁵/	肉丸 /baʔ³²⁻⁵³.uan²⁴/	Hokkien	meatball	
雲 /hun⁵⁵/	雲 /huŋ⁵⁵/	雲 /hun³⁵/	Hokkien	cloud	The hanzi words are the same in both Pontianak and Guangdong Teochew, but the pronunciation in Pontianak Teochew is more influenced by Hokkien.
雞目 /koi³³.mak⁵³/	雀盲 /t͡siauʔ²¹⁻⁴.me⁵⁵/	雞目 /kue⁴⁴⁻²².bak⁵⁴/	Hokkien	nyctalopia	
塗油 /tʰou⁵⁵⁻¹¹.iu⁵⁵/	火油 /hue⁵³⁻³⁵.iu⁵⁵/	塗油 /tʰɔ²⁴⁻²².iu²⁴/	Hokkien	kerosene	
吊菜 /tiau²¹³⁻⁵³.t͡sai²¹³/	茄 /kio⁵⁵/	吊菜 /tiau⁵³⁻⁵⁵.t͡sʰoɪ⁵³/	Hakka	eggplant	
豆腐水 /tau¹¹.hu¹¹.t͡sui⁵³/	豆腐漿 /tau¹¹.hu¹¹.t͡sĩõ³³	豆腐水 /tʰeu⁵³⁻⁵⁵.fu⁵³⁻⁵⁵.sui³¹/	Hakka	soy milk	
家娘 /ke⁵⁵⁻¹¹.nĩõ⁵⁵/	大家 /tai³⁵⁻¹¹.ke³³/	家娘 /ka⁴⁴⁻³⁵.ŋiɔŋ¹¹/	Hakka	mother-in-law	
家官 /ke⁵⁵⁻¹¹.kũã³³/	大官 /tua¹¹.kũã³³/	家官 /ka⁴⁴.kuɔn⁴⁴/	Hakka	father-in-law	
條 /tiau⁵⁵/	尾 /bue⁵³/	條 /tʰiɑu³⁵/	Mandarin	classifier for fish	
菠菜 /po³³.t͡sai²¹³/	菠薐 /pue³³.leŋ⁵⁵/	菠菜 /pu̯ɔ⁵⁵.t͡sʰaɪ̯⁵¹/	Mandarin	spinach	
收工 /siu³⁵⁻¹¹.kaŋ³³/	落班 /loʔ⁴⁻²¹.paŋ³³/	收工 /ʂoʊ̯⁵⁵.kʊŋ⁵⁵/	Mandarin	to get off work	
修理 /siu³³.li⁵³/	收拾 /siu³³.sip⁴/	修理 /ɕi̯oʊ̯⁵⁵.li²¹⁴⁻²¹⁽⁴⁾/	Mandarin	to repair	

==== Indonesian and Malay ====
Pontianak Teochew has been influenced by loanwords from Indonesian and Malay, primarily in domains closely related to daily life. Most of these borrowed words represent concrete concepts, such as geography, minerals, natural phenomena, agriculture, plants, food, fruits, animals, housing, furniture, tools, everyday objects, cuisine, demographics, and education. Below are some Pontianak Teochew words borrowed from Indonesian and Malay:

Pontianak Teochew	Guangdong Teochew	Malay/Indonesian	Definition	Note
峇囝 /ba¹¹.kĩã⁵²/	鱷魚 /ŋak⁴⁻²¹.hɯ⁵⁵/	buaya	crocodile	Likely borrowed from Hokkien 峇仔 (bôa-iá). Also used in Southeast Asian Teochew varieties.
鐳 /lui⁵⁵/	錢 /t͡sĩ⁵⁵/ 鐳 /lui⁵⁵/	duit	money	Commonly used across Chinese varieties in Southeast Asia and also understood in some Hokkien and Teochew dialects in China.
巴剎 /pa³³.sak²¹/	菜市 /t͡sʰai²¹³⁻⁵⁵.t͡sʰi³⁵/ 街市 /koi³³.t͡sʰi³⁵/	pasar	market	Derived from the Persian word bazaar (بازار). Commonly used in Min Nan varieties in Southeast Asia.
剪攏刀 /ka³³.loŋ⁵³.to¹¹/	麻袋 /mua⁵⁵⁻¹¹.to¹¹/	karung	gunny sack	
拉絲 /la³⁵⁻¹¹.si³³/	領帶 /nĩã⁵³⁻³⁵.tua²¹³/	dasi	necktie	
雪文 /sap²¹⁻⁴.buŋ⁵⁵/	餅藥 /pĩã⁵³⁻³⁵.ioʔ⁴/	sabun	soap	Derived from the Portuguese word sabão. Commonly used across Chinese varieties in Southeast Asia and also understood in some Hokkien and Teochew dialects in China and Taiwan.
磨羽 /ba¹¹.u⁵³/	氣味 /kʰi²¹³⁻⁵⁵.bi¹¹/	bau	smell	
沙拉 /sa³³.la³³/	賺 /t͡suaŋ²¹³/ 唔著 /m³⁵⁻¹¹.tioʔ⁴/	salah	wrong	
舒甲 /su³³.kaʔ²¹/	歡喜 /hũã³³.hi⁵²/ 愛 /ãĩ²¹³/	suka	to like	
巴龍 /pa³³.leŋ³³/	倒 /to⁵³/	baring	to lie down	
/to³³.mat⁵⁵/	番茄 /huaŋ³³⁻²³.kie⁵⁵/	tomat	tomato	
/d͡zia³³.goŋ⁵⁵/	薏米仁 /ĩ²¹³⁻⁵⁵.bi⁵³⁻³⁵.d͡ziŋ⁵⁵/	jagung	corn	
/d͡ziam³³.ban³³/	東司 /taŋ³³.si³³/ 廁所 /t͡sʰe²¹³⁻⁵⁵.so⁵³/	jamban	restroom	
/kan³³.to⁵⁵/	辦公室 /pʰõĩ¹¹.koŋ³³.sik²¹/	kantor	office	Derived from the Dutch word kantoor.
/o³³.kom³³/	罰款 /huak⁴⁻²¹.kʰuaŋ⁵³/	hukum	fine	Derived from the Arabic word ḥukm (حُكْم).
/an⁵⁵⁻¹¹.lok⁴/	毛巾 /mo⁵⁵⁻¹¹.kɯŋ³³/	handuk	towel	Derived from the Dutch word handdoek.

=== Sample words ===
Below are some examples of commonly used Pontianak Teochew words:

==== Quantifier ====
Pontianak Teochew	IPA pronunciations	Definition
空	/kʰoŋ³³/	zero
蜀	/t͡sek⁴/	one
二	/no³⁵/	two
兩	/ŋgo³⁵/	two
三	/sã³³/	three
四	/si²¹³/	four
五	/ŋou³⁵/	five
六	/lak⁵/	six
七	/t͡sʰik²¹/	seven
八	/poit²¹/	eight
九	/kau⁵³/	nine
十	/t͡sap⁵/	ten
百	/peʔ²¹/	hundred
千	/t͡sʰãĩ³³/	thousand
萬	/buan¹¹/	ten thousand
半	/pũã²¹³/	half

==== Pronouns ====
Pontianak Teochew	IPA pronunciations	Definition
我	/ua⁵³/	I
汝	/lɯ⁵³/	you
伊	/i³³/	he/she
我儂	/ua⁵³⁻³⁵.naŋ⁵³/	we
汝儂	/lɯ⁵³⁻³⁵.naŋ⁵³/	you all
伊儂	/i³³.naŋ⁵³/	they
大家	/tai³⁵⁻¹¹.ke³³/	everyone
家己	/ka⁵⁵⁻¹¹.ki³³/	myself
底𫢗	/ti¹¹.tiaŋ⁵⁵/	who
若濟	/d͡zioʔ⁴⁻²¹.t͡soi¹¹/	how much
若久	/d͡zioʔ⁴⁻²¹.ku⁵²/	how long
乜個	/miʔ²¹⁻⁴.kai⁵⁵/	what
𫢗時	/tiaŋ³³.si⁵⁵/	when
底塊	/ti¹¹.ko²¹³/	where
做呢	/t͡so²¹³⁻⁵⁵.ni⁵⁵/	why
做呢	/t͡so²¹³⁻⁵⁵.ni⁵⁵/	how
底個	/ti¹¹.kai⁵⁵/	which
只塊	/t͡si⁵³⁻³⁵.ko²¹³/	here
許塊	/hɯ⁵³⁻³⁵.ko²¹³/	there
只個	/t͡si⁵³⁻³⁵.kai¹¹/	this
許個	/hɯ⁵³⁻³⁵.kai¹¹/	that
只撮	/t͡si⁵³⁻³⁵.t͡sʰoʔ²¹/	these
許撮	/hɯ⁵³⁻³⁵.t͡sʰoʔ²¹/	those
照生	/t͡sĩõ²¹³⁻⁵⁵.sẽ³³/	like this
向生	/hĩõ²¹³⁻⁵⁵.sẽ³³/	like that

==== Nouns ====
Pontianak Teochew	IPA pronunciations	Definition
飯	/peŋ¹¹/	rice
麵	/mi¹¹/	noodle
卵	/nɯŋ³⁵/	egg
果子	/kũẽ⁵³⁻³⁵.t͡si⁵³/	fruit
地豆	/ti¹¹.tau¹¹/	peanut
弓蕉	/keŋ³³.t͡sio³³/	banana
蔬菜	/t͡sʰẽ³³.t͡sʰai²¹³/	vegetable
豆乾	/tau¹¹.kũã³³/	tofu
狗	/kau⁵³/	dog
貓	/ŋiãu³³/	cat
鳥	/t͡siau⁵³/	bird
豬	/tɯ³³/	pig
厝	/t͡sʰu²¹³/	house
灶下	/t͡sau²¹³⁻⁵⁵.e³⁵/	kitchen
灶頭	/t͡sau²¹³⁻⁵⁵.tʰau⁵⁵/	kitchen
房間	/pʰaŋ⁵⁵⁻¹¹.keŋ³³/	room
鼻	/pʰĩ¹¹/	nose
嘴	/t͡sʰui²¹³/	mouth
心肝頭	/sim³³.kũã³³.tʰau⁵⁵/	chest
跤	/kʰa³³/	leg
耳	/hĩ³⁵/	ear
目	/mak⁴/	eye
學校	/hak⁴⁻²¹.hau¹¹/	school
學生	/hak⁴⁻²¹.seŋ³³/	student
跤車	/kʰa³³.t͡sʰia³³/	bicycle
鋪	/pʰou³³/	shop
儂客	/naŋ⁵³⁻³⁵.kʰeʔ²¹/	customer
頭家	/tʰau⁵⁵⁻¹¹.ke³³/	boss
生理	/seŋ³³.li⁵³/	business
鞋	/oi⁵⁵/	shoe
衫褲	/sã³³.kʰou²¹³/	clothes
目鏡	/mak⁴⁻²¹.kĩã²¹³/	glasses
帽	/bo¹¹/	hat

==== Verbs ====
Pontianak Teochew	IPA pronunciations	Definition
睇	/tʰõĩ⁵³/,	to see
聽	/tʰiã³³/	to listen
呾話	/tã²¹³⁻⁵⁵.ue¹¹/	to talk
笑	/t͡sʰio²¹³/	to laugh
哭	/kʰau²¹³/	to cry
鼻	/pʰĩ¹¹/	to smell
徛	/kʰia³⁵/	to stand
坐	/t͡so⁵³/	to sit
行	/kĩã⁵⁵/	to walk
走	/tsau⁵³/	to run
踏	/taʔ⁴/	to step
喊	/ham²¹³/	to call
食	/t͡siaʔ⁴/	to eat
食	/t͡siaʔ⁴/	to drink
啉	/nim³³/	to drink
開車	/kʰui³³.t͡sʰia³³/	to drive a vehicle
駛車	/sai⁵³⁻³⁵.t͡sʰia³³/	to drive a vehicle
噠浪	/tak²¹⁻⁴.nŋ¹¹/	to waste
休息	/hĩũ³³.sek²¹/	to rest
歇乏	/hiaʔ²¹⁻⁴.hek⁴/	to rest
泅水	/siu⁵⁵⁻¹¹.t͡sui⁵³/	to swim
灇浴	/t͡saŋ⁵⁵⁻¹¹.ek⁴/	to shower
夗	/uk⁴/	to sleep
做夢	/t͡so²¹³⁻⁵⁵.maŋ¹¹/	to dream
轉內	/tɯŋ⁵³⁻³⁵.lai³⁵/	to go home
耍	/sɯŋ⁵³/	to play
起頭	/kʰi⁵³⁻³⁵.tʰau⁵⁵/	to start
捔掉	/kak⁴⁻²¹.tiau¹¹/	to throw
生病	/sẽ³³.pẽ¹¹/	to be sick
儂孬	/naŋ⁵³⁻¹¹.mo⁵³/	to be sick
買物囝	/boi⁵³⁻³⁵.mueʔ⁴.kĩã⁵³/	to go shopping
乞	/kʰeʔ²¹/	to give
詖涼詖熱	/pʰueʔ⁴⁻²¹.liaŋ⁵⁵⁻¹¹.pʰueʔ⁴⁻²¹.d͡zuaʔ⁴/	to chat
相輔	/sio³³.hu³⁵/	to help
挈	/kʰioʔ⁴/	to get

==== Adjectives ====
Pontianak Teochew	IPA pronunciations	Definition
光	/kɯŋ³³/	bright
暗	/am²¹³/	dark
好	/ho⁵³/	good
孬	/mo⁵³/	bad
惡	/oʔ²¹/	hard
易	/koi¹¹/	easy
少	/t͡sie⁵³/	few
濟	/t͡soi¹¹/	many
滇	/tĩ³⁵/	full
大	/tua¹¹/	big
细	/soi²¹³/	small
懸	/kũĩ⁵⁵/	tall
矮	/oi⁵³/	short
清氣	/t͡sʰeŋ³³.kʰi²¹³/	clean
垃圾	/naʔ²¹⁻⁴.sap²/	dirty
凄疑	/t͡sʰi³³.ɡi⁵⁵/	dirty
鏖糟	/o³³.t͡so³³/	dirty
鬧熱	/lau¹¹.d͡ziaʔ⁴/	bustling
歡喜	/hũã³³.hi⁵³/	happy
雅	/ŋiã⁵³/	beautiul
老	/lau³⁵/	old
後生	/hau³⁵⁻¹¹.sẽ³³/	young
趣味	/t͡sʰu²¹³⁻⁵⁵.bi¹¹/	interesting
小禮	/siau⁵³⁻³⁵.li⁵³/	shy
氣	/kʰi²¹³/	angry
擔心	/tam³³.sim³³/	anxious
特別	/tek⁴⁻²¹.piak⁴/	special

== See also ==
- Teochew people
- Teochew Min
- Swatow dialect
- Pontianak Hakka

== Bibliography ==
- Peng, Anne Elise (2012). Aspects of the Syntax of Indonesian Teochew (PhD thesis). University of Delaware. ISBN 978-1-267-96938-5. ProQuest 1318842504.
- Thamrin, Lily (2008). 印尼坤甸潮州方言词汇研究 [Research of Indonesian Pontianak Chaozhou Dialect Vocabulary] (PhD thesis) (in Chinese). Beijing Language and Culture University.
- Thamrin, Lily (30 December 2020). "Phonological Description of Teochew Dialect in Pontianak West Kalimantan". Lingua Cultura. 14 (2): 195–201. doi:10.21512/lc.v14i2.6600. ISSN 2460-710X.
- Thamrin, Lily (2020). "印尼坤甸潮州华人的词汇变迁" [Vocabulary Changes of Teochew Chinese in Pontianak, Indonesia]. Chaozhou-Shantou Culture Research (in Chinese). 1 (23). Beijing: Social Sciences Academic Press: 169–180. ISBN 978-7520-1977-48.
- Veniranda, Yohana (2015). Perfective Aspect and Negation in Pontianak Teochew (PhD thesis). University of Delaware.
