= Hailu dialect =

Hakka dialect of Guangdong, China

- Hoiliuk dialect
- 海陆腔 / 海陸腔 海陆客语 / 海陸客語
- Native to: China, Taiwan and Indonesia
- Region: Shanwei, Guangdong; Hsinchu County, Hsinchu City, Taoyuan, Hualien County, and Miaoli County, Taiwan; West Kalimantan, Indonesia
- Language family: Sinitic: Chinese; Hakka; Hailu dialect
- Writing system: Chinese characters Pha̍k-fa-sṳ; Hakka Pinyin System

Official status
- Official language in: Taiwan
- Regulated by: Hakka Affairs Council

Language codes
- ISO 639-3: –
- Glottolog: hail1247

The Hailu dialect (simplified Chinese: 海陆腔; traditional Chinese: 海陸腔; pinyin: Hǎilù qiāng; Hailu Hakka Romanization System: hoi´ liug` kiong`), also known as the Hoiluk dialect or Hailu Hakka (simplified Chinese: 海陆客语; traditional Chinese: 海陸客語; pinyin: Hǎilù Kèyǔ), is a dialect of Hakka Chinese that originated in Shanwei, Guangdong. It is also the second most common dialect of Hakka spoken in Taiwan.

== Classification ==
The first edition of the Language Atlas of China places the Hakka dialects spoken in Haifeng and Lufeng into the Xin–Hui cluster (新惠小片; Xīn-Huì xiǎopiàn) of the Yue–Tai subgroup (粤台片; 粵臺片; Yuè-Tái piàn) of Hakka. In the second edition, it is given its own subgroup known as the Hai–Lu subgroup (海陆片; 海陸片; Hǎi-Lù piàn) separate from the Yue–Tai subgroup.

Chang Song-hing and Zhuang Chusheng propose that it should be grouped as the Hai–Lu cluster (海陆小片; 海陸小片; Hǎi-Lù xiǎopiàn) of the Mei–Shao subgroup (梅韶片; Méi-Sháo piàn).

== Distribution ==
In China, the Hailu dialect is spoken in Shanwei, Guangdong, particularly in Haifeng, Lufeng, and Luhe. As of 2012, there are around 1.18 million speakers of the dialect in these three areas.

In Taiwan, it is spoken in Hsinchu County (Xinfeng, Xinpu, Hukou, Qionglin, Hengshan, Guanxi, Beipu, Baoshan, Emei, and Zhudong), Hsinchu City (Xiangshan), Taoyuan (mostly in Guanyin, Xinwu, and Yangmei; also pockets in Pingzhen, Zhongli, and Longtan), Hualien County (Ji'an, Shoufeng, Guangfu, Yuli, Ruisui, and Fenglin), and Miaoli County (Toufen, Sanwan, Nanzhuang, Xihu, Houlong, Zaoqiao, Tongxiao, and Tongluo). In 2013, 41.5% of Hakka people in Taiwan were reported to be able to communicate in the Hailu dialect.

In Indonesia, a local variety of Hakka, that is loosely based on the Hailu dialect, is widely spoken in northern West Kalimantan, including Singkawang, Sambas, and Pemangkat.

== Phonology ==
=== Tones ===
The Hailu dialect has seven lexical tones:

Tone name		dark level (阴平 / 陰平)	light level (阳平 / 陽平)	rising (上声 / 上聲)	dark departing (阴去 / 陰去)	light departing (阳去 / 陽去)	dark entering (阴入 / 陰入)	light entering (阳入 / 陽入)
Example		夫	扶	府	富	护 / 護	福	服
Tone letter	Hetian, Luhe	˥˧ (53)	˥ (55)	˨˩˧ (213)	˧˩ (31)	˨ (22)	˧˦ (34)	˥˦ (54)
Tone letter	Hsinchu	˥˧ (53)	˥ (55)	˨˦ (24)	˩ (11)	˧ (33)	˥ (5)	˨ (2)
