= Meixian Hakka =

Meixian Hakka may refer to:

- Meixian dialect, a variety of the Hakka Chinese language
- Meixian Hakka F.C., a former name of the now-dissolved Guangdong South China Tiger F.C. football team in China
