= Meixian dialect =

Dialect of Hakka Chinese

Meixian
- 梅縣話
- Pronunciation: [moi˩ jan˥ fa˥˧]
- Native to: Guangdong, Taiwan, Malaysia, Singapore, Thailand, Indonesia
- Region: Meixian
- Language family: Sino-Tibetan: Sinitic; Chinese; Hakka; Yue-Tai Hakka; Mei-Hui section; Meixian
- Writing system: Chinese characters

Language codes
- ISO 639-3: –
- Glottolog: yuet1238
- Linguasphere: 79-AAA-gam

The Meixian dialect (Chinese: 梅縣話; Pha̍k-fa-sṳ: Mòi-yan-fa; IPA: [moi˩ jan˥ fa˥˧]), also known as Moiyan dialect, as well as Meizhou dialect (梅州話), or Jiaying dialect and Gayin dialect, Kayin dialect is the prestige dialect of Hakka Chinese. It is named after Meixian District, Meizhou, Guangdong. Sixian dialect (in Taiwan) is very similar to Meixian dialect.

== Phonology ==
=== Initials ===
There are two series of stops and affricates in Hakka, both voiceless: tenuis /p t ts k/ and aspirated /pʰ tʰ tsʰ kʰ/.

		Labial	Dental	Palatal	Velar	Glottal
Nasal		/m/ ⟨m⟩	/n/ ⟨n⟩	[ɲ] ⟨ng(i)⟩*	/ŋ/ ⟨ng⟩	
Plosive	tenuis	/p/ ⟨b⟩	/t/ ⟨d⟩	[c] ⟨g(i)⟩*	/k/ ⟨g⟩	(ʔ)
Plosive	aspirated	/pʰ/ ⟨p⟩	/tʰ/ ⟨t⟩	[cʰ] ⟨k(i)⟩*	/kʰ/ ⟨k⟩	
Affricate	tenuis		/ts/ ⟨z⟩			
Affricate	aspirated		/tsʰ/ ⟨c⟩			
Fricative		/f/ ⟨f⟩	/s/ ⟨s⟩	[ç] ⟨h(i)⟩*		/h/ ⟨h⟩
Approximant		/ʋ/ ⟨v⟩	/l/ ⟨l⟩			

* When the initials /k/ ⟨g⟩, /kʰ/ ⟨k⟩, /h/ ⟨h⟩, and /ŋ/ ⟨ng⟩ are followed by a palatal medial /j/ ⟨i⟩, they become [c̟]/[c] ⟨g(i)⟩, [c̟ʰ]/[cʰ] ⟨k(i)⟩, [ç] ⟨h(i)⟩, and [ɲ̟]/[ɲ] ⟨ng(i)⟩, respectively.

=== Rimes ===
Moiyan Hakka has seven vowels, /ɹ̩/, /i/, /e/, /a/, /ə/, /ɔ/ and /u/, that are romanised as ii, i, ê, a, e, o and u, respectively.

	Out	Front	Central	Back
Close	/ɹ̩/ ⟨ii⟩	/i/ ⟨i⟩		/u/ ⟨u⟩
Mid		/e̞/ ⟨ê⟩	/ə/ (/ɘ/) ⟨e⟩	/ɔ/ ⟨o⟩
Open			/a/ ⟨a⟩	

==== Finals ====
Moreover, Hakka finals exhibit the final consonants found in Middle Chinese, namely [m, n, ŋ, p, t, k] which are romanised as m, n, ng, b, d, and g respectively in the official Moiyan romanisation.

Finals of Meixian dialect
nucleus	medial	coda								
nucleus	medial	-∅	-i	-u	-m	-n	-ŋ	-p	-t	-k
-a-	∅-	a	ai	au	am	an	aŋ	ap	at	ak
-a-	j-	ja	jai	jau	jam	jan	jaŋ	jap	jat	jak
-a-	w-	wa	wai			wan	waŋ		wat	wak
-e-	∅-	e̞		e̞u	e̞m	e̞n		e̞p	e̞t	
-e-	j-	je̞				je̞n			je̞t	
-e-	w-	we̞				we̞n			we̞t	
-i-	∅-	i	wi		im	in		ip	it	
-o-	∅-	o	oi			on	oŋ		ot	ok
-o-	j-	jo	joi			jon	joŋ			jok
-o-	w-	wo				won	woŋ			wok
-u-	∅-	u				un	uŋ		ut	uk
-u-	j-		jui	ju		jun	juŋ		jut	juk
-ə-	∅-				əm	ən		əp	ət	
Syllabics		ɹ̩			m̩	n̩	ŋ̍			

=== Tone ===
Moiyan Hakka has six tones. The Middle Chinese fully voiced initial syllables became aspirated voiceless initial syllable in Hakka. Before that happened, the four Middle Chinese 'tones', ping, shang, qu, ru, underwent a voicing split in the case of ping and ru, giving the dialect six tones in traditional accounts.

Moiyan tones
Tone number	Tone name	Hanzi	Tone letters	number	English
1	yin ping	陰平	˦	44	high level
2	yang ping	陽平	˩	11	low level
3	shang	上	˧˩	31	low falling
4	qu	去	˥˧	53	high falling
5	yin ru	陰入	˩	2	low checked
6	yang ru	陽入	˥	5	high checked

These so-called yin-yang tonal splittings developed mainly as a consequence of the type of initial a Chinese syllable had during the Middle Chinese stage in the development of Chinese, with voiceless initial syllables [p- t- k-] tending to become of the yin type, and the voiced initial syllables [b- d- ɡ-] developing into the yang type. In modern Moiyan Hakka however, part of the Yin Ping tone characters have sonorant initials [m n ŋ l] originally from the Middle Chinese Shang tone syllables and fully voiced Middle Chinese Qu tone characters, so the voiced/voiceless distinction should be taken only as a rule of thumb.

Hakka tone contours differs more as one moves away from Moiyen. For example, the Yin Ping contour is ˧ (33) in Changting and ˨˦ (24) in Sixian (四縣), Taiwan.

Entering tone

Hakka preserves all of the entering tones of Middle Chinese and it is split into two registers. Meixian has the following:

- 陰入 [ ˩ ] a low pitched checked tone
- 陽入 [ ˥ ] a high pitched checked tone

Middle Chinese entering tone syllables ending in [k] whose vowel clusters have become front high vowels like [i] and [e] shifts to syllables with [t] finals in modern Hakka as seen in the following table.

Character	Guangyun Fanqie	Middle Chinese reconstruction	Hakka	Main meaning in English
職	之翼切	tɕĭək	tsit˩	vocation, profession
力	林直切	lĭək	lit˥	strength, power
食	乗力切	dʑʰĭək	sit˥	eat, consume
色	所力切	ʃĭək	set˩	colour, hue
德	多則切	tək	tet˩	virtue
刻	苦得切	kʰək	kʰet˩	carve, engrave, a moment
北	博墨切	pək	pet˩	north
國	古或切	kuək	kuet˩	country, state

==== Tone sandhi ====
For Moiyan Hakka, the yin ping and qu tone characters exhibit sandhi when the following character has a lower pitch. The pitch of the yin ping tone changes from ˦ (44) to ˧˥ (35) when sandhi occurs. Similarly, the qu tone changes from ˥˧ (53) to ˦ (55) under sandhi. These are shown in red in the following table.

Moiyen tone sandhi
	+ ˦ Yin Ping	+ ˩ Yang Ping	+ ˧˩ Shang	+ ˥˧ Qu	+ ˩ʔ Yin Ru	+ ˥ʔ YangRu	+ Neutral
˦ Yin Ping +	˦.˦	˧˥.˩	˧˥.˧˩	˧˥.˥˧	˧˥.˩ʔ	˦.˥ʔ	˧˥.˧
˥˧ Qu +	˥˧.˦	˥.˩	˥.˧˩	˥.˥˧	˥.˩ʔ	˥˧.˥ʔ	˥.˧

The neutral tone occurs in some postfixes. It has a mid pitch.

== Internal variation ==
The Meixian dialect can be divided into four accents, which are:

Meicheng accent: Most of the townships in the central part of Meixian County (including present-day Meijiang District)

Songkou accent: Songkou, Longwen, Taoyao.

Meixi accent: Meixi.

Shejiang River accent: Shejiang River in the southwest of Meixian County.
