= Luhe County =

Luhe 陆河县
- County
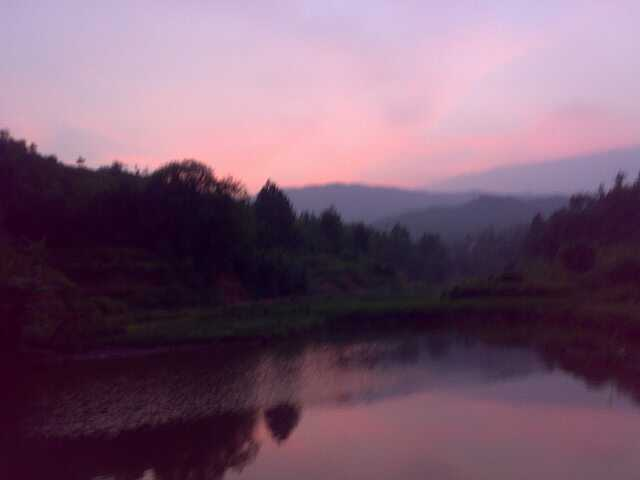

- Location in Guangdong
- Coordinates: 23°18′N 115°39′E
- Country: People's Republic of China
- Province: Guangdong
- Prefecture-level city: Shanwei

Area
  - Total: 986 km^{2} (381 sq mi)

Population (2020)
  - Total: 249,242
  - Density: 253/km^{2} (655/sq mi)
- Time zone: UTC+8 (China Standard)
- Website: www.luhe.gov.cn

Luhe County (simplified Chinese: 陆河县; traditional Chinese: 陸河縣; pinyin: Lùhé Xiàn) is a county of eastern Guangdong province, China. It is under the administration of Shanwei City. The majority of Luhe residents come from Hakka ancestry and speak a local dialect rooted in the Hakka language.

== Local Cuisine ==
Luhe is well known for the Hakka 'pounded tea' (Chinese: 擂茶; pinyin: Lei cha), as well as sweet puffed rice cakes and preserved fruit.
