= Tone name =

Names assigned to tone types in tonal languages

In tonal languages, tone names are the names given to the tones these languages use.

== Chinese ==
Pitch contours of the four Mandarin tones

In contemporary standard Chinese (Mandarin), the tones are numbered from 1 to 4. They are descended from but not identical to the historical four tones of Middle Chinese, namely level (Chinese: 平; pinyin: píng), rising (上; shǎng), departing (去; qù), and entering (入; rù), each split into yin (陰; yīn) and yang (陽; yáng) registers, and the categories of high and low syllables.

== Vietnamese ==
Northern Vietnamese (non-Hanoi) tones as uttered by a male speaker in isolation.

Standard Vietnamese has six tones, known as ngang, sắc, huyền, hỏi, ngã, and nặng tones.

== Thai ==
Thai has five phonemic tones: mid, low, falling, high and rising, sometimes referred to in older reference works as rectus, gravis, circumflexus, altus and demissus, respectively. The table shows an example of both the phonemic tones and their phonetic realization, in the IPA.

Thai language tone chart

Tone	Thai	Example	Phonemic	Phonetic	Example meaning in English
mid	สามัญ	นา	/nāː/	[näː˧]	paddy field
low	เอก	หน่า	/nàː/	[näː˩] or [näː˨˩]	(a nickname)
falling	โท	หน้า	/nâː/	[näː˦˩]	face, front
high	ตรี	น้า	/náː/	[näː˦˥] or [näː˥]	maternal aunt or uncle younger than one's mother
rising	จัตวา	หนา	/nǎː/	[näː˨˩˦] or [näː˨˦]	thick

== See also ==
- Tone letter
- Tone number
- Archaic & modern four tones in Chinese
