= Culture of Taiwan =

- Traditional Chinese: 臺灣文化
- Simplified Chinese: 台湾文化
- Literal meaning: Taiwanese culture
Transcriptions
Standard Mandarin
- Hanyu Pinyin: Táiwān wénhuà
Southern Min
- Hokkien POJ: Tâi-oân bûn-hoà

The culture of Taiwan is a blend of Han Taiwanese and indigenous Taiwanese cultures. Despite the overwhelming Chinese cultural influence and minority indigenous Taiwanese cultural influence, Japanese culture has significantly influenced Taiwanese culture as well. The common socio-political experience in Taiwan gradually developed into a sense of Taiwanese cultural identity and a feeling of Taiwanese cultural awareness, which has been widely debated domestically.

Reflecting the continuing controversy surrounding the political status of Taiwan, politics continues to play a role in the conception and development of a Taiwanese cultural identity, especially in the prior dominant frame of a Taiwanese and Chinese dualism. In recent years, the concept of Taiwanese multiculturalism has been proposed as a relatively apolitical alternative view, which has allowed for the inclusion of mainlanders and other minority groups into the continuing re-definition of Taiwanese culture as collectively held systems of meaning and customary patterns of thought and behavior shared by the people of Taiwan.

== State cultural policy overview ==
=== Historical context ===
Taiwan's culture and cultural legacy has been largely shaped by the processes of imperialism and colonization as the structural and psychological effects of successive colonial projects have been integral to developing Taiwan's self-image and the evolution of both official and unofficial Taiwanese culture. For most of its colonized existence, Taiwan remained on the cultural margins, far from the centers of civil and cultural life of each regime, and with every regime change, Taiwan's cultural center shifted. At various times Taiwan's cultural center has been indigenous Taiwan, Amsterdam, Amoy (Xiamen), Qing-era Peking, Imperial Japan, postwar China and even, arguably, the United States.

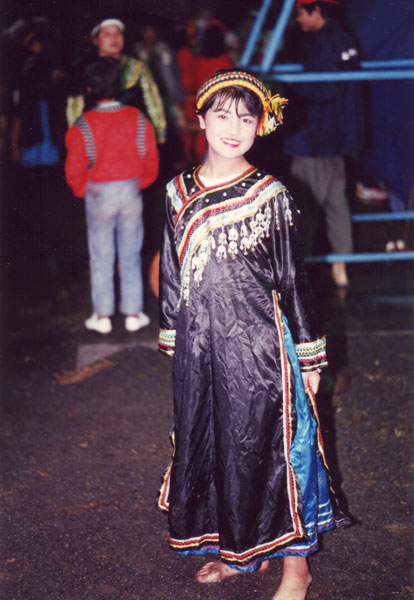
Bunun dancer in traditional aboriginal dress (1989)

Before the Qing Empire ceded Taiwan to Japan in 1895, Taiwan's culture was characterized by Qing frontier societies of Han farmers and highland Aborigines. Due to Taiwan's strategic location along East Asian trade routes, the Taiwanese were also exposed to cosmopolitan influences and the effects of European commerce. By the middle of the Japanese era (1895–1945), Taiwan had begun to shift from local to contemporary global culture, under the guidance of Japanese style "westernization". Beginning during Japan's build-up for war, Japan invigorated its policies to Japanize Taiwan for mobilization against the Allies. Japan's effort taught Taiwan's elite Japanese culture and language but did not largely interfere in religious organizations. When Japan's suppressive wartime policies were lifted following World War II, the Taiwanese were eager to continue with their prewar cosmopolitan activities. Japan's colonial legacy has shaped many of the customs and mannerisms of the Taiwanese. Japan's colonial legacy is still visible, due to Japan's massive effort in constructing Taiwan's economic infrastructure and industrial base, which is often cited as a major factor in Taiwan's rapid economic development.

== KMT era cultural policy ==
During the early postwar period the Chinese Nationalist Party (KMT) suppressed Taiwanese cultural expression and barred Taiwanese from cosmopolitan life except in the spheres of science and technology. The authoritarian KMT dominated public cultural space and Chinese nationalist networks became a part of cultural institutions, leaving little resource for cultural autonomy to grow.

Under the early KMT, Taiwan was realigned from a Japanese imperial center to a Chinese nationalist center, under the influence of KMT and American geo-political interests. Although American cultural activities were modest, they played a significant role in Taiwan's developing cultural scene. The KMT claimed a loss of morale led to "losing China" and thus the state issued a series of ideological reforms aimed to "retake" China, which became the major state cultural program of the time. The immediate preoccupation with losing China diverted long-term investment in the humanities and social sciences. On another level, the state's main objective was to "sinicize" the Taiwanese by teaching them Mandarin Chinese and Nationalist ideology through compulsory primary education.

By the late 1940s the KMT had eliminated dissent for its cultural policies. When the Taiwanese had resumed the cultural activities, which were outlawed by the Japanese in 1937, the Nationalist attitude was that the local Taiwanese had been Japanese "slaves" and would therefore have to complete a period of moral and ideological tutelage before they could enjoy their full rights as citizens of the Republic of China. The February 28 Incident destroyed Taiwan's urban elite and the arrival of the mainlander elite ensured Nationalist domination of urban cultural centers.

In 1953, Generalissimo Chiang Kai-shek issued his first major opinion on culture to complete Sun Yat-sen's Three Principles of the People, which included prescribing Nationalist curriculum for education, building facilities for intellectual and physical recreation and the major state cultural program of promoting anti-communist propaganda. In regard to Taiwanese cultural life, the major thrust was for "universalization" of education in Mandarin, which was enforced by law. Despite the hard-line Chinese control over culture, the Soviet advances in technology led to a new Nationalist focus on building closer cooperation with American universities and developing engineering programs. The American presence in Taiwan also encouraged Taiwanese to resume some politically, ethnically neutral cultural activities, which was expressed in a flourishing Taiwanese-language media market.

Between the 1960s and the 1980s Taiwan's culture was described by its media as the contrast between Taiwan (Free China) and China (Communist China), often drawing from the official tropes of Taiwan as a bastion of traditional Chinese culture, which had preserved "true" Chinese values against the "false" Chinese values of post Communist China. At the same time, Taiwanese cultural expressions were brutally suppressed by Chiang Kai-shek and the KMT. In response to the Cultural Revolution of China, the government of Taiwan began promoting the Chinese Cultural Renaissance (中華文化復興運動), with a myriad of programs designed to promote traditional Chinese culture to counter the communist movement on the mainland which aimed at uprooting the "Four Olds". These programs involved subsidized publication of Chinese Classics, the symbolic functions of the National Palace Museum, promoting famous prewar scholars to prominent positions in government and academic institutions, textbook and curriculum design with a focus on the official view of "traditional" Chinese culture and involvement in social and community events and the exemplification of Confucian ideology intertwined with Sun Yat-sen thought.

== Taiwanization ==
=== After 1975 ===
Bentuhua or Taiwanization/Taiwanese localization has become, arguably, the most important symbol of cultural change over the past twenty years. Bentuhua describes the social and cultural movement by the people of Taiwan to identify with Taiwan's unique mixed historical and cultural legacy. Bentuhua has often been associated with Taiwan Name Rectification Campaign, Taiwan Independence, and Taiwanese nationalism.

== Religion ==
Yin and Yang symbol of Taoism

The Dharmachakra represents the Noble Eightfold Path.

The prevalent form of religious belief in Taiwan is a blend of Buddhism, Taoism, and Chinese folk religion, including Chinese ancestral worship, Mazu worship, Wang Ye worship and Zhai Jiao Traditions. However, there are also large numbers of devotees to each of these belief systems.

Apart from the syncretic form of traditional Chinese folk religion, Humanistic Buddhism is the major distinguishing trait of modern Taiwanese Buddhism. Humanistic Buddhism traces its roots to Chinese monk Venerable Taixu (1890–1947), who promoted more direct contributions to society through the Buddhist community and was a significant influence for Venerable Yin Shun, who is generally considered to be the key figure who brought Humanistic Buddhism to Taiwan.

Christian churches have been active in Taiwan for many years, a majority of which are Protestant (with 2.6% of the population identifying themselves as Protestant) with Presbyterians playing a particularly significant role. The Presbyterian Church in Taiwan has been active in promoting human rights and the use of the spoken and written Taiwanese (see Pe̍h-ōe-jī), both during Japanese rule, as well as the martial law period of the Republic of China, during which the exclusive use of Mandarin was legally mandated. As such, the church has been associated with the Taiwan Name Rectification Campaign and the pan-green coalition.

Several Taiwanese religious organizations have extended their operations beyond the country. Several organizations, especially Buddha's Light International Association (Fo Guang Shan), Tzu Chi Foundation, Dharma Drum Mountain and Chung Tai Shan, have set up branch temples (or centers) and extended their humanitarian or missionary works around the world.

Buddhist-Taoist religious belief makes up 93%, Christian 4.5%, and others 2.5%.

== Food ==
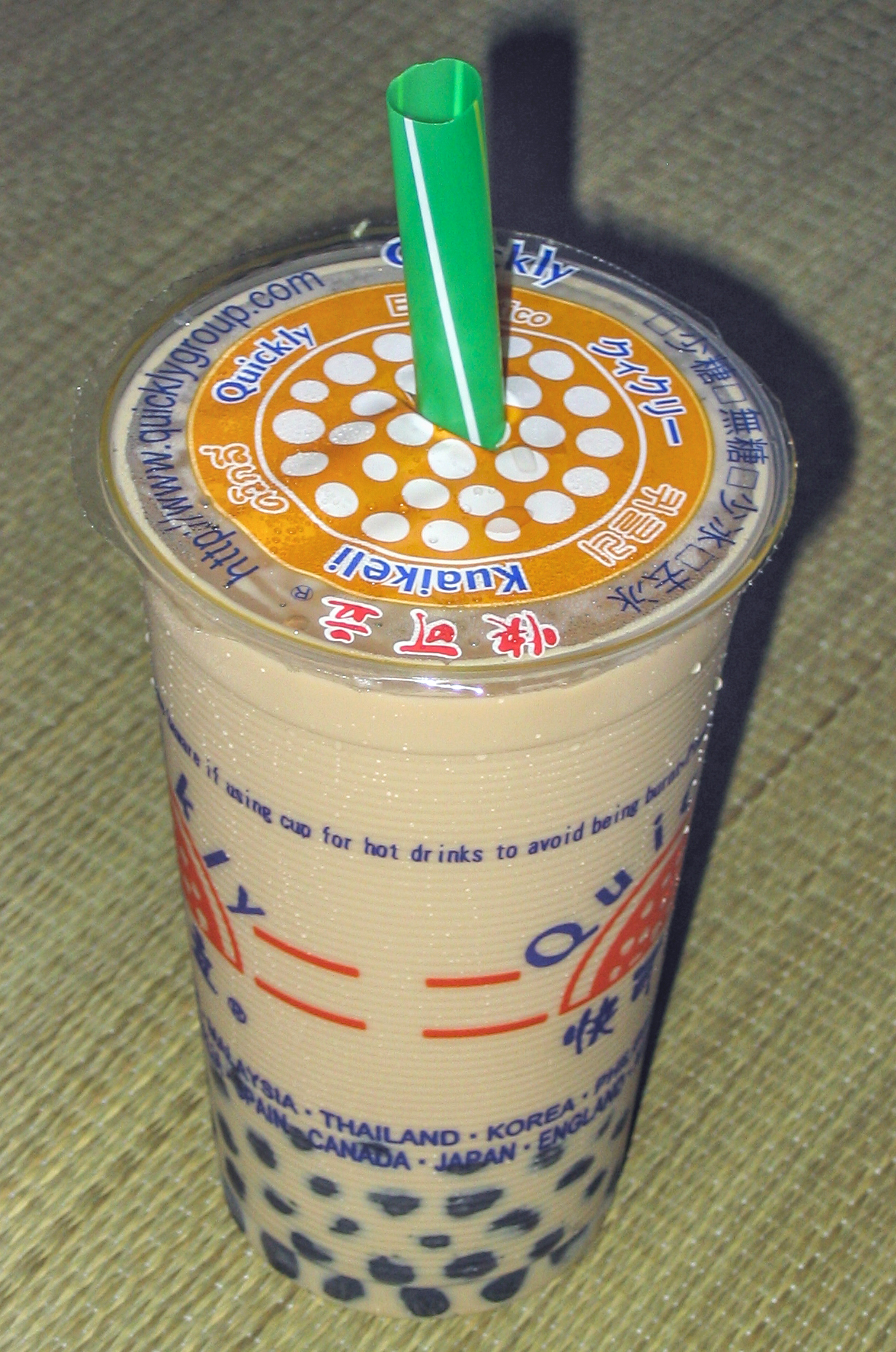
Pearl milk tea

Pearl milk tea (also known as bubble tea or boba) is a popular tea drink available in many parts of the world. A notable Japanese influence exists due to the period when Taiwan was under Japanese rule. Taiwanese cuisine itself is often associated with influences from mid to southern provinces of China, most notably from the province of Fujian, but influences from all of China can easily be found due to the large number of Chinese who immigrated to Taiwan during the retreat of the Republic of China to Taiwan. Originating in Taiwan during the 1980s, the beverage has since evolved from a local street food staple into a global cultural phenomenon. Modern adaptations, such as the introduction of brown sugar pearls, have further popularized Taiwanese tea culture internationally, expanding its footprint across global culinary markets.

== Languages and Communication ==
=== Languages ===
==== History of language development in Taiwan ====
Prior to the large-scale migration of Han Chinese from southern Fujian Province in the 1600s, most inhabitants of Taiwan spoke Indigenous Austronesian languages. With the arrival of these migrants, Hokkien and Hakka were introduced and gradually became widely spoken, especially the former. During the Japanese occupation of Taiwan (1895–1945), the colonial government promoted the use of Japanese in an effort to assimilate the local population. Following the defeat of the Nationalists by Mao Zedong’s Communist Party, Chiang Kai-shek and his government retreated to Taiwan 1949. They implemented policies that promoted Mandarin Chinese as the national language. Mandarin was strictly enforced in schools and workplaces, and children were often penalized for speaking their native tongues—whether Taiwanese Hokkien, Hakka, or Indigenous languages. The table below presents a timeline summarizing the major shifts in languages spoken in Taiwan throughout its history.

Time Period	Main Languages Spoken
Pre-1600s	Indigenous Austronesian Languages (or the Formosan Languages)
1600s–1800s	Indigenous Austronesion + Hokkien + Hakka
1895–1945	Above + Japanese (colonial rule)
1945–present	Mandarin Chinese (official), Hokkien, Hakka, Indigenous Languages

==== Language varieties ====
As a result of the Nationalist Party's assimilation efforts, the most widely spoken and de facto language in Taiwan is Mandarin Chinese, which was introduced to Taiwan by people who emigrated from mainland China after 1949. Taiwanese Hokkien, or "Taiwanese" for short, is spoken by about 70% of the population. A survey by National Taiwan Normal University revealed that 29.7% of Taiwanese speak Taiwanese Hokkien at home, while 68.6% speak Mandarin at home. The same survey also indicated that a higher percentage of older-aged groups, particularly those aged between 55-59, speak a local language more often than Mandarin Chinese.

The Hakka, who make about 13% of the population, speak the distinct Hakka language. The Formosan languages and the Yami language are the native languages of the indigenous Taiwanese, comprising about 2.3% of the island's population.

Standard Chinese is the official language and is almost universally spoken and understood. English is taught universally, starting in elementary school and all the way through high school.

Taiwanese Mandarin (guóyǔ or 國語), derived from Standard Chinese, is spoken at different levels according to the social class and situation of the speakers. Influenced by the Min-nan language, Taiwanese people may speak so-called Taiwanese-accented Mandarin (táiwān guóyǔ or 台灣國語), which may be linked to undesired personal qualities associated with old age/old fashion, inadequate education or low social status.

Some terms have different meanings in Taiwan and mainland China, such as: 土豆 (tǔdòu), which means peanut in Taiwan, but potato in China. There also exist differences in official pronunciations of a few words such as 垃圾, which is pronounced lèsè in Taiwan but lājī in China, with the former being derived from Shanghainese.

In Taiwan, traditional Chinese characters are generally used, rather than the simplified characters used predominantly in mainland China.

Language policies

Taiwan has always been a multilingual and culturally diverse society despite that language policies have often strictly regulated which languages can be used in formal settings. Below is a list of different historical periods where specific languages were actively promoted:

- Japanese occupation period (1895-1945): Under the Japanese rule, the Japanese language was promoted, while the local languages were suppressed.
- The KMT ruling period (1945-1987): Mandarin Chinese became the sole official language. School children speaking their home dialects (such as Hokkien, Hakka or indigenous languages) were discouraged or even punished.
- The democratic reform period (post-1987): A strong sense of Taiwanese identity surged during this time, which led to the recognition and promotion of local languages. Subsequently, organizations such as Council of Indigenous Peoples and Hakka Affairs Council were founded in 1996 and 2001 respectively, followed by the introduction of local languages into school curricula in 2004.
- Legal milestones: (1) Between 2017 and 2019, the National Languages Act recognized Hokkien, Hakka, indigenous languages, and sign language as equal to Mandarin, securing rights in education, public services, and media, and (2) In 2019, the Development of National Languages Act required the inclusion of local language classes, increased multilingual broadcasting, and provided funding to revitalize Hokkien, Hakka and indigenous languages.
- Current situation (2024–2025): Mandarin Chinese continues to dominate in schools, workplaces, and social settings. Teacher shortages and differences in language prestige make it challenging to fully implement policies that position multilingualism as a core aspect of Taiwan’s democratic identity. Consequently, the use of Hokkien is declining among younger generations, while Hakka and Indigenous languages remain endangered.
- Future direction (the 2030 Bilingual Policy): This policy was first announced by the National Development Council in December 2018, setting a goal to make Taiwan a bilingual nation in Mandarin and English by 2030. Implementation began in 2019, focusing on creating bilingual environments and promoting English proficiency through education and government services to strengthen international competitiveness. Despite its good intentions, the shortage of qualified bilingual teachers has limited the policy’s effectiveness.

=== Communication ===
==== Common communication practices ====
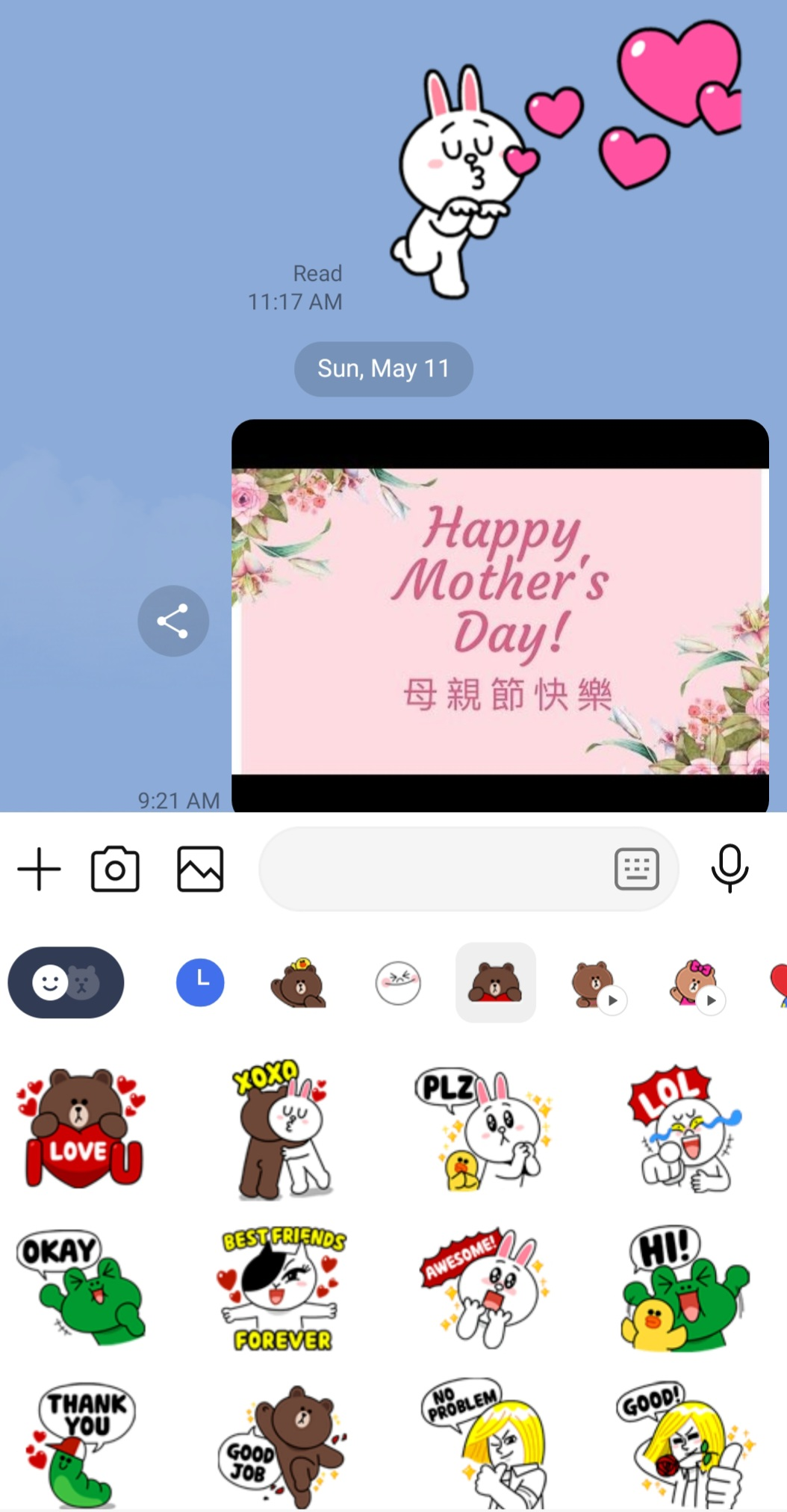
An example of a text message sent through the Line app, featuring sticker options.

Today, most people in Taiwan communicate through mobile apps (like WhatsApp, Line, Messenger), social media platforms (such as Facebook and Instagram), and traditional phone calls via cell phones or landlines. Among these, the Line app is the most popular, allowing users to send messages and Line stickers. Recent research suggests that Line stickers can help bridge gender expectations—especially for young men who may struggle to express vulnerable emotions—support evolving family communication and strengthen parent–child relationships. In addition, some mobile apps (e.g., Line, Facebook and Messenger), have been used for communication among Taiwanese residents during major national disasters, such as typhoons and earthquakes.

==== Code-switching between Mandarin and other languages ====
Because Taiwan is linguistically and culturally diverse, people of all ages tend to mix different languages in a conversation, especially outside of school or work. These mixed languages include Mandarin, Hokkien, Japanese, Hakka, and indigenous languages. This spoken code-switching is increasingly reflected in written communication, even though many local languages lack formal writing systems. When needed, however, the Taiwanese Romanization System and the Taiwanese Hakka Romanization System are used to represent sounds that do not have corresponding Mandarin characters. Due to the frequent use of code-switching and the evolving mix of languages, new colloquial expressions regularly emerge—often understood only by local speakers.

== Art ==
The artistic heritage of Taiwan is extremely diverse. Stonecutters of the Changbin culture began to make art on Taiwan at least 30,000 years ago. Around 5,000 years ago jade and earthenware works started to appear. Art was first institutionalized in Taiwan during the Japanese Colonial period and the establishment of public schools dedicated to the fine arts. The Japanese introduced oil and watercolor paintings to Taiwan and Taiwanese artists were heavily influenced by their Japanese counterparts. As was typical of colonel rulers Japanese did not establish tertiary institutions for art education in Taiwan, all students wishing to pursue an advanced degree in the arts had to travel to Japan to do so. When the Nationalists fled to Taiwan in 1949 they brought many of China's most prestigious artists with them. The Nationalists also established the first art colleges and universities in Taiwan. Along with Chinese influences the Nationalists also allowed the United States to establish a series of military bases in Taiwan, American pop culture and artistic ideas such as abstract expressionism were introduced to Taiwan by the Americans. Democratization in the late 1980s and the lifting of martial law granted Taiwanese artists freedom of expression for the first time in history. The economic boom of the '80s and '90s also saw the financial resources of Taiwanese museums and patrons increase significantly. By 1990 Taiwan was Asia's biggest art market. As Taiwan's art scene matured there began to be a greater specialization in exhibit spaces with dedicated museums for things like photography and ceramics opening. In the 21st century Taiwan's artistic community embraced new technologies and new mediums. While no longer the largest art market in Asia the tastes of Taiwan's collectors have matured and Taiwan remains the most cutting-edge art market in Asia.

== Media ==
Taiwan's freedom of press is guaranteed by the Constitution and its worldwide press freedom index ranks at 28 among 169 nations, as of 2026. Taiwan had been under martial law, with strict restrictions on the press and broadcasting, before political liberalization loosened restrictions in the 1980s.

== Sports ==
Popular sports in Taiwan include:

- Badminton
- Baseball
- Basketball
- Cheerleading
- Golf
- Martial arts
- Pool
- Swimming
- Table tennis
- Tennis
- Volleyball

Athletes from Taiwan compete in international sporting events, often under the banner of "Chinese Taipei" due to PRC's opposition to the use of "Taiwan" or "ROC" under such circumstances.

== Tea ==
Taiwanese tea culture, include tea arts, tea ceremony, and a very social way of enjoying tea. While the most common teas are oolongs, especially Taiwanese oolongs such as Iron Goddess and Alpine Oolong. However, black teas and green teas are also popular. Many of the classical arts can be seen in the tea culture, examples: calligraphy, flower arts, incense arts, and such.

== Recreation ==
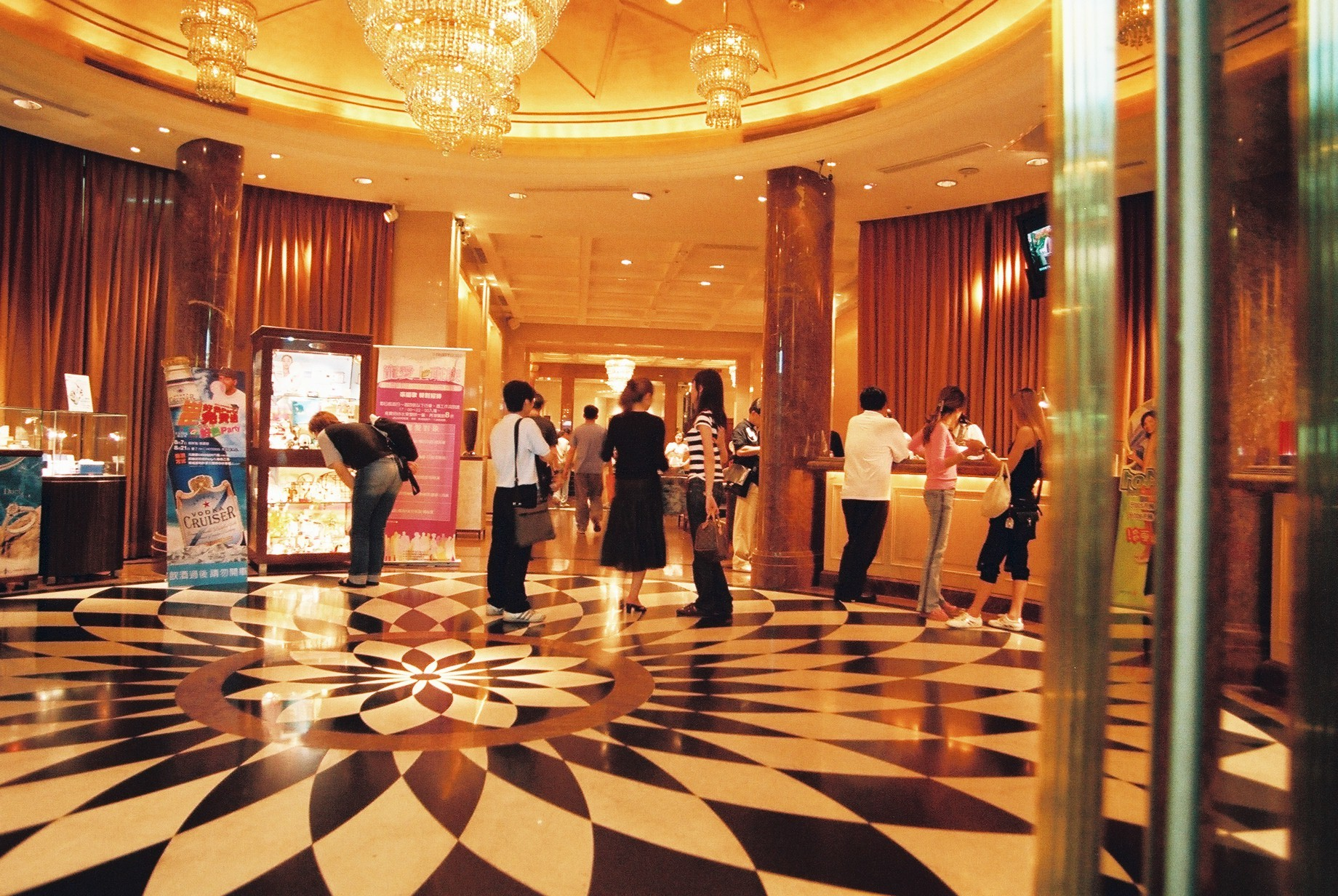
Entrance hall of a K-TV in Taipei

Karaoke is incredibly popular in Taiwan, where it is termed KTV (karaoke television). This is an example of something the Taiwanese have drawn, on scale, from contemporary Japanese culture. Pachinko is another example. During typhoons, many young Taiwanese will spend the day singing karaoke or playing mahjong. Many people enjoy watching miniseries collectively called Taiwanese drama.

Indoor shrimping has remained a popular form of recreation in Taiwan since the 1990s.

Since 1999, hot springs, known as wēnquán in Chinese and onsen in Japanese, have been making a comeback thanks to efforts by the government. Over 100 hot springs have been discovered since the Japanese introduced their rich onsen culture to Taiwan, with the largest concentration on the northernmost part of Taiwan island.

Anime and manga are very popular in Taiwan. Comics, including manga, are called manhua in Taiwan. It is common to see a manga rental shop or a manga store every couple of streets in larger cities.

== Convenience store culture ==
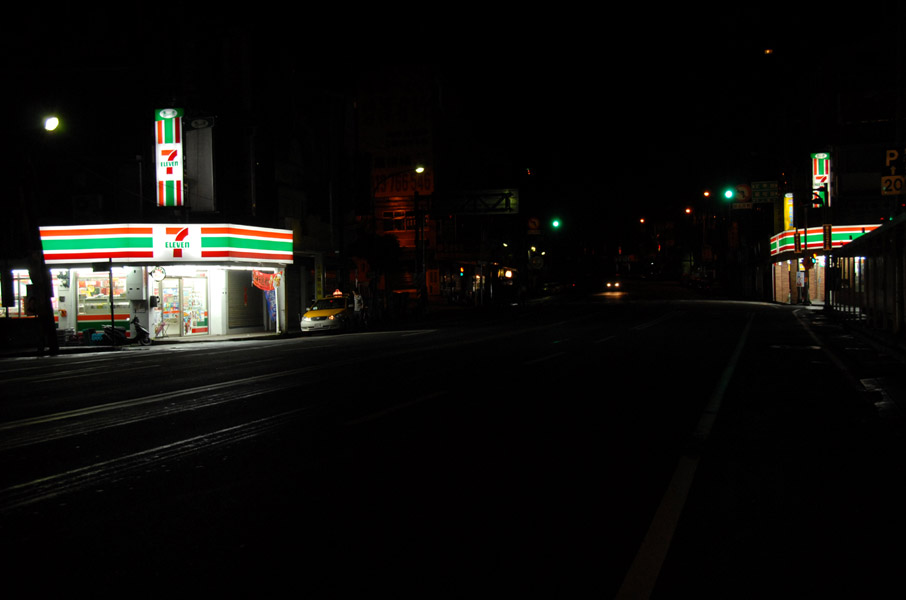
Two 7-Eleven stores opposite each other on a crossroad. Taiwan has the highest density of 7-Eleven stores per person in the world

Boasting over 9,200 convenience stores in an area of 35,980 km^{2} and a population of 22.9 million, Taiwan has the Asia Pacific's and perhaps the world's highest density of convenience stores per person: one store per 2,500 people or .0004 stores per person. As of 1 January 2009, Taiwan also has 4,800 7-Eleven stores, and thus the world's highest density of 7-Elevens per person: one store per 4,786 people or .000210 stores per person. In Taipei, it is not unusual to see two 7-Elevens across the street from or several of them within a few hundred meters of each other.

Because they are found in most areas within Taiwan, convenience stores in Taiwan provide services on behalf of financial institutions or government agencies such as collection of the city parking fee, utility bills, traffic violation fines, and credit card payments. Eighty-one percent of urban household shoppers in Taiwan visit a convenience store each week.

== Cram school culture ==
Taiwan, like its neighbors in East Asia, is well known for its buxiban (補習班), often translated as cram school, and literally meaning "make-up class" or "catch-up class" or to learn more advanced classes. Nearly all students attend some sort of buxiban, whether for mathematics, computer skills, English, other foreign languages, or exam preparation (college, graduate school, TOEFL, GRE, SAT, etc.). This is perpetuated by a meritocratic culture that measures merit through testing, with entrance into college, graduate school, and government service decided entirely on testing. This has also led to a remarkable respect for degrees, including PhDs and overseas Western degrees (US and Great Britain).

English teaching is a big business in Taiwan, with Taiwan, as part of its project to reinvigorate the Taiwan Miracle, aiming to become a trilingual country—fluent in Mandarin, Taiwanese, and English.

== Popular culture ==
Cell phones are very popular in Taiwan. Mobile penetration rate stands at just over 120%. Because of their high use, phones in Taiwan have many functions and are becoming cheaper.

Internet cafes are very popular with teenagers. They often sell food. Many gamers eat while using the internet. Many parents and teachers are concerned with the amount of time youth spend in the internet cafes.

One of the best known figures in Taiwanese cinema is director Ang Lee, who has also made movies in the West and has won an Academy Award. Some popular pop artists in Taiwan include Leehom Wang, Jay Chou, Jolin Tsai, and David Tao. Some of them have gained international fame and toured Asian countries like Japan, Malaysia and Singapore. Since Taiwan is well known for its entertainment scene, some of its TV stations have organised talent search to find new and young talents to join the big family of pop culture here. Some successful bands like S.H.E were formed in the talent search.

Hip-hop culture from the United States, the United Kingdom and Japan also flourished in Taiwan. J-pop, G-Unit and Eminem are also very popular as well. In this process, Taiwan produced several hip-hop artists, including Dog G, MC HotDog, Machi, and L.A. Boyz.

Taiwanization of the culture of Taiwan has been a trend since democratisation in the 1980s and 1990s. In 2000, after half a century of Chinese Kuomintang (KMT) party rule, the first ever democratic change of ruling parties in Taiwan occurred with the election of Chen Shui-bian and his Taiwan-centric Democratic Progressive Party (DPP), marking an important step towards Taiwanization. While generally the KMT, the other major political party, is also more open to promoting Taiwan's cultural autonomy than in the past, the DPP made Taiwanization a key plank in its political platform. The Chen administration's policies included measures designed to focus on Taiwan while de-emphasizing cultural and historical ties to China. These policies included changes such as revising textbooks and changing school curricula to focus more on Taiwan's own history to the exclusion of China, and changing the names of institutions that contain "China" to "Taiwan". This sometimes led to incongruities such as Sun Yat-sen being treated as both a "foreign" (Chinese) historical figure and as the "Father of the Country" (Republic of China). These policies are called Taiwanization but have been attacked by detractors as "desinicization", which explains why these policies are generally applauded by most ethnic Taiwanese and opposed by the KMT.

One phenomenon that has resulted from the Taiwanization movement is the advent of Taike subculture, in which people consciously adopt the wardrobe, language and cuisine to emphasize the uniqueness of popular, groundroots Taiwanese culture, which in previous times had often been seen as provincial and brutally suppressed by Chiang Kai-shek.

The Kuomintang took power in 2008 with the election of Ma Ying-jeou to the presidency. The new KMT administration has controversially sought to reverse some of the desinicizing policies of the Chen administration, to various degrees of public support. The restoration of the Chiang Kai-shek Memorial Hall to its former state has been generally supported. By contrast, a directive by the administration to foreign missions to henceforth refer to visits by foreign dignitaries as "visiting (cultural) China" has been rescinded after criticism from DPP legislators.

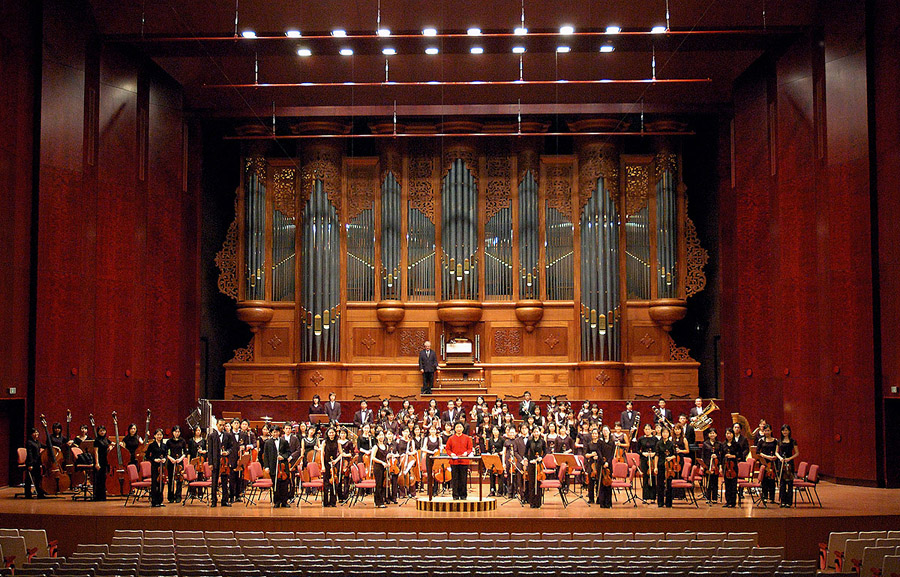
Apo Hsu and the NTNU Symphony Orchestra on stage in the National Concert Hall in Taipei and Play Saint-Saens's Organ Symphony No. 3

Since 1949, Taiwan had managed to develop itself into the center of Chinese pop culture (also known as "C-pop" or 中文流行文化). Today, the commercial Chinese music industry in the world (especially Mandopop and Taiwanese pop) is still largely dominated by Taiwanese pop artists. Successful Chinese pop artists from other countries (e.g. Stefanie Sun, JJ Lin from Singapore) are also trained, groomed and marketed in Taiwan. Chinese pop artists from other countries who wish to become successful usually have to go to Taiwan to develop their music career. Mandopop and Taiwanese (Hokkien) genre music continue to flourish in Taiwan today.

Ever since the 1990s, Taiwanese variety shows (綜藝節目) had grown from its home base in Taiwan to other parts of the world. Today, it is widely watched and enjoyed by the Overseas Chinese communities in countries such as Singapore, Malaysia, Indonesia, and the United States.

== See also ==
- Architecture of Taiwan
- Cinema of Taiwan
- Han Taiwanese
- Languages of Taiwan
- List of Taiwanese authors
- List of ethnic groups in Taiwan
- List of museums in Taiwan
- Performing arts in Taiwan
- Theater in Taiwan
- Music of Taiwan
- National Cultural Association of Taiwan
- Photography of Taiwan
- Religion in Taiwan
- Sports in Taiwan
- Taiwanese literature
- Taiwanese drama
- Taiwanese opera
- Glove puppetry
- Night markets in Taiwan
- Taipei Community Services Center (offers support services to the international community)
- Hokkien culture
- Taiwanese chicken-beheading rituals
