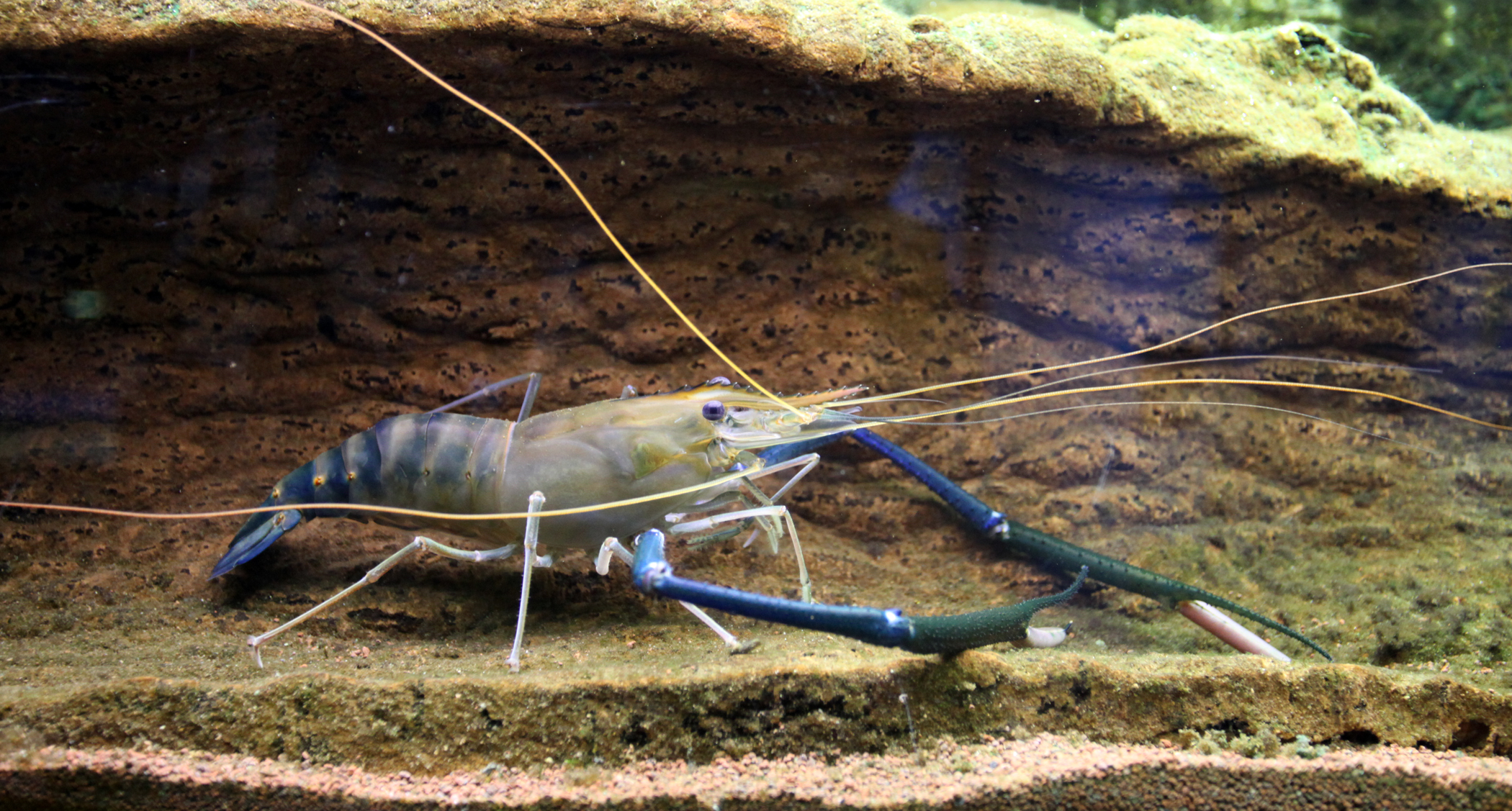

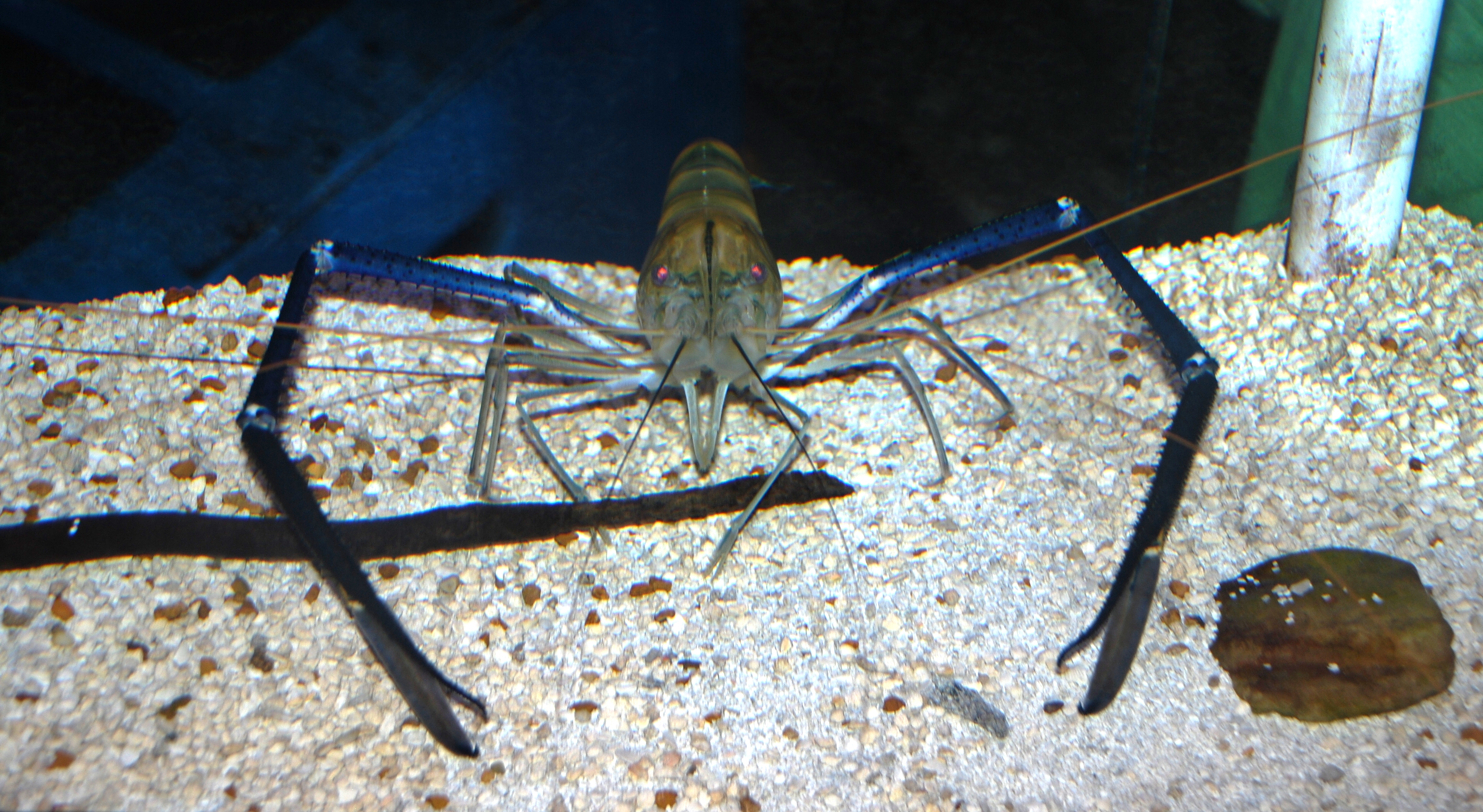

Conservation status
- Least Concern (IUCN 3.1)

Scientific classification
- Kingdom: Animalia
- Phylum: Arthropoda
- Clade: Pancrustacea
- Class: Malacostraca
- Order: Decapoda
- Suborder: Pleocyemata
- Infraorder: Caridea
- Family: Palaemonidae
- Genus: Macrobrachium
- Species: M. rosenbergii

Binomial name
- Macrobrachium rosenbergii De Man, 1879

Synonyms
- Palaemon rosenbergii De Man, 1879; Palaemon whitei Sharp, 1893; Palaemon d'acqueti Sunier, 1925; Macrobrachium dacqueti (Sunier, 1925); Macrobrachium rosenbergii schenkeli Johnson, 1973

= Macrobrachium rosenbergii =

Species of prawn

Macrobrachium rosenbergii is a commercially important species of palaemonid freshwater prawn. It is native throughout the tropical and subtropical areas of the Indo-Pacific region, from India to Southeast Asia and Northern Australia. While M. rosenbergii is considered a freshwater species, the larval stage of the animal depends on brackish water. Once the individual shrimp has grown beyond the planktonic stage and becomes a juvenile, it lives entirely in fresh water.

In English, it is commonly known as the giant river prawn, giant freshwater prawn, Malaysian prawn, freshwater scampi (India), or cherabin (Australia). Locally, it is known as golda chingri (Bengali: গলদা চিংড়ি) in Bangladesh and India, udang galah in Indonesia and Malaysia, uwáng or uláng in the Philippines, kung maenam (กุ้งแม่น้ำ) or kung kam kram (กุ้งก้ามกราม) in Thailand, and Thailand prawn in Southern China and Taiwan (Chinese: Tàiguó xiā 泰國蝦).

It is one of the biggest freshwater prawns in the world, and is widely cultivated in several countries for food. Due to accidental releases, the giant freshwater prawn has also been introduced to parts of Africa, China, Japan, New Zealand, the Americas, and the Caribbean.

== Description ==
M. rosenbergii can grow to a length over 30 cm (12 in), with total lengths of 34 cm (13 in) for males and 26 cm (10 in) for females. Females can be distinguished from males by their wider abdomens and smaller second pereiopods (walking legs), which in this species bear the major chelae (large pincers). The genital openings are found on the body segments containing the fifth pereiopods in males and the third pereiopods in females.

They are predominantly brownish in colour, but can vary. Smaller individuals may be greenish and display faint vertical stripes. The rostrum is very prominent and contains 11 to 14 dorsal teeth and 8 to 11 ventral teeth. The first pair of walking legs is elongated and very thin, ending in delicate claws (chelipeds), which are used as feeding appendages. The second pair of walking legs is much larger and more powerful, especially in males. The movable claws of the second pair of walking legs are distinctively covered in dense bristles (setae) that give them a velvety appearance. The colour of the claws in males varies according to their social dominance.

=== Morphotypes ===
Three different male morphotypes, which correspond to their social dominance, are widely recognized. The first stage is called "small male" (SM); this smallest stage has short, nearly translucent claws. If conditions allow, small males grow and metamorphose into "orange claws" (OC), which have large orange claws on their second chelipeds, which may have a length of 0.8 to 1.4 times their body size. OC males later may transform into the third and final stage, the "blue claw" (BC) males. These have blue claws, and their second chelipeds may become twice as long as their bodies. Senescent blue claw individuals are sometimes recognized as "old blue claws" (OBC), characterized by a smaller abdominal length compared to the carapace and major cheliped lengths.

Males of M. rosenbergii have a strict hierarchy; the territorial BC males dominate the OCs, which in turn dominate the SMs. The presence of BC males inhibits the growth of SMs and delays the metamorphosis of OCs into BCs; an OC keeps growing until it is larger than the largest BC male in its locale before abruptly transforming into the BC phase. All three male stages are sexually active, and females that have undergone their premating moult cooperate with any male to reproduce. BC males protect the females until their shells have hardened; OCs and SMs show no such behaviour.

== Life cycle ==
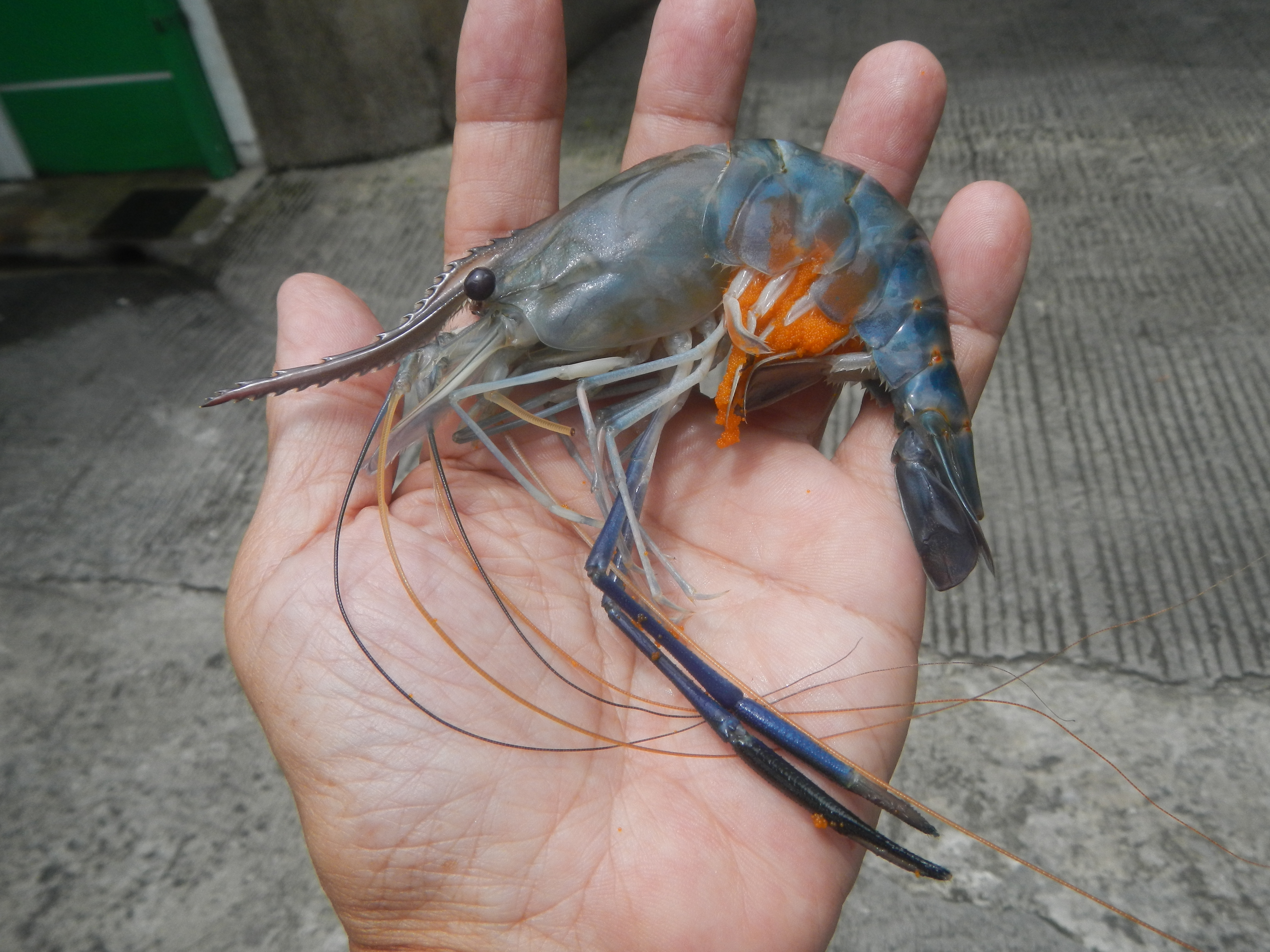
Individual with eggs

In mating, the male deposits spermatophores on the underside of the female's thorax, between the walking legs. The female then extrudes eggs, which pass through the spermatophores. The female carries the fertilised eggs with her until they hatch; the time may vary, but is generally less than 3 weeks. Females lay 10,000–50,000 eggs up to five times per year.

From these eggs hatch zoeae, the first larval stage of crustaceans. They go through several larval stages in brackish water before metamorphosing into post-larvae, at which stage they are 0.28–0.39 in (7.1–9.9 mm) long and resemble adults. This metamorphosis usually takes place about 32 to 35 days after hatching. These post-larvae then migrate back into fresh water.

The giant freshwater prawn lives up to 3 years of age.

== Relation to humans ==
M. rosenbergii is widely eaten in Southeast Asian countries, its native range. They are also commonly used in indoor shrimping venues. The species is aquacultured throughout the tropics.

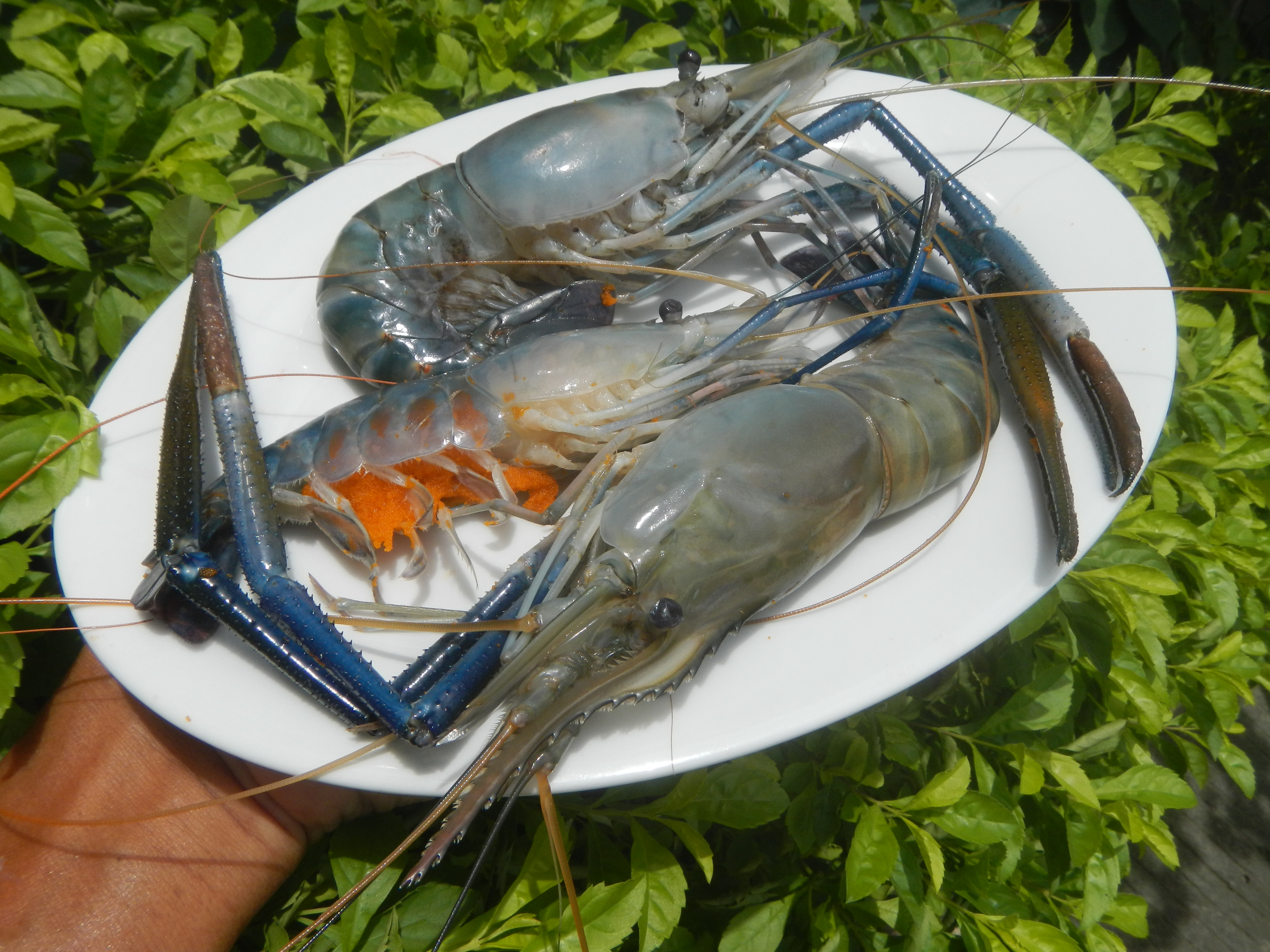
Raw

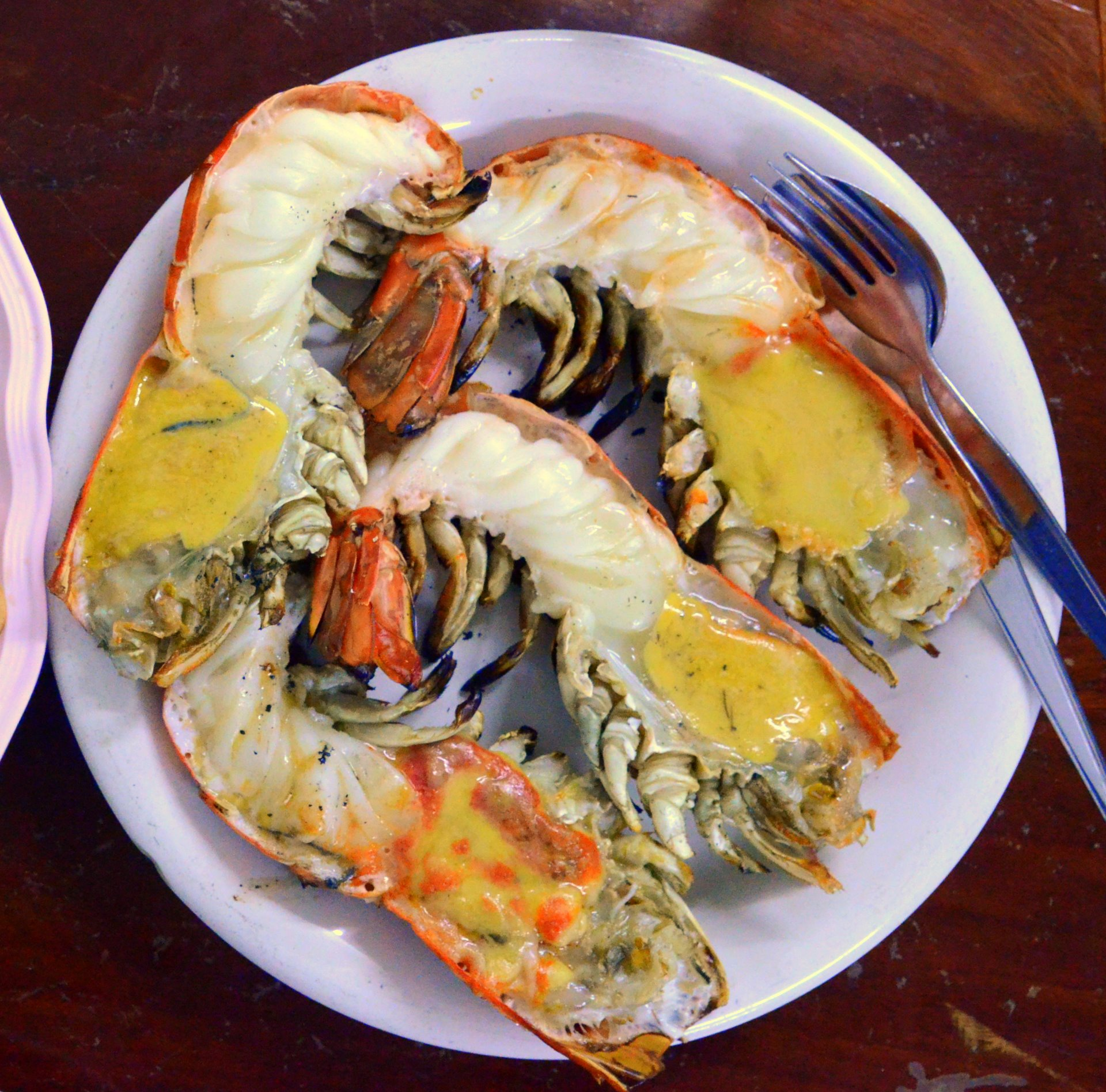
Grilled giant river prawns in Thai cuisine, each (whole) prawn weighing around 500 g

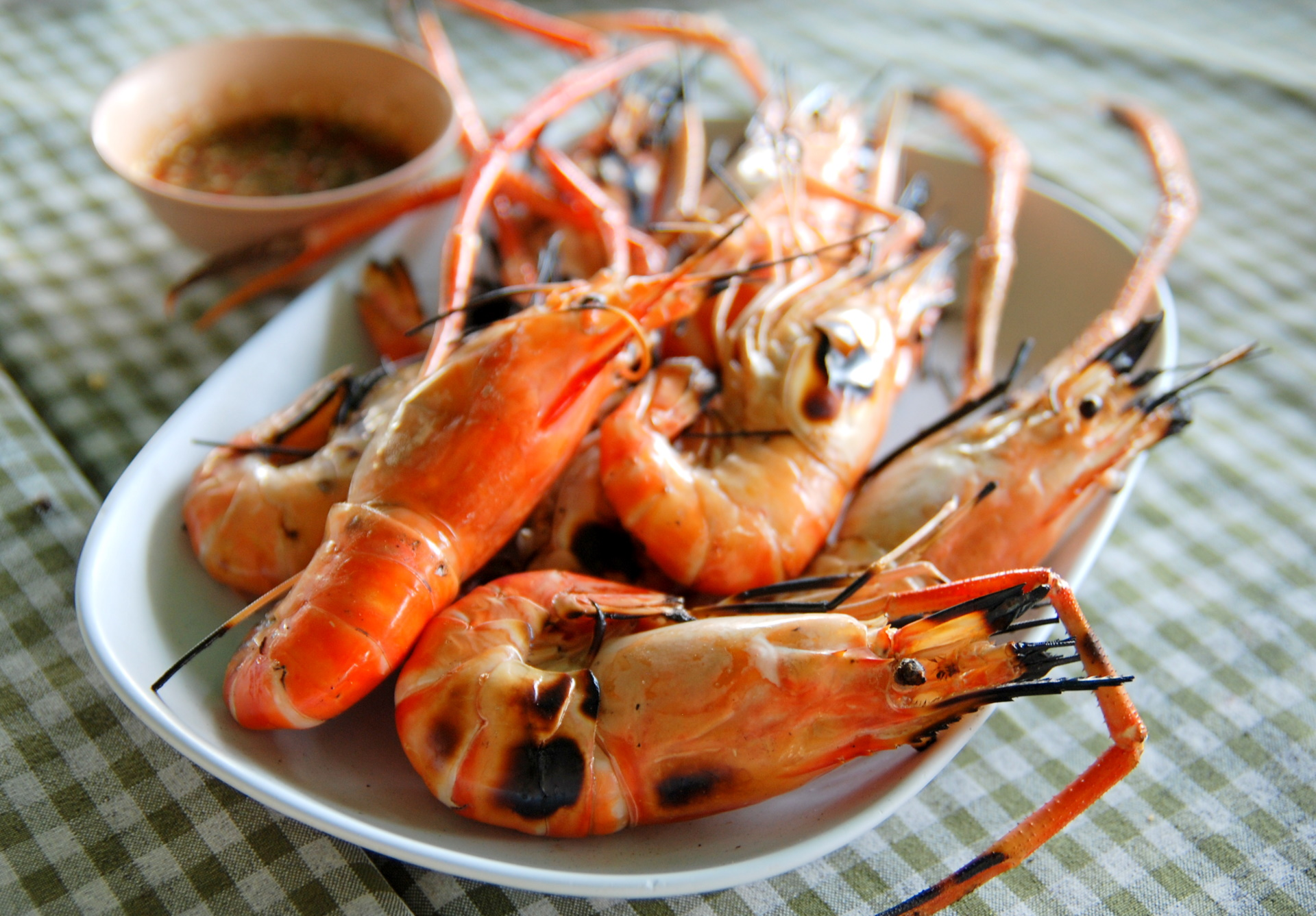
Thai kung yang, or grilled prawns

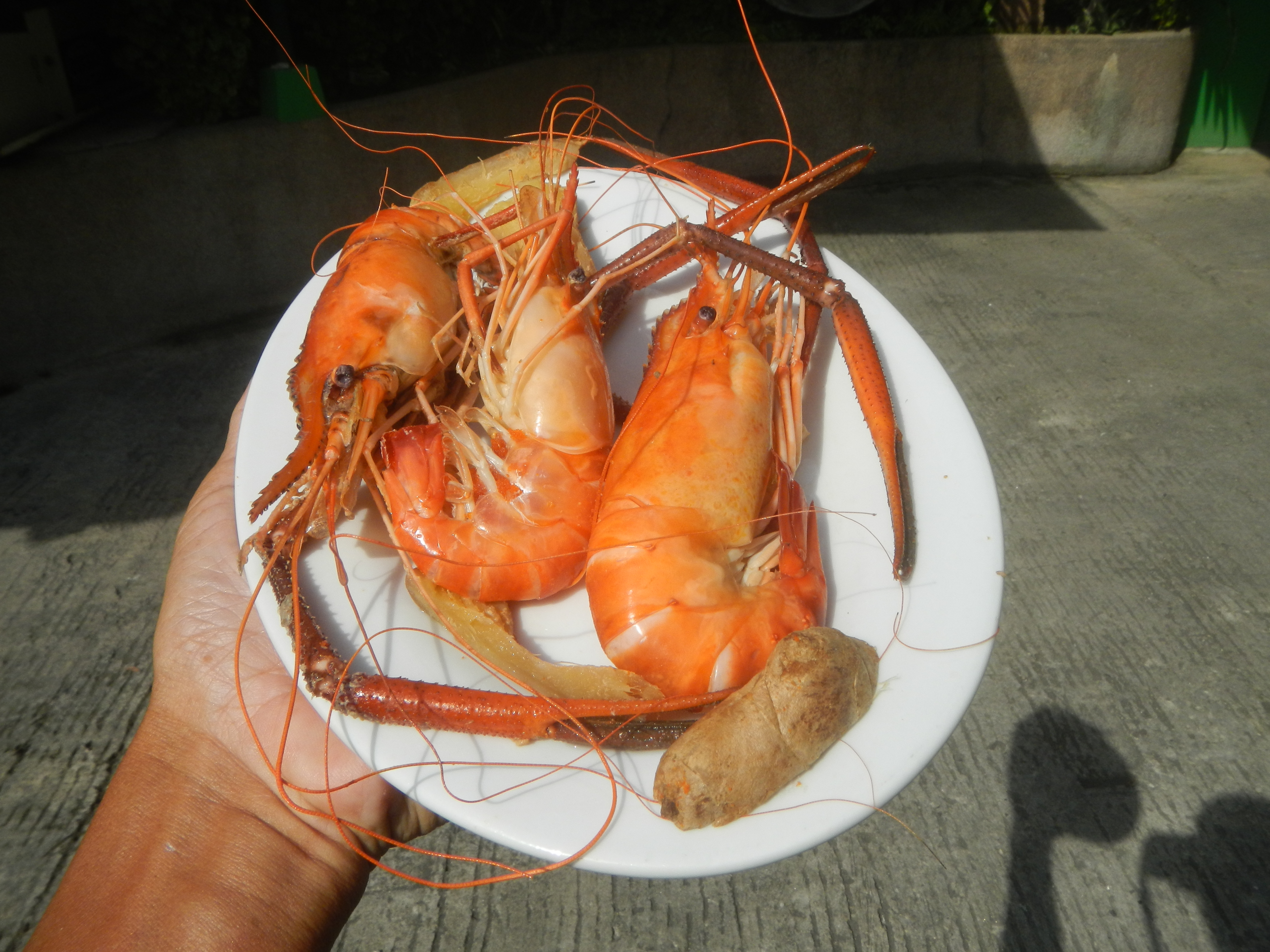
Cooked

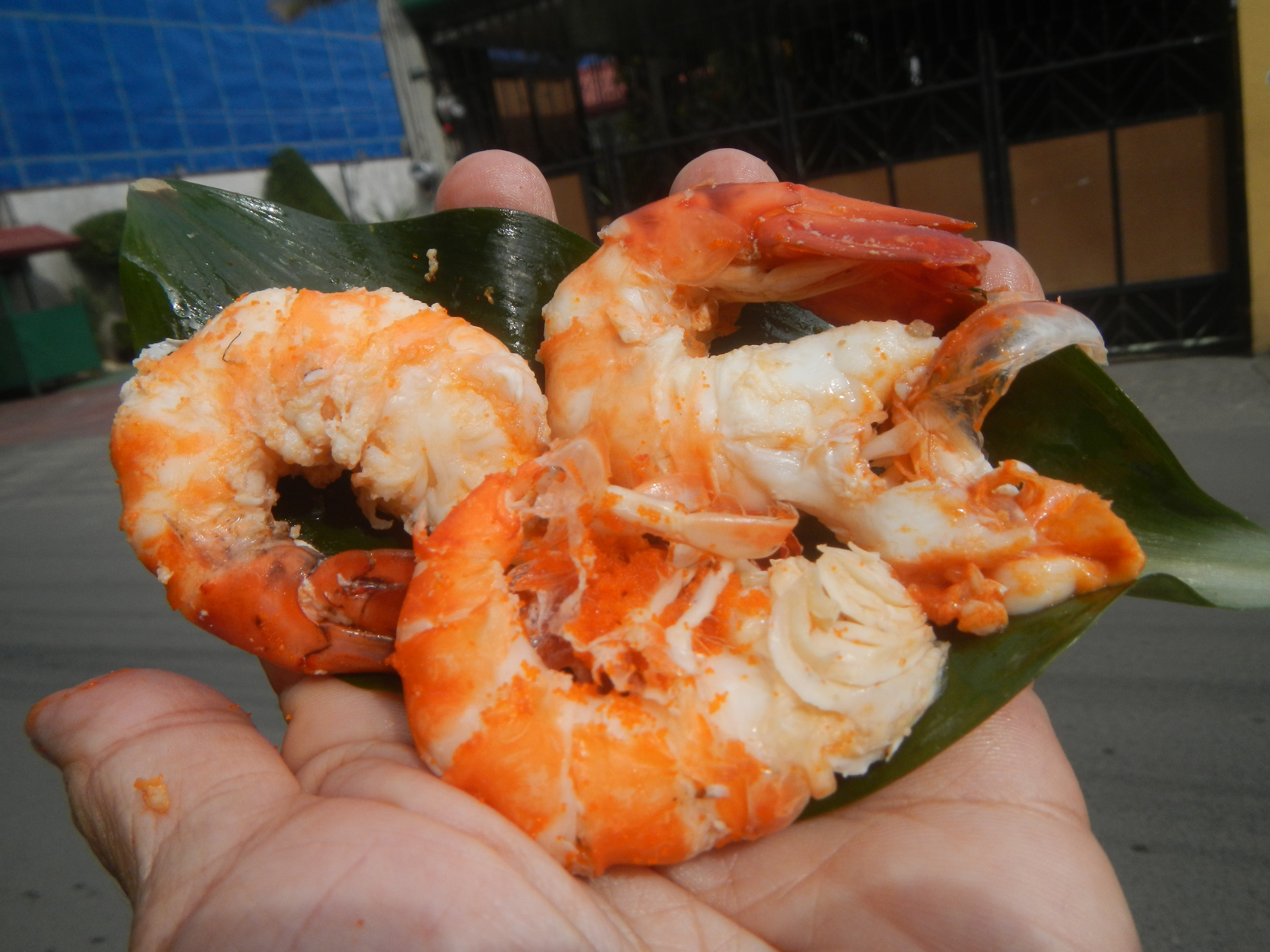
Peeled

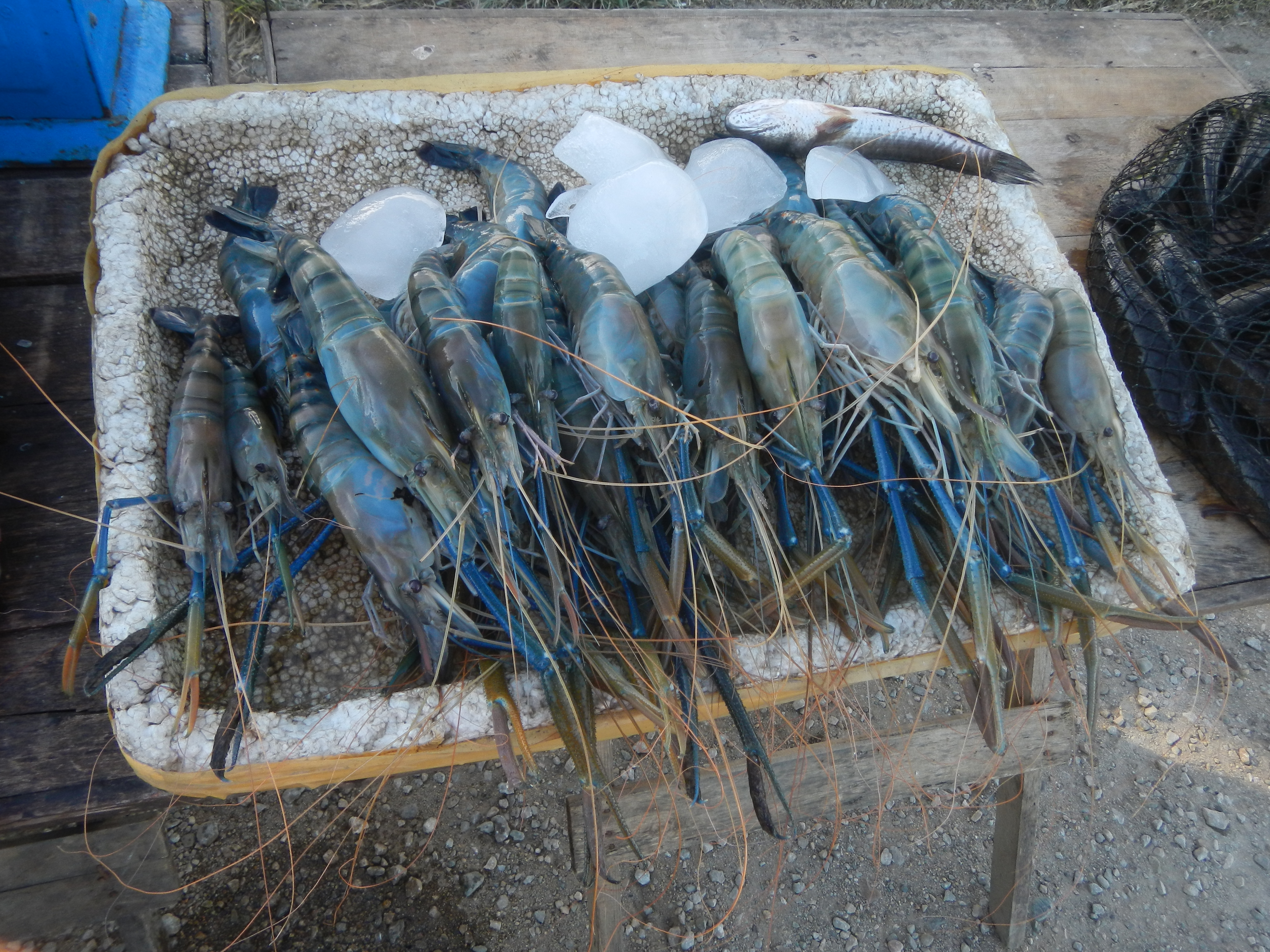
Sold in the Philippines

Capture (blue) and aquaculture (green) production of Giant river prawn (Macrobrachium rosenbergii) in thousand tonnes from 1950 to 2022, as reported by the FAO

== In research ==
Professor Amir Sagi and his research group at Ben-Gurion University of the Negev have studied the IAG physiological sexual switch in decapods and their associated gene expression. their research has also examined genetic functions related to crustacean investigating reproduction as well as genome editing in prawns using application of CRISPR.

The research group has also developed monosex biotechnologies, including the use of temporal RNA interference (RNAi) to produce all male crustacean populations. Monosex crustacean aquaculture technologies have been applied in countries including Vietnam, Thailand, China, Malaysia, Israel. Sagi is also a co-founder of Enzootic Ltd. a biotechnology focused on all-female crustacean culture.

Research has investigated the potential use of prawns as biocontrol agents for invasive and pest species. The Sagi lab development of monosex prawn that have been studied for use in biological control applications in various parts of the world. The Sagi laboratory has also developed monosex prawn technologies that have been studied for use in biological control applications in various parts of the world.
