= 2030 Bilingual Nation =

Taiwanese government policy

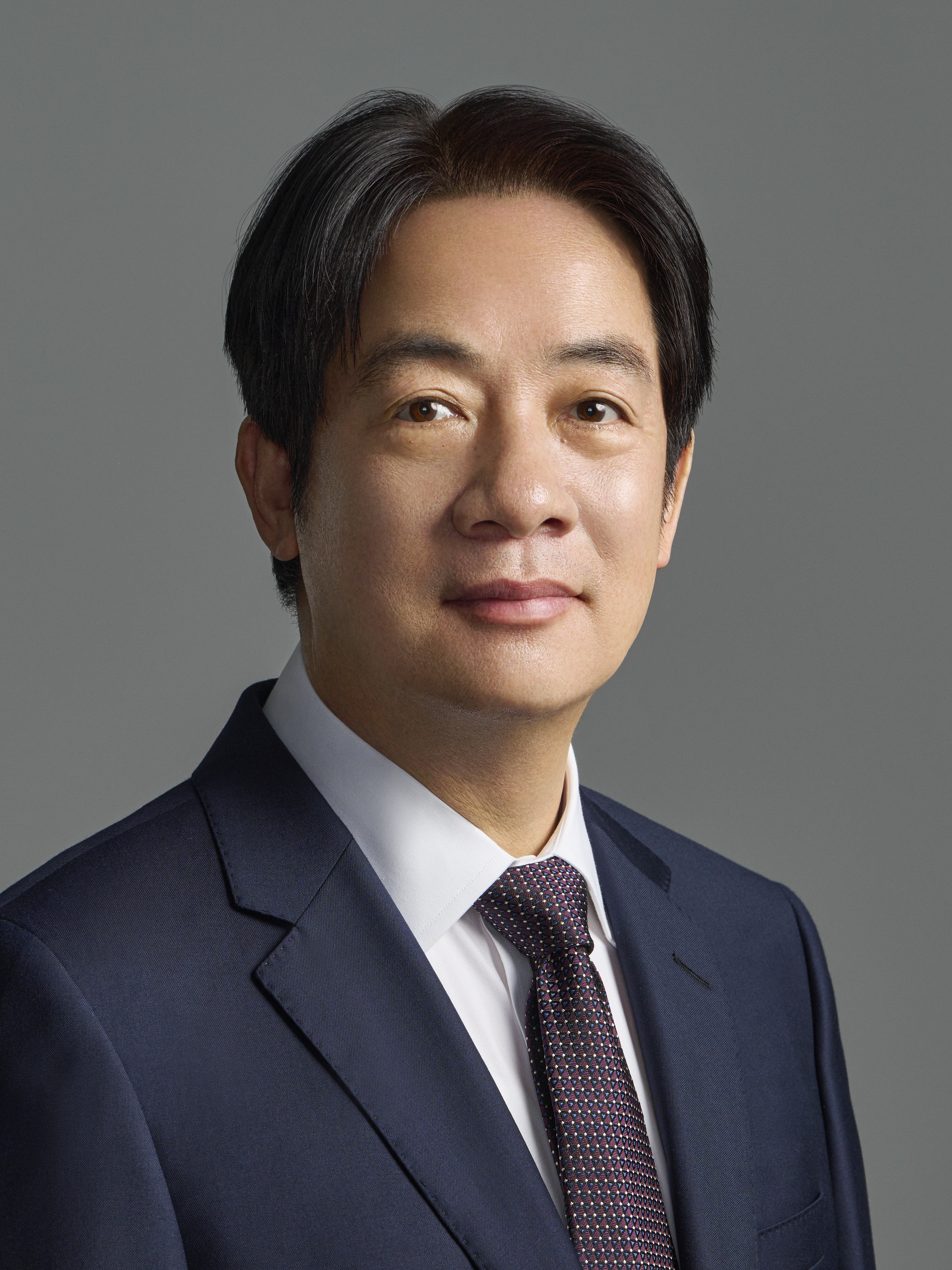
President Lai Ching-te, the main proponent of the 2030 Bilingual Nation policy.

2030 Bilingual Nation (Traditional Chinese: 2030雙語國家; pinyin: 2030 Shuāngyǔ Guójiā; Wade–Giles: 2030 Shuang^{1}-yü^{3} Kuo^{2}-chia^{1}; Pe̍h-ōe-jī: 2030 Siang-gí Kok-ka; Pha̍k-fa-sṳ: 2030 Sûng-ngî Koet-kâ) is a policy in Taiwan promulgated by the Tsai Ing-wen and Lai Ching-te presidential administrations. Its goal is to make English and another language (no official confirmation yet) the primary languages in Taiwanese society by 2030. In 2014, the then-mayor of Tainan city Lai Ching-te launched a ten-year plan entitled "English as the second official language" (英語為第二官方語言) to transform Tainan into a bilingual city by 2024. Lai Ching-te further promoted the national bilingual policy after taking over as premier of the Executive Yuan in 2017, as vice president of Tsai Ing-wen in 2020, and finally as president in 2024. Tsai Ing-wen repeatedly mentioned the goal of being a bilingual country by 2030 in her presidential inaugural address. As of 2021, a budget of more than NT$10 billion (over four years) has been allocated to implement this policy.

== Background ==
English as a majority native language Co-official and majority native language Official but minority native language Secondary language: spoken as a second language by more than 20% of the population, de facto working language of government, language of instruction in education, etc.

The Republic of China (Taiwan) does not have an official language based on its laws. The National Languages Development Act recognizes twenty "national languages" (國家語言), but Standard Chinese (Mandarin) is the de facto lingua franca. Standard Mandarin was mainly brought to Taiwan by the Kuomintang when its seat of government moved to the island. It implemented a Mandarin language policy which banned the use of spoken Taiwanese Hokkien, Hakka, and other languages in schools or in official settings used by most Taiwanese at that time; violations of the prohibition in schools often resulted in physical punishments, fines, or humiliation. Until the present times, Standard Mandarin speakers tend to be politically aligned to the Pan-Blue Coalition, while Taiwanese Hokkien speakers tend to support the Pan-Green Coalition. Some users of Taiwanese Hokkien believe that their language is still being suppressed by a language coming from the outside, Standard Mandarin.

English doesn't have a long history of wide usage in Taiwan but it is the most commonly used language internationally after WWII. Around the globe, 56 countries use English as an official language. Almost all have had a long history of British and American colonization, except Rwanda and Burundi. If Taiwan succeeds with its bilingual policy, it will become the first country in the world to become bilingual from a top-down approach.

According to a survey, 87% of the Taiwanese people support English as the second official language, and 89% support the opening of bilingual English classes in public primary and secondary schools. Moreover, this policy has cross-party support in both political parties. An overwhelming majority of the public supports English as the second official language, regardless if they are pro-blue or pro-green, support reunification or the status quo, or pro-independence.

Some cities in Taiwan have attempted to implement English as a common, official language in the past. In 2014, Lai Ching-te, then Mayor of Tainan, launched a ten-year plan to make English the second official language. In 2019, the then-Mayor of Kaohsiung City Han Kuo-yu also promoted bilingualism in the city. He had all road signs and signages changed to bilingual signs and required that after two years, all civil servants, teachers, police officers, and firefighters must pass an English test for promotion. In the 2020 presidential election, Han Kuo-yu listed bilingual education as one of his political agenda.

== Rationale ==
=== Economy ===
In the policy's development blueprint issued by the Executive Yuan, the two major goals of the policy are to "cultivate the English proficiency of the people" (厚植國人英語力) and "enhance national competitiveness" (提升國家競爭力). One of the visions presented is to "provide people with high-quality jobs and enhance Taiwan's economic development" (提供人民優質工作機會，提升臺灣經濟發展).

An editor of the Liberty Times believes that to strengthen Taiwan's competitiveness in the international market, English proficiency is necessary. This can attract foreign investments and allow international banks to set up financial centers, especially foreign businessmen who are leaving Hong Kong because of the Mainland Chinese government.

According to a survey by Chun Shin Ltd., the organization conducting TOEIC tests in Taiwan, nearly 60% of enterprises have put more focus into English in the past three years than before. If the TOEIC test is used to measure English proficiency, the average score of TOEIC test-takers in Taiwan in 2020 is 564, which is lagging behind Hong Kong (589), Malaysia (634), and South Korea (683). Andrew Wylegala, President of the American Chamber of Commerce in Taiwan, thinks that if Taiwan is to compete with regional financial centers such as Singapore and Hong Kong, a bilingual policy is essential. A study by the English department of National Taiwan Normal University found that the number of words taught in English classes in Taiwan is lower than in mainland China, South Korea, and Japan.

=== National Defense ===
The bilingual policy safeguards Taiwan's sovereignty by promoting exchanges between the Taiwan (ROC) government and its people with other English-speaking countries and thereby deepening its relationship with them at a time they are all experiencing tensions in their relationships with China. At a seminar entitled "Taiwan-US Education Initiative: Establishing a Global Education Partnership Seminar" (台美教育倡議：建立全球教育夥伴關係研討會) which was held at National Chung Cheng University, Joseph Wu said that educational cooperation was the best way to establish cultural and social connections between Taiwan and the US. Sandra Springer Oudkirk, director of the American Institute in Taiwan, said she hoped more Americans would visit Taiwan to learn Chinese, teach English and help Taiwan achieve its goal of bilingual education by 2030.

=== Localization ===
The bilingual policy may dilute the dominance of Standard Chinese (Mandarin) in Taiwan and amplify the cultural differences between Taiwan and Mainland China without offending the Mainland Chinese government.

== Implementation ==
Key Training Universities Chosen by the Ministry of Education (Taiwan)

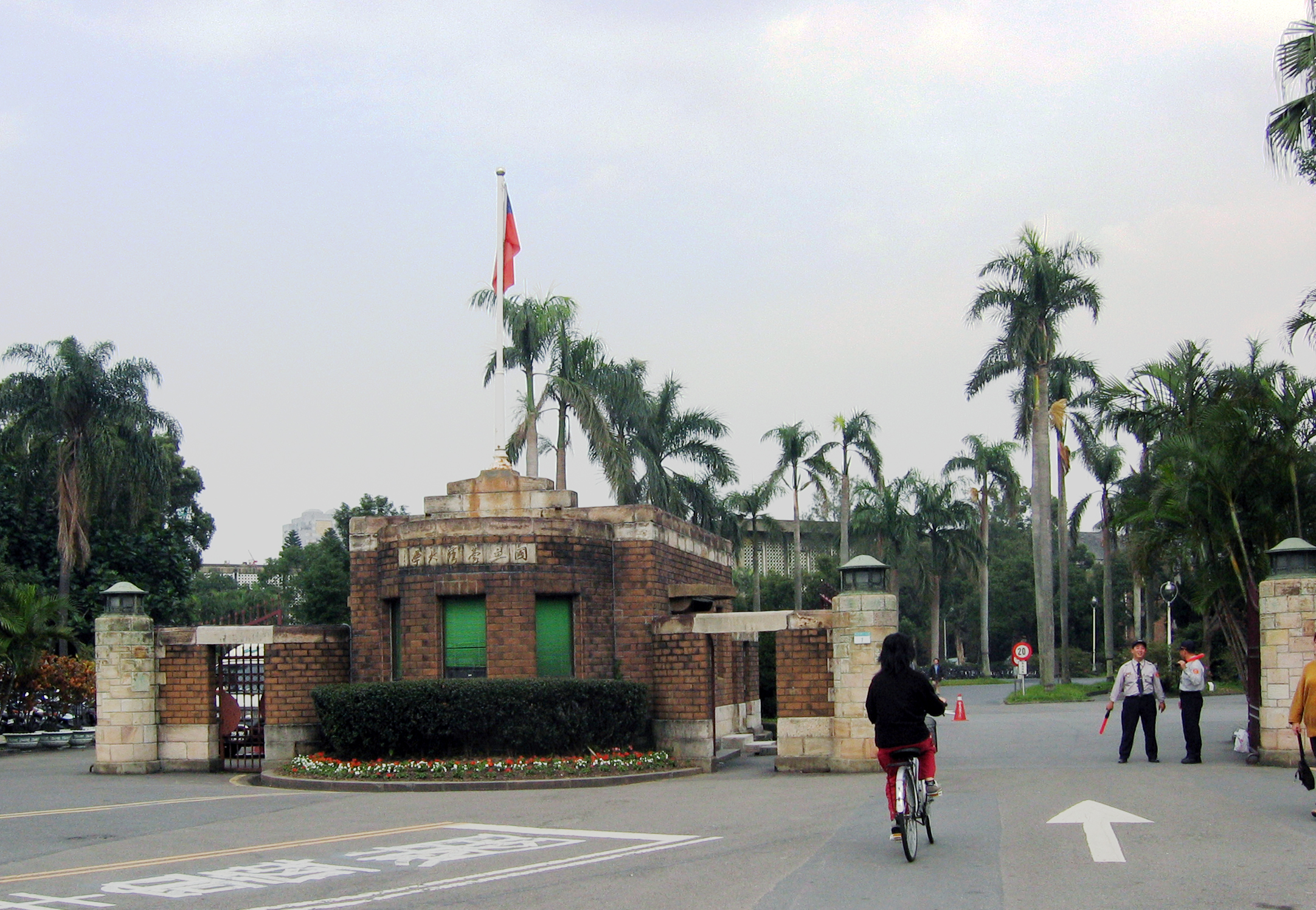
National Taiwan University

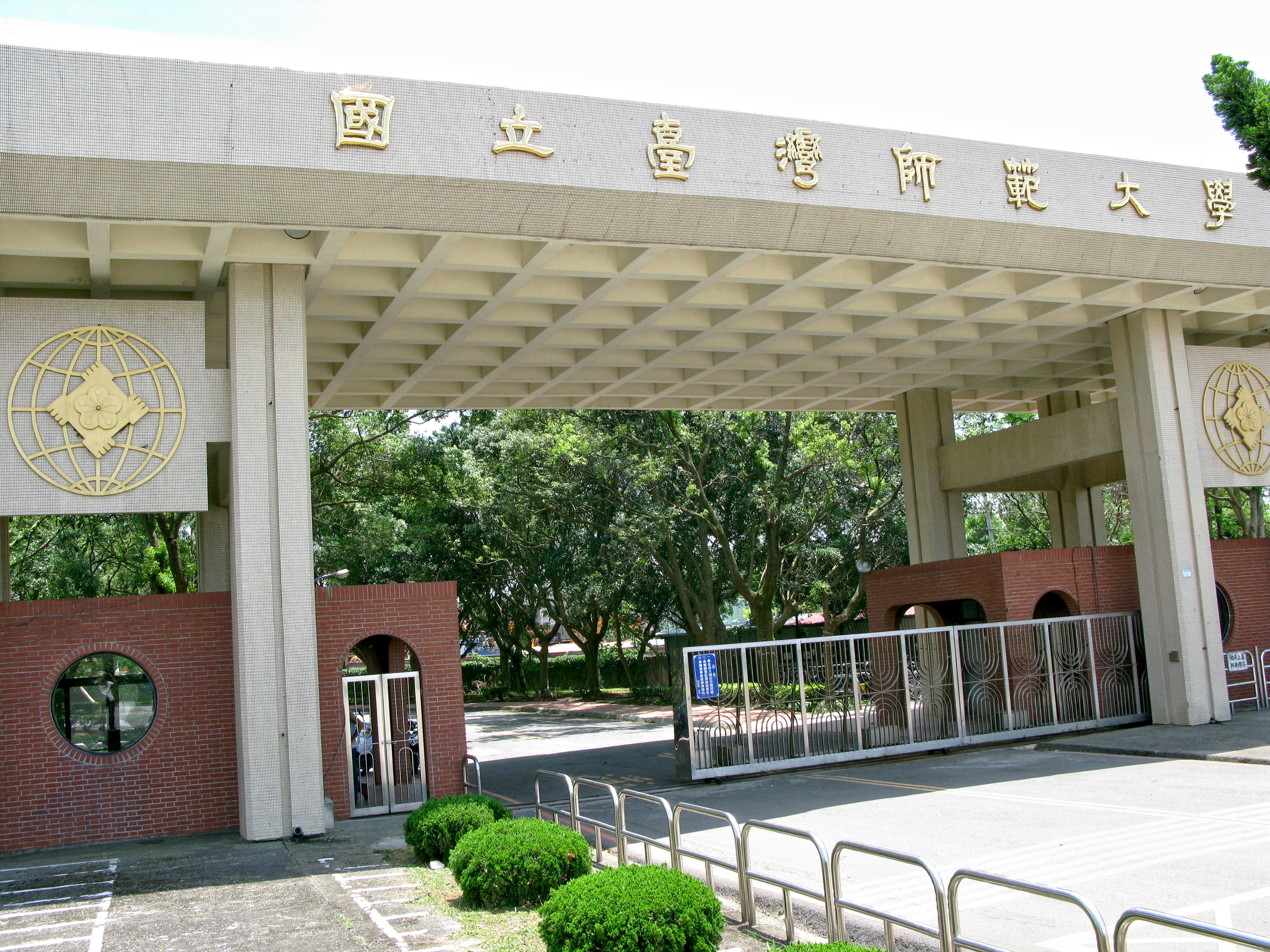
National Taiwan Normal University

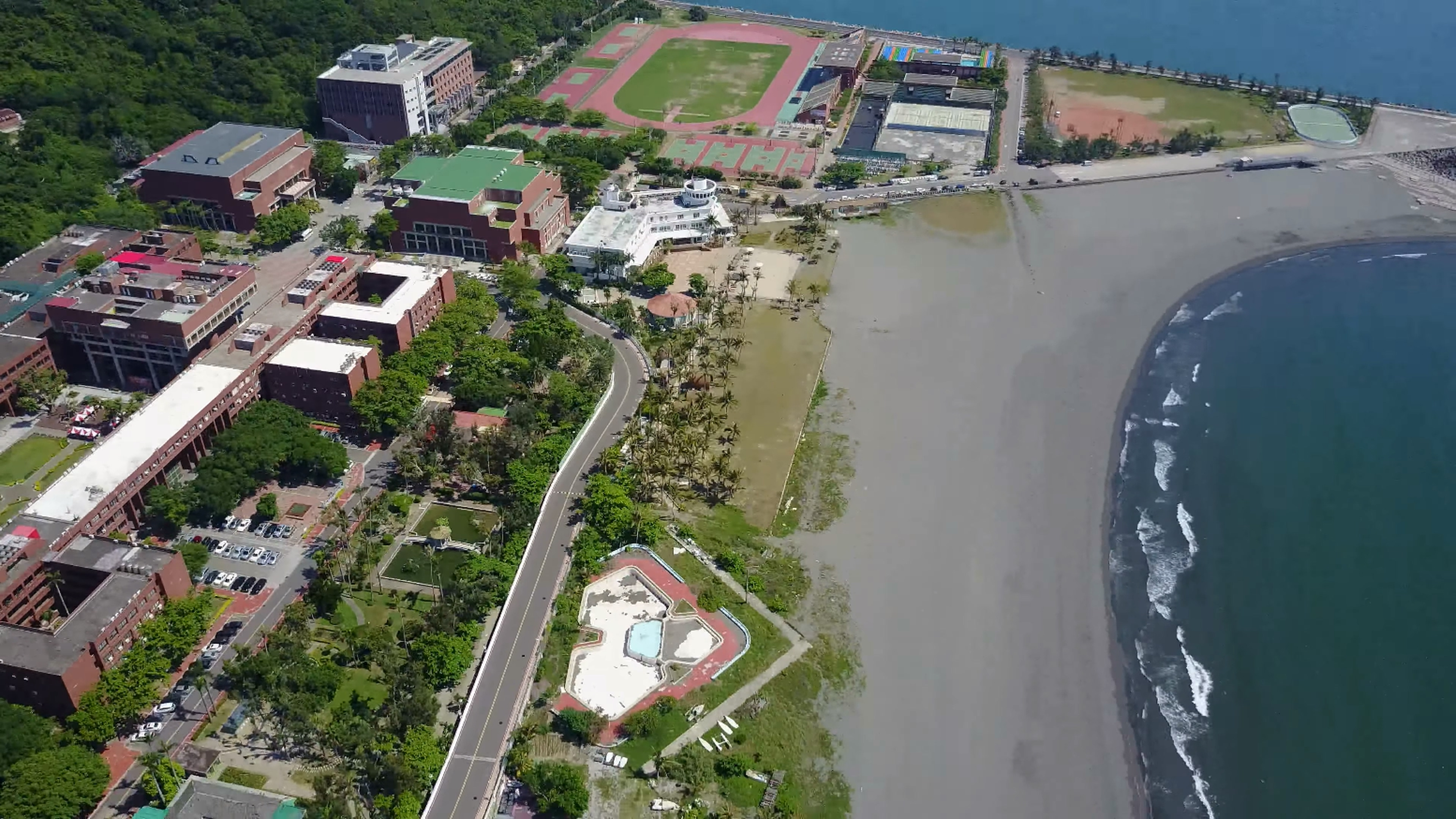
National Sun Yat-sen University

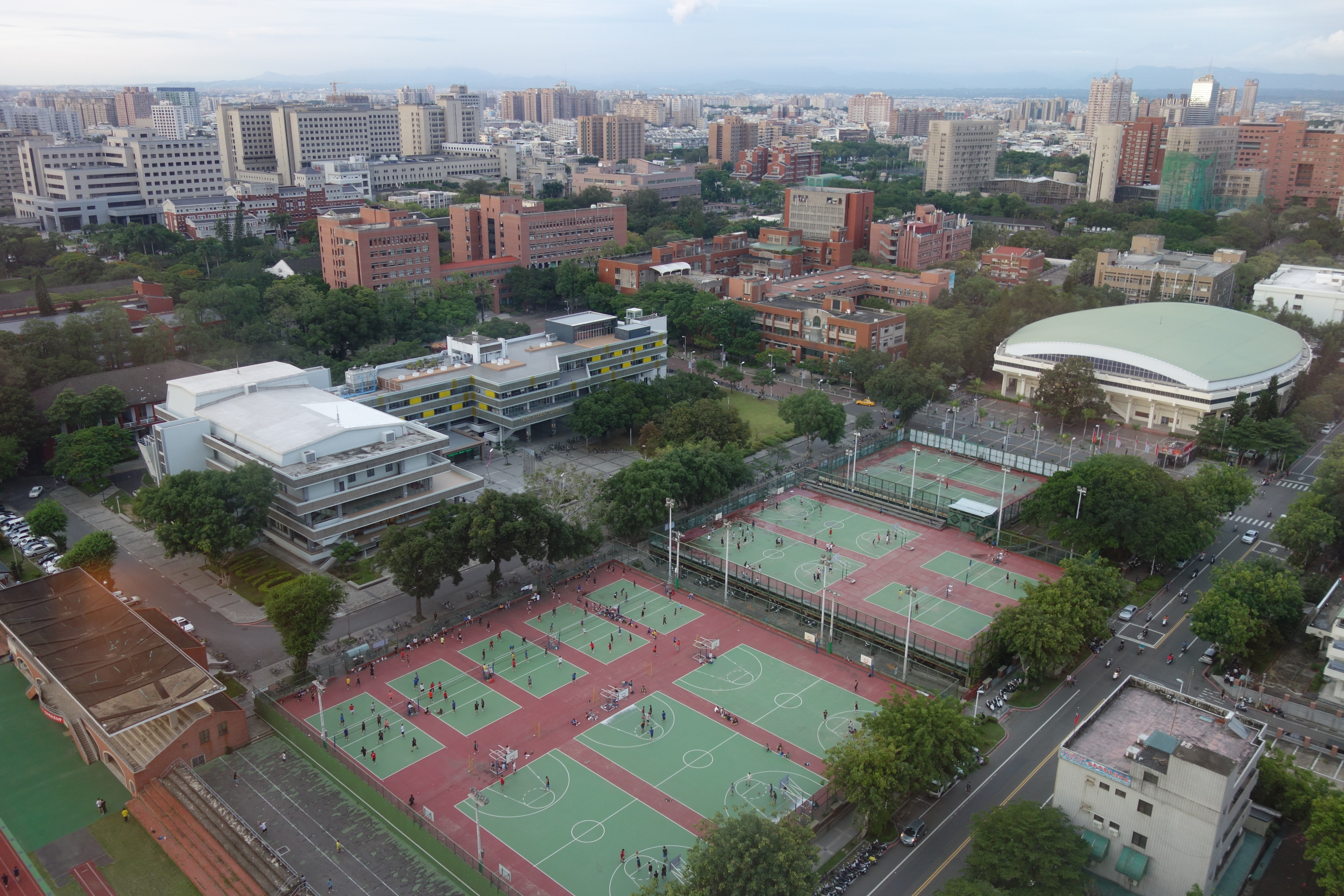
National Cheng Kung University

In October 2017, the Ministry of Education under the guidance of Lai Ching-te established the "Committee on the Promotion of the English language" (英語推動會). In the following year, the committee drafted the "Report on the Promotion of English as an Official Language Policy" (我國推動英語成為官方語言政策報告). The original plan was to make English an official language of Taiwan, but the cost of translating all government documents into English was too high. Because of this, the core of the policy shifted to making all Taiwanese bilingual in English and Chinese. 2019 was declared as "the first year of being a bilingual country" (雙語國家元年). In 2021, the Executive Yuan proposed to establish an administrative body named the "Bilingual National Development Center" (雙語國家發展中心) to implement the policy, which has yet to be approved by the Legislative Yuan.

=== Schools ===
In 2018, the Executive Yuan approved the bilingual policy, where in four years, it will invest more than NT$100 million worth of resources, of which more than 90% will be used for education.

In 2021, a total of NT$930 million will be invested in primary and secondary schools to set up bilingual experimental classes in 50 high schools; For universities, the budget is nearly NT$600 million. The appointed key training universities are National Taiwan University, National Taiwan Normal University, National Sun Yat-sen University, and National Cheng Kung University while 41 key training departments and 37 universal enhancement universities were approved in 25 learning institutions. The Ministry of Education has also adopted the "Employment of Foreign English Teachers at Public Primary and Secondary Schools Assistance Plan" (協助公立國民中小學引進外籍英語教師計畫). Besides the original 81 foreign teachers, an additional 300 foreign teachers will be hired.

The goal of the policy is that by 2024, 60% of primary and secondary schools will only use English in teaching English classes, and 1/7 of schools will be able to teach other subjects bilingually. By 2030, English classes in all high schools in the whole country will be taught solely in English, and one-third of schools will have bilingual instruction in other subjects. In 2024, 25% of sophomores in the funded universities previously mentioned need to reach CEFR B2 in English, and at least 20% of sophomores and freshmen should have 20% of their credits allotted for English-only courses; By 2030, the figures 25%, 20%, and 20% need to reach 50%, 50%, and 50% respectively.

In 2021, the primary and secondary school teachers in the front line believed that this policy lacked support. Even in Taipei, where resources are relatively sufficient, there were still problems such as shortage of teachers and teaching materials.

=== Government agencies ===
In every agency, the deputy heads will form a "Bilingual Promotion Group" (雙語推動小組) that will promote bilingualism. The official websites of various ministries and commissions, documents and regulations related to foreigners, procurement documents, front-line services, and public government information will be written bilingually. English translations of summaries of some indictments and major judicial court judgments will be provided. Cultural and educational venues should promote bilingual services. Civil servants have to cultivate their English communication skills. The National Technician Skills Test must be in English, and the certificate will be issued bilingually.

=== Broadcasting ===
An all-English-language television station will be established and the Taiwan Broadcasting System will be encouraged to broadcast English-language programs. An integrated English learning and English translation resource platform will also be established.

== Criticism ==
=== Examples in other countries ===
Some critics pointed out that even Singapore had spent decades in "establishing a bilingual policy" (建立雙語政策), which compared to Taiwan seems unrealistic to "achieve bilingualism" (達成雙語) within just 12 years. Singapore, which is also Taiwan's inspiration in establishing a successful bilingual society, also had a British colonial history and a practical need for inter-ethnic communication both of which that did not occur in Taiwan. In addition, Taiwan's existing education system is extremely conservative as it focuses on rote memorization. It also does not encourage the use of English in daily life and beliefs of code-switching between Chinese and English as showing off or an implicit status symbol are present in public discourse, such as the attitudes towards the code-switching trend, "Crystal Style" (Chinese: 晶晶體; pinyin: jīngjīngtǐ; Wade–Giles: ching^{1}-ching^{1}-tʻi^{3}). Therefore, critics in 2021 commented that this policy was unlikely to succeed under the current system.

Some students pointed out that for four consecutive years, 70% of students failed their English examinations, but the Taiwanese government still hopes to become a bilingual country within eight years, which they believe is unlikely. Also, since the majority of parents in Taiwan only speak Chinese languages, it is also difficult for children to learn English in a non-English speaking environment.

=== Cost efficiency ===
This policy uses a huge amount of the budget. Opponents believe that these funds should have been used to improve rural education, provide more nutritious school meals, or promote other languages more commonly used in Taiwan. Some people against the policy take Japan as an example, pointing out that although English is not popular, Japan still has great economic influence in the world, and countries with higher GDP per capita than Taiwan, such as Japan, South Korea, Luxembourg, and Iceland, do not use English as an official language, doubting the real benefits of Taiwan's transformation into a bilingual country. Foreign observers who have long lived in Taiwan think that for most Taiwanese, speaking English is not a necessary life skill, and those who need it can learn it on their own. Taiwan Insight, a magazine of the Taiwan Studies Program at the University of Nottingham, also pointed out that strengthening English instruction may further widen the gap between resource-rich students from less-privileged students, and deemed the statement of Chen Mei-ling, minister of the National Development Council, that online resources can solve the problem unreasonable. Danyu Bai (柏單于), Deputy Director of the Trade and Investment Department of the Canadian Trade Office in Taiwan, said that fairness should be considered first in policy-making. From Canada's experience, bilingual education will increase the gap in resource allocation and have a negative effect on social integration.

Chiang Wen-yu (江文瑜), a professor of linguistics at National Taiwan University, and Her One-soon (何萬順), a professor of foreign languages at Tunghai University, believe that the English language skills of the Taiwanese people is already very good. Chiang asserts that Taiwanese people are already the most foreigner-friendly people in the world. Chiang suggests claims that Taiwanese people have poor English language skills is a fabrication, potentially emphasised by those who stand to gain from the demand for English lessons, such as language testing companies.

=== Effect on other languages ===
The body of the policy proposed by the Tsai Ing-wen government only talks about English and does not specify which other language is part of this "bilingualism" (雙語) project. It is generally believed that this language is Standard Chinese (Mandarin), the current mainstream lingua franca in Taiwan. However, Taiwan has many indigenous and local languages, and the National Languages Development Act recognizes 20 national languages, including aboriginal Formosan languages, Taiwanese Hokkien, Hakka, Taiwan Sign Language, Eastern Min (i.e. Matsu dialect), etc. In addition, migrant workers and new migrants also bring with them many languages from neighboring Southeast Asian countries. There is still a debate on the impact of the bilingual policy on other languages. Some people believe that the bilingual policy will kill other languages, leading to the change of Taiwan's linguistic landscape from 20 languages to only recognizing two official languages, negating Taiwan's inherent multiculturalism. However, some people believe that through the introduction of English, the dominance of Standard Chinese (Mandarin) can be removed. The Taiwan Statebuilding Party argues that the bilingual policy should eliminate the foreign Standard Chinese (Mandarin) and choose another native language with English to account for bilingualism.

Some opponents worry that bilingual education will cause confusion among children, but there is no evidence that the bilingual environment itself will cause problems for children. Comprehensive studies have shown that bilingual education is beneficial and harmless to children.

The Linguistic Society of Taiwan and the Taiwan Languages and Literature Society think that making English the second official language is a huge mistake and a form of self-colonization. Other opponents also hold to the idea that it adheres to Anglo-American hegemony, de-sinicization, or a weak version of an independent Taiwan. The editors of the Liberty Times (which has an English version, similar to Japanese newspapers) deem that such criticisms are not worth one's attention.

== See also ==
- English as a lingua franca
- International English
- English-speaking world
- List of countries and territories where English is an official language
- General English Proficiency Test
- Languages of Taiwan
- Taiwanese Mandarin
- Taiwanese Hokkien
- Taiwanese Hakka
- Formosan languages
- Sinicization
- Desinicization
- Taiwanization
- Taiwanese literature movement
