= Theater in Taiwan =

Performing Arts of Taiwan

Theater in Taiwan originated in the Qing dynasty, where Nanguan opera was the main representative until the 18th century, and was subsequently replaced by Beiguan opera. In the early days of the Japanese rule, new school plays and Taiwanese plays were introduced as pioneers of non-traditional forms of opera/New Drama.In addition to North-South drama, there are other forms of drama, such as adult drama, Chao's play, 囝-seater drama, children's play, car drum play, skin ape play, puppet play and other emerging genres of opera.

== Early modern theater in Taiwan ==
=== New Drama Movement under Japanese rule ===
New Drama (xinju) is a general classification for all theatre activities that were not traditional opera (xiqu). In New Drama, stories were set to be in the contemporary society. Actors were in contemporary costume and spoke vernacular language. Stage setting was in the style of modern theatre. The visual style was totally different from that of traditional xiqu. The stage design was historically accurate. The New Drama emerged in a very special social context in the history of theater in Taiwan. The development and decline of New Drama were strongly influenced by its political environments.

The historical trajectory of the trend of Reformed Drama (gai-liang ju) in Taiwan originally came from the Reformed (kairyō) Drama movement in Japan. The overseas students in Japan from Taiwan were heavily influenced by this new trend of drama. During the Reformed Drama movement in Taiwan, some traditional xiqu troupes adapted the traditional plays and set the story background in the modern time. The characters were in contemporary costume and spoke vernacular language. Some traditional opera troupes also attempted this new form of drama, mostly for commercial reasons, in order to find a new way to survive and be accepted by the market, in which traditional drama and new forms of drama were coexisting.

In 1921, the Taiwanese Cultural Association was established by Lin Hsien-tang, Chiang Wei-shui, Tsai Pei-huo, Wang Ming-chuan, and others, with the aim of promoting cultural enlightenment and awakening the national consciousness of the Taiwanese people. The association viewed traditional xiqu performances and folk rituals, including religious ceremonies, as tools used by the Japanese government to control and oppress the Taiwanese people. This perspective sparked the New Drama movement, as the association joined forces with young individuals who shared the same ideals, hoping to use theatrical performances to transform the societal culture and mindset of the era and elevate the cultural standards of the general population. During this period, the new plays were referred to as "Cultural Drama (Wen-hua Ju)." However, the profound symbolism in Cultural Drama made it difficult for less educated citizens to resonate with, resulting in its main audience consisting of intellectuals, thus limiting its influence on popular education. With the division of the association, Cultural Drama gradually declined.

In 1924, while studying in Japan, Chang Wei-hsien encountered the Japanese little theater. Upon his return to Taiwan, he founded the Starlight (Xin Guang) Drama Club, introducing the latest stage concepts and techniques and driving the professional development of New Drama in Taiwan. Subsequently, Chang once again went to Japan to study actor training systems and the latest stage art techniques at the Tsukiji Little Theater. He also conducted in-depth research on the operation of professional theater groups.

Two years later, he returned to Taiwan and founded Min Feng Drama Club. During this time, in addition to teaching in the club, Chang also collaborated with intellectuals, such as Yang San-lang, Lien Ya-tang, Huang Tien-hai, and Yoshimune Katsuma, to offer a series of professional courses in stage arts, modern theatre, music, dance, and fine arts to the public. These endeavors brought innovative changes to Taiwanese New Drama, and Chang came to be recognized as "the Number One Person of New Drama in Taiwan."

Promoters of the New Drama movement aimed at replacing old style traditional xiqu with new formats of theater. They wanted to improve the cultural literacy of people and to promote progressive social ideas. The New Drama movement can be classified into two major categories: "pursuing artistic development" and "spreading propaganda for social reform."

The first category, "pursuing artistic development," was led by artists and groups such as Chang Wei-hsien with his Starlight Drama Club, Min Feng Drama Club, and Ding-Shin Club, as well as the Kosei Theatre Society founded by Lin Tuan-chiu, Chang Wen-huan, Wang Jing-chuan, and other people. The second category, "spreading propaganda for social reform," was led by Taiwan Cultural Association and other similar political-oriented troupes.

=== Japanization (Kominka) movement period (1937–1945) ===
After Chang Wei-hsien, the New Drama movement went quiet for a while, and it was not until Lin Tuan-chiu that the movement gained its new momentum. Lin also studied abroad in Japan, during which he actively participated in local theater troupes and worked in Toho Cinemas. These experiences allowed him to establish friendships with other Taiwanese artists who had also studied in Japan, including musicians Lu Chuan-sheng, Lu He-ruo, and others. After returning to Taiwan, Lin Tuan-chiu was invited to direct the film version of Ali Mountain, a play written by Chien Kuo-hsien. Lin Tuan-chiu soon became famous in the circle of New Drama movement in Taiwan. He was also invited to work in the Taiwan Drama Association, which was founded by the Japanese government for controlling the freedom of artistic creation in Taiwan. The association was in charge of the censorship of the plays and had the right to add changes and put limitations on the format of performances. Lin Tuan-chiu soon left the association and joined the New Drama movement that was closely monitored by the government.

On April 29, 1943, Lin Tuan-chiu founded the Kosei Theatre Society with the novelist Chang Wen-huan, the musician Lu Chuan-sheng, Lu He-ruo, and other intellectuals and youths from all over Taiwan. The aim of the society was to create Taiwanese dramas for Taiwanese audience. The Kosei Theatre Society was the last important New Drama troupe during the Japanese ruling period. Plays like Castrated Chicken reflected that even under the high pressure of colonial control, Taiwanese people were still longing for freedom. In the end, most of the youths and intellectuals in the Kosei Theatre Society were oppressed under the high pressure ruling by the government. Some people were sent to jail or even died. Others chose to leave the cultural circle.

The New Drama movement in Taiwan started in about the same time as the rising of the Taiwanese Opera (kua-a-hi). The Taiwanese Opera soon became the most popular form of folk entertainment after a short period of time. However, the New Drama still remained in the condition of sporadic amateur performances and could not become a substantial genre. The New Drama movement had a grand vision, but its development was limited due to social development and political conditions. The Japanese colonial government and later the Nationalist government both paid close attention to New Drama and attempted to suppress it. The productions of New Drama remained amateur without attaining higher artistic achievements. In addition, New Drama also lacked the entertainment value and could not engage with the audience. It did not become the mainstream of entertainment.

== Early postwar period and after the Nationalist Government arrival in Taiwan ==
From 1945 to 1949, the Nationalist government officially took over Taiwan from the Empire of Japan and established the Taiwan Provincial Chief Administrative Executive Office. From the defeat of the Japanese empire to the total retreat of ROC government to Taiwan, there was a brief transitional period. During this time, the long-suppressed creative energy of New Drama started to flourish, primarily through the endeavors of the Seng Feng Drama Club, comprising Sung Fei-wo, Chien Kuo-hsien, Chang Wen-huan, and Wang Jing-chuan. Their performances drew an increasing number of individuals interested in theater. The Nationalist officials in charge of Taiwan at that time adopted a tolerance policy towards these performances and provided a brief friendly environment for New Drama to develop.

In 1947, the February 28 incident broke out, and was followed by the White Terror. Many intellectuals were killed or arrested during massive suppression, including several major Taiwanese theater artists. Theater activities with a critical voice to the society, such as New Drama, were silenced since then. The Taiwan Provincial Administrative Executive Office strengthened its control over theater activities and speech freedom in Taiwan by formulating the Regulations on the Management of Theatrical Troupes in the Taiwan Province, which requested that all theater performances and activities must be registered and reviewed in advance.

In 1949, the ROC government retreated to Taiwan completely and martial law was imposed in Taiwan. People in Taiwan were under another highly tightened political control after the Japanese ruling. All aspects of freedom, including thoughts, movements, languages, and personal freedom, were under control. The rule of the martial law lasted for 38 years and was finally lifted in 1987.

Theater activities during the martial law period became tools of political propaganda for the government to reinforce its political power, to strengthen its social control, to fight against the invasion of Chinese Communists and all the oppositional forces, and to control people's thoughts. In this period, the government promoted the slogan of "Combat Literature and Arts" and was enthusiastically supported by the literary and arts circles. In 1950, the Chinese Literature and Arts Awards Committee was founded and offered a huge amount of monetary award for literary works that promoted national consciousness and anti-Communist ideology. Later, the founding of Chinese Writers' and Artists' Association absorbed many theater artists as members. Together with the existing theater troupes in the troops, schools, and government units, these organizations helped raise the anti-Communist drama and literature to the highest position.

The anti-Communist drama was created to support the government for its political goals. In the political reality of that time, playwrights had no choice but to join the anti-Communist movement. Many anti-Communist plays were written in a short period of time. Since the topics were limited and the messages of ideology were straightforward, the plots of these plays were very similar and repetitive. It did not have much entertainment value. The audience gradually lost interest in these plays. In addition, high entertainment tax imposed on ticket sales and rental fees of the playhouses also became a heavy financial burden for theater troupes. Without audience support and steady income, most New Drama troupes with their repetitive plays fell into a gradual decline and disbanded.

== Little Theater Movement in Taiwan ==
=== First stage of the Little Theater Movement (1960–1984) ===
Under the martial law, there was very little future for the development of the New Drama movement in Taiwan. The number of people watching live theater was getting smaller and smaller, and theatre was gradually replaced by the movies. In 1960, Li Man-kuei founded the Trinity Drama Club after the model of the Little Theater Movements in foreign countries. The club enlisted many members and presented periodic public theater performances in order to serve as the starting point for the reformation movements of theater. She also founded the Little Theater Movement Promotion Committee and organized the Stage play Appreciation Committee. For more than 20 years, Li Man-kuei dedicated herself in promoting theater activities. She organized World Drama Festival and Youth Drama Festival that provided students with more opportunities to participate in drama performance. She was also the play script reviewer of the Chinese Literature and Arts Award Committee. She dedicated herself in promoting theater activities for children, college students, women, and religion groups, with the aim that theater can evoke patriotism and build national identity for the youths and the mass. She revitalized the moribund spirit of theater and encouraged people to write more new plays. She brought the stage play movement in Taiwan to the next level.

In the 1960s, when Taiwanese society became more stabilized, studying abroad started to become a trend. The launch of the Modern Literature magazine offered the initiation of modernism to people in Taiwan. Works of many important European and American playwrights were translated and introduced to Taiwan readers through this magazine. In 1965, a group of young people who were enthused about theater and the movies started a magazine titled Theater. The Theater magazine introduced many artistic movies and theater works in the west. Readers can understand the current states of theater in the West with its development and learn more about the theories of modern western theater, various forms of theaters and topics of plays. The Theater magazine opened up a new horizon for theater in Taiwan.

Important playwrights in this period included Yao Yi-wei, Chang Show-foong, and Huang Mei-shu. Yao Yi-wei was very productive and the themes of his plays were diverse. Chang Show-foong wrote plays in the epic theatre style and collaborated with the Christian Art Fellowship to present her works. Huang Mei-shu translated a series of plays by the Irish playwright W. B. Yeats. He also wrote many short plays based on folk stories and explored new styles of modern stage play. Through these playwrights, it is possible to get a glimpse of theater in Taiwan at the beginning of culture exchange with western arts and literature.

In 1980, Yao Yi-wei organized the first Experimental Theater Festival. Five works were presented that year: Bao Fu (Burden/Baggage) by Lanling Theatre, Hezhu’s New Match by Chin Shih-chieh, Let’s Try Walking Together by Yao Yi-wei, Ordinary People by Huang Chien-yeh, and The Dumb Son-in-law by Huang Mei-shu. Plays presented in the festival displayed various non-traditional theater styles that were distinctively different from traditional stage play. The Experimental Theater Festival started a dialogue between traditional drama and modern drama and let more people see the various possibilities of the development of theater. It influenced the subsequent development of modern drama. The festival was therefore seen as an important milestone in the development of modern drama in Taiwan.

From 1980 to 1984, there were five annual Experimental Theater Festivals. Under a very limited budget, a total of 36 plays were presented in the festivals. Besides Lanling Theatre, people who participated in the festivals were mostly teachers, students, and alumni of the theatre departments in colleges. The topics of the plays included translations of works by foreign playwrights, adaptations of contemporary novels, adaptations of traditional operas, and "original works" written or developed by the troupe members. The contents reflected many problems of the modern life, including romantic relationship, workplace problems, and marriage. There was no criticism of reality or discussions about sensitive political issues.

This trend of little theater activities and experimental spirits deeply influenced the subsequent development of Taiwanese theater. Representative troupes and artists of this time include Lanling Theatre, Chin Shih-chieh, Wu Ching-chi, Hugh Lee, Cho Ming, Liu Ruo-yu, and Ma Ting-ni.

=== Second stage of the Little Theater Movement (1985–1990) ===
Compared with the little theater movement in the first stage, the second stage had a totally different creative energy. The styles were against the traditional stage play. There were full of avant-garde and experimental spirits. The limitation of the proscenium stage convention was also broken. In addition, in the late 1980s in Taiwan, the martial law was lifted, and the society in Taiwan became more and more open. Many theater troupes attempted to combine the current social issues in their works. Some productions were openly ideological. Some troupes were affiliated with various social movements such as student movements, peasant movements, labor movements, and women's movements. The theater of that time was full of critical spirits, and almost everything was possible on stage.

In this stage, some theater troupes were too experimental in forms or not yet mature in terms of acting and directing. Therefore, they couldn't successfully communicate their contents and ideas with the audience. Some troupes were too political and too radical so that their audience was shrinking. Representative troupes of this time were U-Theatre, Critical Point Theater Phenomenon, and Rive-Gauche Theatre Group.

=== Third stage of the Little Theater Movement and the appearance of commercial theater troupes (1990–2000) ===
In this period, theater experiments from the previous period were continuing. In addition, some theater troupes also started to choose a more popular direction for their development. The plays and the acting styles were more attractive to the audience. These troupes gradually became the mainstream theater troupes in Taiwan. They were the so-called "big theater" or commercial theater troupes. The little theater activities of this stage were not as passionate as those in the previous stage. Theater troupes turned their focus on the exploration of artistic forms and attempted to develop their own distinctive styles and characteristics. In addition to exploring new contents for the play, new performance systems were also introduced in order for theater troupes to develop an aesthetical style of performance distinctly different from other troupes. Representative troupes of this time were Taiwan Walker Theater, Stalker Theater Group, Golden Bough Theatre, Tainaner Ensemble, and Assignment Theatre. In contrast with the little theater troupes, the main stream theater troupes or "big theater" in Taiwan also started from experimental theater activities. But the plays presented by these troupes were more popular and easier to understand. The topics were closer to the living experiences of the audience. Therefore, the audience members tended to engage with the performance. These troupes were gradually building up their audience base and became large-scale mainstream theatre troupes. Since their business scales were large enough to become profitable, they were also called "commercial theaters." Representative mainstream theater troupes of this time were Performance Workshop, Godot Theater Company, Hugh Lee's Ping-Fong Acting Troupe, and Greenray Theatre Company.
