= Amir Sagi =

Israeli professor of life sciences

- אמיר שגיא
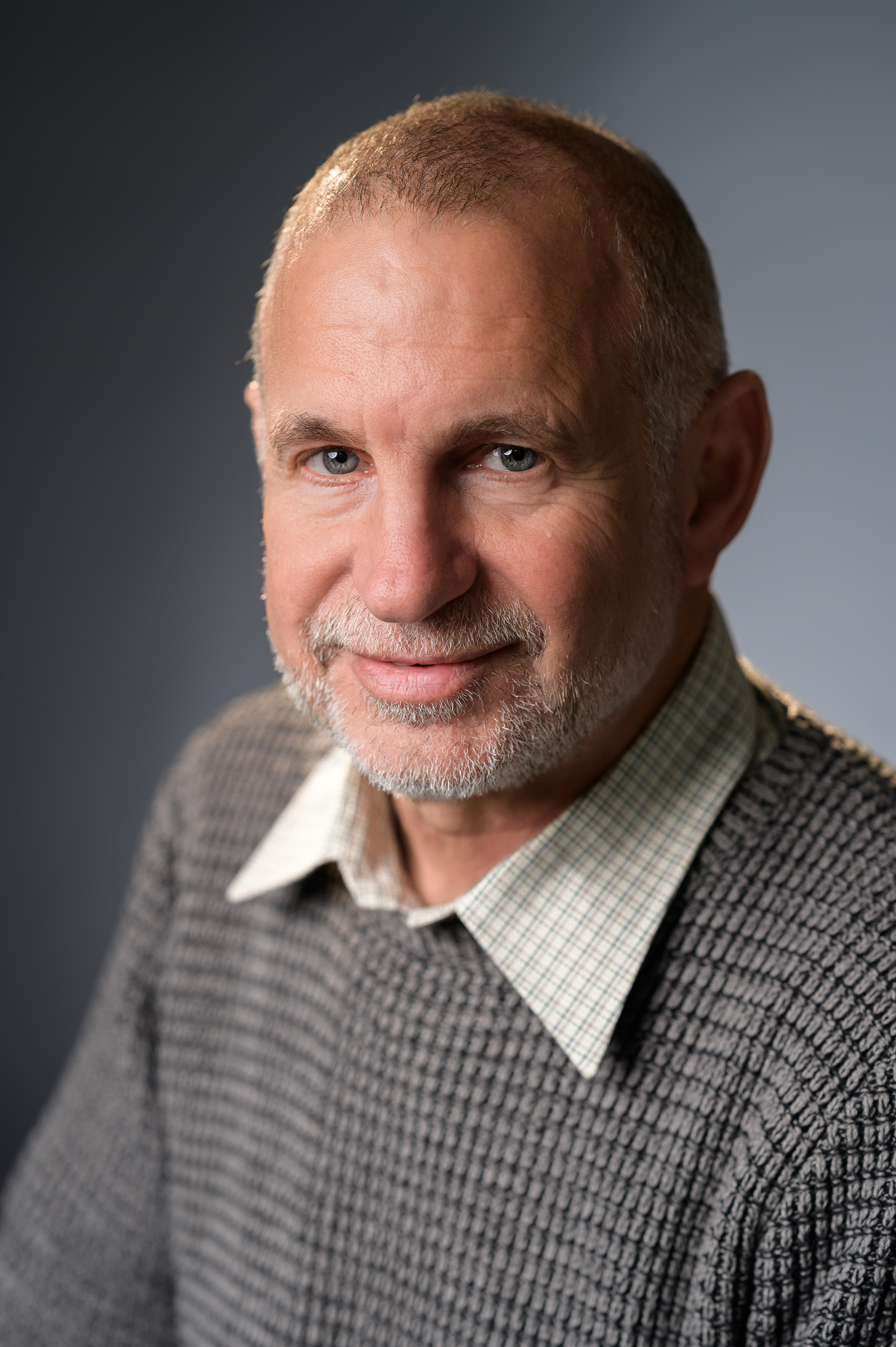
- Sagi in 2023
- Born: May 22, 1956 (age 70); Jerusalem
- Citizenship: Israeli
- Known for: Crustacean biology, sexual differentiation, and cell growth
- Scientific career
- Fields: Biology, life sciences

Amir Sagi (Hebrew: אמיר שגיא; born May 22, 1956) is a professor of life sciences at Ben Gurion University of the Negev, whose field of expertise is crustacean biology, physiology, endocrinology, and functional genomics. He contributed to the study of sexual differentiation, cell growth and aquaculture.

== Early life and education ==
Sagi completed his MSc, in oceanography and marine biology at The Hebrew University of Jerusalem which marked the start of his interest in crustacean reproduction strategies. and during his PhD he addressed anatomical and physiological aspects of differentiation in prawns, with special attention to the androgenic gland.

== Research and career ==
His postdoctoral training in comparative endocrinology was at the University of Connecticut and the Marine Biological Laboratory at Woods Hole, Massachusetts. under Prof Hans Laufer. Sagi than moved to Ben Gurion University of the Negev (1992) in which he was promoted to the degree of full professor of life sciences (2005), and distinguished professor (since 2018).

He was also president of the International Society for Invertebrate Reproduction and Development (ISIRD) between 2011 and 2013, and held various roles within academic and professional committees such as Dean of the Faculty of Natural Sciences at Ben Gurion University of the Negev (2008–2011) and as a board member of the National Institute for Biotechnology in the Negev.

Sagi's group has discovered the IAG physiological sexual switch, and its associated gene expression in decapods investigating multigenic functions in crustacean reproduction and growth and the establishment of genome editing in prawns using application of CRISPR.

His group established monosex biotechnologies in crustacean culture including the application of temporal RNA interference (RNAi) in the field of aquaculture for all-male culture. Crustacean monosex technologies are applied in Vietnam, Thailand, China, Malaysia, Israel. He is a co-founder of the all-female culture biotech company Enzootic Ltd.

Prawns are efficient predators thus might serve as sustainable and responsible biocontrol agents over various invasive and pest species. The Sagi lab development of monosex prawn biotechnologies enables the application of responsible, efficient, and non-invasive biocontrol agents in various parts of the world.

Prof. Amir Sagi has received the Lifetime Achievement Award at the ACEEU Asia-Pacific Triple E Awards in Malaysia 2024, recognizing his contributions to aquaculture biotechnology over the past two decades.

== Awards and honors ==
- Vice President and Dean of R&D Award for Breakthrough Research (2022)
- ICA award for leading entrepreneurship in agriculture and biotechnology (2018)
- The Crustacean Society Excellence in Research Award (2015–16)
- The Landau Prize for Sciences and Arts (2014)
- The Global Aquaculture Alliance's inaugural Novus Global Aquaculture Innovation Award (2013)
- Lily and Sidney Oelbaum Chair in Applied Biochemistry
- Lifetime Achievement Award at the ACEEU Asia-Pacific Triple E Awards, 2024.
- Recognition from the Bard Foundation for his contribution to aquaculture and global food security, 2024
