= Indoor fishing =

Indoor variation of fishing

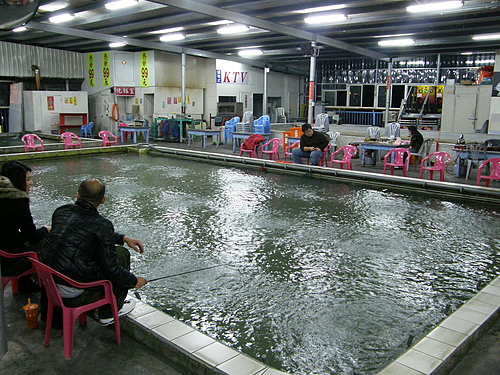
A shrimp fishing pond in Taipei, Taiwan.

Indoor fishing is a recreational activity in which patrons fish or shrimp from man-made pools. Patrons typically pay per hour to use the pool; indoor fishing facilities provide equipment, such as fishing rods, and patrons keep whatever they catch. Pools are often separated by stock type, such as shrimp size, or species. The most common shrimp is the Malaysian freshwater prawn, with separate pools for fish species such as tilapia, carp, and catfish for a challenge.

Indoor fishing is a popular activity in parts of East Asia.

Some indoor fishing facilities give out prizes for catching certain fish.

Indoor fishing is enjoyed by many demographics. Some pools cater to older patrons as a post-work relaxation activity. Indoor fishing pools may also cater to children to educate and foster an interest of fish and fishing.

== Variations ==
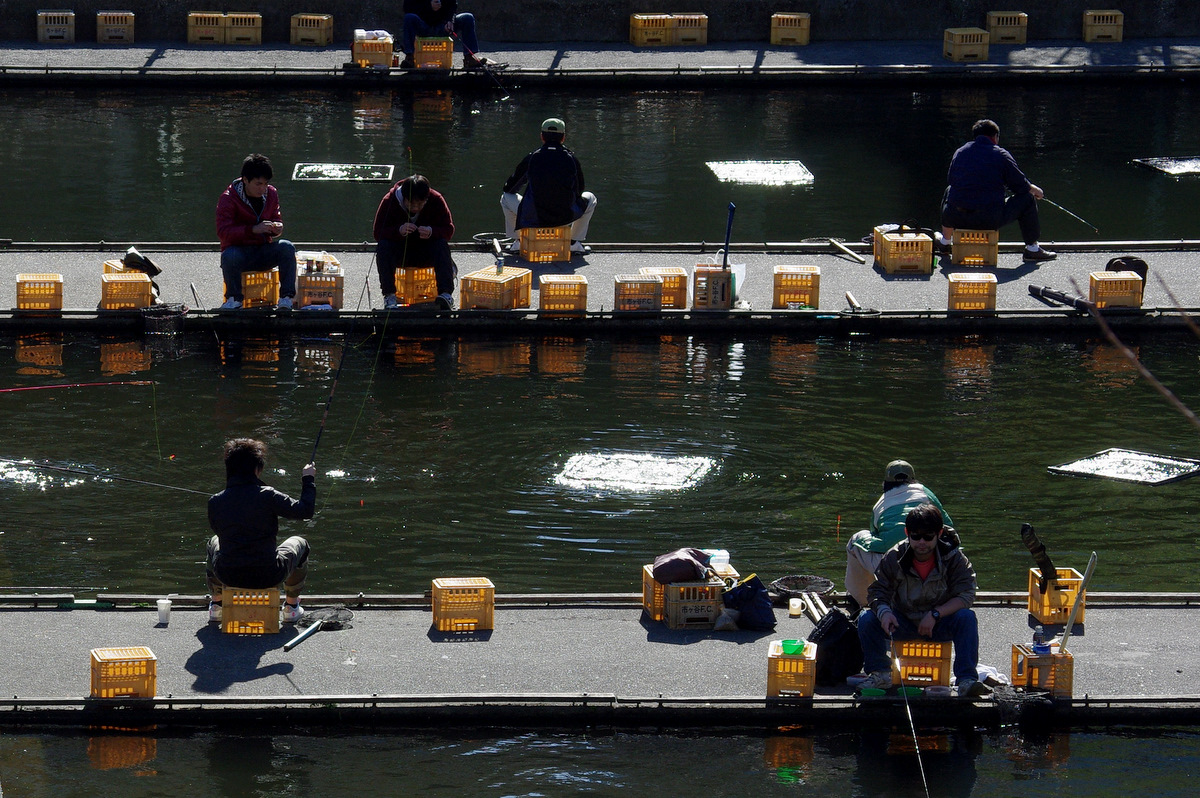
Tsuribori pond in Ichigaya, Japan.

=== Tsuribori ===
There are some outdoor tsuribori (釣り堀) facilities in Japan.

=== Shrimping ===
Indoor shrimping (釣蝦) began in Taiwan soon after outdoor shrimping became popular in its southern regions in the early 1990s. Farmers opened the pools used to raise giant river prawns to the public for fishing; likely to compensate for the species's poor reaction to refrigeration and freezing. This use of giant river prawns allowed farmers to capitalize on the greater ease of raising them compared to the more popular giant tiger prawn. Indoor shrimping has since spread to Hong Kong and Singapore. A Taiwanese-style shrimping venue opened in Houston in 2023.

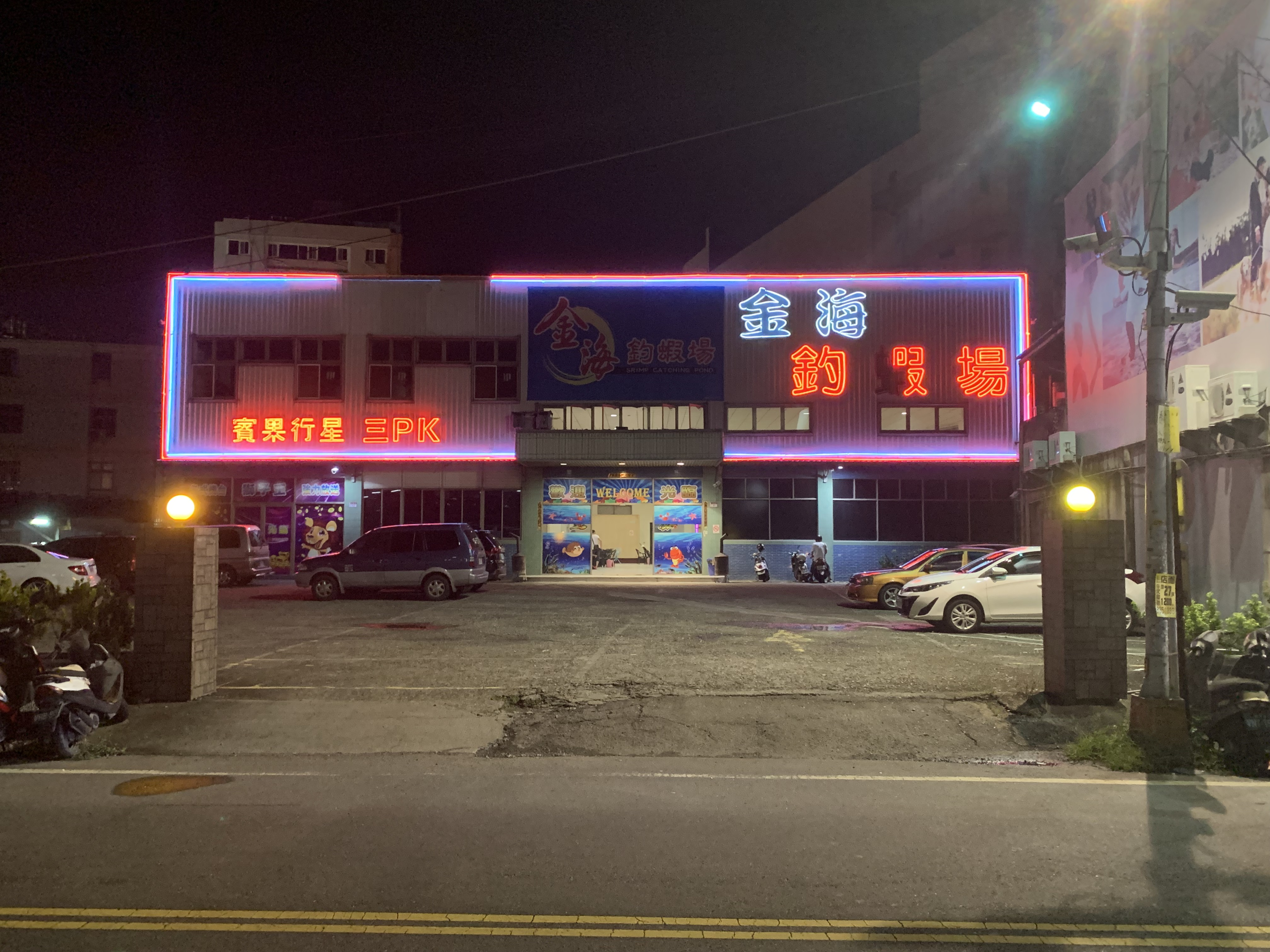
A shrimp fishing pond in Taiwan.

Indoor shrimping remains popular as a family-friendly activity that can be done alone, as a family, or in a group of friends or coworkers. Shrimp can also be caught more quickly and easily than fish, allowing it to fit into an urban lifestyle.

Competitive shrimping contests are held in Taiwan, Hong Kong, and Singapore.

=== Enclosed docks ===
In the United States, there have been cases where structures are built around natural bodies of water, thereby allowing visitors to fish indoors.

=== Temporary indoor pools ===
In the United States and Canada, indoor fishing pools are sometimes temporarily erected for special events. These indoor pools are put up at sport fishing events to entertain children and expose them to catch and release fishing. In some cases, swimming pools are drained and filled with fish for community indoor fishing events for families and children.

== In popular culture ==
In an episode of the Netflix reality show Terrace House, some participants visit a Japanese novelty restaurant named Zauo, where customers can catch fish for their dinner inside the restaurant.

Images of costumed versions of the Mr. Osomatsu characters being photographed at a tsuribori facility in Shinjuku for a magazine article went viral in Japan, the same pond they visited in the show.
