= U-Theatre =

Performing arts in Taiwan

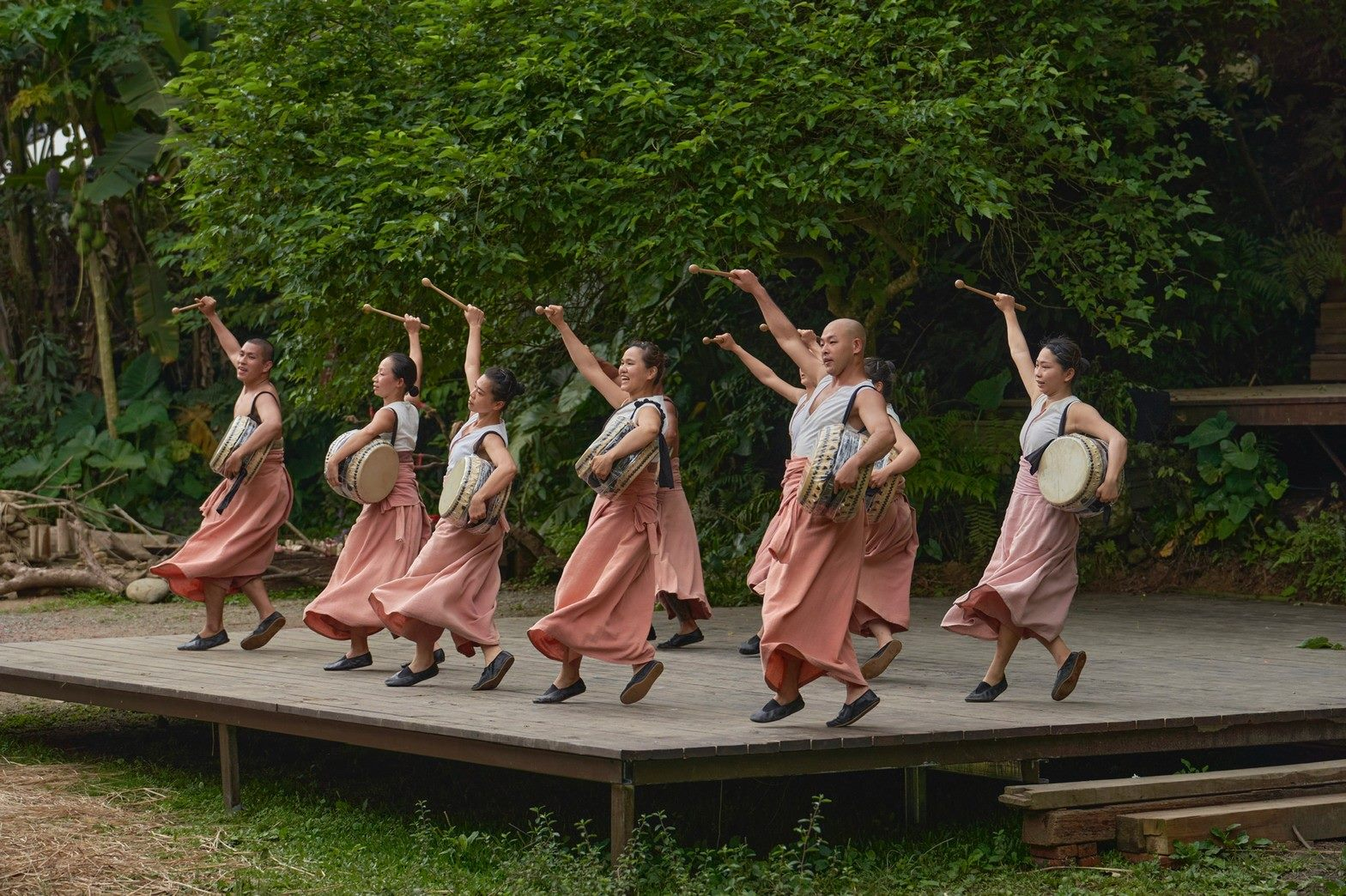
A U-Theatre performance in 2022

U Theatre (Chinese: 優人神鼓; pinyin: yourén shéngǔ) is a performing arts group based in Taiwan, founded in 1988 by Liu Ruo-Yu on Mount Laochuan in the Muzha District of Taipei.

In 1993, Huang Chih-Chun joined the group as the percussion director. The group's training core combines elements such as meditation, martial arts, and drumming, incorporating physical training inspired by theatre director Jerzy Grotowski, traditional martial arts, drumming, Tai Chi, Chinese opera, religious rituals, and Jing Zuo (sitting meditation).

== History ==
U Theatre is a Taiwan-based performing arts group founded in 1988 by Liu Ruo-Yu on Mount Laochuan in the Muzha District of Taipei. Huang Chih-Chun joined the group as the percussion director in 1993. The group emphasizes “meditation as a foundation before drumming” and integrates multiple elements into their performances. These include the drawing on theatre director Jerzy Grotowski’s inspiration, traditional martial arts, drumming, Tai Chi, Chinese opera, religious rituals, and Jing Zuo (sitting meditation).

The group has been practicing “Yun-Jiao” since 1996. Founder Liu Ruo-Yu coined this term to describe a training method that combines walking and mindfulness to calm the performers’ minds. The concept is to “walk a day’s journey, drum a performance.” By 2016, they had walked over 13,000 kilometers.

In 1998, the production “Sound Of The Ocean” was invited to perform at the Avignon Arts Festival and received the award for “Best Show” from the renowned French newspaper Le Monde. The acclaim continued in 2000 when it was recognized as the “Most Popular Show” at the Lyon Dance Arts Festival in France.

In 2002, the production “Bodhisattva” won the “First Prize in Performing Arts” at the inaugural Taishin Arts Awards in Taiwan. In 2014, the group received the “Republic of China (Taiwan) Presidential Innovation Award” in the group category.

In 2003, they embarked on promoting performing arts education by offering drumming and martial arts training courses for elementary and junior high school students. In January 2006, they assumed management of Taipei City Government’s Yong An Art Center - Performing Arts School 36, with the goal of fostering community arts and culture. In 2007, they collaborated with Taipei Jingwen High School to establish the “U-theater Performing Arts Class,” which incorporated performing arts into the high school curriculum.

On August 13, 2019, a fire consumed their theater situated on Mount Laochuan. The fire destroyed the main building and over 200 musical instruments, amounting to an estimated loss of millions of dollars. On December 3 of the same year, U Theatre convened a press conference to announce the launch of a two-year reconstruction project. The plan included temporary rehearsal spaces in the first year and a complete reconstruction of the mountain theater in the second year. They invited the public to actively engage and collaborate with the theater troupe in rebuilding the natural ecological theater.

In 2020, during their theater reconstruction, they faced the challenge of the COVID-19 pandemic. They staged the production “Conversation with Heaven” to mark the anniversary of the disaster. One year later, they toured the country, reviving the play “River Journey”.
