= Taipei Community Services Center =

Logo of the Community Services Center

The Community Services Center (Chinese: 財團法人台北市國際社區服務文教基金會; pinyin: Cáituán Fǎrén Táiběishì Guójì Shèqū Fúwù Wénjiào Jījīn huì), also called the Community Services Center Taipei or the Center, is a Taipei-based non-profit organization.

== History ==
The Center was founded in 1985, originally as a subsidiary of the Taiwan Adventist Hospital. It was formally registered as a nonprofit foundation with the Taipei City Government Department of Education in 1993, to "design and provide educational, inspiring and culturally enriching materials, activities and courses for overseas companies, institutions, and individuals" in Taiwan.

Located in Shilin District near Tianmu and the neighborhood's other international institutions such as the Taipei American School and Taipei European School, the Center moved to its present site in 2022.

The Center typically hosts an annual auction as its fundraising event.

== Mental Health Counseling Services ==
As of May 2025, 15 counseling psychologists offer their services through the Center, each with masters- or doctoral-level degrees and registered with the Taipei Counseling Psychologist Association. The Center's counseling services are open to members of Taipei's international community as well as to multicultural families and overseas Taiwanese returnees.

== Publications ==
The Center publishes Center Focus, an email newsletter for the international community in Taipei.

The Center formerly published a print magazine, Centered on Taiwan (formerly titled Centered on Taipei), ending its publication run in 2024.

== See also ==
- Taiwan
- Taipei
