= 2024 China floods =

Significant rainfall across several Chinese provinces

- Date: April 14, 2024-ongoing
- Location: Guangdong, Anhui, Hunan, Jiangsu, Guizhou, Jiangxi
- Cause: Heavy rainfall
- Deaths: 71+
- Injuries: 6+
- Missing: 2
- Property damage: 5.05 billion yuan (~US$695 million)

Several floods caused by heavy rainfall struck in China starting in Guangdong Province in April 2024. Bands of heavy rainfall in June 2024 caused water levels to rise in rivers before moving northwards to other Southeastern and Central Chinese provinces, causing significantly raised water levels in the Yangtze River and the Pearl River Delta, inundating many towns and cities, forcing the relocation of hundreds of thousands of civilians, destroying several roads, structures, and farmland, and causing at least 71 deaths.

== Impact ==
=== Guangdong ===
Starting on 16 April 2024, Guangdong Province was stuck by significant rainfall and flooding, inundating homes and infrastructure, impacting millions, and forcing more than 110,000 residents to relocate. Forty-four rivers in the Pearl River Delta exceeded their warning water levels. Six people in Shaoguan were injured due to landslides. Over 80 houses suffered severe damage or complete destruction due to landslides and floods, resulting in a loss nearing 140 million yuan ($20 million).

On 16 June 2024, heavy rains hit Guangdong, with Pingyuan County receiving an average rainfall of 199 mm. The town of Sishui recorded the highest rainfall at 367mm, while three other locations reported rainfall exceeding 300mm. The persistent rain throughout the week led to severe flooding, landslides, and mudslides, with the Shiku and Songyuan rivers overflowing and causing widespread damage. Meizhou was significantly affected, where 48 people died after part of the Meidagao Section of the Meilong Expressway collapsed.

The rainfall and secondary disasters destroyed roughly 356 kilometers (221 miles) of road and damaged over a hundred bridges. Four deaths were reported in Meizhou's Meixian District, while Jiaoling County reported five fatalities. The Songyuan River, which flows through Meizhou, experienced its largest recorded flood. The combined disasters caused estimated losses of 3.65 billion yuan (US$502 million) in Jiaoling County and 1.06 billion yuan (US$146 million) in Meixian District.

=== Hunan ===
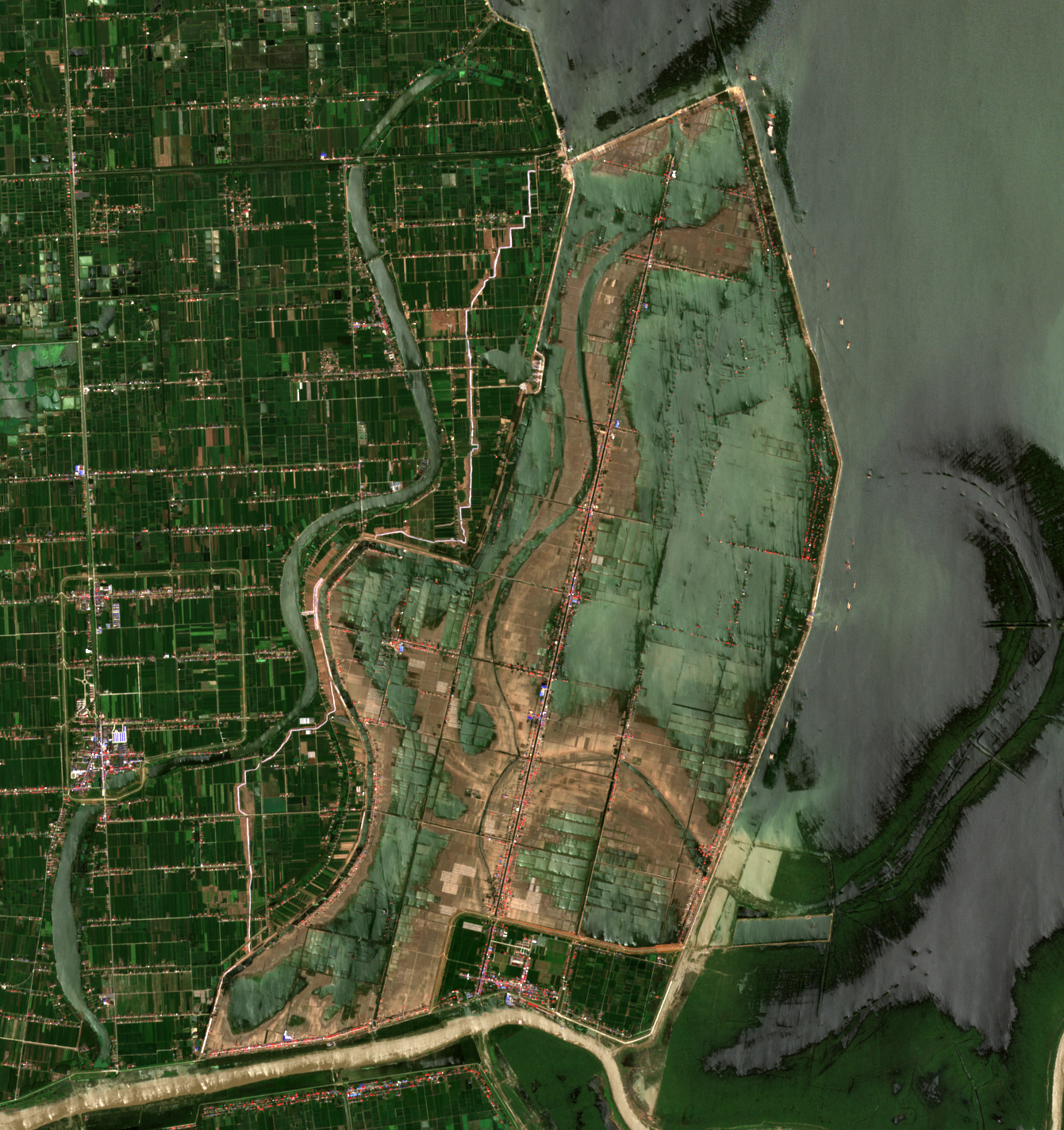
Satellite imagery showing aftermath of dike breach on Dongting Lake

Following extensive flooding in Guangdong province, forecasters anticipated that rain systems would move from the southern regions and shift northwards to Sichuan, Chongqing, and parts of Hubei, Henan, and Shandong. On 23 June, 65.1 millimetres of rainfall dropped on Hunan capital Changsha on Monday, setting a new record for the most hourly rainfall dropped on Changsha in June. The rain caused fully inundated several roads, subway tunnels, and pedestrian underpasses.

Pingjiang County recorded 759.6 mm of rainfall between 18 June and 1 July, the highest recorded in over 60 years. The Miluo River, monitored by the Pingjiang hydrological station, saw water levels rise by about 9.5 meters in 48 hours. River levels reached their peak at midnight on Monday, reaching 3.67 meters above the warning level, setting a record for the river's highest water level in 70 years. This prompted local authorities in Hunan to activate the maximum emergency response level (Level I). The flooding impacted approximately 340,000 people and disrupted numerous businesses, with state media displaying large parts of towns being waterlogged, requiring stranded individuals being rescued by boats.

Heavy rains in Miluo City triggered landslides, with at least two villagers reported missing on 1 July.

Five people in Yuanling County were found dead due to flooding.

In Huarong County, the dike of Tuanzhouyuan polder on Dongting Lake was breached, inundating 48 km^{2} of land, including several villages. 7,680 residents had already been evacuated from the area preventively.

=== Jiangsu ===
China's Ministry of Water Resources reported on 2 July that water levels in portions of the lower to middle courses of the Yangtze River exceeded 9.5 meters on 2 July, passing over the warning level by 0.8 meters. Authorities activated a second-level response for flood control on the evening of 2 July, with the lake previously recording its highest water level of 22.6 meters in July 2020.

By July 3, the Jiangsu section of the Yangtze River experienced a continuous rise in water levels due to increased flow from the river's upper reaches combined with persistent rainfall moving north from Guangdong province.

=== Anhui ===
Flooding caused by heavy rains in Anhui Province affected roughly 991,000 residents and necessitated the evacuation of about 242,000 people, requiring officials to updated their emergency response to Level-III to manage the disaster relief efforts. Rainstorms pushed waters above warning levels in six lakes and 20 rivers in Anhui. By 4 p.m. local time on 2 July, extensive damage was reported across 36 counties among seven prefecture-level cities.

Starting in June 22, Susong County experienced continuous downpours, flooding approximately 666 hectares of rice field seedlings and requiring local departments to drain the water in order to mitigate the damage.

=== Guizhou ===
Tongren City in Guizhou Province faced 140.2 mm of total rainfall in Bijiang District, and 157.2 mm in Wanshan District due to rapid water level increase in the Jinjiang River.

=== Jiangxi ===
Jiujiang City experienced continuous heavy rain from 1 July to 2 July that resulted in significant urban and rural flooding necessitating emergency evacuations with rubber rafts.

== Response ==
The China National Commission for Disaster Reduction have mobilized more than 50,000 people to monitor dikes and ensure the integrity of flood defenses in cities in Anhui near the Yangtze river. Several provinces, including Henan and Anhui, dispatched rescue operators in rubber rafts to rescue trapped and stranded civilians from floodwaters and submerged power lines. In Daping Town, 117 residents needed to be evacuated by firefighters in rubber rafts due to rising water levels, structure flooding, and fallen trees.

Anhui province's power supply department worked for two days starting on June 30 to construct a 1,500-meter-long power line, providing a stable power supply to water drainage devices to enable 24-hour operations to move out accumulated water and reduce flooding.

Nanjing, the capital of Jiangsu province, issued its second-highest flood warning, with the Nanjing Maritime Department banning various vessels, including passenger ferries, from entering or operating in the river's Jiangsu section to ensure safety.

The National Disease Control and Prevention Administration issued a directive to intensify efforts to prevent and manage schistosomiasis during the current flood season due to the water-borne prevalence of blood fluke larvae in 12 provincial-level regions within the Yangtze River basin and areas south of the river.

== See also ==
- 2020 China floods
- 2017 China floods
- 2011 China floods
