= Songyuan (disambiguation) =

Songyuan may refer to several things in China:

- Songyuan, a city in Jilin Province
- Songyuan, Zhejiang
- Songyuan, Fujian
- Songyuan, Guangdong
- Songyuan River, in Guangdong Province

Also:

- 23686 Songyuan, a Main-belt Asteroid
