= Xingnan =

Xingnan may refer to:

- Xingnan Elementary School, Zhonghe District, New Taipei City, Taiwan
- Xingnan Primary School, Singapore
- Xingnan metro station, a station of the Taoyuan Airport MRT
- Xingnan Subdistrict (杏南街道), Honggang District, Daqing, Heilongjiang province, China
- Xingnan Subdistrict, Nankai District, Tianjin, China
- Xingnan Village (兴南村), Zhanghua Town, Huarong County, Hunan Province, China
- Xingnan Village (興南里), Zhonghe District, New Taipei City, Taiwan
- Xingnan Village (興南里), Zhongli District, Taoyuan City, Taiwan
- Sima Xingnan (司馬興男), Emperor Kang of Jin‘s sister
