= Longfeng =

Longfeng is the pinyin romanization of various Chinese names. It may refer to:

- Longfeng District of Daqing, Heilongjiang
- Longfeng in Jiexiu Prefecture, Shanxi
