= Tuanzhou =

Tuanzhou 团洲乡
- Township
- Interactive map of Tuanzhou

Population (2006)
  - Total: 25,210

Tuanzhou is a township of Huarong County, Yueyang City. It is located on the south bank of Dongting Lake. The village is built on land that was reclaimed in 1977. Before then, the area was covered by reed fields. Due to the location on the confluence of two rivers flowing into Dongting Lake, it has a high risk of flooding, suffering from major floods in 1996 and 2024.

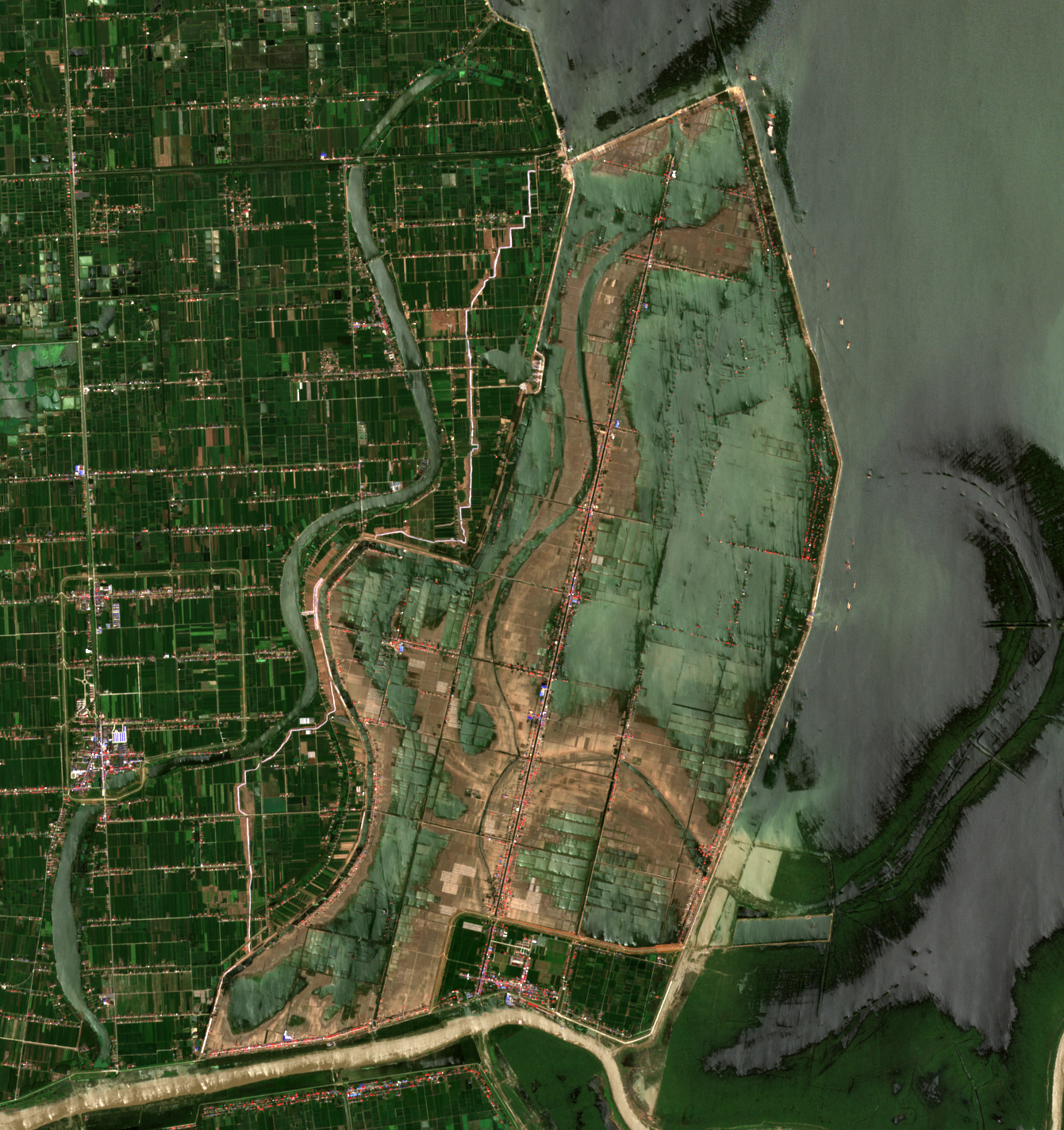
Satellite imagery showing aftermath of the 2024 dyke breach in Tuanzhou

On 19 July 1996, 14 died from flooding after a dyke failed in Tuanzhou.

In 2006, the population was 25,610.

On 5 July 2024, amidst heavy rainfalls and the 2024 China floods, the dyke on Dongting Lake was breached, inundating 48 km² of land, including several villages in Tuanzhou. In August 2024, the provincial government announced a permanent relocation plan for all 21,462 residents of the area flooded in that year.
