= Zhanghua =

Zhanghua may refer to:

== Taiwan ==
- Changhua City (彰化市), or Zhanghua from its pinyin name, the seat of Changhua County
- Changhua County (彰化縣), located in central Taiwan

== Mainland China ==
- Zhanghua, Hunan (章华镇), a town of Huarong County
- Zhanghua, Shandong (张华镇), town of Pingyuan County
