= Dörbet =

Dörbet may refer to:

- Dörbet Oirat, one of the four Oirat tribes of Dzungaria
- Eastern Dörbet, a Khorchin-Kharchin Mongol tribe
