= Yantongtun =

Yantongtun 烟筒屯镇 ᠶᠠᠨ ᠲᠦᠩ ᠲᠦᠨ ᠬᠣᠲᠠ
- Town
- Location within Heilongjiang Location within China
- Coordinates: 47°0′16″N 124°9′53″E
- Country: China
- Province: Heilongjiang
- City: Daqing
- County: Dorbod Mongol Autonomous County

Area
  - Total: 643 km^{2} (248 sq mi)
- Time zone: UTC+8 (China Standard)

Yantongtun (Chinese: 烟筒屯镇) Yan tüng tün (Mongolian: ᠶᠠᠨ
ᠲᠦᠩ
ᠲᠦᠨ ; Яань дүн түнь) is a town located in the Dorbod Mongol Autonomous County of Daqing, Heilongjiang, China.
