= Jiangwan Township =

Jiangwan Township 江湾乡 ᠵᠢᠶᠠᠩ ᠸᠠᠨ ᠰᠢᠶᠠᠩ
- Township
- Location within Heilongjiang Jiangwan Township (China)
- Coordinates: 46.584°N 123.89535°E
- Country: China
- Province: Heilongjiang
- Prefecture-level city: Daqing
- Autonomous county: Dorbod Mongol Autonomous County

Area
  - Total: 230.86 km^{2} (89.14 sq mi)

Population (2019)
  - Total: 7,794
  - Density: 33.76/km^{2} (87.44/sq mi)
- Time zone: UTC+8 (China Standard Time)

Jiangwan Township (simplified Chinese: 江湾乡; traditional Chinese: 江灣鄉; pinyin: Jiāngwān Xiāng) J̌iyang wan (Mongolian: ᠵᠢᠶᠠᠩ
ᠸᠠᠨ; Зян Вань) is a township situated in Dorbod Mongol Autonomous County, Daqing, Heilongjiang, China. The township spans an area of 230.86 square kilometres (89.14 mi^{2}), and has a hukou population of 7,794 as of 2019.

== Administrative divisions ==
Jiangwan Township administers two administrative villages: Jiushanmen Village (Chinese: 九扇门村) and Jiangwancun Village (Chinese: 江湾村村).

== See also ==
- List of township-level divisions of Heilongjiang
