= Taikang =

Taikang may refer to:

- Taikang County (太康县), of Zhoukou, Henan
- Tai Kang, king of the Xia Dynasty
- Taikang Life Insurance, major Chinese insurance company
- Taikang, Dorbod County (泰康镇), town in Dorbod Mongol Autonomous County, Heilongjiang, China
- Taikang Railway Station, in Heilongjiang, China
