= Dorbod =

Dorbod may refer to:

- Dörbet, a tribe of the Oirat people
- Dorbod Mongol Autonomous County, in Heilongjiang, China
- Dorbod Banner, a banner (county equivalent) in the Ulanqab region of Inner Mongolia, China
