= Yan Wenming =

Chinese archaeologist (1932–2024)

- 严文明
- Born: October 1932; Huarong County, Hunan, China
- Died: 14 April 2024 (aged 91); Beijing, China
- Occupation: Archaeologist

Academic background
- Education: Peking University

Academic work
- Discipline: Archaeology
- Sub-discipline: Neolithic

Chinese name
- Traditional Chinese: 嚴文明
- Simplified Chinese: 严文明
Transcriptions
Standard Mandarin
- Hanyu Pinyin: Yán Wénmíng

Yan Wenming (Chinese: 严文明; October 1932 – 14 April 2024) was a Chinese archaeologist who was a professor at Peking University. He was vice president of the Chinese Society of Archaeology.

== Biography ==
Yan was born in Huarong County, Hunan, in October 1932. After graduating from the History Department of Peking University in 1958, he stayed for teaching. He was promoted to full professor in December 1986 and to doctoral supervisor in 1990.

On 14 April 2024, he died in Beijing, at the age of 91.

== Publications ==
- 仰韶文化研究 [Research on Yangshao Culture] (in Chinese). Beijing: Cultural Relics Publishing House. 2009. ISBN 9787501026944.
- 足迹 考古随感录 [Footprints: Archaeological Essays] (in Chinese). Beijing: Cultural Relics Publishing House. 2011. ISBN 9787501032266.
- 中国新石器时代 [The Neolithic Age in China] (in Chinese). Beijing: Cultural Relics Publishing House. 2017. ISBN 9787501052325.
- 长江文明的曙光 [The Dawn of the Yangtze River Civilization] (in Chinese). Beijing: Cultural Relics Publishing House. 2020. ISBN 9787501066995.
- 丹霞集—考古学拾零 [Collections of Danxia] (in Chinese). Beijing: Cultural Relics Publishing House. 2020. ISBN 9787501062393.
- 耕耘记——流水年华 [Record of Cultivation: Flowing Years] (in Chinese). Beijing: Cultural Relics Publishing House. 2021. ISBN 9787501072293.
- 中国史前艺术 [Prehistoric Art of China] (in Chinese). Beijing: Cultural Relics Publishing House. 2022. ISBN 9787501077731.
