= Eastern Dörbet =

Territories of the Dörbed in 1911

The Dörbet (Mongolian: ᠳᠥᠷᠪᠡᠳ; simplified Chinese: 杜尔伯特部; traditional Chinese: 杜爾伯特部) or Dorbod clan is composed of descendants of Ainaga (爱纳嘎), the 16th grandson of Hasar. It is a subtribe of the Khorchin Mongols, along with the Gorlos. The name probably means "döröv"; "four" (Middle Mongolian: Dörben).

== See also ==
- Heilongjiang
  - Daqing
    - Dorbod Mongol Autonomous County
