= Taikang, Dorbod County =

Coordinates: 46°51′52″N 124°26′23″E

Taikang, Dorbod County Dorbod Town
- Subdistrict

Chinese transcription(s)
  - Chinese: 泰康镇
  - Pinyin: Tàikāng Zhèn
  - Chinese: 杜尔伯特镇
  - Pinyin: Dù'ěrbótè Zhèn

Mongolian transcription(s)
  - Traditional Script: ᠲᠠᠢ ᠺᠠᠩ ᠬᠣᠲᠠ
  - Mongolian Pinyin: Tai-kang Qota
  - Traditional Script: ᠳᠥᠷᠪᠡᠳ ᠬᠣᠲᠠ
  - Mongolian Pinyin: Dörbed Qota
- Interactive map of Taikang, Dorbod County
- Country: China
- Province: Heilongjiang
- City: Daqing
- County: Dorbod Mongol Autonomous County
- Time zone: UTC+8 (China Standard Time)

Taikang Town (simplified Chinese: 泰康镇; traditional Chinese: 泰康鎮; pinyin: Tàikāng Zhèn; Wade–Giles: T'ai-k'ang Chen) Dörbed (Mongolian: ᠳᠥᠷᠪᠡᠳ; Дөрвөд) is a township-level division of Daqing, in the province of Heilongjiang, China.

== See also ==
- List of township-level divisions of Heilongjiang
