= Sartu District =

District in Daqing, Heilongjiang province, China

Sartu District 萨尔图区
- District
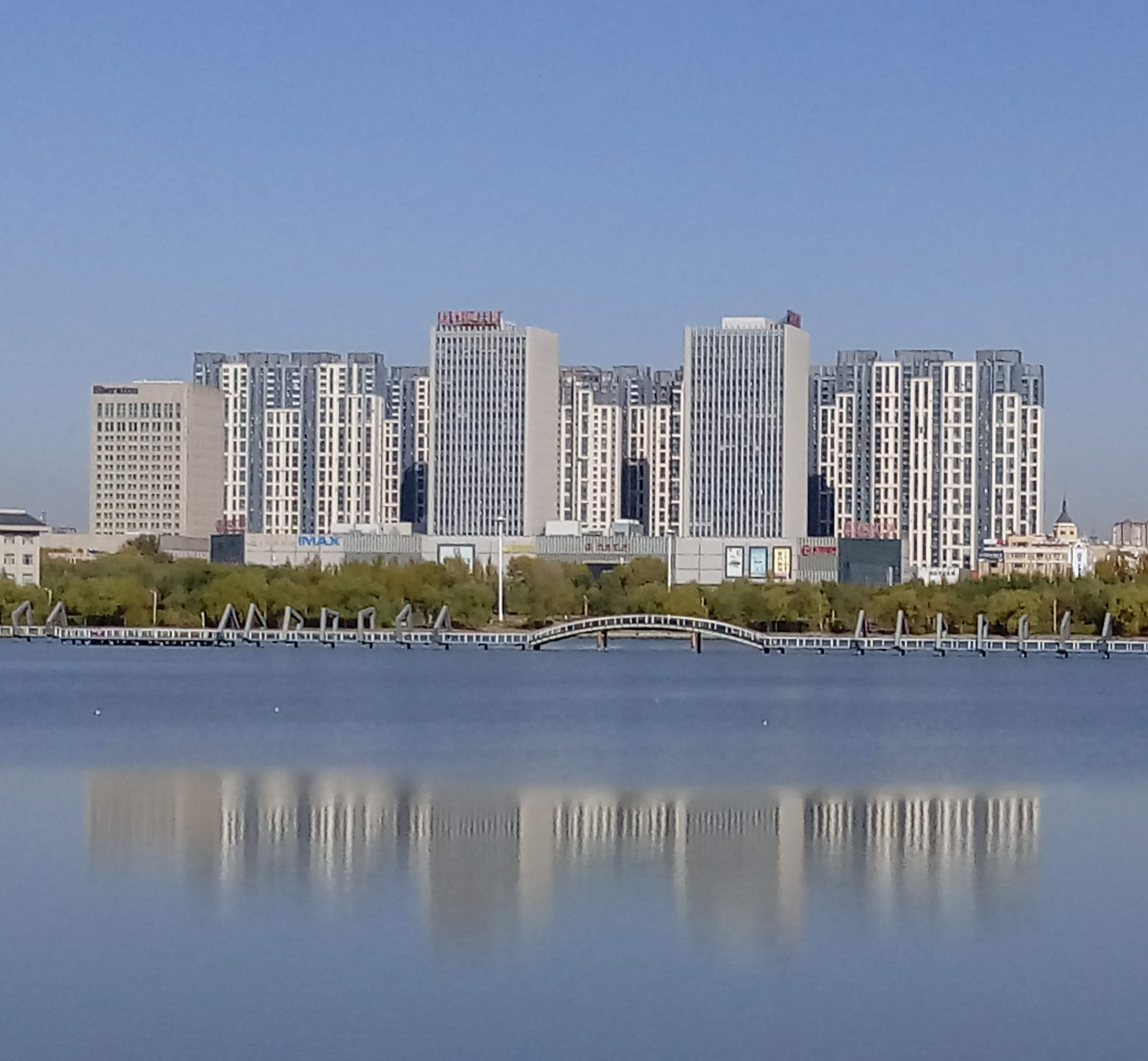
- Wanbao Lake in Sartu District, Daqing

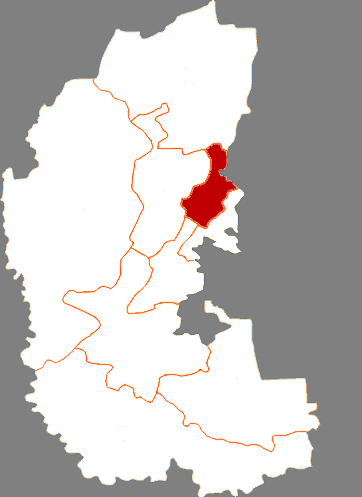
- Sartu in Daqing

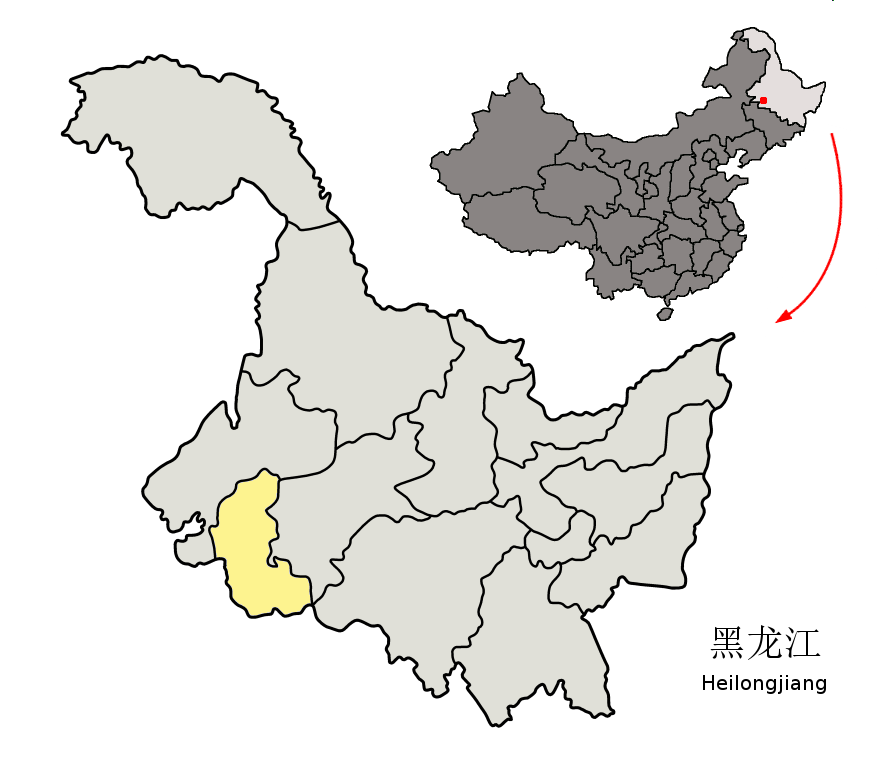
- Daqing in Heilongjiang
- Coordinates: 46°35′47″N 125°06′53″E
- Country: China
- Province: Heilongjiang
- Prefecture-level city: Daqing
- District seat: Gelin Subdistrict

Area
  - Total: 549 km^{2} (212 sq mi)

Population (2020 census)
  - Total: 327,192
  - Density: 596/km^{2} (1,540/sq mi)
- Time zone: UTC+8 (China Standard)
- Website: www.saertu.gov.cn

Sartu District (simplified Chinese: 萨尔图区; traditional Chinese: 薩爾圖區; pinyin: Sà'ěrtú Qū, literal meaning in Mongolian: where the moon rise) is a district of Daqing, Heilongjiang province, China.

== Administrative divisions ==
Sartu District is divided into 11 subdistricts.

Sartu (萨尔图街道), Huizhan (会战街道), Youyi (友谊街道), Dong'an (东安街道), Dongfeng (东风街道), Tieren (铁人街道), Huoju (火炬街道), Yongjun (拥军街道), Wanbao (万宝街道), Gelin (格林街道), Lüyuan (绿园街道)
