= Honggang District =

Coordinates: 46°19′26″N 124°54′33″E

Honggang 红岗区
- District
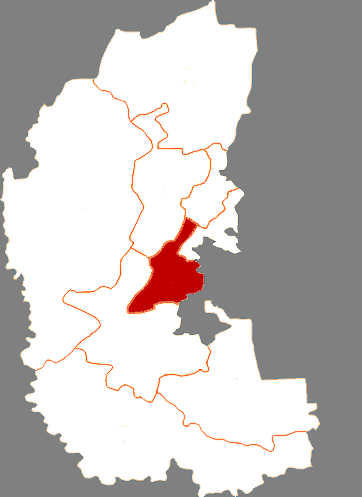
- Honggang in Daqing

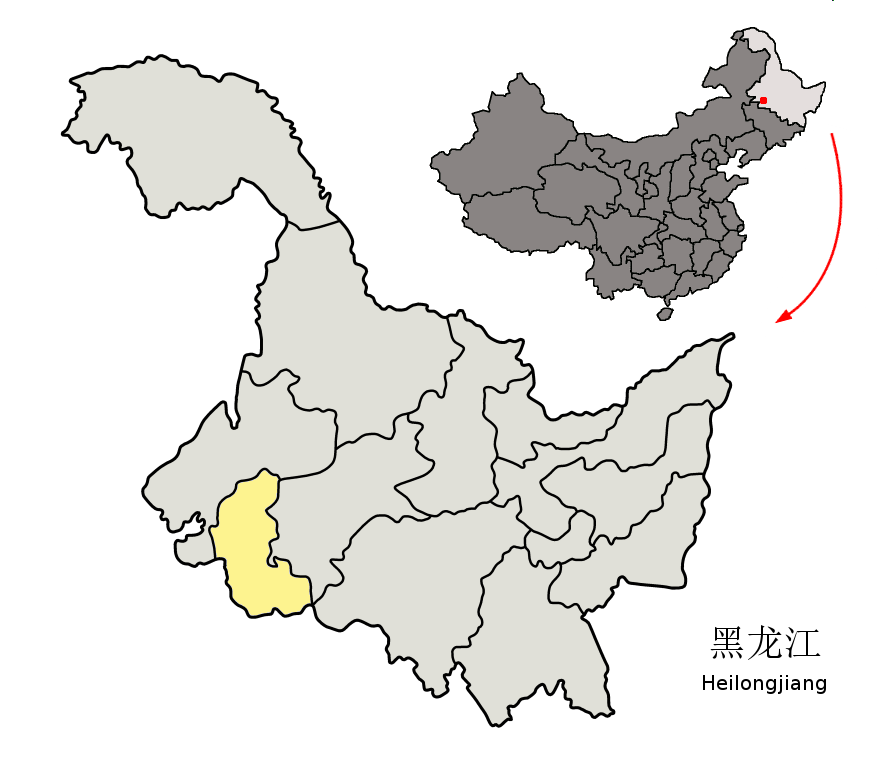
- Daqing in Heilongjiang
- Country: People's Republic of China
- Province: Heilongjiang
- Prefecture-level city: Daqing

Area
  - Total: 812 km^{2} (314 sq mi)

Population (2010)
  - Total: 130,000
  - Density: 160/km^{2} (410/sq mi)
- Time zone: UTC+8 (China Standard)

Honggang District (simplified Chinese: 红岗区; traditional Chinese: 紅崗區; pinyin: Hónggǎng Qū) is a district of the city of Daqing, Heilongjiang province, People's Republic of China.

== Administrative divisions ==
Honggang District is divided into 5 subdistricts and 1 township.

5 subdistricts

- Honggang (红岗街道), Babaishang (八百垧街道), Xingnan (杏南街道), Jiefang (解放街道), Chuangye (创业街道)

1 town

- Xingshugang (杏树岗镇)

== Notes and references ==
Administrative Division Code : 230605, Post Code : 163511, Phone Area Code :0459, The Prefix of Motor Vehicle License Plate : 黑E, The Prefix of Citizen Identity Card Number: 230605
