= Longfeng District =

Longfeng 龙凤区
- District
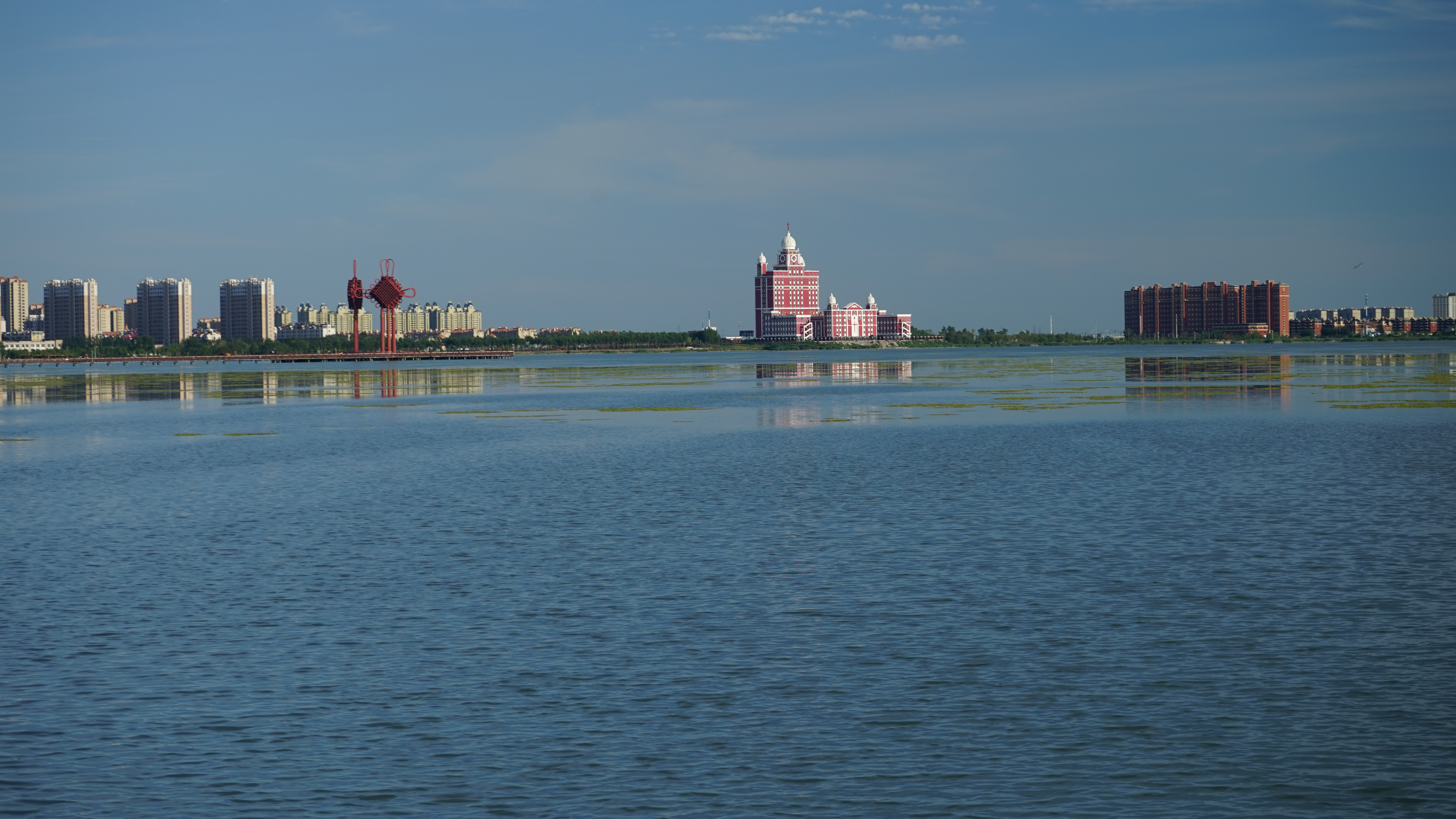
- Sanyong Lake, in Longfeng District

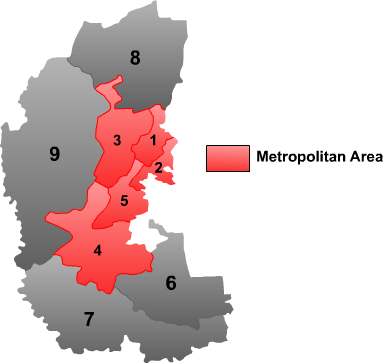
- Location of Longfeng ("2") within Daqing City

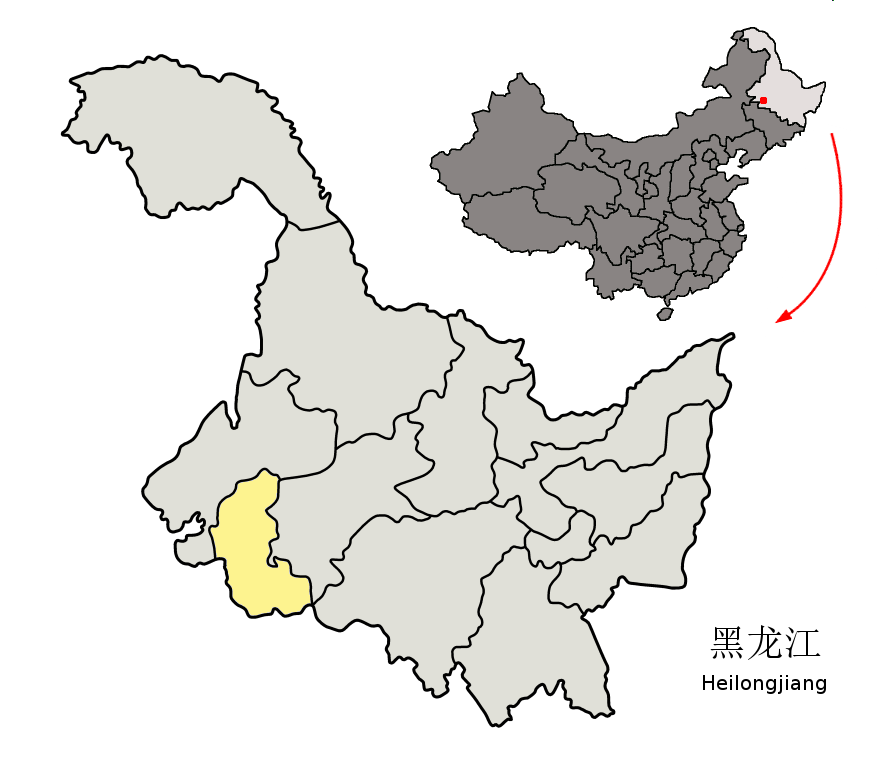
- Location of Daqing City in Heilongjiang
- Coordinates: 46°26′18″N 125°07′51″E
- Country: People's Republic of China
- Province: Heilongjiang
- Prefecture-level city: Daqing

Area
  - Total: 510 km^{2} (200 sq mi)

Population (2003)
  - Total: 160,000
  - Density: 310/km^{2} (810/sq mi)
- Time zone: UTC+8 (China Standard)

Longfeng District
- Traditional Chinese: 龍鳳區
- Simplified Chinese: 龙凤区
- Literal meaning: Dragon-&-Phoenix District
Transcriptions
Standard Mandarin
- Hanyu Pinyin: Lóngfèng qū
- Wade–Giles: Lung-fêng Ch‘ü

Longfeng District is a district of the city of Daqing, Heilongjiang Province, in the northeastern People's Republic of China.

== Administrative divisions ==
Longfeng District is divided into 7 subdistricts and 1 town.

7 subdistricts

- Longfeng (龙凤街道), Xinghua (兴化街道), Wolitun (卧里屯街道), Dongguang (东光街道), Sanyong (三永街道), Longzheng (龙政街道), Shidi (湿地街道)

1 town

- Longfeng (龙凤镇)
