= Huarong County =

Huarong County 华容县 Hwajung
- County
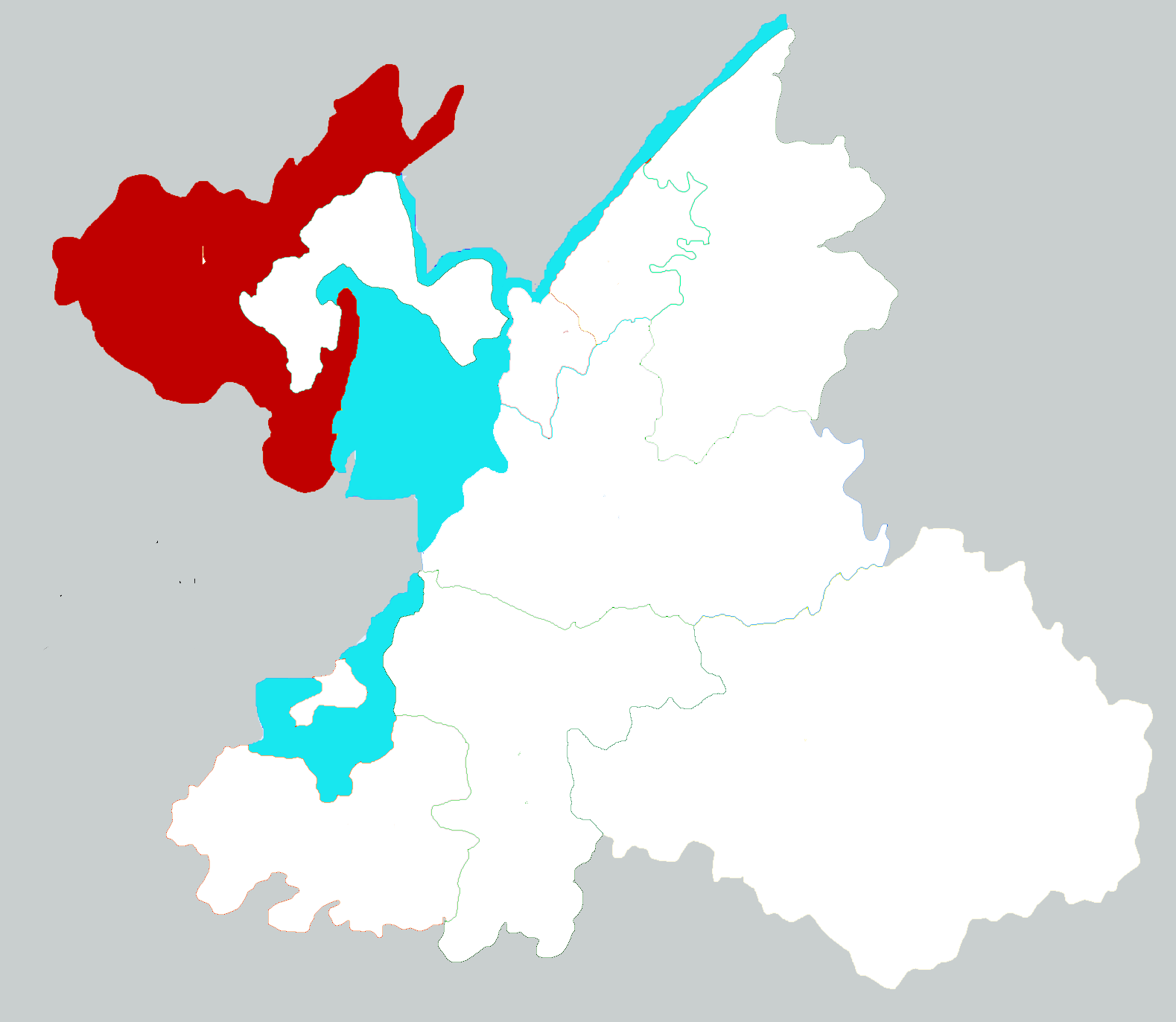
- Location of Huarong County within Yueyang

- Location of the seat in Hunan
- Coordinates: 29°29′10″N 112°40′23″E
- Country: People's Republic of China
- Province: Hunan
- Prefecture-level city: Yueyang
- Seat: Zhanghua

Area
  - Total: 1,590.98 km^{2} (614.28 sq mi)

Population (2020)
  - Total: 553,800
  - Density: 348.1/km^{2} (901.5/sq mi)
- Time zone: UTC+8 (China Standard)

Huarong County (simplified Chinese: 华容县; traditional Chinese: 華容縣; pinyin: Huáróng Xiàn) is a county in Hunan province, South Central part of China, it is under the administration of Yueyang City.

The county is located on the northeastern margin of the province, on the southern bank of the Yangtze River and on the northern bank of the Dongting Lake. Huarong County is bordered to the east and the southeast by Junshan District, to the southwest by Nanxian and Anxiang Counties, to the north by Shishou City of Hubei, and to the northeast by Jianli County of Hubei.

The county covers an area of 1,593 km^{2} (615 sq mi), and as of 2015, it had a registered population of 723,800 and a permanent resident population of 725,600. The county has 12 towns and 2 townships under its jurisdiction. The government seat is Zhanghua Town (章华镇).

== Administrative divisions ==
According to the result on adjustment of township-level administrative divisions of Huarong county on November 20, 2015, Huarong has 12 towns and 2 townships under its jurisdiction. They are:

2 townships

- Tuanzhou (团洲乡)
- Xinhe (新河乡)

12 towns

- Beijinggang (北景港镇)
- Caojun (操军镇)
- Chaqi (插旗镇)
- Dongshan (东山镇)
- Meitianhu (梅田湖镇)
- Nianyuxu (鲇鱼须镇)
- Sanfengsi (三封寺镇)
- Wanyu (万庾镇)
- Yushan (禹山镇)
- Zhanghua Town (章华镇)
- Zhihedu (治河渡镇)
- Zhuzikou (注滋口镇)

== Climate ==
Climate data for Huarong, elevation 50 m (160 ft), (1991–2020 normals, extremes 1981–2010)
Month	Jan	Feb	Mar	Apr	May	Jun	Jul	Aug	Sep	Oct	Nov	Dec	Year
Record high °C (°F)	22.4 (72.3)	28.4 (83.1)	32.1 (89.8)	35.3 (95.5)	35.3 (95.5)	37.9 (100.2)	39.3 (102.7)	39.7 (103.5)	37.3 (99.1)	33.5 (92.3)	30.1 (86.2)	23.0 (73.4)	39.7 (103.5)
Mean daily maximum °C (°F)	8.5 (47.3)	11.3 (52.3)	16.0 (60.8)	22.4 (72.3)	27.2 (81.0)	30.3 (86.5)	33.3 (91.9)	32.6 (90.7)	28.7 (83.7)	23.4 (74.1)	17.2 (63.0)	11.3 (52.3)	21.8 (71.3)
Daily mean °C (°F)	4.9 (40.8)	7.5 (45.5)	11.8 (53.2)	17.9 (64.2)	22.7 (72.9)	26.3 (79.3)	29.3 (84.7)	28.5 (83.3)	24.3 (75.7)	18.8 (65.8)	12.8 (55.0)	7.3 (45.1)	17.7 (63.8)
Mean daily minimum °C (°F)	2.4 (36.3)	4.6 (40.3)	8.7 (47.7)	14.5 (58.1)	19.3 (66.7)	23.2 (73.8)	26.2 (79.2)	25.4 (77.7)	21.1 (70.0)	15.6 (60.1)	9.7 (49.5)	4.4 (39.9)	14.6 (58.3)
Record low °C (°F)	−8.4 (16.9)	−4.6 (23.7)	−1.3 (29.7)	2.5 (36.5)	10.0 (50.0)	13.5 (56.3)	19.4 (66.9)	16.8 (62.2)	10.9 (51.6)	3.4 (38.1)	−1.2 (29.8)	−6.5 (20.3)	−8.4 (16.9)
Average precipitation mm (inches)	58.3 (2.30)	71.9 (2.83)	105.9 (4.17)	156.8 (6.17)	165.1 (6.50)	204.2 (8.04)	180.3 (7.10)	122.7 (4.83)	68.8 (2.71)	80.5 (3.17)	71.5 (2.81)	34.3 (1.35)	1,320.3 (51.98)
Average precipitation days (≥ 0.1 mm)	11.0	11.9	14.6	13.7	13.9	13.4	10.8	9.5	8.2	10.3	9.8	8.6	135.7
Average snowy days	5.4	3.0	1.3	0	0	0	0	0	0	0	0.3	1.7	11.7
Average relative humidity (%)	77	77	78	77	77	80	77	78	77	75	76	74	77
Mean monthly sunshine hours	76.9	77.1	102.8	130.6	145.2	144.9	203.7	205.1	150.1	132.3	117.5	100.6	1,586.8
Percentage possible sunshine	24	24	28	34	34	35	48	51	41	38	37	32	36
Source: China Meteorological Administration

== Notable people ==
- Yan Wenming, archaeologist.
