= Songyuan, Guangdong =

Songyuan 松源镇
- Town
- Location in Guangdong
- Coordinates (Songyuan Town government): 24°43′56″N 116°23′13″E
- Country: People's Republic of China
- Province: Guangdong
- Prefecture-level city: Meizhou
- District: Meixian

Area
  - Total: 149.5 km^{2} (57.7 sq mi)

Population (2017)
  - Total: 42,044
  - Density: 281.2/km^{2} (728.4/sq mi)
- Time zone: UTC+8 (China Standard)
- Postal code: 514733
- Area code: 0753

Songyuan (simplified Chinese: 松源镇; traditional Chinese: 松源鎮; pinyin: Sōngyuán Zhèn) is a town in the Meixian District of Meizhou, northeastern Guangdong Province, China, along the border with Fujian Province to the northeast. It has a population of about 42,044 as of 2017 residing in an area of 149.5 km^{2} (57.7 sq mi).

== Etymology ==
Songyuan is located in the upper reaches of the Songyuan River, which gives the town its name.

== History ==
In ancient times, Songyuan was densely forested with pine trees. The Hakka people of the Song Dynasty entered the region of present-day Guangdong through the town.

=== Chinese Civil War ===
The Communist Party established a branch in Songyuan in Autumn of 1926. In 1928, communist forces established a district committee in the area. On October 19, 1929, under the command of Zhu De, more than 6,000 soldiers from the Fourth Red Army entered the town.

During the Anti-Japanese War, communist forces operated guerrilla bases in the area, and recruited a number of locals to fight in the war.

== Geography ==
Songyuan is a town in the northeast of Meixian District of Meizhou City, Guangdong. It is located in northeastern Meixian District, bordering Yongding Dististrict in Fujian Province to the east, the towns of Longwen and Taoyao to the south, the town of Nanqi to the west, and the counties of Jiaoling, Shanghang, and Wuping in Fujian Province to the north. Surrounded by mountains, in the middle is basin, Songyuan is the hub of eight towns and villages and five counties of two provinces.

Songyuan has a population of 42,044 residing in an area of 149.5 km^{2} (57.7 sq mi). In the area of 149.5 square kilometers, there are 26,000 mu of arable land, 17.12 million mu of woodland area, 0.25 million mu of aquaculture, and 3.5 square kilometers of built-up land.

Mineral resources in Songyuan include manganese, iron, uranium, coal, gold, porcelain clay, and limestone. The two main mines in the town are the Baokeng Manganese Mine and the Yangge Iron Ore mine.

== Administrative divisions ==
Songyuan comprises 2 residential committees and 22 villages.

=== Residents' committee ===
The town's two residential committees are Songyuan Town Committee and the Baokeng Residential Committee.

=== Villages ===
Villages
Caishan (彩山)	Huangkeng (黄坑)	Jingkou (径口)	Yuanling (园岭)	Xinnan (新南)
Yuantan (园潭)	Qingtan (青潭)	Dongwang (东王)	Jinxing (金星)	Wuxing (五星)
Heyu (荷玉)	Wanxi (湾溪)	Yangge (杨阁)	Qiaoshi (桥市)	Hengfang (横坊)
Hualian (化联)	Baiyu (白玉)	Anbei (案背)	Haoxiu (豪秀)	Qiaobei (桥背)
Huwei (湖维)	Baokeng (宝坑)			

== Economy ==
Songyuan Economic Indicators
Statistic	2014 Value (RMB)	2017 Value (RMB)
GDP	638 million	777 million
Rural Revenue	448 million	595 million
Fixed-asset Investments	49.24 million	49.24 million
Industrial & Commercial Revenue	5.228 million	5.014 million
Government Revenue	16.649 million	17.218 million
Average Rural Net Income	9,416	15,813

=== Agriculture ===
Songyuan is a largely agrarian town, with major crops including rice, tobacco, and pomelos. In 2017, the town grew 498.06 hectares of tobacco, 1,933.33 hectares of grain (of which, 1,788.87 hectares was rice), 740 hectares of golden pomelos, and 673.33 hectares of honey pomelos. In 2014, the town reported having 19,800 heads of pigs, and 34,500 heads of poultry.

== Education ==
=== Songyuan Central Kindergarten ===
Songyuan Central Kindergarten (松源镇中心幼儿园) is a kindergarten in Songyuan which spans an area of 2,751 square meters, has 26 teachers, and enrolls 313 students.

=== Songyuan Central Primary School ===
Songyuan Central Primary School (松源镇中心小学) is a primary school in Songyuan established in 1941. The school's campus covers an area of 19,295 square meters, and has five buildings where instruction takes place. The school also has a standard football pitch, basketball courts, badminton courts, and playgrounds. As of 2014, the school has a total of 33 primary school classes, 981 students, and 103 faculty members.

=== Songyuan Middle School ===
Songyuan Middle School was established in 1906 as Chengda Senior Primary School (成达高等小学). In 1925, the school was changed into a junior high school and named Songyuan Public School (松源公学). In February 1951, it was renamed Songyuan Middle School (松源中学), which stands as its current name.

The school's campus covers an area of 77,100 square meters, of which, 50,600 square meters, or 65.3%, is green space. The overall campus is divided into separate teaching areas, sports areas, and living quarters.

As of 2014, there were 106 teaching staff, 105 full-time teachers, and 91 faculty members with bachelor's degrees. 13 of the staff has senior teacher qualifications, and 74 has junior teacher qualifications. There were 723 students at school in 2014.

== Culture ==
=== Carry the Prince ===
During the middle of the eighth month of the Chinese Lunar Calendar, the town of Songyuan holds a celebration titled "Carry the Prince" (扛公王), in which the townspeople replicate a visit from an ancient prince. The festival entails the carrying of the "Longyuan Prince" (龙源公王) from "Longyuan Palace" (龙源宫) to the village. The celebration is complete with traditional Chinese music, firecrackers, traditional food, and prayers for wealth, prosperity, and a bountiful grain harvest.

=== Gua Dapai ===
Since the Song Dynasty, Songyuan has been home to a festival titled Gua Dapai (挂大牌), also known as Zou Dapai (走大牌), in honor of an ancient figure from Songyuan. The festival involves traditional Chinese music, gambling, and handicrafts. The festival takes place annually on the 28th lunar month.

== Tourism ==
The town is home to a number of tourist attractions, including Wangshou Mountain (王寿山), the Double Faucet Waterfall (双龙头瀑布), the Cai Mengji Residence, and Guiyuan Pond (桂渊溏).

=== Wangshou Mountain ===
Wangshou Mountain (王寿山) is a mountain on the border of Songyuan and Hongshan Township in Yongding County, Fujian Province. The main peak of Wangshou Mountain is 1,242 meters above sea level, and is covered by pines, firs, and other trees. The mountain is also covered in many tea leaves and fruits. The toponymy of the mountain is unknown.

A variety of birds and other animals live in the mountain, including pheasants, wild boars, leopards, and wolves. It is also suspected that the South China Tiger was active in this area up until the 1970s and 1980s.

The mountain's main sites are the Chessboard Stone and the Xiangguang Temple.

=== Cai Mengji Residence ===
Songyuan is home to the Cai Mengji Residence, said to be the oldest surviving Hakka residence, dating back to approximately 1132. Cai Mengji, a Southern Song poet who unsuccessfully lead an army to fight off the Yuan Dynasty, lived in the house in the late 13th century. The property spans 1,500 square meters, with the house itself spanning 800 square meters. In June 2009, the Meizhou government and descendants of Cai Mengji raised funds to repair the house, which finished repairs in October 2012.

== Cuisine ==
=== Songyuan Maltose ===
Songyuan produces its own variant of maltose (麦芽糖), which has a sweat taste and is alleged to have healing properties by locals. Songyuan maltose mainly uses malt sugar, rice, and wheat as the main ingredients. The local recipe calls for the wheat to be germinated for five to six days, then mixed with the braised rice and malt sugar, fermented for six to seven hours, and then heated until it becomes white in color.

=== Dried tofu ===
Dried tofu (豆腐干) is a staple in Songyuan. Migrant workers who live in Songyuan often bring Songyuan dried tofu with them to their city of work, and dried tofu vendors are a common sight in Songyuan during holidays and festivities.

=== Bamboo shoots ===
Bitter bamboo shoots (苦笋), sweet bamboo shoots (甘笋), and cool bamboo shoots (凉笋) grow in nearby mountains and are commonly eaten in Songyuan.
