= Dorbod Mongol Autonomous County =

Dorbod County
- Autonomous county
- 杜尔伯特蒙古族自治县 · ᠳᠥᠷᠪᠡᠳ ᠮᠣᠩᠭᠣᠯ ᠦᠨᠳᠦᠰᠦᠲᠡᠨ ᠦ ᠥᠪᠡᠷᠲᠡᠭᠡᠨ ᠵᠠᠰᠠᠬᠤ ᠰᠢᠶᠠᠨ; Dorbod Mongol Autonomous County
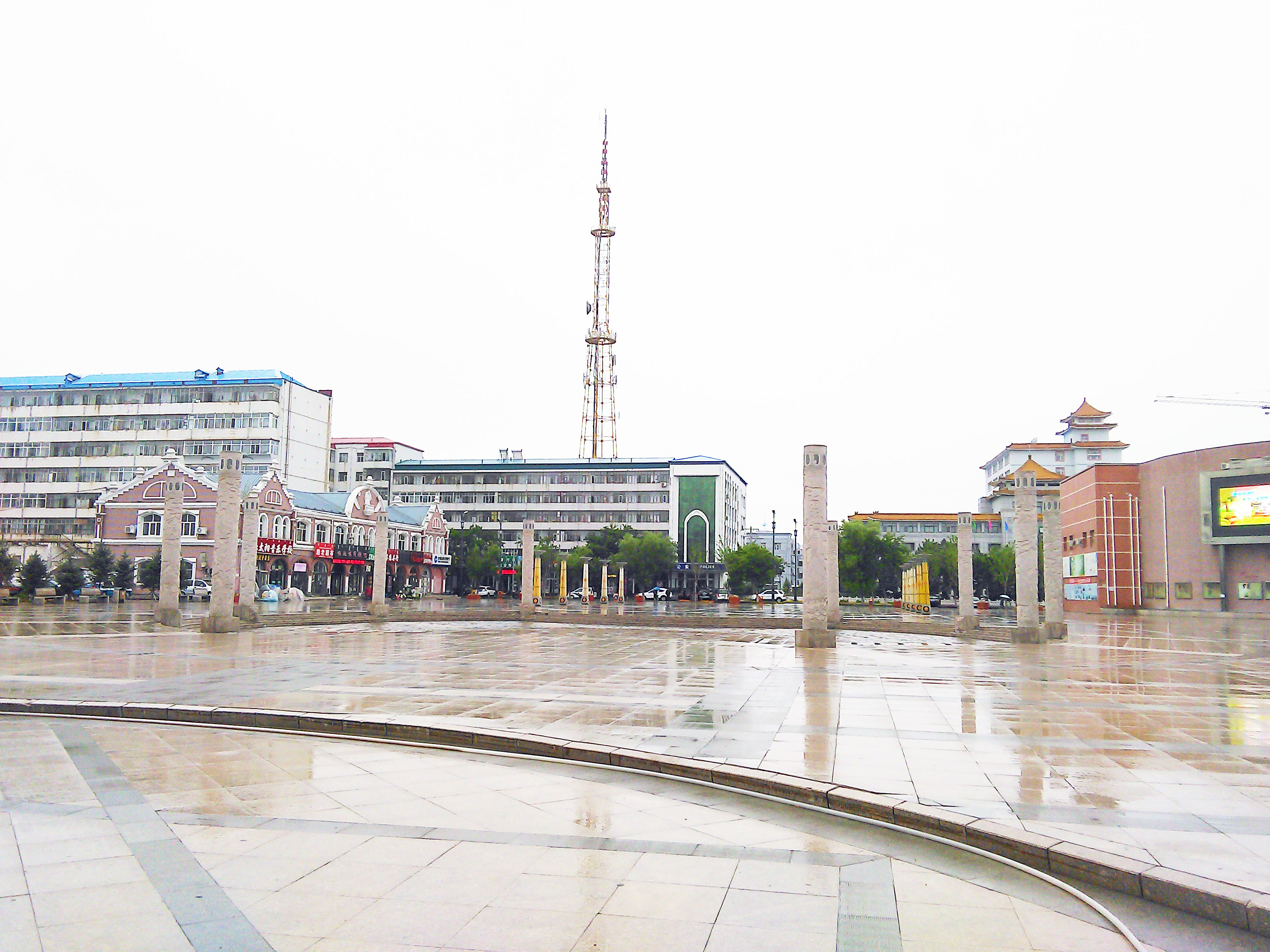

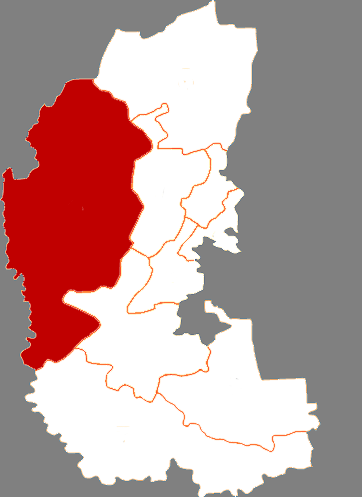
- Dorbod in Daqing

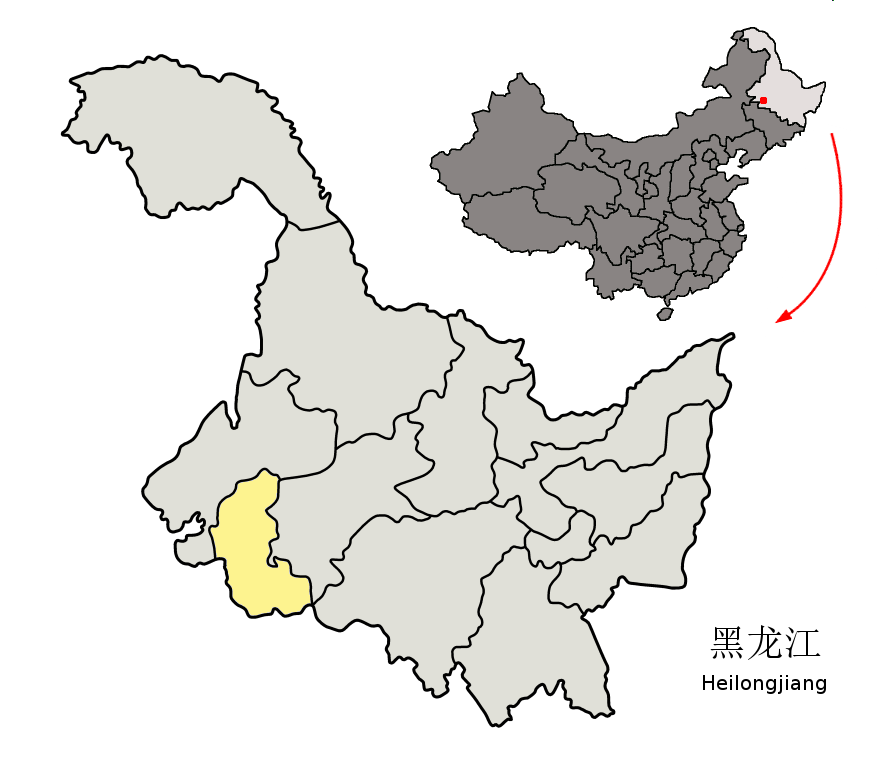
- Daqing in Heilongjiang
- Coordinates: 46°51′46″N 124°26′33″E
- Country: China
- Province: Heilongjiang
- Prefecture-level city: Daqing
- County seat: Dorbod Town (Taikang)

Area
  - Total: 6,427 km^{2} (2,481 sq mi)

Population (2020 census)
  - Total: 199,293
  - Density: 31.01/km^{2} (80.31/sq mi)
- Time zone: UTC+8 (China Standard)
- Website: www.drbt.gov.cn

Dorbod Mongol Autonomous County

Chinese name
- Simplified Chinese: 杜尔伯特蒙古族自治县
- Traditional Chinese: 杜爾伯特蒙古族自治縣
Transcriptions
Standard Mandarin
- Hanyu Pinyin: Dù'ěrbótè Ménggǔzú Zìzhìxiàn

Mongolian name
- Mongolian Cyrillic: Дөрвөд Монгол үндэстний өөртөө засах шянь
- Mongolian script: ᠳᠥᠷᠪᠡᠳ ᠮᠣᠩᠭᠣᠯ ᠦᠨᠳᠦᠰᠦᠲᠡᠨ ᠦ ᠥᠪᠡᠷᠲᠡᠭᠡᠨ ᠵᠠᠰᠠᠬᠤ ᠰᠢᠶᠠᠨ
Transcriptions
- SASM/GNC: dörbed moŋɣol ündüsüten-ü öbertegen ǰasaꭓu siyan

Dorbod Mongol Autonomous County (Chinese: 杜尔伯特蒙古族自治县; Mongolian: ᠳᠥᠷᠪᠡᠳ ᠮᠣᠩᠭᠣᠯ ᠦᠨᠳᠦᠰᠦᠲᠡᠨ ᠦ ᠥᠪᠡᠷᠲᠡᠭᠡᠨ ᠵᠠᠰᠠᠬᠤ ᠰᠢᠶᠠᠨ) is a county in the west of Heilongjiang province, China, bordering Jilin province to the southwest. It is under the jurisdiction of the prefecture-level city of Daqing. The county is named after the Dörbed Mongols. It was known as Dorbod Banner (杜尔伯特旗) before 1956 and Taikang County (泰康县) during Republican period.

== Administrative divisions ==
Dorbod Mongol Autonomous County is divided into 5 towns and 6 townships.

Name	Simplified Chinese	Hanyu Pinyin	Mongolian (Hudum Script)	Mongolian (Cyrillic)	Administrative division code
Towns
Dorbod Town (Taikang)	杜尔伯特镇 (泰康镇)	Dù'ěrbótè Zhèn (Tàikāng Zhèn)	ᠳᠥᠷᠪᠡᠳ ᠪᠠᠯᠭᠠᠰᠤ (ᠲᠠᠢ ᠺᠠᠩ ᠪᠠᠯᠭᠠᠰᠤ)	Дөрвөд балгас	230624100
Huzhultuhum Town (Hujitumo)	胡吉吐莫镇	Hújítǔmò Zhèn	ᠬᠣᠵᠤᠤᠯ ᠲᠥᠬᠥᠮ ᠪᠠᠯᠭᠠᠰᠤ	Хожуул дөхөм балгас	230624101
Yantongtun Town	烟筒屯镇	Yāntǒngtún Zhèn	ᠶᠠᠨ ᠲᠦᠩ ᠲᠦᠨ ᠪᠠᠯᠭᠠᠰᠤ	Яань дүн түнь балгас	230624102
Talaha Town (Taliin Hiag)	他拉哈镇	Tālāhā Zhèn	ᠲᠠᠯ᠎ᠠ ᠶᠢᠨ ᠬᠢᠶᠠᠭ ᠪᠠᠯᠭᠠᠰᠤ	Талын хиаг балгас	230624103
Lianhuanhu Town	连环湖镇	Liánhuánhú Zhèn	ᠯᠢᠶᠠᠨ ᠬᠤᠸᠠᠨ ᠬᠤ ᠪᠠᠯᠭᠠᠰᠤ	Ляньхуаньху балгас	230624104
Townships
Yixin Township	一心乡	Yīxīn Xiāng	ᠢ ᠰᠢᠨ ᠰᠢᠶᠠᠩ	И шинь шиян	230624200
Herstai Township	克尔台乡	Kè'ěrtái Xiāng	ᠬᠡᠷᠡᠰᠦᠲᠠᠢ ᠰᠢᠶᠠᠩ	Хэрстэй шиян	230624201
Aolinxibo Township (Oroigin Xibee)	敖林西伯乡	Áolínxībó Xiāng	ᠣᠷᠣᠢ ᠶᠢᠨ ᠰᠢᠪᠡᠭᠡ ᠰᠢᠶᠠᠩ	Оройын шивээ шиян	230624203
Bayan Qagan Township (Bayanchagan)	巴彦查干乡	Bāyànchágān Xiāng	ᠪᠠᠶ᠋ᠠᠨᠴᠠᠭᠠᠨ ᠰᠢᠶᠠᠩ	Баянцагаан шиян	230624204
Yaoxin Township (Dund Xin Ail)	腰新乡	Yāoxīn Xiāng	ᠳᠤᠮᠳᠠ ᠰᠢᠨ᠎ᠡ ᠠᠢᠯ ᠰᠢᠶᠠᠩ	Дунд шинэ айл шиян	230624205
Jiangwan Township	江湾乡	Jiāngwān Xiāng	ᠵᠢᠶᠠᠩ ᠸᠠᠨ ᠰᠢᠶᠠᠩ	Зян Вань шиян	230624206
Analogous township level units
Lusecaoyuan Ranch	绿色草原牧场	Lǜsècǎoyuán mùchǎng	ᠯᠢᠦᠢ ᠰᠧ ᠼᠣᠤ ᠶᠤᠸᠠᠨ ᠮᠠᠯᠵᠢᠯ ᠤᠨ ᠲᠠᠯᠠᠪᠠᠢ	Люисецаоюань малжлын талбай	230624500
Dashan Sheep Breeding Farm	大山种羊场	Dàshān zhǒngyángchǎng	ᠲᠣᠮᠤ ᠠᠭᠤᠯᠠ ᠡᠭᠦᠯᠳᠡᠷ ᠦᠨ ᠮᠠᠯ ᠤᠨ ᠲᠠᠯᠠᠪᠠᠢ	Том уул үүлдерийн хонин талбай	230624501

== Demographics ==
The population of the county was 243,829 in 1999.

== Climate ==
Climate data for Dorbod, elevation 145 m (476 ft), (1991–2020 normals, extremes 1981–2010)
Month	Jan	Feb	Mar	Apr	May	Jun	Jul	Aug	Sep	Oct	Nov	Dec	Year
Record high °C (°F)	−0.5 (31.1)	9.4 (48.9)	20.7 (69.3)	31.8 (89.2)	35.9 (96.6)	40.5 (104.9)	39.5 (103.1)	36.1 (97.0)	33.8 (92.8)	27.1 (80.8)	15.3 (59.5)	5.8 (42.4)	40.5 (104.9)
Mean daily maximum °C (°F)	−12.3 (9.9)	−6.4 (20.5)	2.7 (36.9)	13.3 (55.9)	21.5 (70.7)	26.8 (80.2)	28.6 (83.5)	26.8 (80.2)	21.2 (70.2)	11.7 (53.1)	−1.0 (30.2)	−10.6 (12.9)	10.2 (50.3)
Daily mean °C (°F)	−17.8 (0.0)	−12.7 (9.1)	−3.3 (26.1)	7.3 (45.1)	15.7 (60.3)	21.5 (70.7)	24.0 (75.2)	22.0 (71.6)	15.7 (60.3)	6.4 (43.5)	−5.7 (21.7)	−15.4 (4.3)	4.8 (40.7)
Mean daily minimum °C (°F)	−22.2 (−8.0)	−18.0 (−0.4)	−8.8 (16.2)	1.5 (34.7)	9.9 (49.8)	16.3 (61.3)	19.6 (67.3)	17.8 (64.0)	10.8 (51.4)	1.8 (35.2)	−9.6 (14.7)	−19.3 (−2.7)	0.0 (32.0)
Record low °C (°F)	−36.8 (−34.2)	−32.6 (−26.7)	−23.2 (−9.8)	−10.6 (12.9)	−0.8 (30.6)	3.9 (39.0)	12.0 (53.6)	9.7 (49.5)	−0.7 (30.7)	−12.3 (9.9)	−25.4 (−13.7)	−32.2 (−26.0)	−36.8 (−34.2)
Average precipitation mm (inches)	1.4 (0.06)	2.1 (0.08)	5.2 (0.20)	19.2 (0.76)	32.9 (1.30)	82.3 (3.24)	134.6 (5.30)	94.8 (3.73)	44.6 (1.76)	17.0 (0.67)	4.1 (0.16)	3.1 (0.12)	441.3 (17.38)
Average precipitation days (≥ 0.1 mm)	4.1	3.1	3.8	5.7	8.8	11.4	13.7	11.6	8.9	5.2	4.6	6.2	87.1
Average snowy days	6.8	5.0	5.4	2.7	0.2	0	0	0	0	2.1	6.2	8.5	36.9
Average relative humidity (%)	68	60	51	47	49	61	72	73	65	58	62	69	61
Mean monthly sunshine hours	176.8	206.8	251.6	235.7	246.9	234.1	226.1	224.8	226.8	209.4	170.9	153.4	2,563.3
Percentage possible sunshine	64	71	68	57	52	49	47	52	61	63	62	59	59
Source: China Meteorological Administration
