= Meixian, Meizhou =

Meixian 梅县区
- District
- District of Meixian
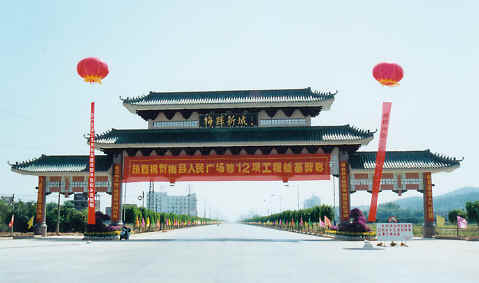

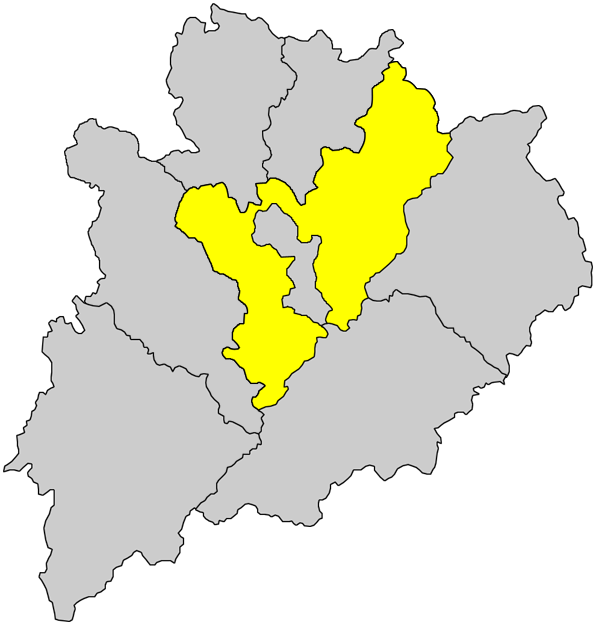
- Location of the district in Meizhou

- Location in Guangdong
- Coordinates: 24°19′17″N 116°07′10″E
- Country: People's Republic of China
- Province: Guangdong
- Prefecture-level city: Meizhou

Area
  - Total: 2,755.36 km^{2} (1,063.85 sq mi)

Population (2020 census)
  - Total: 556,735
  - Density: 202.055/km^{2} (523.321/sq mi)
- Time zone: UTC+8 (China Standard)
- Website: www.gdmx.gov.cn

Meixian, Meizhou
- Traditional Chinese: 梅縣
- Simplified Chinese: 梅县
- Hakka: Mòi-yen (IPA: [mɔi˩jɛn˥˧])
- Literal meaning: Plum County
Transcriptions
Standard Mandarin
- Hanyu Pinyin: Méixiàn
Hakka
- Romanization: Mòi-yen (IPA: [mɔi˩jɛn˥˧])
Yue: Cantonese
- Jyutping: Mui4 Jyun6

Former Name (Ming dynasty)
- Traditional Chinese: 程鄕
- Simplified Chinese: 程乡
Transcriptions
Standard Mandarin
- Hanyu Pinyin: Chengxiang

Meixian District (Chinese: 梅县区) is a district of Meizhou Prefecture, Guangdong, China, bordering Fujian Province to the east. The district is an important Hakka settlement and is the ancestral home of many Hakka descendants living in Taiwan and other countries worldwide.

== History ==
Meixian was a rural peasant county with the exception of a city called Songkou, and its original name was Chengxiang county (程鄕) founded at the southern Han Dynasty where it was first created. It was part of Hakka Jiayingzhou during the Ming empire. It only obtained its current rename during the Kuomintang Republic of China.

== Geography ==
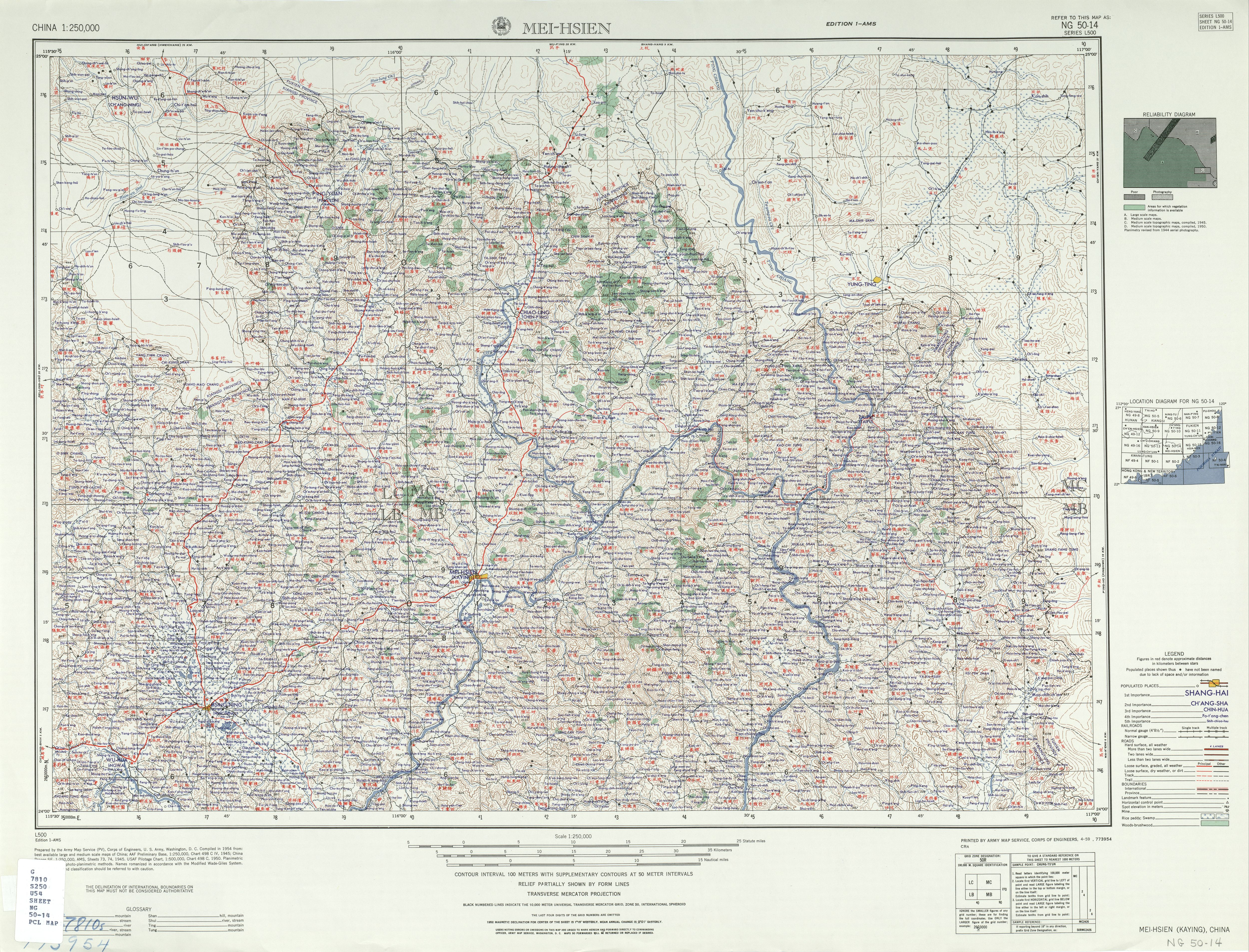
Map including Meixian (MEI-HSIEN 梅縣 (KAYING)) area (1954)

Meixian almost completely surrounds Meizhou's central urban Meijiang District. This is due to the old urban core of Meixian becoming separated from the bulk of the county in the territorial reorganization following the 1949 establishment of the People's Republic of China, when it was given equal status.

== Ethno-linguistic make-up ==
Meixian is noted for its large Hakka population.

== Administrative divisions ==
Meixian has administrative jurisdiction over one subdistrict and 18 towns.

Subdistrict

- Xincheng (Chinese: 新城街道)

Towns

- Chendong (城东镇)
- Shisan (石扇镇)
- Meixi (梅西镇)
- Daping (大坪镇)
- Shikeng (石坑镇)
- Shuiche (水车镇)
- Meinan (梅南镇)
- Bincun (丙村镇)
- Baidu (白渡镇)
- Songyuan (松源镇)
- Longwen (隆文镇)
- Taoyao (桃尧镇)
- Shejiang (畲江镇)
- Yanyang (雁洋镇)
- Songkou (松口镇)
- Nankou (南口镇)
- Chengjiang (程江镇)
- Fuda (扶大镇)

== Culture ==
With a majority Hakka population, Meixian, along with Dabu County, is known as the home of Standard Hakka.
