= Zhanghua, Hunan =

Town in Huarong County, Hunan, China

Zhanghua 章华镇
- Town
- Location in Hunan
- Coordinates: 29°32′15″N 112°32′45″E
- Country: People's Republic of China
- Province: Hunan
- Prefecture-level city: Yueyang
- County: Huarong County
- Time zone: UTC+8 (China Standard)

Zhanghua Town (Chinese: 章华镇; pinyin: Zhānghuá Zhèn) is a town and the county seat of Huarong in Hunan, China. The town was reformed through the amalgamation of Hucheng Township (Chinese: 护城乡), Shengfeng Township (Chinese: 胜峰乡) and Chengguan Town (Chinese: 城关镇) on November 20, 2015. The town is located in the northern Huarong County, it is bordered by Shishou City of Hubei Province to the northeast, Sanfengsi Town (Chinese: 三封寺镇) and Zhihedu Town (Chinese: 治河渡镇) to the east, Xinhe Township (Chinese: 新河乡) to the south, Nianyuxu Town (Chinese: 鲇鱼须镇) to the northwest, and Wanyu Town (Chinese: 万庾镇) to the northwest. The town has an area of 122.7 km^{2} (47.4 sq mi) with a population of 143,200 (as of 2015). Through the amalgamation of villages on May 26, the town has 14 villages and 18 communities, its seat is Huancheng Community (Chinese: 环城社区).

== History ==
Zhanghua Town was named after the ancient place of Clay Platform of Zhanghua (Chinese: 章华台) located in Qingshui Village (modern Shilipu Village), northeast of the county seat. According to legend, the Clay Platform was palace ruins of King Ling of Chu (540–529 BC; Chinese: 楚靈王).

== Administrative divisions ==
Administrative divisions of Zhanghua Town (2016 - present)
village-level divisions (14 villages and 18 communities)		former township-level	
English	Chinese	English	Chinese
Fengxing Village	凤形村	Shengfeng Township	胜峰乡
Hengti Village	横堤村	Hucheng Township	护城乡
Huagang Village	话岗村	Shengfeng Township	胜峰乡
Lishu Village	栗树村	Shengfeng Township	胜峰乡
Pushentang Village	普圣堂村	Hucheng Township	护城乡
Qianfeng Village	前锋村	Shengfeng Township	胜峰乡
Sanhe Village	三河村	Hucheng Township	护城乡
Shifu Village	石伏村	Shengfeng Township	胜峰乡
Shilipu Village	十里铺村	Shengfeng Township	胜峰乡
Tianjiahu Village	田家湖村	Hucheng Township	护城乡
Wanshen Village	万圣村	Hucheng Township	护城乡
Wuxing Village	五星村	Hucheng Township	护城乡
Xingnan Village	兴南村	Hucheng Township	护城乡
Zhihu Village	治湖村	Hucheng Township	护城乡
Beijie Community	北街社区	Chengguang Town	城关镇
Chengnan Community	环城社区	Chengguang Town	城关镇
Chengxingjie Community	城兴街社区	Chengguang Town	城关镇
Dongjie Community	东街社区	Chengguang Town	城关镇
Guangsha Community	广夏社区	Chengguang Town	城关镇
Huayangjie Community	华阳街社区	Chengguang Town	城关镇
Lijiahu Community	李家湖社区	Chengguang Town	城关镇
Lingyuanjie Community	陵园街社区	Chengguang Town	城关镇
Ma'an Community	马鞍社区	Chengguang Town	城关镇
Malisi Community	麻里泗社区	Hucheng Township	护城乡
Nanjie Community	南街社区	Chengguang Town	城关镇
Qiaodongjie Community	桥东街社区	Chengguang Town	城关镇
Shengfeng Community	胜峰社区	Shengfeng Township	胜峰乡
Shuichanchang Community	水产场社区	Chengguang Town	城关镇
Shuixiangjie Community	水乡街社区	Chengguang Town	城关镇
Xijie Community	西街社区	Chengguang Town	城关镇
Zhangtaijie Community	章台街社区	Chengguang Town	城关镇
Zhuangyuanjie Community	状元街社区	Chengguang Town	城关镇

== Amalgamation of villages in 2016 ==
14 villages reorganized through the amalgamation of villages in 2016
the present name		the amalgamation of villages in 2016			
the present name		former villages		former townships	
English	Chinese	English	Chinese	English	Chinese
Fengxing Village	凤形村	Fengxing Village	凤形村	Shengfeng Township	胜峰乡
Fengxing Village	凤形村	Gangtie Village	钢铁村	Shengfeng Township	胜峰乡
Fengxing Village	凤形村	Paishan Village	排山村	Shengfeng Township	胜峰乡
Hengdi Village	横堤村	Hengdi Village	横堤村	Hucheng Township	护城乡
Hengdi Village	横堤村	Jinhu Village	津湖村	Hucheng Township	护城乡
Hengdi Village	横堤村	Xingou Village	新沟村	Hucheng Township	护城乡
Huagang Village	话岗村	Maojiaxiang; Industrial and Mining Area	毛家巷工矿区	Shengfeng Township	胜峰乡
Huagang Village	话岗村	Chachang (Tea Farm of Shengfeng)	茶场	Shengfeng Township	胜峰乡
Huagang Village	话岗村	Huagang Village	话岗村	Shengfeng Township	胜峰乡
Huagang Village	话岗村	Longxiu Village	龙秀村	Shengfeng Township	胜峰乡
Lishu Village	栗树村	Jinwo Village	金窝村	Shengfeng Township	胜峰乡
Lishu Village	栗树村	Lishu Village	栗树村	Shengfeng Township	胜峰乡
Lishu Village	栗树村	Shaoqi Village	筲箕村	Shengfeng Township	胜峰乡
Lishu Village	栗树村	Shuichanchang (Aquaculture Field of Shengfeng)	水产场	Shengfeng Township	胜峰乡
Lishu Village	栗树村	Yangzhichang (Feedlot Field of Shengfeng)	养殖场	Shengfeng Township	胜峰乡
Pushentang Village	普圣堂村	Baiding Village	白鼎村	Hucheng Township	护城乡
Pushentang Village	普圣堂村	Pushentang Village	普圣堂村	Hucheng Township	护城乡
Qianfeng Village	前锋村	Qianfeng Village	前丰村	Shengfeng Township	胜峰乡
Qianfeng Village	前锋村	Yuejin Village	跃进村	Shengfeng Township	胜峰乡
Qianfeng Village	前锋村	State-owned Forest Farm of Shengfeng	胜峰国营林场	Shengfeng Township	胜峰乡
Sanhe Village	三河村	Sanhe Village	三河村	Hucheng Township	护城乡
Sanhe Village	三河村	Zhujia Village	朱家村	Hucheng Township	护城乡
Shilipu Village	十里铺村	Qingshui Village	清水村	Shengfeng Township	胜峰乡
Shilipu Village	十里铺村	Shilipu Village	十里铺村	Shengfeng Township	胜峰乡
Shifu Village	石伏村	Shifu Village	石伏村	Shengfeng Township	胜峰乡
Shifu Village	石伏村	Zhushantou Village	珠头山村	Shengfeng Township	胜峰乡
Tianjiahu Village	田家湖村	Chengnan Village	城南村	Hucheng Township	护城乡
Tianjiahu Village	田家湖村	Fish Farm of Tianjiahu	田家湖渔场	Hucheng Township	护城乡
Wanshen Village	万圣村	Huaguang Village	华光村	Hucheng Township	护城乡
Wanshen Village	万圣村	Wansheng Village	万圣村	Hucheng Township	护城乡
Wuxing Village	五星村	Lijiaqiao Village	李家桥村	Hucheng Township	护城乡
Wuxing Village	五星村	Wuxing Village	五星村	Hucheng Township	护城乡
Xingnan Village	兴南村	Caixing Village	蔡兴村	Hucheng Township	护城乡
Xingnan Village	兴南村	Xingnan Village	兴南村	Hucheng Township	护城乡
Zhihu Village	治湖村	Yifeng Village	益丰村	Hucheng Township	护城乡
Zhihu Village	治湖村	Zhihu Village	治湖村	Hucheng Township	护城乡
