= Songyuan River =

River in Guangdong, China

Coordinates: 24°30′49″N 116°24′59″E

Songyuan River (Chinese: 松源河; pinyin: Sōngyuánhé) is a river in Guangdong province, China.
