= Daqing =

Prefecture-level city in Heilongjiang, China

Daqing 大庆市
- Prefecture-level city
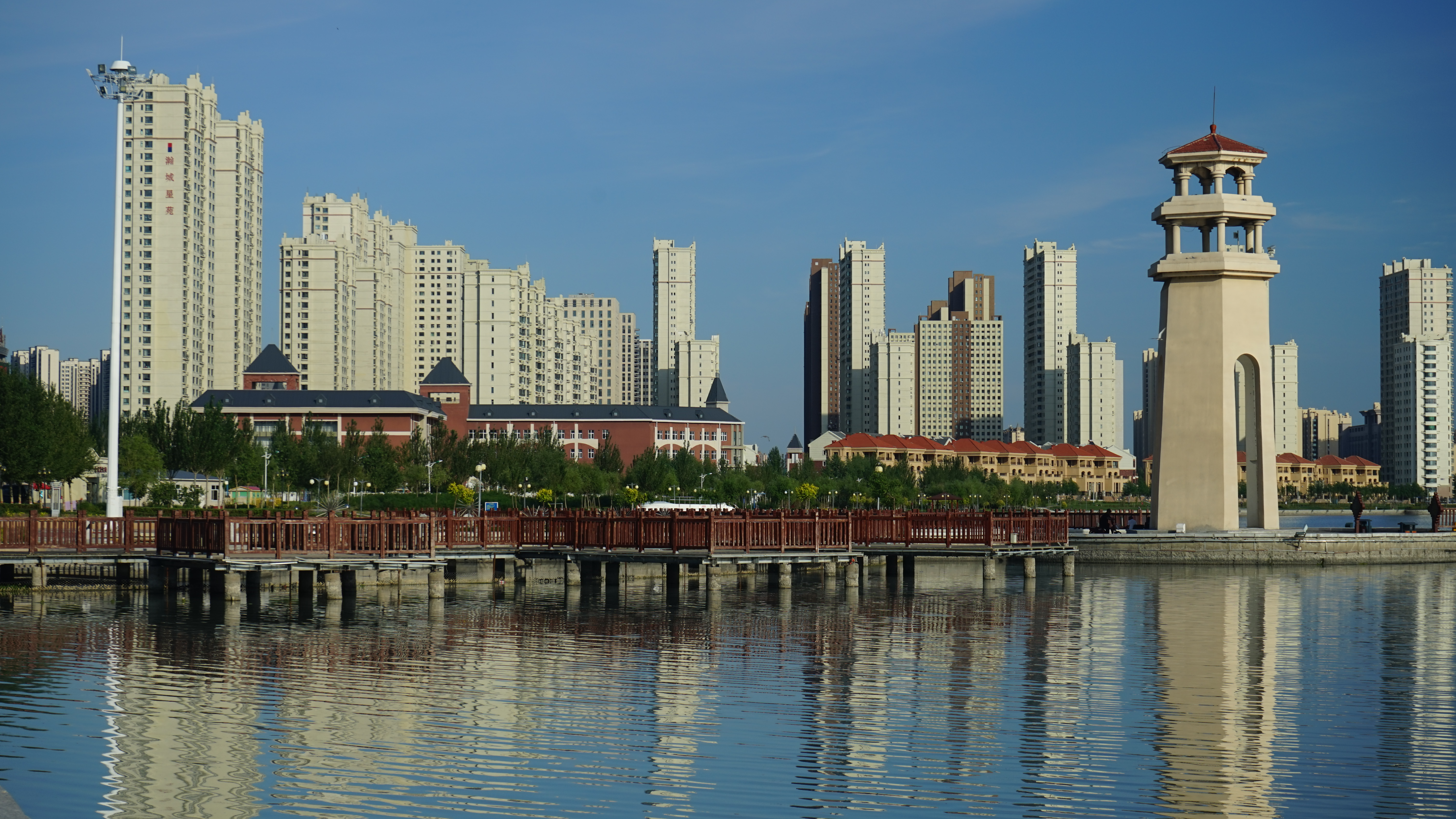
- Around Sanyong Lake, 2017

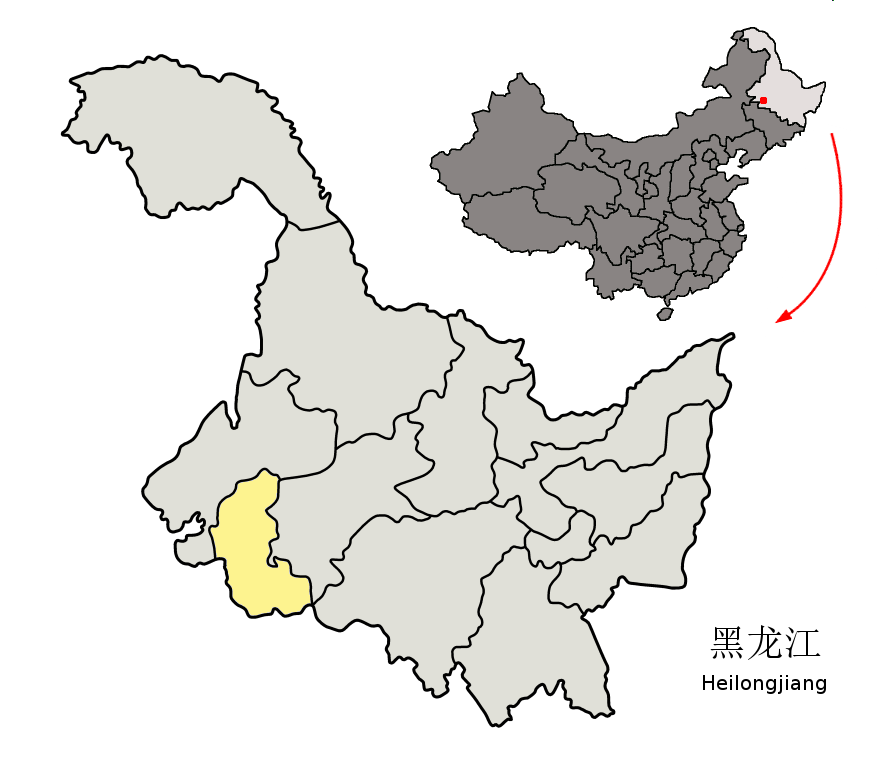
- Location of Daqing City (yellow) in Heilongjiang (light gray) and China

- Location of the city centre in Heilongjiang Daqing (China)
- Coordinates (Daqing municipal government): 46°35′20″N 125°06′14″E
- Country: People's Republic of China
- Province: Heilongjiang
- County-level divisions: 9
- Municipal seat: Sartu District

Government
  - Type: Prefecture-level city
  - CPC Daqing Secretary: Han Lihua (韩立华)
  - Mayor: He Zhonghua (何忠华)

Area
  - Prefecture-level city: 22,161 km^{2} (8,556 sq mi)
  - Urban: 5,107 km^{2} (1,972 sq mi)
  - Metro: 2,734.6 km^{2} (1,055.8 sq mi)
- Elevation: 149 m (489 ft)

Population (2020 census)
  - Prefecture-level city: 2,781,562
  - Density: 125.52/km^{2} (325.09/sq mi)
  - Urban: 1,754,655
  - Urban density: 343.6/km^{2} (889.9/sq mi)
  - Metro: 1,574,389
  - Metro density: 575.73/km^{2} (1,491.1/sq mi)

GDP
  - Prefecture-level city: CN¥ 298.4 billion US$ 47.9 billion
  - Per capita: CN¥ 107,419; US$ 17,247
- Time zone: UTC+8 (China Standard)
- Postal code: 163000
- Area code: 0459
- ISO 3166 code: CN-HL-06
- Licence plates: 黑E
- Climate: Dwa
- Website: www.daqing.gov.cn

Daqing
- "Daqing", as written in Chinese

Chinese name
- Simplified Chinese: 大庆
- Traditional Chinese: 大慶
- Postal: Taching
- Literal meaning: Great Celebration
Transcriptions
Standard Mandarin
- Hanyu Pinyin: Dàqìng
- Wade–Giles: Ta⁴-chʻing⁴

Mongolian name
- Mongolian Cyrillic: Дачин хот
- Mongolian script: ᠳᠠᠴᠢᠩ ᠬᠣᠲᠠ
Transcriptions
- SASM/GNC: dačiŋ ꭓota

Manchu name
- Manchu script: ᡩᠠᡴᡳᠩ ᡥᠣᡨᠣᠨ
- Romanization: Daking hoton

Daqing (simplified Chinese: 大庆; traditional Chinese: 大慶; pinyin: Dàqìng) is a prefecture-level city in the west of Heilongjiang province, People's Republic of China. The name literally means "Great Celebration" and refers to the tenth anniversary of the PRC. Daqing is known as the "Oil Capital of China" and has experienced a phenomenal boom since oil was discovered at the Daqing Oil Field in 1959.

Its population was 2,781,562 as of the 2020 census, of whom 1,574,389 lived in the built-up (or metro) area in four out of the total of five urban districts: Sartu, Longfeng, Ranghulu and Honggang.According to the sample survey of 5‰ population changes in 2024, the resident population of the city at the end of the year was 2.663 million, a decrease of 37,000 compared with the end of the previous year. Among them, the urban population is 1.996 million and the rural population is 667,000.

== History ==
The region now known as Daqing Prefecture was a reasonably insignificant place until the Qing dynasty, known only as an unsettled hunting ground of Dörbet Oirat tribes due to its wetland and prairies. The region began to grow slightly after the Russian Empire constructed the Chinese Eastern Railway (KVZhD) through the area in 1898. The railway has a station at Sartu in today's Sartu District. It was not until 1959 that oil was discovered in the region as part of the large scale oil exploration put into motion across the Northeast China Plain.

The Daqing oilfield was discovered in the late 1950s, and drilling began in 1958. A town with the same name was founded in 1959 to house workers extracting oil and gas from the oilfield and to host industries which could take advantage of the energy and petrochemicals, shortly before the 10th anniversary of the founding of the PRC. The oilfield and the town had the same administrative body until 1983.

The successful construction of the Daqing oil field despite harsh weather conditions and supply limitations became a model held up by the Party as an example during subsequent industrialization campaigns. The project also delivered critical economic benefits because without the production of the Daqing oil field, crude oil would have been severely limited after the Soviet Union cut off supplies as a result of the Sino-Soviet split.

Original plans for Daqing included the development of a "new socialist mining district" (rather than a city) with families in which the husband would work in industry and the wife would work in agriculture. Ultimately, the city expanded incrementally with clusters forming around developing refineries and oil wells. All settlements used a single-story mud technique called scientific gandalei, with multistory brick buildings being introduced in the late 1960s.

The name Daqing literally means "Great Celebration". On 26 May 1960, Anda City was established at former Anda town (today's Anda City in Suihua prefecture), administering Daqing oilfield area. Five months later, the administrative organs of the oilfield relocated in Sartu. On 23 June 1964, the city was established Anda special administrative region, with Anda county administering its surrounding area.

The first two years of the Cultural Revolution resulted in major disruptions to China's petroleum industry and an oil shortage by 1967. In March of that year, the People's Liberation Army was called to Daqing to maintain order so that oil production could proceed. This made Daqing one of the first places brought under military control during the Cultural Revolution. In May 1968, the Daqing Revolutionary Committee was established. Iron Man Wang Jinxi became its vice director. The oil field continued to be a major driver of economic growth during the Cultural Revolution period.

In the mid-1970s, Daqing was administratively organised into three large towns (about 50,000 people each) along the major railway, 60 industrial-agricultural villages (about 10,000 people each), and 164 "residential points" around the villages.

The Daqing Oil District became a city in 1980. Its first master plan set a goal of growing Daqing into "a new industrial city" through a development strategy of "relative dispersion with several modest concentrations. Academic Hou Li summarizes that as a result "new settlements became much more concentrated. The three existing towns, thirty-four central villages, and 260 settlement points were restructured into six workers' towns, twenty-four central villages, and twenty-seven resident villages."

The city revised its master plan in 1989, setting a new goal of building an oil city centered in Saertu, Dongfeng, and Longfeng. This plan shifted Daqing's urban planning focus away from decentralization to centralization.

In 1990, the city received the top recognition in the Heilongjiang Province Science and Technology Awards. In 1994, its population reached one million. After the mid-1990s, urban expansion in Saertu was halted in order to provide more space for oil production. Urban construction was instead transferred to East Town and West Town areas.

Daqing has been advocated as a model of good practice in industry and healthcare by the Chinese government.

=== Learn from Daqing in industry ===
The fact that Mao Zedong promulgated his Supreme Directive, Learn from Daqing in Industry, in the 1960s reflects how important a role Daqing has historically played in industry in China. Learn from Daqing in industry (Chinese: 工业学大庆; pinyin: gōngyè xué dàqìng) was a slogan during the Cultural Revolution telling the people to use the city as an example for industrial production.

Daqing was promoted as a model communist industrial city. Daqing's development had resulted in an integration of rural and urban and community self-sufficiency. Premier Zhou Enlai summarized its achievements with the phrase, "Integration of workers and peasants, integration of urban and rural areas, good for production, and convenient for livelihood." Equality was achieved through distribution of resources, public land management, standardised housing, and communal work. Men worked in the oil fields and received state salaries and pensions. Women and older children worked in agricultural production and supplied food for the community. As mechanisation of agriculture increased over time, small factories were established. Students participated in production, either through agriculture or work-studfy in factories. Services like public canteens, medical clinics, nurseries, and schools were collectively run.

The film Entrepreneurial Pioneers (创业), made in the early 1970s, is a literary rendition of the history of Daqing. During the Mao era, Daqing's agricultural counterpart was Dazhai, a village in the hilly Xiyang county, Shanxi Province, for which Chairman Mao issued the directive In agriculture, learn from Dazhai, also in the 1960s.

== Administrative divisions ==
Daqing is divided into 9 county-level divisions: 5 districts, 3 counties and 1 autonomous county.

Map
Name	Simplified Chinese	Hanyu Pinyin	Population (2010 census)	Area (km^{2})	Density (/km^{2})
Sartu District	萨尔图区	Sà'ěrtú Qū	328,808	549	599
Longfeng District	龙凤区	Lóngfèng Qū	352,404	510	691
Ranghulu District	让胡路区	Rànghúlù Qū	564,534	1,394	405
Datong District	大同区	Dàtóng Qū	234,557	2,235	105
Honggang District	红岗区	Hónggǎng Qū	169,522	812	209
Zhaozhou County	肇州县	Zhàozhōu Xiàn	387,463	2,445	158
Zhaoyuan County	肇源县	Zhàoyuán Xiàn	388,828	4,198	93
Lindian County	林甸县	Líndiàn Xiàn	244,578	3,591	68
Dorbod Mongol Autonomous County	杜尔伯特蒙古族自治县	Dù'ěrbótè Měnggǔzú Zìzhìxiàn	233,838	6,427	36

== Climate ==
Located in the north temperate zone, Daqing has a humid continental climate (Köppen Dwa) and is affected by the Siberian high and the East Asian monsoon. Generally, winter is bitterly cold with occasional snowfalls, and spring and autumn are prevailed by monsoons. The vast majority of the annual rainfall occurs during summer. The diurnal temperature variation can be up to 14 °C (25 °F) during the growing period. The monthly 24-hour average temperature ranges from −18.5 °C (−1.3 °F) in January to 23.3 °C (73.9 °F) in July, and the annual mean is +4.2 °C (39.6 °F). A majority of the annual precipitation falls in July and August alone. With monthly percent possible sunshine ranging from 53% in July to 70% in February, the city receives 2,726 hours of bright sunshine annually. Extreme temperature ranges from −39.2 °C (−38.6 °F) to 39.8 °C (103.6 °F).

Climate data for Daqing, elevation 147 m (482 ft), (1991–2020 normals)
Month	Jan	Feb	Mar	Apr	May	Jun	Jul	Aug	Sep	Oct	Nov	Dec	Year
Mean daily maximum °C (°F)	−11.7 (10.9)	−6.9 (19.6)	2.9 (37.2)	13.5 (56.3)	21.5 (70.7)	26.7 (80.1)	28.5 (83.3)	26.9 (80.4)	21.5 (70.7)	12.3 (54.1)	−0.3 (31.5)	−10.3 (13.5)	10.4 (50.7)
Daily mean °C (°F)	−16.5 (2.3)	−12.2 (10.0)	−2.5 (27.5)	7.8 (46.0)	15.8 (60.4)	21.4 (70.5)	24.0 (75.2)	22.2 (72.0)	16.0 (60.8)	6.9 (44.4)	−4.8 (23.4)	−14.6 (5.7)	5.3 (41.5)
Mean daily minimum °C (°F)	−20.6 (−5.1)	−17.0 (1.4)	−7.5 (18.5)	2.2 (36.0)	10.3 (50.5)	16.4 (61.5)	19.6 (67.3)	17.9 (64.2)	11.1 (52.0)	2.2 (36.0)	−8.6 (16.5)	−18.3 (−0.9)	0.6 (33.2)
Average precipitation mm (inches)	2.4 (0.09)	3.8 (0.15)	8.8 (0.35)	18.9 (0.74)	49.0 (1.93)	100.7 (3.96)	145.8 (5.74)	97.3 (3.83)	50.3 (1.98)	19.1 (0.75)	6.2 (0.24)	5.9 (0.23)	508.2 (19.99)
Average precipitation days (≥ 0.1 mm)	3.6	2.7	4.3	5.7	9.6	13.5	13.1	11.3	7.8	4.8	4.1	5.3	85.8
Average snowy days	5.5	4.9	5.5	2.3	0.1	0	0	0	0	1.1	5.5	8.1	33
Average relative humidity (%)	64	58	51	44	52	64	73	73	65	56	60	66	61
Mean monthly sunshine hours	181.6	194.2	237.5	230.9	235.3	220.9	211.8	211.9	222.6	199.8	158.7	152.4	2,457.6
Percentage possible sunshine	65	66	64	56	51	47	45	49	60	60	57	58	57
Source: China Meteorological Administration

== Demographics ==
Daqing has a population of 2.9 million, mainly Han Chinese, with a small population of 31 minority ethnic groups, including Manchu, Mongolian, Korean, and Hui nationalities. The population density is 112.69/km^{2}, in urban areas 205.07/km^{2}.

== Economy ==
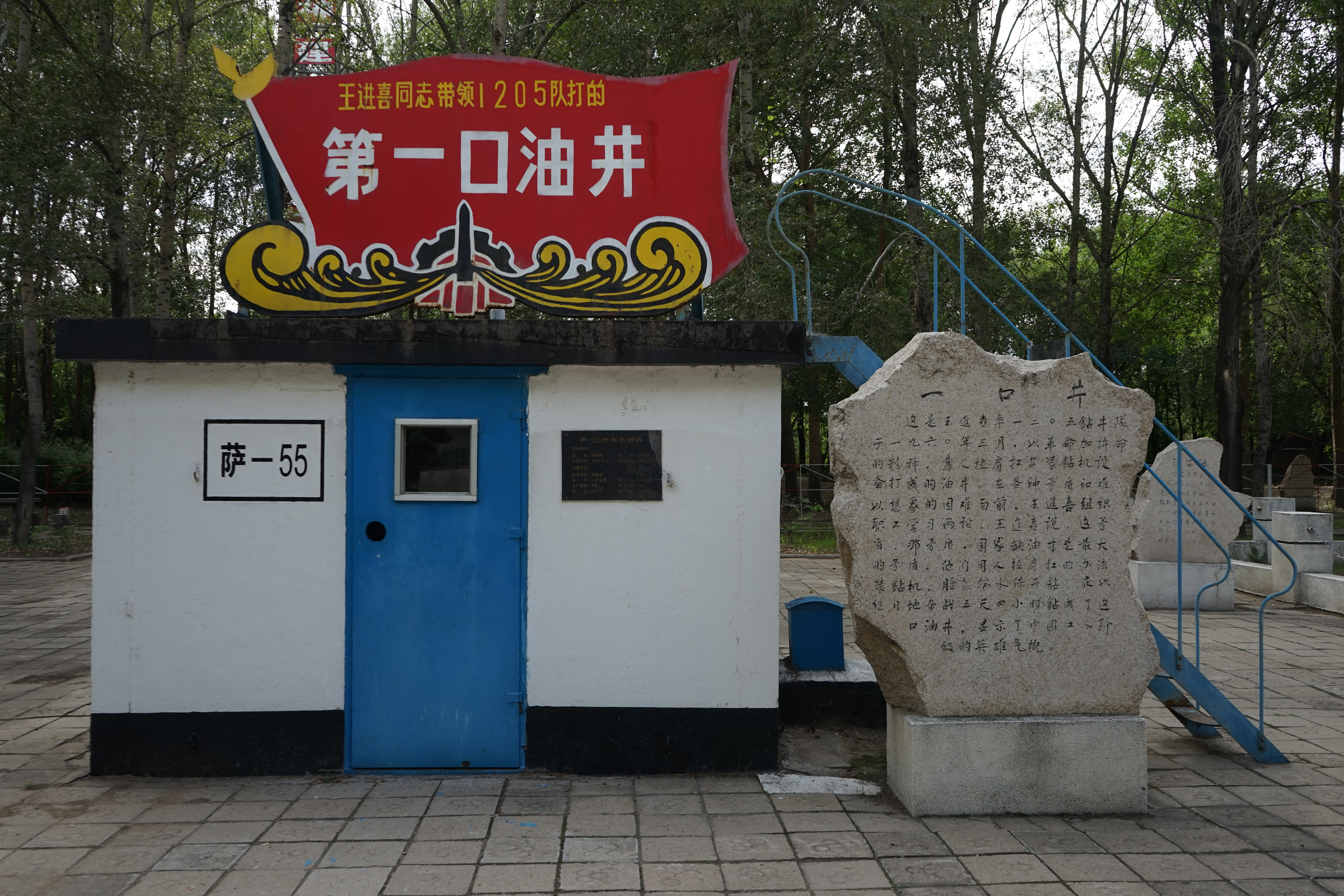
Well Sa-55 first drilled by Wang Jinxi and his colleagues

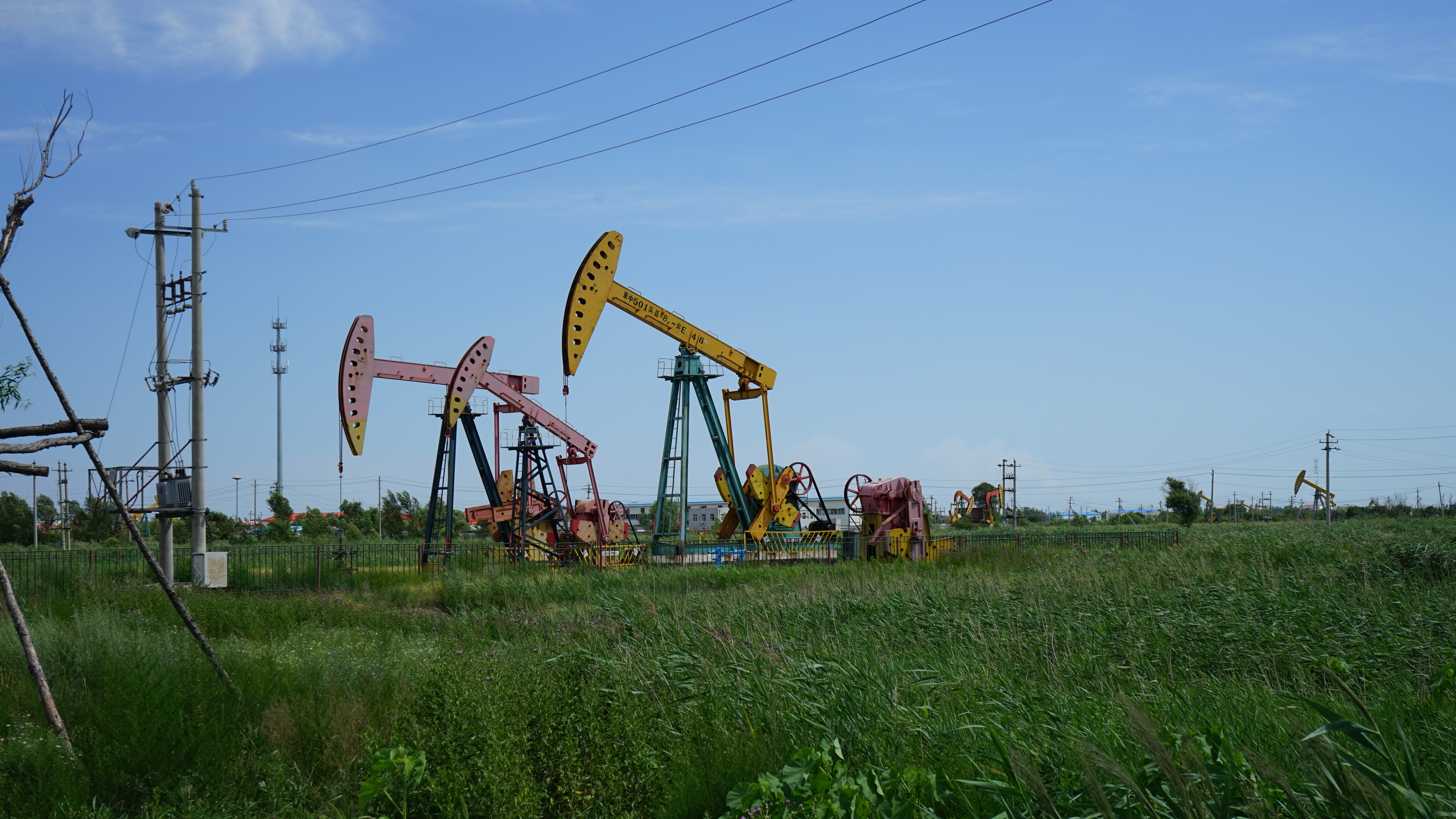
Wildcat in Daqing

Daqing's economy highly depends on petroleum and related industries. Daqing's oilfield is China's largest and the world's fourth most productive. Petroleum accounts for 60.8% of GDP. In 2011, Daqing's gross domestic product (GDP) was RMB374 billion yuan, representing a rise of 12.1% year on year. Primary industries output (including agriculture, forestry, animal husbandry and the fisheries) increased by 13.5% to RMB13.29 billion. Secondary and value-added industries and construction output experienced an increase of 10.1%, reaching RMB307 billion, while the tertiary industry output increased 22.9% to RMB53.74 billion. In 2015 Daqing had a GDP of RMB 298.35 billion.

=== Foreign trade ===
Daqing exports over 10 million tons of crude oil each year. Over 160 varieties of paraffin wax, ethylene, tar oil and benzene are exported to more than 10 nations and regions including the US, the UK, Thailand and Hong Kong.

In 2011, total import and export volume in Daqing reached US$2.16 billion, up by 40.1%. Export volume was US$550 million and import volume was US$1.61 billion. Daqing's main exports include six categories of petrochemical products, construction materials, processed foodstuffs, office furniture and mechanical and electronic equipment.

=== Banking and insurance ===
There were 32 banking institutions in Daqing by the end of 2006; none were foreign-invested banks. In 2011, savings deposits in Renminbi and foreign exchange totaled 170.5 billion RMB. The local finance sector plays an important role in building up Daqing's Century Oilfield and in developing new industries.

The Industrial and Commercial Bank of China, China Agricultural Bank, China Construction Bank, Bank of China, China Communications Bank, the Everbright Bank, Guangdong Development Bank, the Daqing Urban Commercial Bank, Daqing Rural Credit Cooperative Union and the County Urban Credit Cooperative are the major banks serving Daqing.

== Transportation ==
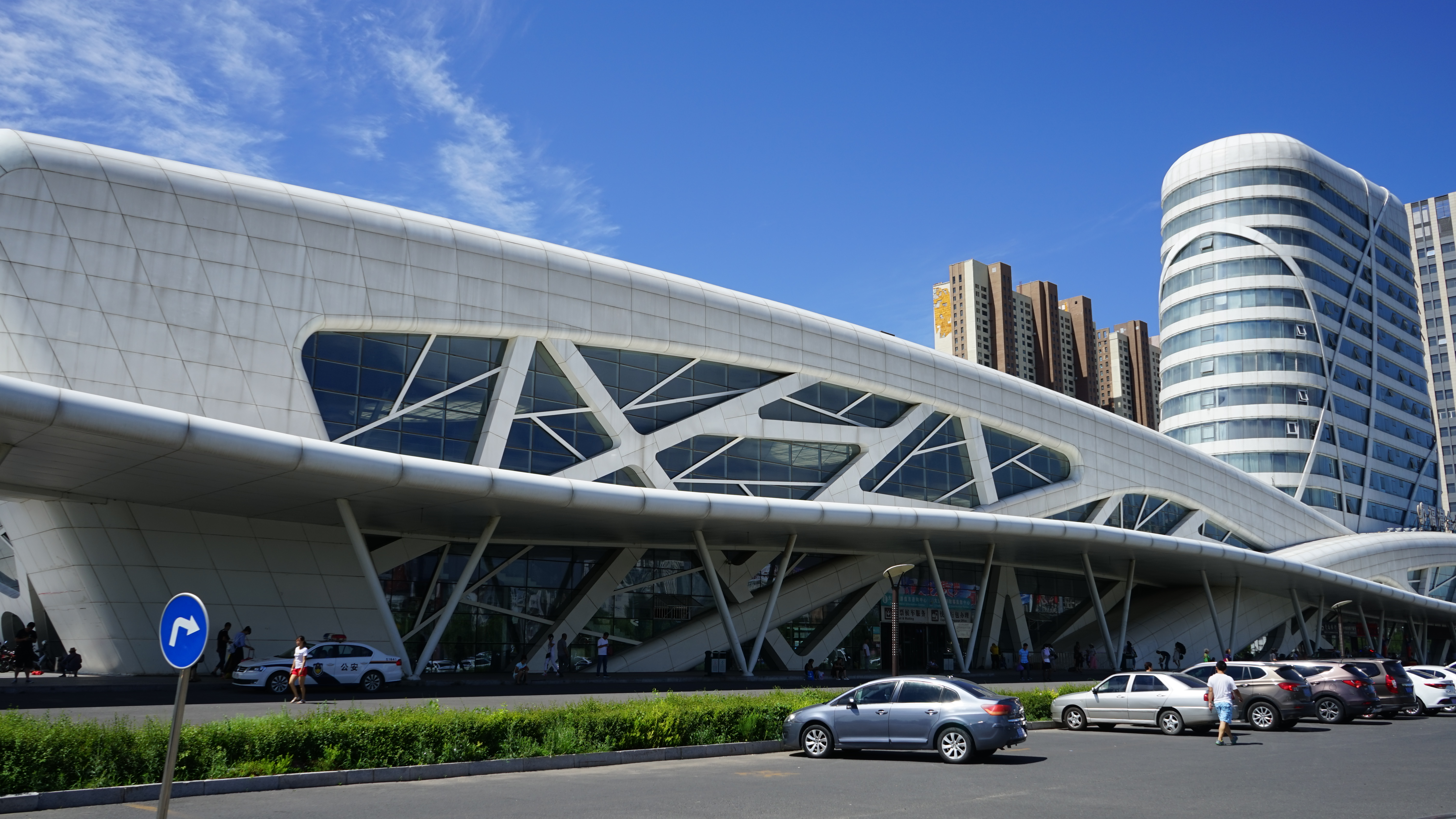
Daqing Passenger Hub

=== Railway ===
Daqing is a major railway hub in western Heilongjiang province and is located on the junction of Harbin-Manzhouli Railway and Tongliao-Ranghulu Railway. Daqing has three major railway stations: Daqing station, Daqing West station (formerly Ranghulu railway station) and Daqing East station. Trains from Daqing connect the city with Beijing, Harbin, Dalian and several other cities in China. The newly built Harbin–Qiqihar Intercity Railway has stops at both Daqing West station and Daqing East station.

=== Airport ===
Daqing Sartu Airport was opened on 1 September 2009. There are flights to several large cities including Beijing, Chengdu, Guangzhou, Hangzhou, Qingdao and Shanghai.

=== Highway ===
Daqing is linked to the national highway network through the G45 Daqing–Guangzhou Expressway and G10 Suifenhe-Manzhouli Expressway.

== Culture ==
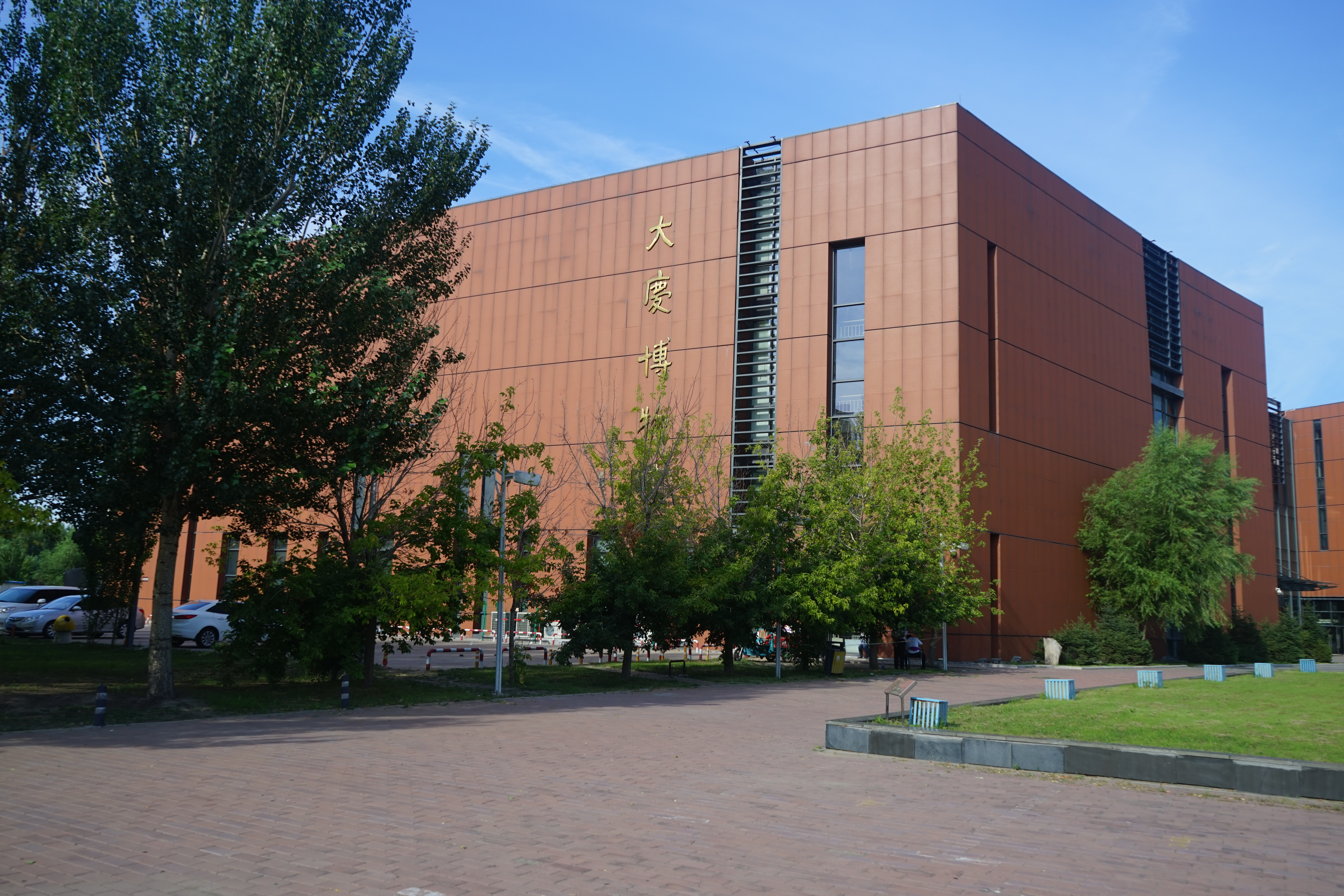
Daqing Museum

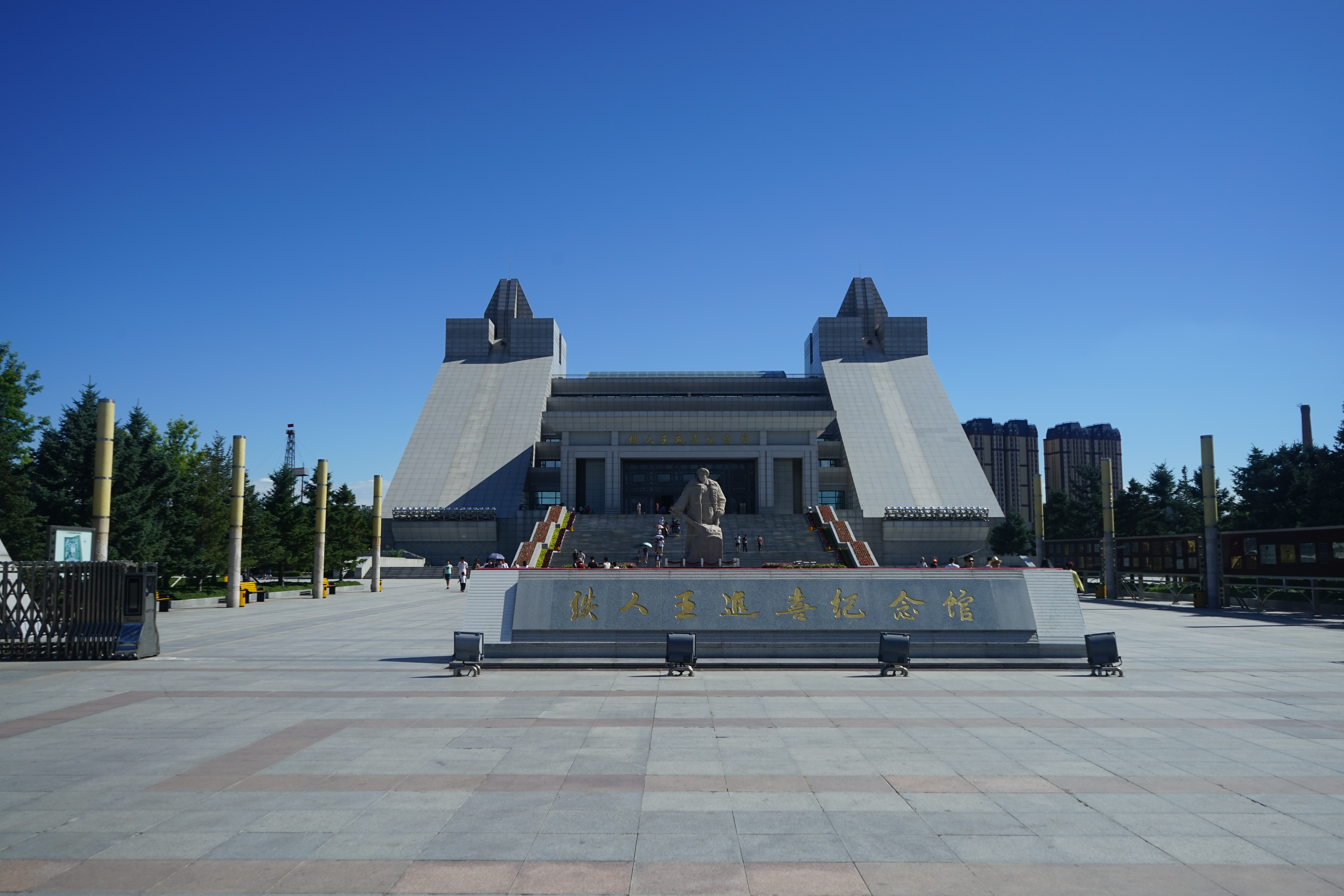
The Iron Man Wang Jinxi Memorial Hall

=== Daqing spirit ===
Generated by the history of the city, Daqing has a culture centering around the "Daqing Spirit, the Daqing People," which is said to represent deep personal commitment in pursuing national goals, self-sufficient and frugal living, and urban-rural integrated land use. Daqing's urban-rural landscape was said to embody the ideal communist society described by Karl Marx because it eliminated (1) the gap between town and country, (2) the gap between workers and peasants, and (3) the gap between manual and mental labor.

"Daqing Spirit, Daqing People" was the title of an April 20, 1964 article in People's Daily which extolled the success of Daqing oil field workers. The most influential of many articles praising Daqing that appeared in state media around that time, "Daqing Spirit, Daqing People" was the first text to compare Daqing to Yan'an, the revolutionary base area where the Communist Party re-grouped following the Long March before going on to win the Chinese Civil War.

Wang Jinxi (Chinese: 王进喜; pinyin: Wáng Jìnxǐ, known as "Iron Man" Wang), a petroleum worker on the Daqing Oilfield who led No. 1205 drilling team, was honored as a national hero due to his contributions to the petroleum industry of China. Daqing was established by the central government as a model for the secondary industry during the 1960s. In order to illuminate the entrepreneurial history of Daqing and its people, several films were made by companies in China.

In 1964, chief director of the Central Experimental Theater Sun Weishi and her husband, the actor Jin Shan, traveled to Daqing to live and work with the oil workers and their families. The next year, the Communist Party journal Red Flag published an article by Sun which praised the Daqing people. After living in Daqing for two years, Sun Weishi returned to Beijing to produce the play The Rising Sun, which was based on the experiences of people in Daqing, particularly Daqing women.

== Sports ==
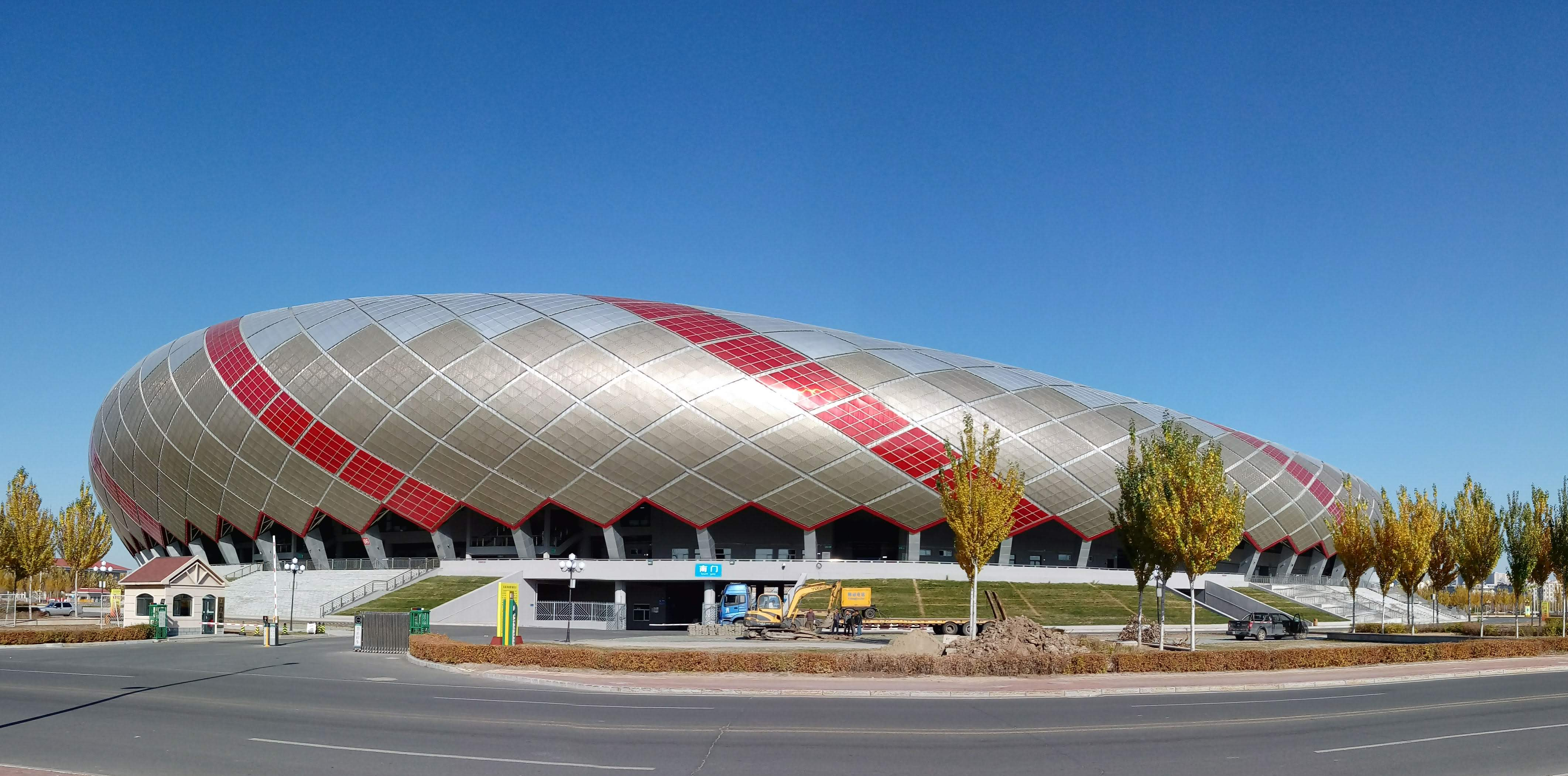
Daqing Olympic Park Stadium

The most popular sport in Daqing is association football. The largest sports venue by capacity is the 32,000-capacity Daqing Olympic Park Stadium. The city also has an indoor speed skating arena.

== Sister Cities ==
=== Domestic ===
- Dongying, Jinan
- Karamay, Xinjiang

=== International ===
- East London, Eastern Cape, South Africa
- Calgary, Alberta, Canada
- Tyumen, Tyumen Oblast, Russia
- Chungju, North Chungcheong, South Korea

== See also ==
- List of twin towns and sister cities in China
