= Scudders Falls (Delaware River) =

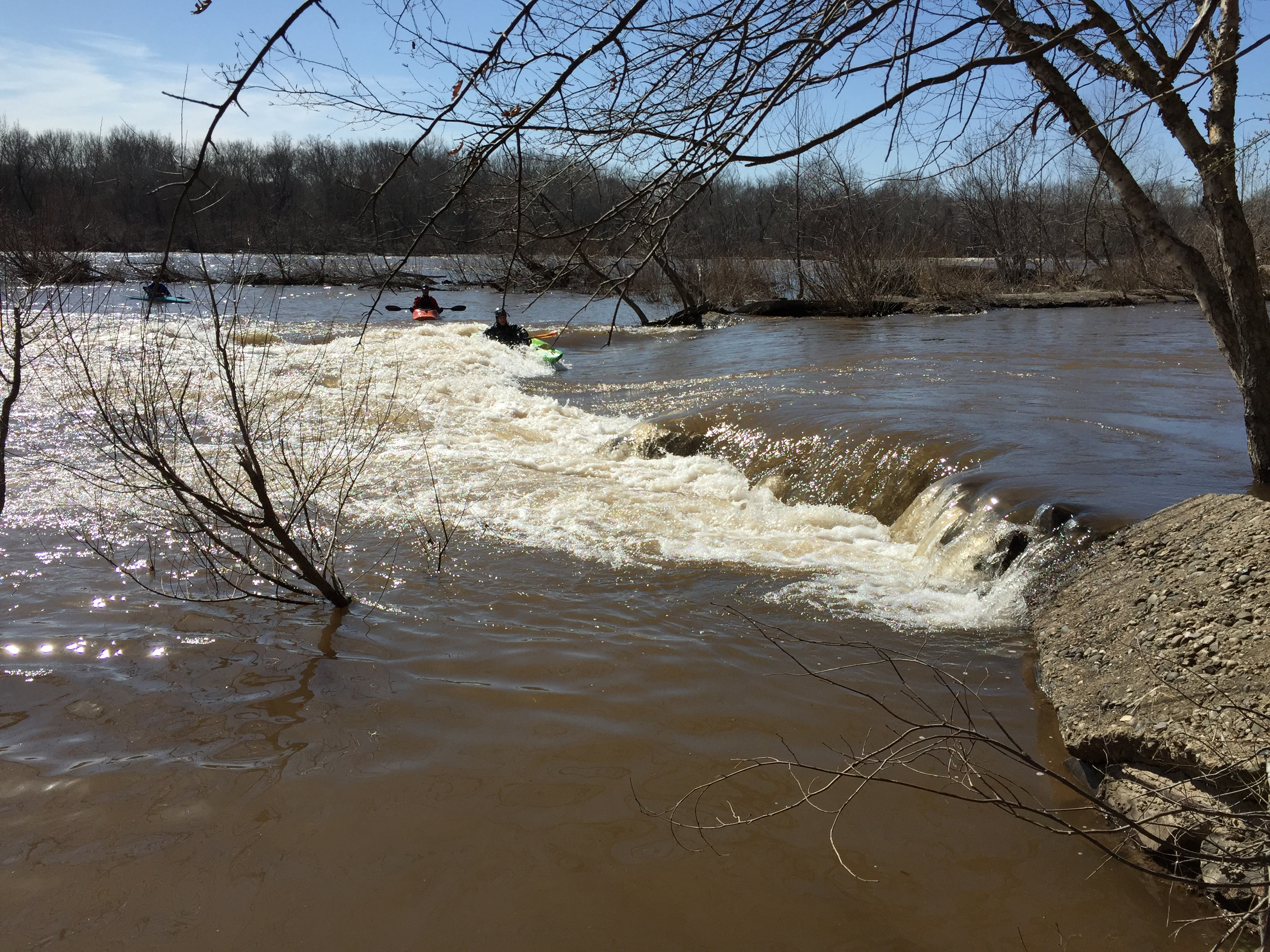
- Kayakers at Scudders Falls
- Interactive map of Scudders Falls
- Location: Ewing, New Jersey and Lower Makefield, Pennsylvania, United States
- Coordinates: 40°16′01″N 74°51′10″W
- Elevation: 23 feet (7.0 m)
- Total height: 10 feet (3.0 m)
- Total width: 600 feet (180 m)
- Watercourse: Delaware River
- Average flow rate: 15,000 cubic feet (420 m^{3})

Scudders Falls is an area of whitewater rapids on the Delaware River between Ewing, New Jersey and Lower Makefield, Pennsylvania in the United States. It is popular with local whitewater enthusiasts.

== History ==
Scudders Falls derives its name from Richard Betts Scudder, who according to the Long Island Genealogy Surname Database, died in 1754 at "Scudder's Falls, Hunterdon County." (This portion of Mercer County was part of Hunterdon County until 1838.) One of Richard Scudder's ancestors from Kent, England was named Henry Skudder. The k in the surname apparently became a c at some point in time, helping to give the falls its name.

The apostrophe was dropped by the United States Board on Geographic Names, which has deleted apostrophes from official geographic place names in all but five instances, hence the current name "Scudders Falls." (Note: Those five instances being Martha's Vineyard, Massachusetts; Carlos Elmer's Joshua View, Arizona; Clark's Mountain, Oregon; Ike's Point, New Jersey; and John E's Pond, Rhode Island.)

The falls lends its name to the Scudder Falls Bridge, located just downstream, and the Scudders Falls section of Ewing, New Jersey.

== Gallery ==
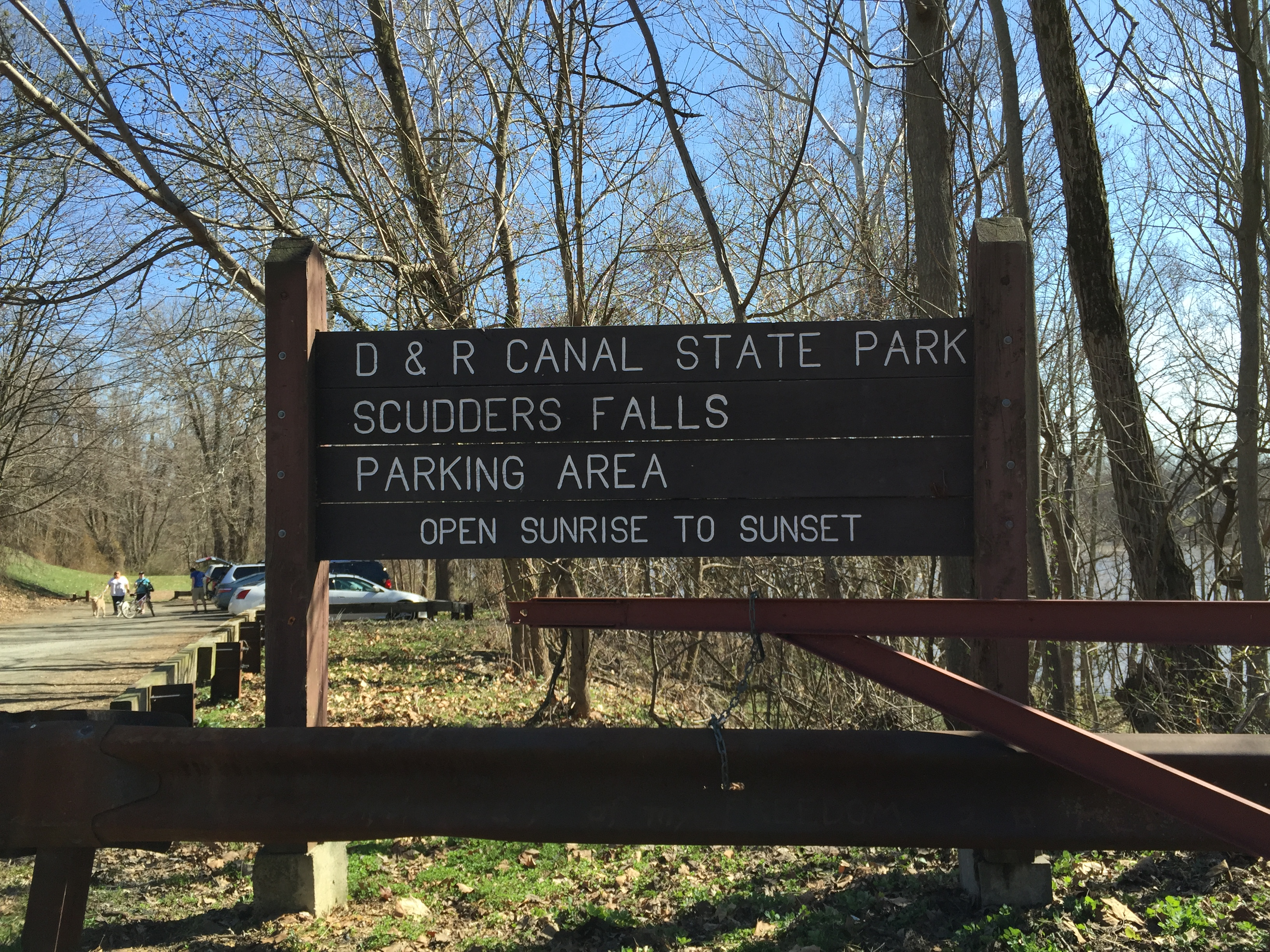
Entrance to Scudders Falls access in Ewing, New Jersey
