= Apostrophe =

Punctuation or diacritical mark (')

’ 'o

Apostrophe
’ ’	' '
Punctuation apostrophe (serif and sans-serif styles)	Typewriter apostrophe (both styles)

The apostrophe (’, ') is a punctuation mark and sometimes a diacritical mark in languages that use the Latin alphabet and some other writing systems. In English, the apostrophe is used for two basic purposes:

- The marking of the omission of one or more letters, e.g., the contraction of "do not" to "don't"
- The marking of possessive case of nouns (as in "the eagle's feathers", "in one month's time", "the twins' coats")

It is also used in a few exceptional cases for the marking of plurals, e.g., "p's and q's" or Oakland A's. The same mark is used as a single quotation mark. It is also substituted informally for other marks – for example instead of the prime symbol to indicate the units of foot or minutes of arc.

The word apostrophe comes from the Greek ἡ ἀπόστροφος [προσῳδία] (hē apóstrophos [prosōidía], '[the accent of] turning away or elision'), through Latin and French.

== Usage in English ==
=== Historical development ===
The apostrophe was first used by Pietro Bembo in his edition of De Aetna (1496). It was introduced into English in the 16th century in imitation of French practice.

==== French practice ====
Introduced by Geoffroy Tory (1529), the apostrophe was used in place of a vowel letter to indicate elision (as in l'heure in place of la heure). It was also frequently used in place of a final ⟨e⟩ (which was still pronounced at the time) when it was elided before a vowel, as in un' heure. Modern French orthography has restored the spelling une heure.

==== Early English practice ====
From the 16th century, following French practice, the apostrophe was used when a vowel letter was omitted either because of incidental elision ("I'm" for "I am") or because the letter no longer represented a sound ("lov'd" for "loved"). English spelling retained many inflections that were not pronounced as syllables, notably verb endings ("-est", "-eth", "-es", "-ed") and the noun ending "-es", which marked either plurals or possessives, also known as genitives. An apostrophe followed by ⟨s⟩ was often used to mark a plural; specifically, the Oxford Companion to the English Language notes:

There was formerly a respectable tradition (17th to 19th centuries) of using the apostrophe for noun plurals, especially in loanwords ending in a vowel (as in ... Comma's are used, Philip Luckcombe, 1771) and in the consonants s, z, ch, sh, (as in waltz's and cotillions, Washington Irving, 1804)...

==== Standardisation ====
The use of elision has continued to the present day, but significant changes have been made to the possessive and plural uses. By the 18th century, an apostrophe with the addition of an ⟨s⟩ was regularly used for all possessive singular forms, even when the letter ⟨e⟩ was not omitted (as in "the gate's height"). This was regarded as representing not the elision of the ⟨e⟩ in the "-e" or "-es" ending of the word being pluralized, but the elision of the ⟨e⟩ from the Old English genitive singular inflection "-es".

The plural genitive did not use the "-es" inflection, and since many plural forms already consisted of the "-s" or "-es" ending, using the apostrophe in place of the elisioned ⟨e⟩ could lead to singular and plural possessives of a given word having the exact same spelling. The solution was to use an apostrophe after the plural ⟨s⟩ (as in "girls' dresses"); however, this was not universally accepted until the mid-19th century. Plurals not ending in -s keep the -'s marker, such as "children's toys, the men's toilet", since there was no risk of ambiguity.

=== Possessive apostrophe ===
The apostrophe is used in English to indicate what is, for historical reasons, misleadingly called the possessive case in the English language. This case was called the genitive until the 18th century and, like the genitive case in other languages, expresses relationships other than possession. For example, in the expressions "the school's headmaster", "the men's department", and "tomorrow's weather", the school does not own/possess the headmaster, men do not own/possess the department, and tomorrow does not/will not own the weather. In the words of Merriam-Webster's Dictionary of English Usage:

The argument is a case of fooling oneself with one's own terminology. After the 18th-century grammarians began to refer to the genitive case as the possessive case, grammarians and other commentators got it into their heads that the only use of the case was to show possession ... Simply changing the name of the genitive does not change or eliminate any of its multiple functions.

That dictionary also cites a study, which found that only 40% of the possessive forms were used to indicate actual possession. The modern spelling convention distinguishes possessive singular forms ("Bernadette's", "flower's", "glass's", "one's") from simple plural forms ("Bernadettes", "flowers", "glasses", "ones"), and both of those from possessive plural forms ("Bernadettes'", "flowers'", "glasses'", "ones'"). For example, the word "glass's" is the singular possessive form of the noun "glass". The plural form of "glass" is "glasses" and the plural possessive form is, therefore, "glasses'". One would therefore say "I drank the glass's contents" to indicate drinking from one glass, but "I drank the glasses' contents" after also drinking from another glass. For singular forms, the modern possessive or genitive inflection is a survival from certain genitive inflections in Old English, for which the apostrophe originally marked the loss of the old ⟨e⟩ (for example, lambes became lamb's). Its use for indicating plural "possessive" forms was not standard before the middle of the 19th century.

==== General principles for the possessive apostrophe ====
===== Summary of rules for most situations =====
- Possessive personal pronouns, serving as either noun-equivalents or adjective-equivalents, do not use an apostrophe, even when they end in ⟨s⟩. The complete list of those ending in the letter ⟨s⟩ or the corresponding sound /s/ or /z/ but not taking an apostrophe is "ours", "yours", "his", "hers", "its", "theirs", and "whose".
- Other pronouns, singular nouns not ending in ⟨s⟩, and plural nouns not ending in ⟨s⟩ all take "'s" in the possessive: e.g., "someone's", "a cat's toys", "women's".
- Plural nouns already ending in ⟨s⟩ take only an apostrophe after the pre-existing ⟨s⟩ to form the possessive: e.g., "three cats' toys".

===== Basic rule (singular nouns) =====
For most singular nouns, the ending "'s" is added; e.g., "the cat's whiskers".

- If a singular noun ends with an ⟨s⟩-sound (spelled with "-s", "-se", for example), practice varies as to whether to add "'s" or the apostrophe alone. In many cases, both spoken and written forms differ between writers.
- Acronyms and initialisms used as nouns (DVD, RADAR, UN, CDC, etc.) follow the same rules as singular nouns: e.g., "the TV's picture quality".

===== Basic rule (plural nouns) =====
When the noun is a normal plural, with an added ⟨s⟩, no extra ⟨s⟩ is added in the possessive, and it is pronounced accordingly; so "the neighbours' garden" (there is more than one neighbour owning the garden) is standard rather than "the neighbours's garden".

- If the plural is not one that is formed by adding ⟨s⟩, an ⟨s⟩ is added for the possessive, after the apostrophe: "children's hats", "women's hairdresser", "some people's eyes" (but compare "some peoples' recent emergence into nationhood", where "peoples" is meant as the plural of the singular "people"). These principles are universally accepted.
- A few English nouns have plurals that are not spelled with a final ⟨s⟩ but nevertheless end in an /s/ or a /z/ sound: "mice" (plural of "mouse"; also in compounds like "dormouse", "titmouse"), "dice" (when used as the plural of "die"), "pence" (a plural of "penny", with compounds like "sixpence" that now tend to be taken as singulars). In the absence of specific exceptional treatment in style guides, the possessives of these plurals are formed by adding an apostrophe and an ⟨s⟩ in the standard way: "seven titmice's tails were found", "the dice's last fall was a seven", "his few pence's value was not enough to buy bread". These would often be rephrased, where possible: "the last fall of the dice was a seven". (Note: "Pease" as an old plural of "pea" is indeterminate: Lentils' and pease'[s] use in such dishes was optional. Nouns borrowed from French ending in -eau, -eu, -au, or -ou sometimes have alternative plurals that retain the French -x plural indicator: beaux or beaus; bureaux or bureaus; adieux or adieus; fabliaux or fabliaus; choux or chous. The ⟨x⟩ in these plurals is often pronounced. If it is, then (in the absence of specific rulings from style guides) the plural possessives are formed with an apostrophe alone: the beaux' [or beaus'] appearance at the ball; the bureaux' [or bureaus'] responses differed. If the ⟨x⟩ is not pronounced, then in the absence of special rulings the plurals are formed with an apostrophe followed by an ⟨s⟩: the beaux's appearance; the bureaux's responses; their adieux's effect was that everyone wept. See also Nouns ending with silent ⟨s⟩, ⟨x⟩ or ⟨z⟩, below, and attached notes.)

===== Basic rule (compound nouns) =====
Compound nouns have their singular possessives formed with an apostrophe and an added ⟨s⟩, in accordance with the given rules: the Attorney-General's husband; the Lord Warden of the Cinque Ports's prerogative; this Minister for Justice's intervention; her father-in-law's new wife.

- In such examples, the plurals are formed with an ⟨s⟩ that does not occur at the end: e.g., attorneys-general. A problem therefore arises with the possessive plurals of these compounds. Sources that rule on the matter appear to favour the following forms, in which there is both an ⟨s⟩ added to form the plural, and a separate ⟨'s⟩ added for the possessive: the attorneys-general's husbands; successive Ministers for Justice's interventions; their fathers-in-law's new wives. Because these constructions stretch the resources of punctuation beyond comfort, in practice they are normally reworded: interventions by successive Ministers for Justice.

===== Joint or separate possession =====
For two nouns (or noun phrases) joined by and, there are several ways of expressing possession, including:

1. marking of the last noun (e.g. "Jack and Jill's children")
2. marking of both nouns (e.g. "Jack's and Jill's children").

Some grammars make no distinction in meaning between the two forms. (Note: For instance: The Cambridge Grammar of the English Language, explicitly states; "Types I [Jack and Jill's] and II [Jack's and Jill's] are not semantically contrastive. Both allow either a joint or distributive interpretation of the genitive relation.": A Comprehensive Grammar of the English Language explicitly states; "A coordination of genitives such as John's and Mary's children may be interpreted in either a combinatory or a segregatory fashion: combinatory meaning: 'the children who are joint offspring of John and Mary' segregatory meaning: 'John's child and Mary's child' or 'John's children and Mary's child' or 'John's child and Mary's children' or 'John's children and Mary's children' ") Some publishers' style guides make a distinction, assigning the "segregatory" (or "distributive") meaning to the form "John's and Mary's" and the "combinatorial" (or "joint") meaning to the form "John and Mary's". (Note: For instance: The Chicago Manual of Style (16th ed.) states: "Closely linked nouns are considered a single unit in forming the possessive when the thing being 'possessed' is the same for both; only the second element takes the possessive form. my aunt and uncle's house ... When the things possessed are discrete, both nouns take the possessive form. my aunt's and uncle's medical profiles ...": New Hart's Rules states: "Use 's after the last of a set of linked nouns where the nouns are acting together ... but repeat 's after each noun in a set where the nouns are acting separately": Garner's Modern American Usage states; "For joint possession, an apostrophe goes with the last element in a series of names. If you put an apostrophe with each element in the series, you signal individual possession.") A third alternative is a construction of the form "Jack's children and Jill's", which is always distributive, i.e. it designates the combined set of Jack's children and Jill's children.

When a coordinate possessive construction has two personal pronouns, the normal possessive inflection is used, and there is no apostrophe (e.g., "his and her children"). The issue of the use of the apostrophe arises when the coordinate construction includes a noun (phrase) and a pronoun. In this case, the inflection of only the last item may sometimes be, at least marginally, acceptable ("you and your spouse's bank account"). The inflection of both is normally preferred (e.g. Jack's and your dogs), but there is a tendency to avoid this construction, too, in favour of a construction that does not use a coordinate possessive (e.g. by using "Jack's letters and yours"). Where a construction like "Jack's and your dogs" is used, the interpretation is usually "segregatory" (i.e. not joint possession).

===== With other punctuation; compounds with pronouns =====
If the word or compound includes, or ends with, a punctuation mark, an apostrophe and an ⟨s⟩ are still added in the usual way: "Westward Ho!'s railway station"; "Awaye!'s Paulette Whitten recorded Bob Wilson's story"; Washington, D.C.'s museums. (assuming that the prevailing style requires full stops in D.C.).

- If the word or compound already includes a possessive apostrophe, a double possessive results: Tom's sisters' careers; the head of marketing's husband's preference; the master of foxhounds' best dog's death. Many style guides, while allowing that these constructions are possible, advise rephrasing: the head of marketing's husband prefers that .... If an original apostrophe or apostrophe with ⟨s⟩occurs at the end, it is left by itself to serve both purposes: Our employees are better paid than McDonald's employees; Standard & Poor's indices are widely used: the fixed forms of McDonald's and Standard & Poor's already include possessive apostrophes. For similar cases involving geographical names, see below.
- Similarly, the possessives of all phrases whose wording is fixed are formed in the same way:
  - "Us and Them"'s inclusion on the album The Dark Side of the Moon
  - You Am I's latest CD
  - The 69'ers' drummer, Tom Callaghan (only the second apostrophe is possessive)
  - His 'n' Hers's first track is called "Joyriders". (Note: This is standard even though the possessive word hers is usually spelled without an apostrophe.)
  - Was She's success greater, or King Solomon's Mines's? (Note: Most sources are against continuing the italics used in such titles to the apostrophe and the ⟨s⟩.)

For complications with foreign phrases and titles, see below.

===== Time, money, and similar =====
An apostrophe is used in time and money references in constructions such as one hour's respite, two weeks' holiday, a dollar's worth, five pounds' worth, one mile's drive from here. This is like an ordinary genitive use. For example, one hour's respite means a respite of one hour (like the cat's whiskers has the same meaning as the whiskers of the cat).

===== Possessive pronouns and adjectives =====
No apostrophe is used in the following possessive pronouns and adjectives: hers, his, its, my, mine, ours, theirs, whose, and yours. All other possessive pronouns do end with an apostrophe and an ⟨s⟩. In singular forms, the apostrophe comes first, e.g. one's; everyone's; somebody's, nobody else's, etc., while the apostrophe follows the ⟨s⟩ in plural forms as with nouns: the others' complaints. The possessive of it was originally it's, in contrast to the modern its. The apostrophe was dropped by the early 19th century. Authorities are now unanimous that it's can be only a contraction of it is or it has. (Note: See for example New Hart's Rules. Not one of the other sources listed on this page supports the use of it's as a possessive form of it.) Despite this, using it's as a possessive pronoun is a common grammatical error in present times.

===== Importance for disambiguation =====
Each of these four phrases (listed in Steven Pinker's The Language Instinct) has a distinct meaning:

- My sister's friend's investment (the investment belonging to a friend of my sister)
- My sister's friends' investment (the investment belonging to several friends of my sister)
- My sisters' friend's investment (the investment belonging to a friend of several of my sisters)
- My sisters' friends' investment (the investment belonging to several friends of several of my sisters)

Kingsley Amis, on being challenged to produce a sentence whose meaning depended on a possessive apostrophe, came up with:

- Those things over there are my husband's. (Those things over there belong to my husband.)
- Those things over there are my husbands'. (Those things over there belong to several husbands of mine.)
- Those things over there are my husbands. (I'm married to those men over there.)

==== Singular nouns ending with an ⟨s⟩ or ⟨z⟩ sound ====
Some singular nouns are pronounced with a sibilant sound at the end: /s/ or /z/. The spelling of these ends with -s, -se, -z, -ze, -ce, -x, or -xe. Most respected authorities recommend that practically all singular nouns, including those ending with a sibilant sound, have possessive forms with an extra ⟨s⟩ after the apostrophe so that the spelling reflects the underlying pronunciation. Examples include Oxford University Press, the Modern Language Association, the BBC and The Economist. Such authorities demand possessive singulars like these: Bridget Jones's Diary; Tony Adams's friend; my boss's job; the US's economy. Rules that modify or extend the standard principle have included the following:

- If the singular possessive is difficult or awkward to pronounce with an added sibilant, do not add an extra ⟨s⟩; these exceptions are supported by the Yahoo! Style Guide, and The American Heritage Book of English Usage. Such sources permit possessive singulars like these: Socrates' later suggestion; or Achilles' heel if that is how the pronunciation is intended. The style guides of The Economist and The Guardian omit the extra s in this case.
- Some style guides advise that Classical, biblical, and similar names ending in a sibilant, especially if they are polysyllabic, should not take an added ⟨s⟩ in the possessive; among sources giving exceptions of this kind are The Times and The Elements of Style, which make general stipulations, and Vanderbilt University, which mentions only Moses and Jesus. As a particular case, Jesus' – referred to as "an accepted liturgical archaism" in Hart's Rules – is commonly written instead of Jesus's.
- There are also some entrenched uses, for example St James's Park (in London); however, the Newcastle stadium displays its name spelled St James' Park), St James's Palace, and the Court of St James's, St. James's Hospital (in Dublin), King James's School, Knaresborough and King James's School, Almondbury, but there is no genitive at all in St James Park (Exeter) or St. James Park (Bronx); nor is there one in the King James Bible since, like the Hebrew Bible, it is a description and not a possessive.

Although less common, some contemporary writers still follow the older practice of omitting the second 's in some cases ending with a sibilant, but usually not when written -x or -xe. The Associated Press Stylebook recommends or allows the practice of omitting the additional ⟨s⟩ in proper nouns ending with an ⟨s⟩, but not in words ending with other sibilants (⟨z⟩ and ⟨x⟩). The Chicago Manual of Style, in its 15th edition, recommended the traditional practice, which included providing for several exceptions to accommodate spoken usage such as the omission of the extra ⟨s⟩ after a polysyllabic word ending in a sibilant, but as of the 16th edition no longer recommends omitting the possessive ⟨s⟩.

Similar examples of notable names ending in an ⟨s⟩ that are often given a possessive apostrophe with no additional ⟨s⟩ include Dickens and Williams. There is often a policy of leaving off the additional ⟨s⟩ on any such name, but this can prove problematic when specific names are contradictory (for example, St James' Park in Newcastle [the football ground] and the area of St James's Park in London); however, debate has been going on regarding the punctuation of St James' Park (Newcastle) for some time, unlike St James's Park (London) which is the less contentious version.

Some writers like to reflect standard spoken practice in cases like these with sake: for convenience' sake, for goodness' sake, for appearance' sake, for compromise' sake, etc. This punctuation is preferred in major style guides. Others prefer to add 's: for convenience's sake. Still others prefer to omit the apostrophe when there is an ⟨s⟩ sound before sake: for morality's sake, but for convenience sake.

==== Nouns ending with silent ⟨s⟩, ⟨x⟩, or ⟨z⟩ ====
The English possessive of French nouns ending in a silent ⟨s⟩, ⟨x⟩, or ⟨z⟩ is addressed by various style guides. Certainly a sibilant is pronounced in examples like Descartes's and Dumas's; the question addressed here is whether ⟨s⟩ needs to be added. Similar examples with ⟨x⟩ or ⟨z⟩: Sauce Périgueux's main ingredient is truffle; His pince-nez's loss went unnoticed; "Verreaux('s) eagle, a large, predominantly black eagle, Aquila verreauxi,..." (OED, entry for "Verreaux", with silent ⟨x⟩; see Verreaux's eagle); in each of these some writers might omit the added ⟨s⟩. The same principles and residual uncertainties apply with "naturalised" English words, like Illinois and Arkansas.

For possessive plurals of words ending in a silent ⟨x⟩, ⟨z⟩ or ⟨s⟩, the few authorities that address the issue at all typically call for an added ⟨s⟩ and suggest that the apostrophe precede the ⟨s⟩: The Loucheux's homeland is in the Yukon; Compare the two Dumas's literary achievements. (Note: An apparent exception is The Complete Stylist, Sheridan Baker, 2nd edition 1972, p. 165: "... citizens' rights, the Joneses' possessions, and similarly The Beaux' Stratagem." But in fact the x in beaux, as in other such plurals in English, is often already pronounced; The Beaux Stratagem, the title of a play by George Farquhar (1707), originally lacked the apostrophe (see the title page of a 1752 edition); and it is complicated by the following ⟨s⟩ in stratagem. Some modern editions add the apostrophe (some with an ⟨s⟩ also), some omit it; and some make a compound with a hyphen: The Beaux-Stratagem. Farquhar himself used the apostrophe elsewhere in the standard ways, for both omission and possession.) The possessive of a cited French title with a silent plural ending is uncertain: "Trois femmes's long and complicated publication history", but "Les noces' singular effect was 'exotic primitive' ..." (with nearby sibilants -ce- in noces and s- in singular). Guides typically seek a principle that will yield uniformity, even for foreign words that fit awkwardly with standard English punctuation.

==== Possessives in geographic names ====
Place names in the United States do not use the possessive apostrophe on federal maps and signs. The United States Board on Geographic Names, which has responsibility for formal naming of municipalities and geographic features, has deprecated the use of possessive apostrophes since 1890 so as not to show ownership of the place. Only five names of natural features in the US are officially spelled with a genitive apostrophe: Martha's Vineyard; Ike's Point, New Jersey; John E's Pond, Rhode Island; Carlos Elmer's Joshua View, Arizona; and Clark's Mountain, Oregon. Some municipalities, originally incorporated using the apostrophe, have dropped it in accordance with this policy; Taylors Falls in Minnesota, for example, was originally incorporated as "Taylor's Falls". On the state level, the federal policy is not always followed: Vermont's official state website has a page on Camel's Hump State Forest.

Australia's Intergovernmental Committee on Surveying and Mapping also has a no-apostrophe policy, a practice it says goes back to the 1900s and which is generally followed around the country. On the other hand, the United Kingdom has Bishop's Stortford, Bishop's Castle and King's Lynn (among many others) but St Albans, St Andrews and St Helens. London Underground's Piccadilly line has the adjacent stations of Earl's Court in Earl's Court and Barons Court. These names were mainly fixed in form many years before grammatical rules were fully standardised. While Newcastle United play football at a stadium called St James' Park, and Exeter City at St James Park, London has a St James's Park (this whole area of London is named after the parish of St James's Church, Piccadilly). Modern usage has been influenced by considerations of technological convenience including the economy of typewriter ribbons and films, and similar computer character "disallowance" which tend to ignore past standards. Practice in the United Kingdom and Canada is not so uniform.

==== Possessives in names of organizations ====
Sometimes the apostrophe is omitted in the names of clubs, societies, and other organizations, even though the standard principles seem to require it: Country Women's Association, but International Aviation Womens Association; Magistrates' Court of Victoria, but Federated Ship Painters and Dockers Union. Usage is variable and inconsistent. Style guides typically advise consulting an official source for the standard form of the name (as one would do if uncertain about other aspects of the spelling of the name); some tend towards greater prescriptiveness, for or against such an apostrophe. (Note: Gregg Reference Manual, 10th edition, 2003, distinguishes between what it calls possessive and descriptive forms, and uses this distinction in analyzing the problem. From paragraph 628: "a. Do not mistake a descriptive form ending in ⟨s⟩ for a possessive form[:] sales effort (sales describes the kind of effort)... b. Some cases can be difficult to distinguish. Is it the girls basketball team or the girls' basketball team? Try substituting an irregular plural like women. You would not say the women basketball team; you would say the women's basketball team. By analogy, the girls' basketball team is correct" [italics given exactly as in original, including following punctuation]. In this case, the phrase in question is not part of the name and the words are not capitalised, and then this principle is applied to organizations at paragraph 640, where examples are given, including the non-conforming Childrens Hospital, (in Los Angeles): "The names of many organizations, products, and publications contain words that could be considered either possessive or descriptive terms... c. In all cases follow the organization's preference when known.") As the case of womens shows, it is not possible to analyze these forms simply as non-possessive plurals, since women is the only correct plural form of woman.

==== Possessives in business names ====
Where a business name is based on a family name it should in theory take an apostrophe, but many leave it out (contrast Sainsbury's with Harrods). In recent times there has been an increasing tendency to drop the apostrophe. Names based on a first name are more likely to take an apostrophe, but this is not always the case. Some business names may inadvertently spell a different name if the name with an ⟨s⟩ at the end is also a name, such as Parson. A small activist group called the Apostrophe Protection Society, with "the specific aim of preserving the correct use of this currently much abused punctuation mark" across the English-speaking world, has campaigned for large retailers such as Harrods, Currys, and Selfridges to reinstate their missing punctuation. A spokesperson for Barclays PLC stated, "It has just disappeared over the years. Barclays is no longer associated with the family name." Further confusion can be caused by businesses whose names look as if they should be pronounced differently without an apostrophe, such as Paulos Circus, and other companies that leave the apostrophe out of their logos but include it in written text, such as Cadwalader's.

=== Apostrophe showing omission ===
An apostrophe is commonly used to indicate omitted characters, normally letters:

- It is used in contractions, such as can't from cannot, it's from it is or it has, and I'll from I will or I shall.
- It is used in abbreviations, as gov't for government. It may indicate omitted numbers where the spoken form is also capable of omissions, as '70s for 1970s representing seventies for nineteen-seventies. In modern usage, apostrophes are generally omitted when letters are removed from the start of a word, particularly for a compound word. For example, it is not common to write 'bus (for omnibus), 'phone (telephone), 'net (Internet); however, if the shortening is unusual, dialectal or archaic, the apostrophe may still be used to mark it (e.g., 'bout for about, 'less for unless, 'twas for it was). Sometimes a misunderstanding of the original form of a word results in a non-standard contraction. A common example: 'til for until, although till is in fact the original form, and until is derived from it.
  - The spelling fo'c's'le, contracted from the nautical term forecastle, is unusual for having three apostrophes. The spelling bo's'n's (from boatswain's), as in Bo's'n's Mate, also has three apostrophes, two showing omission and one possession. Fo'c's'le may also take a possessive s – as in the fo'c's'le's timbers – giving four apostrophes in one word. A word which formerly contained two apostrophes is sha'n't for shall not, examples of which may be found in the older works of P. G. Wodehouse and "Frank Richards" (Charles Hamilton), but this has been superseded by shan't.
  - Shortenings with more apostrophes, such as y'all'dn't've (y'all wouldn't have), are possible, particularly in Southern US dialects.
- It is sometimes used when the normal form of an inflection seems awkward or unnatural; for example, KO'd rather than KOed (where KO is used as a verb meaning "to knock out"); "a spare pince-nez'd man" (cited in OED, entry for "pince-nez"; pince-nezed is also in citations).
- An apostrophe's function as possessive or contractive can depend on the grammatical context:
  - We rehearsed for Friday's opening night. (We rehearsed for the opening night on Friday.)
  - We rehearsed because Friday's opening night. (We rehearsed because Friday is opening night. "Friday's" here is a contraction of "Friday is".)
- Eye dialects use apostrophes in creating the effect of a non-standard pronunciation.
- Apostrophes to omit letters in place names are common on British road signs when space does not allow for the full name – for example, Wolverhampton abbreviated as "W'hampton" and Kidderminster as "K'minster".
- The United States Board on Geographic Names, while discouraging possessive apostrophes in place names, allows apostrophes indicating omission, as in "Lake O' the Woods", or when normally present in a surname, as in "O'Malley Draw".

=== Use in forming some plurals ===
An apostrophe can be used in the plural form of a single letter, as seen in the team logo of the Oakland A's.

Following an evolution in usage in the 20th century, today "the apostrophe of plurality continues in at least five areas": abbreviations, letters of the alphabet/small words, numbers, family names, and in non-standard use.

==== Abbreviations ====
To pluralize abbreviations, including acronyms, the use of s without an apostrophe is now more common than its use with an apostrophe. Most modern style guides disparage the use of apostrophes in all plural abbreviations. Some references continue to condone their use, or even recommend their use in some abbreviations. For example, The Canadian Style states "Add an apostrophe and s to form the plural of abbreviations containing more than one period", so G.M.'s is preferred to G.M.s. The Oxford Companion to the English Language condones V.I.P.'s, VIP's, and VIPs equally.

==== Letters of the alphabet, and small words ====
For single lowercase letters, pluralization with 's is usual. Many guides recommend apostrophes whether the single letters are lowercase (as in "minding your p's and q's") or uppercase (as in "A's and S's"). The Chicago Manual of Style recommends the apostrophe of plurality only for lowercase letters. Sometimes, adding just s rather than 's may leave meaning ambiguous or presentation inelegant; however, an apostrophe is not always the preferred solution. APA style requires the use of italics instead of an apostrophe: ps, ns, etc. In the phrase dos and don'ts, most modern style guides disparage spelling the first word as do's; however, there is a lack of consensus and certainly the use of an apostrophe continues, legitimately, in which "the apostrophe of plurality occurs in the first word but not the second".

==== Numbers and symbols ====
The Oxford Companion to the English Language notes that "a plural s after a set of numbers is often preceded by an apostrophe, as in 3's and 4's..., but many housestyles and individuals now favour 3s and 4s". Most style guides prefer the lack of apostrophe for groups of years (e.g. 1980s) and will prefer 90s or '90s over 90's or '90's. While many guides discourage using an apostrophe in all numbers/dates, many other guides encourage using an apostrophe for numbers or are divided on the issue; for example, the Australian Government Style Manual recommends "Binary code uses 0's and 1's" but recommends "the 2020s". Still other guides take a laissez-faire approach. For example, the University of Sussex's online guide notes regional variation in the use of apostrophes in dates, and slightly prefers 1's and 7's over 1s and 7s but condones both.

The apostrophe is very often used in plurals of symbols, for example "that page has too many &'s and #'s on it". Some style guides state that the apostrophe is unnecessary since there is no ambiguity but that some editors and teachers prefer this usage. The addition of an s without an apostrophe may make the text difficult to read. For many numbers and symbols, a useful alternative is to write out the numbers as words (e.g. thousands instead of 1000s or 1000's, and ampersands instead of &s or &'s).

==== Family names ====
The vast majority of English references published from the late 20th century onwards disparage the use of apostrophes in family-name plurals, for example identifying Joneses as correct and Jones's as incorrect. As an exception, the Oxford Companion to the English Language (2018) reports that, in addition to Joneses etc., standard apostrophe usage does continue "in family names, especially if they end in -s, as in keeping up with the Jones's".

==== Nonstandard use ====
See § Superfluous apostrophes ("greengrocers' apostrophes"), below.

=== Use in non-English names ===
Names that are not strictly native to English sometimes have an apostrophe substituted to represent other characters (see also As a mark of elision, below).

- Anglicised versions of Irish surnames typically contain an apostrophe after an O (in place of Ó), for example "Dara O'Briain" for Dara Ó Briain.
- Some Scottish and Irish surnames use an apostrophe after an M, for example M'Gregor. The apostrophe here may be seen as marking a contraction where the prefix Mc or Mac would normally appear; however, it may also arise from a misinterpretation of printers' use of an inverted comma, ‘ (turned comma or "6-quote"), as a substitute for superscript c when printing with hand-set metal type. Compare: M'Lean, M^{c}Lean, M‘Lean.

=== Use in transliteration ===
In transliterated foreign words, an apostrophe may be used to separate letters or syllables that otherwise would likely be interpreted incorrectly. For example:

- in the Arabic word mus'haf, a transliteration of مصحف, the syllables are as in mus·haf, not mu·shaf
- in the Japanese name Shin'ichi, the apostrophe shows that the pronunciation is shi·n·i·chi (hiragana しんいち), where the letters n (ん) and i (い) are separate morae, rather than shi·ni·chi (しにち).
- in the Chinese Pinyin romanization, the apostrophe (', 隔音符號, géyīn fúhào, 'syllable-dividing mark') is used before a syllable starting with a vowel (a, o, or e) in a multiple-syllable word when the syllable does not start the word (which is most commonly realized as [ɰ]), unless the syllable immediately follows a hyphen or other dash. This is done to remove ambiguity that could arise, as in Xi'an, which consists of the two syllables xi ("西") an ("安"), compared to such words as xian ("先"). This ambiguity does not occur when tone marks are used. The two tone marks in Xīān unambiguously show that the word consists of two syllables; however, even with tone marks, the city is usually spelled with an apostrophe as Xī'ān.

Furthermore, an apostrophe may be used to indicate a glottal stop in transliterations. For example:

- in the Arabic word Qur'an, a common transliteration of (part of) القرآن al-qur'ān, the apostrophe corresponds to the diacritic maddah over the 'alif, one of the letters in the Arabic alphabet. An 'alif by itself would indicate the long vowel ā, and the maddah adds a glottal stop.

Rather than ʿ (modifier letter left half ring), the apostrophe is sometimes used to indicate a voiced pharyngeal fricative as it sounds and looks like the glottal stop to most English speakers. For example:

- in the Arabic word Ka'aba for الكعبة al-kaʿbah, the apostrophe corresponds to the Arabic letter ʿayn.

Finally, in "scientific" transliteration of Cyrillic script, the apostrophe usually represents the soft sign ь, although in "ordinary" transliteration it is usually omitted. For example,

- "The Ob River (Russian: Обь), also Ob', is a major river in western Siberia."

=== Non-standard English use ===
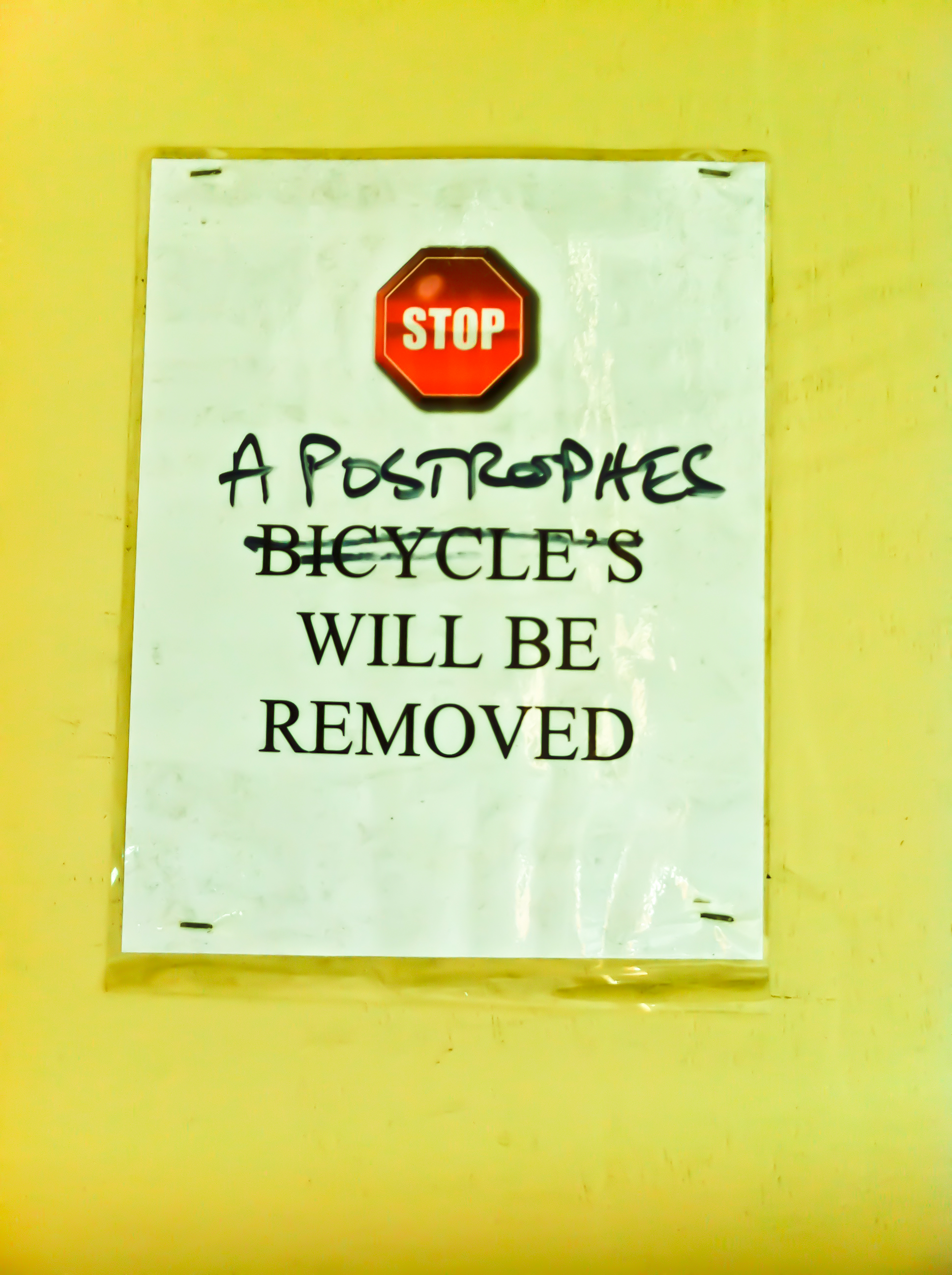

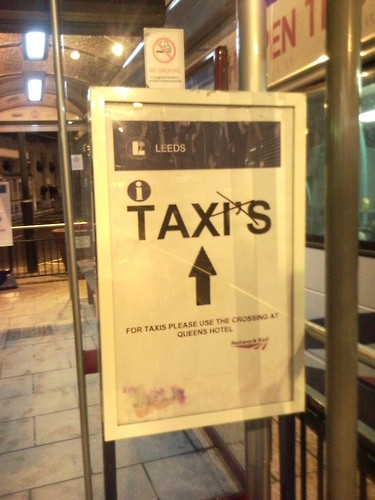
Sign at Leeds railway station, England, with an extraneous apostrophe crossed out

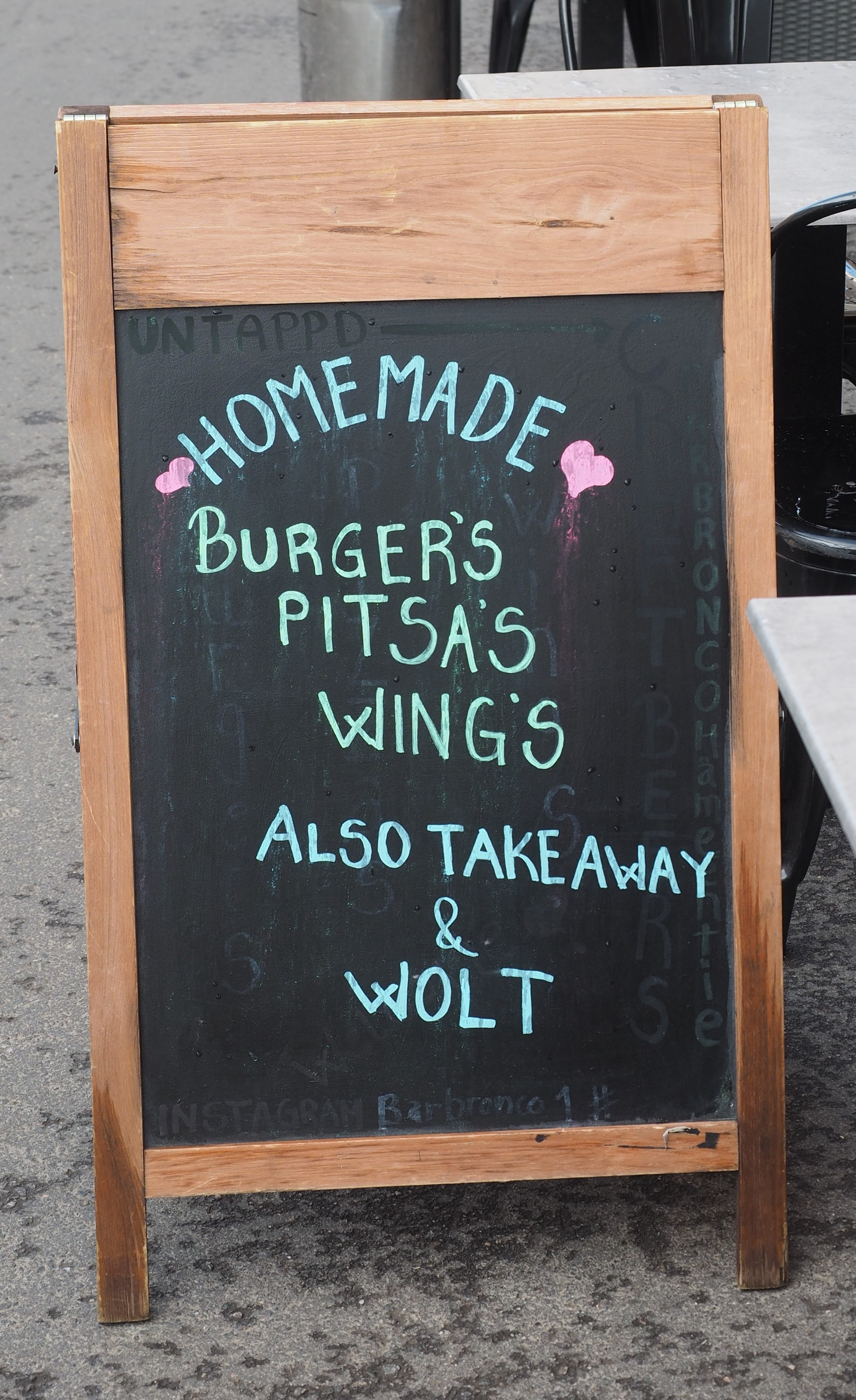
Advertisement with three superfluous apostrophes

If you have a name that ends in "s," or if you will observe home-made signs selling tomatoes or chili-and-beans, you will quickly note what can be done with a possessive apostrophe in reckless hands.

— Algis Budrys, 1965

Failure to observe standard use of the apostrophe is widespread and frequently criticised as incorrect, often generating heated debate. The British founder of the Apostrophe Protection Society earned a 2001 Ig Nobel prize for "efforts to protect, promote and defend the differences between plural and possessive". A 2004 report by British examination board OCR stated that "the inaccurate use of the apostrophe is so widespread as to be almost universal". A 2008 survey found that nearly half of the UK adults polled were unable to use the apostrophe correctly.

==== Superfluous apostrophes ("greengrocers' apostrophes") ====
Apostrophes used in a non-standard manner to form noun plurals are known as greengrocers' apostrophes or grocer's apostrophes. They are sometimes humorously called greengrocers apostrophe's, rogue apostrophes, or idiot's apostrophes (a literal translation of the German word Deppenapostroph, which criticises the misapplication of apostrophes in Denglisch). The practice, once common and acceptable (see Historical development), comes from the identical sound of the plural and possessive forms of most English nouns. It is often criticised as a form of hypercorrection coming from a widespread ignorance of the proper use of the apostrophe or of punctuation in general. Lynne Truss, author of Eats, Shoots & Leaves, points out that before the 19th century it was standard orthography to use the apostrophe to form a plural of a foreign-sounding word that ended in a vowel (e.g., banana's, folio's, logo's, quarto's, pasta's, ouzo's) to clarify pronunciation. Truss says this usage is no longer considered proper in formal writing.

The term is believed to have been coined in the middle of the 20th century by a teacher of languages working in Liverpool, at a time when such mistakes were common in the handwritten signs and advertisements of greengrocers (e.g., Apple's 1/- a pound, Orange's 1/6 a pound). Some have argued that its use in mass communication by employees of well-known companies has led to the less literate assuming it to be standard and adopting the habit themselves.

The same use of apostrophe before noun plural -s forms is sometimes made by non-native speakers of English. For example, in Dutch, the apostrophe is inserted before the s when pluralising most words ending in a vowel or y for example, baby's (English babies) and radio's (English radios). This often produces so-called "Dunglish" errors when carried over into English. Hyperforeignism has been formalised in some pseudo-anglicisms. For example, the French word pin's (from English pin) is used (with the apostrophe in both singular and plural) for collectible lapel pins. Similarly, there is an Andorran football club called FC Rànger's (after such British clubs as Rangers F.C.) and a Japanese dance group called Super Monkey's.

==== Omission ====
In the UK there is a tendency to drop apostrophes in many commonly used names such as St Annes, St Johns Lane, and so on. UK supermarket chain Tesco omits the mark where standard practice would require it. Signs in Tesco advertise (among other items) "mens magazines", "girls toys", "kids books" and "womens shoes". In his book Troublesome Words, author Bill Bryson lambasts Tesco for this, stating that "the mistake is inexcusable, and those who make it are linguistic Neanderthals."

The United States Board on Geographic Names discourages the use of possessive apostrophes in geographic names although state agencies do not always conform; Vermont's official state website provides information concerning Camel's Hump State Forest. The Geographical Names Board of New South Wales, Australia, excludes possessive apostrophes from place names, along with other punctuation.

==== Particular cases ====
George Bernard Shaw, a proponent of English spelling reform on phonetic principles, argued that the apostrophe was mostly redundant. He did not use it for spelling cant, hes, etc., in many of his writings; however, he allowed I'm and it's. Hubert Selby Jr. used a slash instead of an apostrophe mark for contractions and did not use an apostrophe at all for possessives. Lewis Carroll made greater use of apostrophes, and frequently used sha'n't, with an apostrophe in place of the elided ll as well as the more usual o. These authors' usages have not become widespread. The British pop group Hear'Say famously made unconventional use of an apostrophe in its name. Truss comments that "the naming of Hear'Say in 2001 was ... a significant milestone on the road to punctuation anarchy".

=== Criticism ===
Over the years, the use of apostrophes has been criticised. George Bernard Shaw called them "uncouth bacilli", referring to the apostrophe-like shape of many bacteria. The author and language commentator Anu Garg has called for the abolition of the apostrophe, stating "Some day this world would be free of metastatic cancers, narcissistic con men, and the apostrophe". In his book American Speech, linguist Steven Byington stated of the apostrophe that "the language would be none the worse for its abolition". Adrian Room, in his English Journal article "Axing the Apostrophe", argued that apostrophes are unnecessary, and context will resolve any ambiguity.

In a letter to the English Journal, Peter Brodie stated that apostrophes are "largely decorative ... [and] rarely clarify meaning". John C. Wells, emeritus professor of phonetics at University College London, says the apostrophe is "a waste of time". The Apostrophe Protection Society, founded by retired journalist John Richards in 2001, closed in 2019, after a period of 18 years of campaigning for its preservation and correct usage. Closing the association, Richards, then aged 96, said that "We, and our many supporters worldwide, have done our best but the ignorance and laziness present in modern times have won!". In a Chronicle of Higher Education blog, Geoffrey Pullum proposed that the apostrophe be considered the 27th letter of the alphabet, arguing that it is not a form of punctuation.

== Non-English use ==
=== As a mark of elision ===
In many languages, especially European languages, the apostrophe is used to indicate the elision of one or more sounds, as in English.

- In Albanian, the apostrophe is used to show that a vowel has been omitted from words, especially in different forms of verbs and in some forms of personal pronoun. For example, t'i: them (from të + i: them), m'i mori (from më + i mori). It is used too in some of the forms of possessive pronouns, for example: s'ëmës (from së ëmës).
- In Afrikaans, as in Dutch, the apostrophe is used to show that letters have been omitted from words. The most common use is in the indefinite article 'n, which is a contraction of een meaning 'one' (the number). As the initial ⟨e⟩ is omitted and cannot be capitalised, the second word in a sentence that begins with 'n is capitalised instead. For example: 'n Boom is groen, 'A tree is green'. In addition, the apostrophe is used for plurals and diminutives where the root ends with long vowels, e.g. foto's, taxi's, Lulu's, Lulu'tjie, etc.
- In Catalan, French, Italian, Ligurian, and Occitan word sequences such as (coup) d'état, (maître) d'hôtel (often shortened to maître d', when used in English), L'Aquila, L'Alpe d'Huez and L'Hospitalet de Llobregat the final vowel in the first word (de 'of', le 'the', etc.) is elided because the word that follows it starts with a vowel or a mute h. French elision similarly occurs with qu'il instead of que il ('that he'), c'est instead of ce est ('it is' / 'it's'), and so on. Catalan, French, Italian, and Occitan surnames sometimes contain apostrophes of elision, e.g. d’Alembert, D'Angelo.
  - French feminine singular possessive adjectives do not undergo such elision anymore, but change to the masculine form instead: ma preceding église becomes mon église ('my church'). (Note: In early French such elisions did occur: m'espée (ma +espée, modern French mon épée: 'my sword'), s'enfance (sa +enfance, son enfance: 'his or her childhood'). But the only modern survivals of this elision with apostrophe are m'amie and m'amour, as archaic and idiomatic alternatives to mon amie and mon amour ('my [female] friend', 'my love'); forms without the apostrophe also used: mamie or ma mie, mamour.)
  - Quebec's Bill 101, which dictates the use of French in the province, prohibits the use of apostrophes in proper names in which it would not be used in proper French (thus the international donut chain Tim Hortons, originally spelled with the possessive apostrophe as Tim Horton's, was required to drop the apostrophe in Quebec to comply with Bill 101).
- In Danish, apostrophes are sometimes seen on commercial materials. One might commonly see Ta' mig med ('Take me with [you]') next to a stand with advertisement leaflets; that would be written Tag mig med in standard orthography. As in German, an apostrophe is not used to indicate the possessive, unless the base word ends with an ⟨s⟩, ⟨x⟩, or ⟨z⟩. For example, Esajas' bog ('Esajas' book', i.e. the book belonging to Esajas) has an apostrophe, but Annas bog ('Anna's book') does not.
- In Dutch, as in Afrikaans, the apostrophe is used to indicate omitted characters. For example, the indefinite article een can be shortened to 'n, and the definite article het shortened to 't. When this happens in the first word of a sentence, the second word of the sentence is capitalised. In general, this way of using the apostrophe is considered non-standard, except as genitivus temporalis in 's morgens, 's middags, 's avonds, 's nachts (for des morgens, des middags, des avonds, des nachts, 'at morning, at afternoon, at evening, at night') and in some frozen place names such as 's-Hertogenbosch (possessive, lit. "The Duke's forest"), 's-Gravenhage (traditional name of The Hague, lit. "The Count's hedge"), 's-Gravenbrakel (Braine-le-Comte, in Belgium), 's-Hertogenrade (Herzogenrath, in Germany), etc. In addition, the apostrophe is used for plurals where the singulars end with long vowels, e.g. foto's, taxi's; and for the genitive of proper names ending with these vowels, e.g. Anna's, Otto's. These are in fact elided vowels; use of the apostrophe prevents spellings like fotoos and Annaas; however, most diminutives do not use an apostrophe where the plural forms would; producing spellings such as fotootje and taxietje.
- In Esperanto, the Fundamento limits the elision mark to the definite article l' (from la) and singular nominative nouns (kor' from koro, 'heart'). This is mostly confined to poetry and songs. Idiomatic phrases such as dank' al (from (kun) danko al, 'thanks to') and del' (from de la 'of the') are nonetheless frequent. In-word elision is usually marked with a hyphen, as in D-ro (from doktoro, 'Dr'). Some early guides used and advocated the use of apostrophes between word parts, to aid recognition of such compound words as gitar'ist'o, 'guitarist'; but in the latter case, modern usage is to use either a hyphen or a middle dot when disambiguation is necessary, as in ĉas-hundo or ĉas·hundo, "a hunting dog", not to be mispronounced as ĉa.ŝun.do.
- In Finnish, the apostrophe is used in inflected forms of words whose basic form has a ⟨k⟩ between similar vowels, to show that the ⟨k⟩ has elided in the inflected form: for example the word raaka ("raw") becomes raa'at in the plural. The apostrophe shows that the identical vowels on either side of it belong to different syllables.
- The Galician language standard allows the use of the apostrophe (apóstrofo) for contractions that normally do not use it (e.g.: de + a= da), when the second element begins a proper noun, generally a title: o argumento d'A Esmorga 'the plot of A Esmorga' ("A Esmorga" is a novel). They are also used to reproduce oral elisions and, as stated below, to join (or split) commercial names of popular public establishments such as restaurants (O'Pote, The pot).
- In Ganda, when a word ending with a vowel is followed by a word beginning with a vowel, the final vowel of the first word is elided and the initial vowel of the second word lengthened in compensation. When the first word is a monosyllable, this elision is represented in the orthography with an apostrophe: in taata w'abaana 'the father of the children', wa ('of') becomes w'; in y'ani? ('who is it?'), ye ('who') becomes y'. But the final vowel of a polysyllable is always written, even if it is elided in speech: omusajja oyo ('this man'), not omusajj'oyo, because omusajja ('man') is a polysyllable.
- In German an apostrophe is used almost exclusively to indicate omitted letters. It is not used for plurals or most of the possessive forms. The only exceptions are the possessive cases of names ending in an "s"-sound as in Max' Vater ('Max's father'), or "to prevent ambiguities" in all other possessive cases of names, as in Andrea's Blumenladen (referring to the female name Andrea, not the male name Andreas). The English/Saxon style of using an apostrophe for possession was introduced after the spelling reform, but is strongly disagreed on by native speakers, and discouraged. Although possessive usage (beyond the exceptions) is widespread, it is often deemed incorrect. The German equivalent of "greengrocers' apostrophes" would be the derogatory Deppenapostroph ('idiot's apostrophe';).
- In modern printings of Ancient Greek, apostrophes are also used to mark elision. Some Ancient Greek words that end in short vowels elide when the next word starts with a vowel. For example, many Ancient Greek authors would write δἄλλος (d'állos) for δὲ ἄλλος (dè állos) and ἆροὐ (âr'ou) for ἆρα οὐ (âra ou). Such modern usage should be carefully distinguished from polytonic Greek's native rough and smooth breathing marks, which usually appear as a form of rounded apostrophe.
- In Hebrew, the geresh (׳), often typed as an apostrophe, is used to denote abbreviations. A double geresh (״), known by the dual form gershayim, is used to denote acronyms or initialisms; it is inserted before (i.e., to the right of) the last letter of the acronym. Examples: פרופ׳ (abbreviation for פרופסור, profesor, 'professor'); נ״ב (nun-bet, 'P.S.'). The geresh is also used to indicate the elision of a sound; however, this use is much less frequent, and confined to the purpose of imitating a natural, informal utterance, for example: אנ׳לא (anlo – short for אני לא, ani lo, 'I am/do not').
- In Irish, the past tense of verbs beginning with a vowel, or with ⟨fh⟩ followed by a vowel, begins with d' (elision of do), for example do oscail becomes d'oscail ('opened') and do fhill becomes d'fhill ('returned'). The copula is is often elided to 's, and do ('to'), mo ('my') etc. are elided before f and vowels.
- In Italian it is used for elision with pronouns, as in l'ha instead of la ha; with articles, as in l'opera instead of la opera; and for truncation, as in po' instead of poco. Stylistically, sentences beginning with È (as in È vero che ...) are often rendered as E' in newspapers, to minimise leading (inter-line spacing).
- In modern Norwegian, the apostrophe marks that a word has been contracted, such as ha'kke from har ikke ('have/has not'). Unlike English and French, such elisions are not accepted as part of standard orthography but are used to create a more "oral style" in writing. The apostrophe is also used to mark the genitive for words that end in an -s sound: words ending in -s, -x, and -z, some speakers also including words ending in the sound [ʂ]. As Norwegian does not form the plural with -s, there is no need to distinguish between an -s forming the possessive and the -s forming the plural. Therefore, we have mann ('man') and manns ('man's'), without apostrophe, but los ('naval pilot') and los' ('naval pilot's'). Indicating the possessive for the two former American presidents named George Bush, whose names end in [ʂ], could be written as both Bushs (simply adding an -s to the name) and Bush' (adding an apostrophe to the end of the name).
- In Portuguese the apostrophe is used to reproduce certain popular pronunciations such as s'enxerga ('pay attention to yourself') or in a few combinations of word, when there is the suppression of the vowel of the preposition de in certain compound words (the ones formed by two or more stems) such as caixa-d'água ('water tower'), galinha-d'angola ('guineafowl'), pau-d'alho (a plant species, Gallesia integrifolia), estrela-d'alva ('morning star'), etc. The apostrophe is most commonly not used in the word pra, the reduced or popular form of the preposition para, but some advocate for its used in preposition + article contractions: para + a = p'ra/pra, para + o = p'ro/pro, etc..
- In modern Spanish the apostrophe is no longer used to indicate elision in standard writing, although it can sometimes be found in older poetry for that purpose. (Note: Examples include Nuestras vidas son los ríos/que van a dar en la mar,/qu'es el morir. meaning 'Our lives are the rivers/that flow to give to the sea,/which is death.' (from Coplas de Don Jorge Manrique por la muerte de su padre, 1477) and ¿... qué me ha de aprovechar ver la pintura/d'aquel que con las alas derretidas ...? meaning '... what could it help me to see the painting of that one with the melted wings ...?' (from the 12th sonnet of Garcilazo de la Vega, c. 1500–36).) Instead Spanish writes out the words in full, for example de enero and mi hijo, and the elisions are supplied by the speaker. There is an exception for the contractions del and al, which respectively stand for [de + el] and [a + el], and which use no apostrophe.
- In Swedish, the apostrophe marks an elision, such as på sta'n, short for på staden ('in the city'), to make the text more similar to the spoken language. This is relaxed style, fairly rarely used, and would not be used by traditional newspapers in political articles, but could be used in entertainment related articles and similar. The formal way to denote elision in Swedish is by using colon, e.g. S:t Erik for Sankt Erik, which is rarely spelled out in full. The apostrophe must not be used to indicate the possessive except – although not mandatory – when there is already an s, x or z present in the base form, as in Lukas' bok.
- Welsh uses the apostrophe to mark elision of the definite article yr ('the') following a vowel (a, e, i, o, u, y, or, in Welsh, w), as in i'r tŷ, 'to the house'. It is also used with the particle yn, such as with mae hi'n, 'she is'.

=== As a glottal stop ===
Several languages and transliteration systems use the apostrophe or some similar mark to indicate a glottal stop, sometimes considering it a letter of the alphabet:

- In several Finno-Ugric languages, such as Estonian and Finnish; for example in the Finnish word raa’an, being the genitive or accusative of raaka ('raw').
- In Guarani, it is called puso /puˈso/, and used in the words ñe'ẽ (language, to speak), ka'a (grass), a'ỹ (sterile).
- In Hawaiian, the ʻokina ⟨ʻ⟩, an inverted apostrophe, is often rendered as ⟨'⟩. It is considered a letter of the alphabet.
- Mayan.
- In the Tongan language, the apostrophe is called a fakauʻa and is the last letter of the alphabet. It represents the glottal stop. Like the ʻokina, it is inverted.
- Various other Austronesian languages, such as Samoan, Tahitian, and Chamorro.
- Tetum, one of the official languages of East Timor.
- The Brazilian native Tupi language.
- Mossi (Mooré), a language of Burkina Faso.
- In Võro, the apostrophe is used in parallel with the letter q as symbol of plural, for example majaq or maja' ('houses'), imperative annaq or anna', and in all other word forms with glottal stop.
- Several fictional languages such as Klingon, D'ni, Mando'a or Na'vi add apostrophes to make names appear "alien".

The apostrophe represents sounds resembling the glottal stop in the Turkic languages and in some romanizations of Semitic languages, including Arabic and Hebrew. In that case, the letter 'ayn (Arabic ع and Hebrew ע) is correspondingly transliterated with the opening single quotation mark.

=== As a mark of palatalization or non-palatalization ===
Some languages and transliteration systems use the apostrophe to mark the presence, or the lack of, palatalization:

- In Belarusian and Ukrainian, the apostrophe is used between a consonant and a following "soft" (iotated) vowel (Be.: е, ё, ю, я; Uk.: є, ї, ю, я) to indicate that no palatalization of the preceding consonant takes place, and the vowel is pronounced in the same way as at the beginning of a word. It therefore marks a morpheme boundary before /j/ and, in Belarusian, is a letter of the alphabet (as the hard sign in Russian is) rather than a simple punctuation mark in English, as it is not a punctuation mark in Belarusian. It appears frequently in Ukrainian, as, for instance, in the words: ⟨п'ять⟩ (p"jat') 'five', ⟨від'їзд⟩ (vid"jizd) 'departure', ⟨об'єднаний⟩ (ob"jednanyj) 'united', ⟨з'ясувати⟩ (z"jasuvaty) 'to clear up, explain', ⟨п'єса⟩ (p"jesa) play (drama), etc.
- In Russian and some derived alphabets, the same function has been served by the hard sign (ъ, formerly called yer). But the apostrophe saw some use as a substitute after 1918, when Soviet authorities enforced an orthographic reform by confiscating movable type bearing the hard sign from stubborn printing houses in Petrograd.
- In some Latin transliterations of certain Cyrillic alphabets (for Belarusian, Russian, and Ukrainian), the apostrophe is used to replace the soft sign (ь, indicating palatalization of the preceding consonant), e.g., Русь is transliterated Rus' according to the BGN/PCGN system. The prime symbol is also used for the same purpose. Some of these transliteration schemes use a double apostrophe ( ˮ ) to represent the apostrophe in Ukrainian and Belarusian text and the hard sign (ъ) in Russian text, e.g. Ukrainian слов'янське ('Slavic') is transliterated as slov"jans'ke.
- Some Karelian orthographies use an apostrophe to indicate palatalization, e.g. n'evvuo ('to give advice'), d'uuri ('just (like)'), el'vüttiä ('to revive').
- In Võro an apostrophe is often (also in the Võro Wikipedia) used as a simplification to replace the regular Võro palatalization mark, which is the accute accent, for example as'aq replacing regular form aśaq ('things').

=== To separate morphemes ===
Some languages use the apostrophe to separate the root of a word and its affixes, especially if the root is foreign and unassimilated.

- In Danish an apostrophe is sometimes used to join the enclitic definite article to words of foreign origin, or to other words that would otherwise look awkward. For example, one would write IP'en to mean "the IP address". There is some variation in what is considered "awkward enough" to warrant an apostrophe; for instance, long-established words such as firma ('company') or niveau ('level') might be written firma'et and niveau'et, but will generally be seen without an apostrophe. Due to Danish influence, this usage of the apostrophe can also be seen in Norwegian, but is non-standard – a hyphen should be used instead: e.g. CD-en (the CD).
- In Estonian, apostrophes can be used in the declension of some foreign names to separate the stem from any declension endings; e.g., Monet' (genitive case) or Monet'sse (illative case) of Monet.
- In Finnish, apostrophes are used in the declension of foreign names or loan words that end in a consonant when written but are pronounced with a vowel ending, e.g. show'ssa ('in a show'), Bordeaux'hon ('to Bordeaux'). For Finnish as well as Swedish, there is a closely related use of the colon.
- In Polish, the apostrophe is used exclusively for marking inflections of words and word-like elements (but not acronyms – a hyphen is used instead) whose spelling conflicts with the normal rules of inflection. This mainly affects foreign words and names. For instance, one would correctly write Kampania Ala Gore'a for "Al Gore's campaign". In this example, Ala is spelled without an apostrophe, since its spelling and pronunciation fit into normal Polish rules; but Gore'a needs the apostrophe, because e disappears from the pronunciation, changing the inflection pattern. This rule is often misunderstood as calling for an apostrophe after all foreign words, regardless of their pronunciation, yielding the incorrect Kampania Al'a Gore'a, for example. The effect is akin to the greengrocers' apostrophe
- In Turkish, proper nouns are capitalised and an apostrophe is inserted between the noun and any following inflectional suffix, e.g. İstanbul'da ("in Istanbul"), contrasting with okulda ("in school", okul is a common noun) and İstanbullu ('Istanbulite', -lu is a derivational suffix).
- In Welsh the apostrophe is used with infixed pronouns in order to distinguish them from the preceding word (e.g. a'm chwaer, 'and my sister' as opposed to am chwaer, 'about a sister').

=== Miscellaneous uses in other languages ===
- In Breton, the combination cʼh is used for the consonant /x/ (like ch in Scottish English Loch Ness), while ch is used for the consonant /ʃ/ (as in French chat or English she).
- In Czech, an apostrophe is used for writing to indicate spoken or informal language where the writer wants to express the natural way of informal speech, but it should not be used in formal text or text of a serious nature. E.g., instead of četl ('he read'), the word form čet' is used. Čet' is the informal variant of the verb form četl, at least in some varieties. These two words are the same in meaning, but to use the informal form gives the text a more natural tone as if a friend were talking to you. Furthermore, the same as in the Slovak case below holds for lowercase t and d, and for the two-digit year notation.
- In Finnish, one of the consonant gradation patterns is the change of a k into a hiatus, e.g. keko → keon ('a pile' → 'a pile's'). This hiatus has to be indicated in spelling with an apostrophe if a long vowel (represented by doubling (e.g. oo) or the final vowel of a diphthong (e.g. uo) would be immediately followed by the same vowel, e.g. ruoko → ruo'on, vaaka → vaa'an. This is in contrast to compound words, where the problem of a vowel recurring over a syllable break is solved with a hyphen, e.g. maa-ala, 'land area'. Similarly, the apostrophe is used to mark the hiatus (contraction) that occurs in poetry, e.g. miss' on for missä on ('where is').
- Galician restaurants sometimes use ' in their names following the standard article O ('the').
- In Ganda, ng' (pronounced /ŋ/) is used in place of ŋ on keyboards where this character is not available. The apostrophe distinguishes it from the letter combination ng (pronounced [ŋɡ]), which has separate use in the language. Compare this with the Swahili usage below.
- In Hebrew, the geresh (a diacritic similar to the apostrophe and often represented by one) is used for several purposes other than to mark an elision:
  - As an adjacent to letters to show sounds that are not represented in the Hebrew alphabet: Sounds such as /dʒ/ (English j as in job), /θ/ (English th as in thigh), and /tʃ/ (English ch as in check) are indicated using ג, ת, and צ with a geresh (informally chupchik). For example, the name George is spelled ג׳ורג׳ in Hebrew (with ג׳ representing the first and last consonants).
  - To denote a Hebrew numeral (e.g., נ׳, which stands for '50')
  - To denote a Hebrew letter which stands for itself (e.g., מ׳ – the letter mem)
  - Gershayim (a double geresh) to denote a Hebrew letter name (e.g., למ״ד – the letter lamed)
  - Another (rarer) use of geresh is to denote the last syllable (which in some cases, but not all, is a suffix) in some words of Yiddish origin (e.g., חבר׳ה, מיידל׳ה).
  - In the Middle Ages and the Early modern period, gershayim were also used to denote foreign words, as well as a means of emphasis.
- In Italian, an apostrophe is sometimes used as a substitute for a grave or an acute accent. This may be done after an initial E or an accented final vowel (when writing in all-capitals), or when the proper form of the letter is unavailable for technical reasons. So a sentence beginning È vero che ... ('It is true that...') may be written as E' vero che .... This form is often seen in newspapers, as it is the only case of an accent above the cap height and its omission permits the text to be more closely spaced (leading). Less commonly, a forename like Niccolò might be rendered as Niccolo', or NICCOLO'; perché, as perche', or PERCHE'. This applies only to machine or computer writing, in the absence of a suitable keyboard.
- In Jèrriais, one of the uses of the apostrophe is to mark gemination, or consonant length: For example, t't represents /tː/, s's /sː/, n'n /nː/, th'th /ðː/, and ch'ch /ʃː/ (contrasted with /t/, /s/, /n/, /ð/, and /ʃ/).
- In Lithuanian, the apostrophe is occasionally used to add a Lithuanized ending on an international word, e.g. "parking'as", "Skype'as", "Facebook'as".
- In standard Lojban orthography, the apostrophe is a letter in its own right (called y'y [əhə]) that can appear only between two vowels, and is phonemically realised as either [h] or, more rarely, [θ].
- In Macedonian the apostrophe is sometimes used to represent the sound schwa, which can be found on dialectal levels, but not in the Standard Macedonian.
- In Slovak, the caron over lowercase t, d, l, and uppercase L consonants resembles an apostrophe, for example, ď, ť, ľ, and Ľ. This is especially so in certain common typographic renderings. But it is non-standard to use an apostrophe instead of the caron. There is also l with an acute accent: ĺ, Ĺ. In Slovak the apostrophe is properly used only to indicate elision in certain words (tys', as an abbreviated form of ty si ('you are'), or hor' for hore ('up')); however, these elisions are restricted to poetry (with a few exceptions). Moreover, the apostrophe is also used before a two-digit year number (to indicate the omission of the first two digits): '87 (usually used for 1987).
- In Swahili, an apostrophe after ng shows that there is no sound of /ɡ/ after the /ŋ/ sound; that is, that the ng is pronounced as in English singer, not as in English finger.
- In Switzerland, the apostrophe is used as thousands separator alongside the fixed space (e.g., 2'000'000 or 2000000 for two million) in all four national languages.
- In the new Uzbek Latin alphabet adopted in 1995, the apostrophe serves as a diacritical mark to distinguish different phonemes written with the same letter: it differentiates oʻ (corresponding to Cyrillic ў) from o, and gʻ (Cyrillic ғ) from g. This avoids the use of special characters, allowing Uzbek to be typed with ease in ordinary ASCII on any Latin keyboard. In addition, a postvocalic apostrophe in Uzbek represents the glottal stop phoneme derived from Arabic hamzah or ʼayn, replacing Cyrillic ъ.
- In English Yorkshire dialect, the apostrophe is used to represent the word the, which is contracted to a more glottal (or 'unreleased') /t/ sound. Most users will write in t'barn ('in the barn'), on t'step ('on the step'); and those unfamiliar with Yorkshire speech will often make these sound like intuh barn and ontuh step. A more accurate rendition might be in't barn and on't step, although even this does not truly convey correct Yorkshire pronunciation as the t is more like a glottal stop.
- In the pinyin (hànyǔ pīnyīn) system of romanization for Standard Chinese, an apostrophe is often loosely said to separate syllables in a word where ambiguity could arise. Example: the standard romanization for the name of the city Xī'ān includes an apostrophe to distinguish it from a single-syllable word xian. More strictly, it is standard to place an apostrophe only before every a, e, or o that starts a new syllable after the first if it is not preceded by a hyphen or a dash. Examples: Tiān'ānmén, Yǎ'ān; but simply Jǐnán, in which the syllables are ji and nan, since the absence of an apostrophe shows that the syllables are not jin and an (contrast Jīn'ān). This is a kind of morpheme-separation marking
- In the largely superseded Wade–Giles romanization for Standard Chinese, an apostrophe marks aspiration of the preceding consonant sound. Example: in tsê (pinyin ze) the consonant represented by ts is unaspirated, but in ts'ê (pinyin ce) the consonant represented by ts' is aspirated. Some academic users of the system write this character as a spiritus asper (ʽ or ʻ) or single left (opening) quotation mark (‘).
- In some systems of romanization for the Japanese, the apostrophe is used between moras in ambiguous situations, to differentiate between, for example, na and n + a. This is similar to the practice in Pinyin.
- In science fiction and fantasy, the apostrophe is often used in fictional names, sometimes to indicate a glottal stop (for example Mitth'raw'nuruodo in Star Wars), but also sometimes simply for decoration.

== Typographic form ==
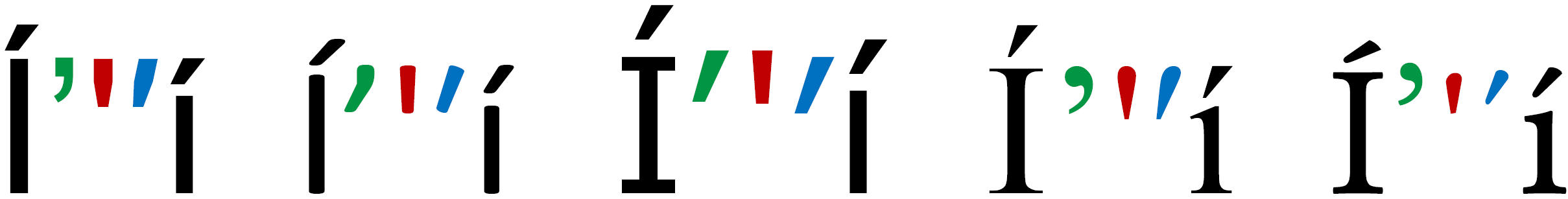
Punctuation (green) and typewriter (red) apostrophe, followed by a prime (blue), between letters Í and í (using acute accent), using the fonts: Arial, Calibri, Tahoma, Times New Roman, and Linux Libertine

The shape of the apostrophe originated in manuscript writing, as a point with a downwards tail curving clockwise. This is the form of the modern punctuation apostrophe (’), (which is also known informally as the typeset apostrophe, the typographic apostrophe or the curly apostrophe) and of the right single quotation mark. Later sans-serif typefaces had stylised apostrophes with a more geometric or simplified form, but usually retaining the same directional bias as a closing quotation mark.

With the invention of the typewriter, a "neutral" or "straight" shape quotation mark, ' (known as the "typewriter apostrophe" or the "ASCII apostrophe"), was created to represent a number of different glyphs with a single keystroke: the apostrophe, both the opening and the closing single quotation marks, the single primes, and on some typewriters even the exclamation point (by backspacing and overprinting with a period). This is known as the typewriter apostrophe or vertical apostrophe. The same convention was adopted for double quotation marks ("). Both simplifications carried over to computer keyboards and the ASCII character set.

== Informal use in measurement and mathematics ==
Formally, the symbol used to represent a foot of length, depth, or height, is ′ (prime) and that for the inch is ″ (double prime). (Thus, for example, the notation 5′ 7″ signifies 5 feet and 7 inches). Similarly, the prime symbol is the formal representation of a minute of arc (1/60 of a degree in geometry and geomatics), and double prime represents a second of arc (for example, 17°54′32″ represents 17 degrees 54 minutes and 32 seconds). Similarly in mathematics, the prime is generally used to generate more variable names for similar things without resorting to subscripts, with x′ generally meaning something related to (or derived from) x. Because of the very close similarity of the typewriter apostrophe and typewriter double quote to prime and double prime, substitution in informal contexts is ubiquitous, but using the typewriter characters is deprecated in contexts where proper typography is important. Using the typewriter characters also risks having an automatic process "correct" them into punctuation-style apostrophes and quotation marks, which are less similar to the intended symbols.

== Unicode ==
In its Unicode Standard (version 13.0), the Unicode Consortium describes three characters that represent apostrophe:

- U+0027 ' APOSTROPHE: The typewriter or ASCII apostrophe. The standard remarks:

For historical reasons, U+0027 is a particularly overloaded character. In ASCII, it is used to represent a punctuation mark (such as right single quotation mark, left single quotation mark, apostrophe punctuation, vertical line, or prime) or a modifier letter (such as apostrophe modifier or acute accent). Punctuation marks generally break words; modifier letters generally are considered part of a word.

- U+2019 ’ RIGHT SINGLE QUOTATION MARK is preferred where the character is to represent a punctuation mark, as for contractions: "we’ve", and the code is also referred to as a punctuation apostrophe. The closing single quote and the apostrophe were unified in Unicode 2.1 "to correct problems in the mapping tables from Windows and Macintosh code pages." This can make searching text more difficult as quotes and apostrophes cannot be distinguished without context.
- U+02BC ʼ MODIFIER LETTER APOSTROPHE (from Unicode block Spacing Modifier Letters) is preferred where the apostrophe is to represent a modifier letter (for example, in transliterations to indicate a glottal stop). In the latter case, it is also referred to as a letter apostrophe. The letter apostrophe may be used, for example, in transliterations to represent the Arabic glottal stop (hamza) or the Cyrillic "soft sign", or in some orthographies such as cʼh of Breton, where this combination is an independent trigraph. ICANN considers this the proper character for Ukrainian apostrophe within IDNs. This character is rendered identically to U+2019 in the Unicode code charts, and the standard cautions that one should never assume this code is used in any language.

=== Characters similar to apostrophe ===
- U+0027 ' APOSTROPHE
- U+0060 ` GRAVE ACCENT
- U+00B4 ´ ACUTE ACCENT
- U+02B9 ʹ MODIFIER LETTER PRIME
- U+02BB ʻ MODIFIER LETTER TURNED COMMA Hawaiian ʻokina and for the transliteration of Arabic and Hebrew ʻayn.
- U+02BC ʼ MODIFIER LETTER APOSTROPHE
- U+02BD ʽ MODIFIER LETTER REVERSED COMMA
- U+02BE ʾ MODIFIER LETTER RIGHT HALF RING Arabic hamza and Hebrew alef.
- U+02BF ʿ MODIFIER LETTER LEFT HALF RING Arabic and Hebrew ʿayin.
- U+02C8 ˈ MODIFIER LETTER VERTICAL LINE Stress accent or dynamic accent.
- U+02CA ˊ MODIFIER LETTER ACUTE ACCENT
- U+02EE ˮ MODIFIER LETTER DOUBLE APOSTROPHE One of two characters for glottal stop in Nenets.
- U+0301 ◌́ COMBINING ACUTE ACCENT
- U+0313 ◌̓ COMBINING COMMA ABOVE Also known as combining Greek psili.
- U+0314 ◌̔ COMBINING REVERSED COMMA ABOVE Also known as combining Greek dasia.
- U+0315 ◌̕ COMBINING COMMA ABOVE RIGHT
- U+0341 ◌́ COMBINING ACUTE TONE MARK
- U+0343 ◌̓ COMBINING GREEK KORONIS Identical to U+0313.
- U+0374 ʹ GREEK NUMERAL SIGN Also known as Greek dexia keraia.
- U+0384 ΄ GREEK TONOS
- U+055A ՚ ARMENIAN APOSTROPHE
- U+059C ֜ HEBREW ACCENT GERESH
- U+059D ֝ HEBREW ACCENT GERESH MUQDAM
- U+05F3 ׳ HEBREW PUNCTUATION GERESH
- U+1FBD ᾽ GREEK KORONIS
- U+1FBF ᾿ GREEK PSILI
- U+2018 ‘ LEFT SINGLE QUOTATION MARK (or turned comma, which can mark a letter's omission)
- U+2019 ’ RIGHT SINGLE QUOTATION MARK
- U+201B ‛ SINGLE HIGH-REVERSED-9 QUOTATION MARK
- U+2032 ′ PRIME
- U+2035 ‵ REVERSED PRIME
- U+A78B Ꞌ LATIN CAPITAL LETTER SALTILLO Saltillo of the languages of Mexico.
- U+A78C ꞌ LATIN SMALL LETTER SALTILLO
- U+FF07 ＇ FULLWIDTH APOSTROPHE Fullwidth form of the typewriter apostrophe.

== Computing ==
In modern computing practice, Unicode is the standard and default method for character encoding; however, Unicode itself and many legacy applications have echoes of earlier practices. Furthermore, the limited character set provided by computer keyboards has also required practical and pragmatic adjustments. These issues are detailed below.

=== ASCII encoding ===
The typewriter apostrophe, ', was inherited by computer keyboards, and is the only apostrophe character available in the (7-bit) ASCII character encoding, at code value 0x27 (39). In ASCII, it may be used to represent any of left single quotation mark, right single quotation mark, apostrophe, vertical line or prime (punctuation marks), or an acute accent (modifier letters). In Unicode, which is a superset of ASCII, it is encoded as U+0027 ' APOSTROPHE. Many earlier (pre-1985) computer displays and printers rendered the ASCII apostrophe as a punctuation apostrophe, and rendered the backtick (freestanding grave accent symbol, `, 0x60, 96) as a matching left single quotation mark. This allowed a more "typeset" appearance of text: ``I can't'' would appear as ``I can´t´´ on these systems. This can still be seen in many documents prepared at that time, and is still used in the TeX typesetting system to create typographic quotes.

=== Punctuation apostrophe in 8-bit encodings ===
Support for the punctuation apostrophe ( ’ ) was introduced in several 8-bit character encodings, such as the original Apple Macintosh operating system's Mac Roman character set (in 1984), and later in the CP1252 encoding of Microsoft Windows. Both sets also used this code point for a closing single quote. There is no such character in ISO 8859-1. The Microsoft Windows code page CP1252 (sometimes incorrectly called ANSI or ISO-Latin) contains the punctuation apostrophe at 0x92. Due to "smart quotes" in Microsoft software converting the ASCII apostrophe to this value, other software makers have been effectively forced to adopt this as a de facto convention. For instance, the HTML5 standard specifies that this value is interpreted as this character from CP1252. Some earlier non-Microsoft browsers would display a '?' for this and make web pages composed with Microsoft software somewhat hard to read. In Unicode, which practically all vendors have adopted, this apostrophe is encoded as U+2019 ’ RIGHT SINGLE QUOTATION MARK. The canonical name reflects the primary usage; its further use as the preferred form for an apostrophe is recorded in the database.

=== Entering apostrophes ===
Although ubiquitous in typeset material, the punctuation apostrophe (’) is rather difficult to enter on a computer, since it does not have its own key on most types of consumer keyboard. Outside the world of professional typesetting and graphic design, most people use the typewriter apostrophe ('). Because typewriter apostrophes are now often automatically converted to punctuation apostrophes by word processing and similar software, the punctuation apostrophe routinely appears in documents produced by non-professionals (albeit sometimes incorrectly—see § Smart Quotes below). XML (and hence XHTML) defines an &apos; character entity reference for the ASCII typewriter apostrophe. This entity reference is officially supported in HTML since HTML 5. (Note: It is not defined in HTML 4 despite all the other predefined character entities from XML being defined.)

=== Smart quotes ===
To make punctuation apostrophes easier to enter, word processing and publishing software often convert typewriter apostrophes to punctuation apostrophes during text entry (at the same time converting opening and closing single and double quotes to their standard left-handed or right-handed forms). A similar facility may be offered on web servers after submitting text in a form field, e.g. on weblogs or free encyclopedias. This is known as the smart quotes feature; apostrophes and quotation marks that are not automatically altered by computer programs are known as dumb quotes.

Such conversion is not always correct. Smart quotes features often incorrectly convert a leading apostrophe to an opening quotation mark (e.g., in abbreviations of years: ‘29 rather than the correct ’29 for the years 1929 or 2029 (depending on context); or ‘twas instead of ’twas as the archaic abbreviation of it was). Smart quote features also often fail to recognise situations when a prime rather than an apostrophe is needed; for example, incorrectly rendering the latitude 49° 53′ 08″ as 49° 53’ 08”.

In Microsoft Word, it is possible to turn smart quotes off (in some versions, by navigating through Tools, AutoCorrect, AutoFormat as you type, and then unchecking the appropriate option). Alternatively, typing Control-Z (for Undo) immediately after entering the apostrophe will convert it back to a typewriter apostrophe. In Microsoft Word for Windows, holding down the Control key while typing two apostrophes will produce a single punctuation apostrophe.

=== Programming ===
Some programming languages, like Pascal, use the ASCII apostrophe to delimit string literals. In many languages, including JavaScript, ECMAScript, and Python, either the apostrophe or the double quote may be used, allowing string literals to contain the other character (but not to contain both without using an escape character), e.g. foo='He said "Bar!"';. Strings delimited with apostrophes are often called single quoted. Some languages, such as Perl, PHP, and many shell languages, treat single quoted strings as "raw" strings, while double quoted strings have expressions (such as "$variable") replaced with their values when interpreted.

The C programming language (and many derived languages like C++, Java, C#, and Scala) uses apostrophes to delimit a character literal. In these languages a character is a different object than a one-letter string. In C++, since C++14, and C, since C23, apostrophes can be included as optional digit separators in numeric literals. In Visual Basic (and earlier Microsoft BASIC dialects such as QuickBASIC) an apostrophe is used to denote the start of a comment. (Note: As a comment character in MS BASIC, the apostrophe is in most cases an abbreviation of the REM statement, which can be appended to the end of almost any line with a colon (:). The cases where the apostrophe is not an abbreviation for REM would be those where the apostrophe is allowed but a REM statement is not. Note that there are also cases of the reverse constraint; for example, in QuickBASIC, a comment at the end of a DATA statement line cannot start with an apostrophe but must use : REM.) In the Lisp family of programming languages, an apostrophe is shorthand for the quote operator. In Rust, in addition to being used to delimit a character literal, an apostrophe can start an explicit lifetime.

== See also ==
- Apologetic apostrophe – Modern Scots orthography
- Backtick
- Caron ("Hacek")
- Contraction (grammar)
- Genitive case
- International Apostrophe Day
- Modifier letter double apostrophe
- Possessive case

== Notes and references ==
=== Bibliography ===
- Truss, Lynne (2003). Eats, Shoots & Leaves: The Zero Tolerance Approach to Punctuation. London: Profile Books. ISBN 1861976127.
