= James Bentley =

James Bentley may refer to:

- James Bentley (Eureka Rebellion), Australian hotelier and owner of Bentley's Hotel, and prime suspect of the murder of James Scobie, which led to the Eureka Rebellion
- James Bentley (author) (1937–2000), English author
- James Bentley (actor) (born 1992), English actor
- James Bentley (rugby league) (born 1996), Ireland international rugby league footballer
- James L. Bentley (1927–2003), American politician; Comptroller General of Georgia
- James C. Bentley (1903–1984), Canadian racehorse trainer
- Jim Bentley (born 1976), English footballer
