= United States Board on Geographic Names =

US geographic naming government agency

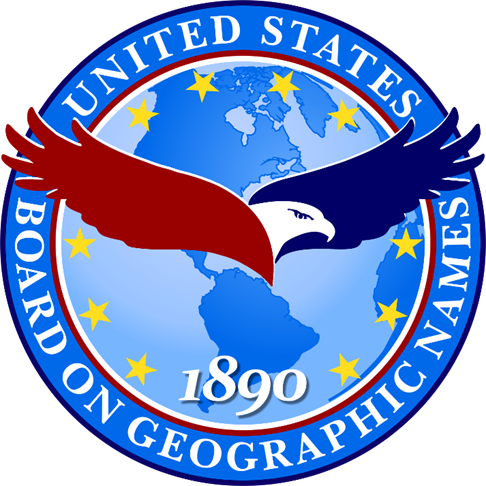

Board overview
- Formed: September 4, 1890; 136 years ago (first form); 1945 (second form)
- Board executives: Marcus Allsup, Chair; Mike Tischler, Vice-Chair
- Parent department: United States Department of the Interior
- Website: www.usgs.gov/us-board-on-geographic-names

The United States Board on Geographic Names (BGN) is a federal body operating under the United States secretary of the interior. The purpose of the board is to establish and maintain uniform usage of geographic names throughout the federal government of the United States.

== History ==
Following the American Civil War, more and more American settlers began moving westward, prompting the U.S. federal government to pursue some sort of consistency for referencing landmarks on maps and in official documents. As such, on January 8, 1890, Thomas Corwin Mendenhall, superintendent of the United States Coast and Geodetic Survey Office, wrote to 10 noted geographers "to suggest the organization of a Board made up of representatives from the different Government services interested, to which may be referred any disputed question of geographical orthography." President Benjamin Harrison signed executive order 28 on September 4, 1890, establishing the Board on Geographical Names. "To this Board shall be referred all unsettled questions concerning geographic names. The decisions of the Board are to be accepted [by federal departments] as the standard authority for such matters." The board was given authority to resolve all unsettled questions concerning geographic names. Decisions of the board were accepted as binding by all departments and agencies of the federal government.

In 1906, the board's powers were expanded by President Theodore Roosevelt from establishing consistency to being responsible for standardizing geographic names for use across the federal government.

The board has since undergone several name changes.

In 1934, President Franklin D. Roosevelt dissolved the board and transferred its responsibilities directly to the Department of the Interior. Shortly after the end of World War II congress reversed this decision and restored the board.

The Advisory Committee on Antarctic Names was established in 1943 as the Special Committee on Antarctic Names (SCAN). In 1963, the Advisory Committee on Undersea Features was started for standardization of names of undersea features.

Its present form derives from a 1947 law, Public Law 80-242.

In the 1960s and 1970s, the board pursued a policy to eliminate the use of derogatory terms related to Japanese and Black people.

Deb Haaland, U.S. secretary of the interior under the Biden administration, used the board to eliminate what she considered "offensive" and "racist" names such as changing the name of Mount Evans to Mount Blue Sky due to its namesake's, John Evans participation in the 1864 Sand Creek massacre or the removal of the word "squaw" from nearly 650 place names on U.S. federal lands as part of an effort to reckon with the nation's racist past.

The Board was assigned notable provisions of the 2025 executive order Restoring Names That Honor American Greatness during the second presidency of Donald Trump. Donald Trump also issued an executive order in 2026 ordering the Board to modify the Geographic Names Information System to change all references to "Lake Ontario" to instead reference "Lake America", as well as ordering the Board to provide "guidance" to ensure all references across the United States federal government also change.

== Operation ==
The 1969 BGN publication Decisions on Geographic Names in the United States stated the agency's chief purpose as:

[Names are] submitted for decisions to the Board on Geographical names by individuals, private organizations, or government agencies. It is the Board's responsibility to render formal decisions on new names, proposed changes in names, and names which are in conflict. [The decisions] define the spellings and applications of the names for use on maps and other publications of Federal agencies

The board has developed principles, policies, and procedures governing the use of domestic and foreign geographic names, including underseas. The BGN also deals with names of geographical features in Antarctica via its Advisory Committee on Antarctic Names.

The Geographic Names Information System, developed by the BGN in cooperation with the US Geological Survey, includes topographic map names and bibliographic references. The names of books and historic maps which confirm the feature or place name are cited. Variant names, alternatives to official federal names for a feature, are also recorded.

The BGN has members from six federal departments as well as the Central Intelligence Agency, the US Government Publishing Office, the Library of Congress, and the US Postal Service. The BGN rules on hundreds of naming decisions annually and stores over two million geographical records in its databases at geonames.usgs.gov. State and local governments and private mapping organizations usually follow the BGN's decisions.

The BGN has an executive committee and two permanent committees with full authority: the 10- to 15-member Domestic Names Committee and the 8- to 10-member Foreign Names Committee. Both comprise government employees only. Each maintains its own database.

The BGN does not create place names but responds to proposals for names from federal agencies; state, local, and tribal governments; and the public. Any person or organization, public or private, may make inquiries or request the board to render formal decisions on proposed new names, proposed name changes, or names that are in conflict. Generally, the BGN defers federal name use to comply with local usage. There are a few exceptions. For example, in rare cases where a locally used name is very offensive, the BGN may decide against adoption of the local name for federal use.

=== Special situations ===
The BGN does not translate terms, but instead accurately uses foreign names in the Roman alphabet. For non-Roman languages, the BGN uses transliteration systems or creates them for less well-known languages.

The BGN does not recognize the use of the possessive apostrophe and has only granted an exception five times during its history, including one for Martha's Vineyard, Massachusetts. (Note: Apart from Martha's Vineyard: Carlos Elmer's Joshua View in Arizona; Clark's Mountain in Oregon; Ike's Point in New Jersey; and John E's Pond in Rhode Island.)

In federal mapping and names collection efforts, there is often a phase lag where a delay occurs in adoption of a locally used name. Sometimes the delay is several decades. Volunteers in the Earth Science Corps are used to assist the US Geological Survey in collecting names of geographic features.

== Other authorities ==
- The United States Census Bureau defines census designated places, which are a subset of locations in the Geographic Names Information System.
- The names of post offices have historically been used to back up claims about the name of a community. US Postal Service Publication 28 gives standards for addressing mail. In this publication, the Postal Service defines two-letter state abbreviations, street identifiers such as boulevard (BLVD) and street (ST), and secondary identifiers such as suite (STE).

== Publications ==
The BGN currently publishes names on its website. In the past, the BGN issued its decisions in various publications under different titles at different intervals with various information included. In 1933, the BGN published a significant consolidated report of all decisions from 1890 to 1932 in its Sixth Report of the United States Geographic Board 1890–1932. For many years, the BGN published a quarterly report under the title Decisions on Geographic Names.

== See also ==
- BGN/PCGN romanization, a system for rendering geographic names in other writing systems into the Latin alphabet
- Composite Gazetteer of Antarctica
- Denali–Mount McKinley naming dispute
- Name of Pittsburgh
- Henry Gannett, "Father of the Quadrangle Map"
- Geographical Names Board of Canada
- Geographical Names Board of New South Wales
- BGN/PCGN romanization systems
- NGA Geographic Names Server
