= Sauce Périgueux =

Savory sauces

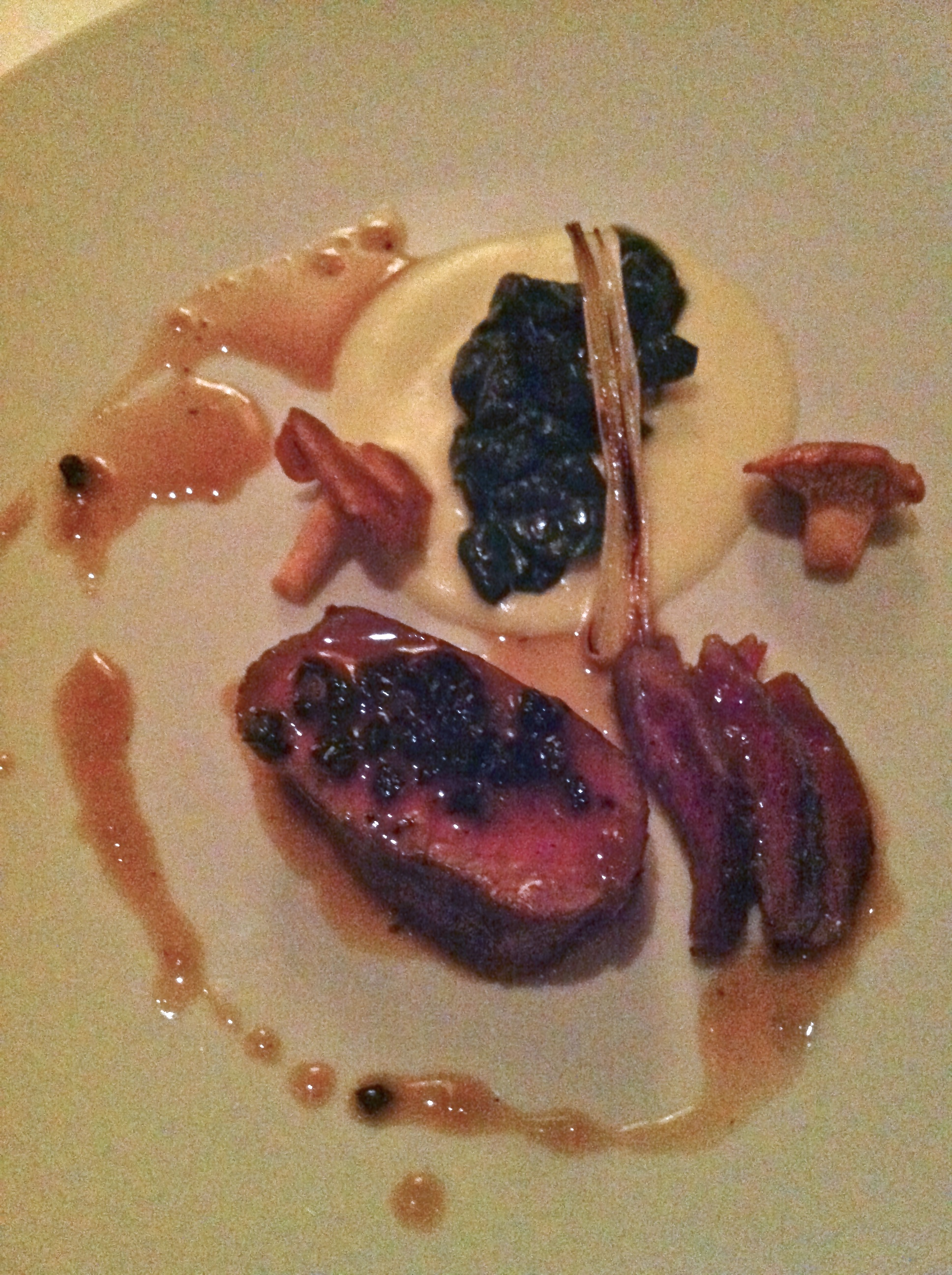
Rib steak, spring onion and smoked potato with sauce périgueux

Sauce Périgueux and its derivative Sauce Périgourdine, named after the city of Périgueux, capital of the Périgord region of France, are savoury sauces. Their principal ingredients are madeira and truffles.

== Background ==
Périgord in western France is noted for its truffles. A sauce Périgord, made of vegetables, ham or bacon, and mushrooms, sometimes with truffle peelings, is named after the region. The more elaborate sauce Périgueux is mentioned frequently in the recipes of Marie-Antoine Carême from the late 18th and early 19th centuries. Carême calls for the sauce to be served with birds including chicken, thrush, and pheasant, and fish including lemon sole, whiting, and salmon.

The author James Bentley calls sauce Périgueux, "an essential ingredient of many dishes and part of the repertoire of every French chef". He comments that it is often mistakenly called Dordogne sauce, "which obscures its origins in the capital of Périgord".

== Ingredients and use ==
In L'art de la cuisine française, Carême's collected recipes, the ingredients of the sauce are not listed, but Auguste Escoffier, in his 1934 book Ma Cuisine, specifies a demi-glace finished with madeira, and chopped truffles. He recommends the sauce as an accompaniment to eggs; crépinettes of mutton, lamb or chicken; poussin; boudin blanc; saddle of hare; young turkey; and pheasant. Alternatives to madeira are mentioned in Gustav Carlin's 1889 Le cuisinier moderne, which suggests champagne, and in James Bentley's 1986 Life and Food in the Dordogne, which replaces madeira with white wine and cognac.

Sauce Périgueux is the classic accompaniment to a Tournedos Rossini. Some modern recipes use tinned truffles: among the writers calling for these are Elizabeth David in French Provincial Cooking (1960) and Simone Beck, Louisette Bertholle and Julia Child in Mastering the Art of French Cooking (1961). Beck and her colleagues recommend the sauce as an accompaniment to fillet of beef, fresh foie gras, ham, veal, egg dishes and timbales.

Sauce Périgourdine is a derivative of sauce Périgueux and differs only in that the latter is finished with chopped truffles and the former with truffles cut into miniature globes or with whole slices of truffle.

== Sources ==
- Beck, Simone; Louisette Bertholle; Julia Child (2012) [1961]. Mastering the Art of French Cooking, Volume One. London: Particular. ISBN 978-0-241-95339-6.
- Bentley, James (1986). Life and Food in the Dordogne. London: Weidenfeld and Nicolson. ISBN 978-0-297-78725-9.
- Carême, Marie-Antoine (1847). L'art de la cuisine française au dix-neuviême siêcle. Paris: Comptoir des Imprimeurs-Unis. OCLC 969509254.
- David, Elizabeth (2002) [1960]. French Provincial Cooking (fourth ed.). London: Folio Society. OCLC 8093497113.
- Escoffier, Auguste (1934). Ma Cuisine. Paris: Flamarion. OCLC 3974541.
- Garlin, Gustave (1889). Le cuisinier moderne, ou, Les secrets de l'art culinaire (second ed.). Paris: Garnier frères. OCLC 834392993.
- Peterson, James (2017). Sauces (fourth ed.). Boston and New York: Houghton Mifflin Harcourt. ISBN 978-0-544-81982-5.
