= Scudder Falls Bridge =

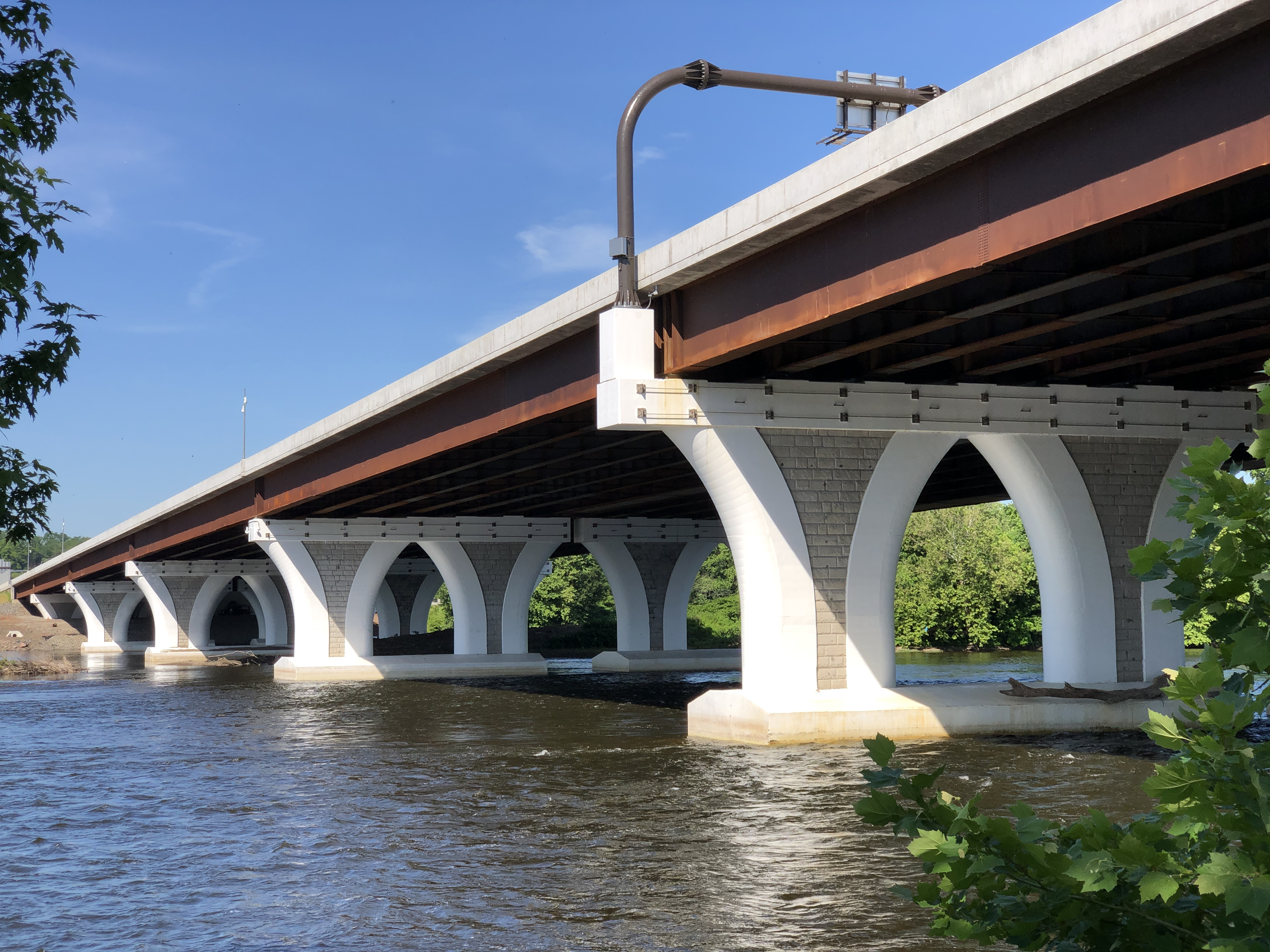
- The Scudder Falls Bridge in 2022, six months after being declared substantially complete
- Coordinates: 40°15′31″N 74°50′50″W
- Carries: 7 lanes of I-295
- Crosses: Delaware River
- Locale: Lower Makefield Township, Bucks County, Pennsylvania and Scudders Falls, Ewing Township, Mercer County, New Jersey
- Official name: Scudder Falls Toll Supported Bridge (original); Scudder Falls Toll Bridge (replacement)
- Maintained by: Delaware River Joint Toll Bridge Commission

Characteristics
- Design: Plate girder bridge (original); Box girder bridge (replacement)
- Total length: 1,740 feet (530 m)
- Width: 60 feet (18 m)
- Longest span: 180 feet (55 m)

History
- Opened: June 22, 1961 (original span); July 10, 2019 (new upstream span), August 18, 2021 (new downstream span)
- Closed: July 24, 2019 (original span)

Statistics
- Daily traffic: 52,200
- Toll: Westbound (New Jersey to Pennsylvania): $5.00 toll-by-plate for cars $2.00 E-ZPass for cars

Location
- Interactive map of Scudder Falls Bridge

The Scudder Falls Bridge is a toll bridge that carries Interstate 295 (I-295) over the Delaware River, connecting Lower Makefield Township in Bucks County, Pennsylvania, with the Scudders Falls section of Ewing Township in Mercer County, New Jersey, United States. It is maintained by the Delaware River Joint Toll Bridge Commission (DRJTBC). The original bridge was a plate girder bridge constructed from 1958 to 1961, and the current structure is a box-girder bridge that partially opened in 2019 and was substantially complete in 2021. Previously, the bridge was a toll-free crossing. However, this changed on July 14, 2019, when an all-electronic toll was levied for Pennsylvania-bound traffic; the toll can be paid using E-ZPass or Toll-by-Plate.

A $534 million replacement project for the bridge was completed, which involved widening I-295 in the area from four lanes to eight, and reconstruction of the interchanges at both ends of the bridge. The first span of the new bridge opened to Pennsylvania-bound traffic on July 10, 2019. New Jersey-bound traffic was moved onto the new span on July 24, 2019, and demolition of the old span began afterwards. The downstream span was opened to New Jersey-bound traffic on August 18, 2021. As well, a shared-use path for bicycle and foot-traffic opened on November 16, 2021.

== Name ==
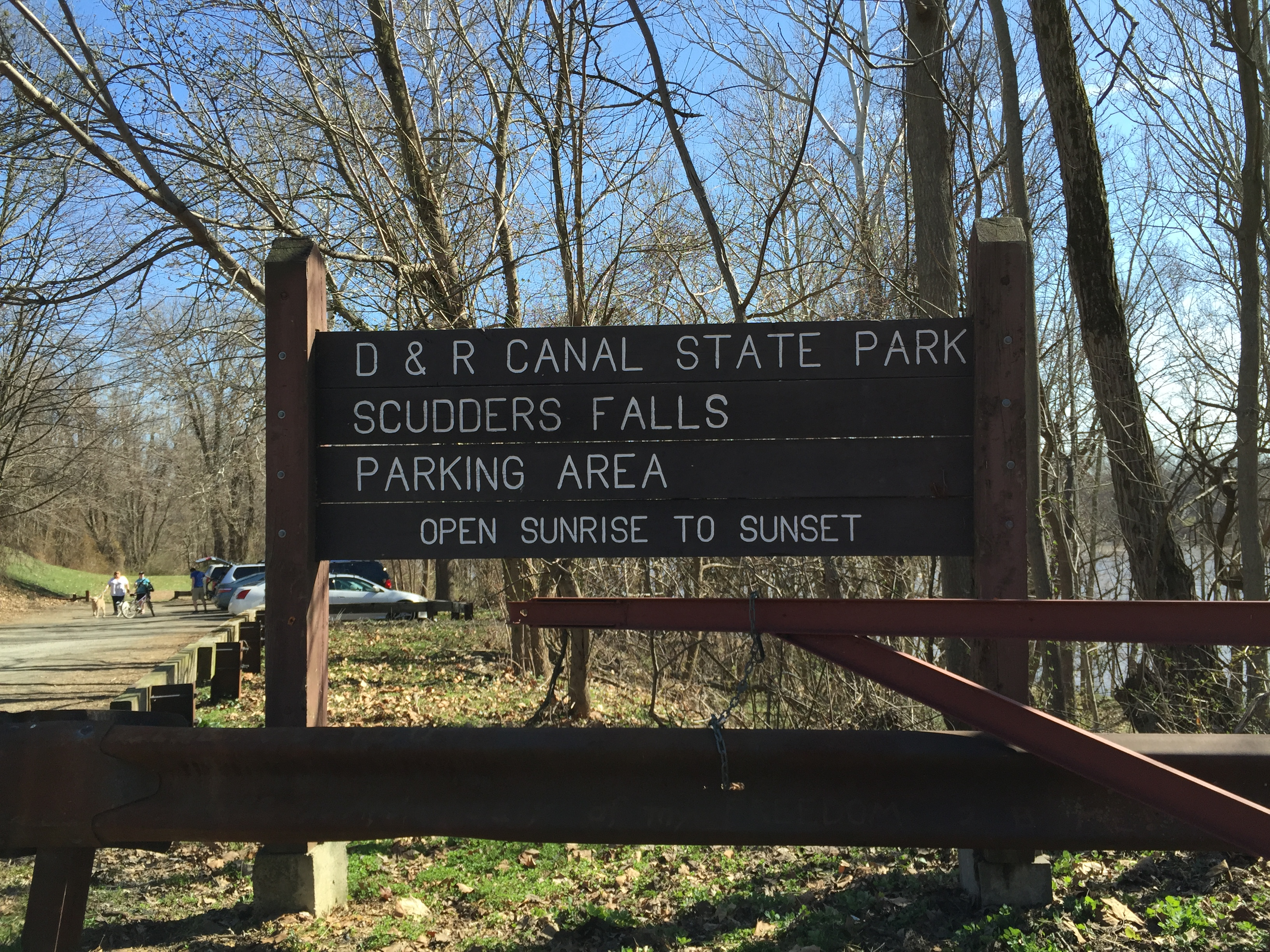
Entrance to Scudders Falls access in New Jersey - note name indicated as Scudders, with an s at the end, a slight difference from the official bridge name

The Scudder Falls Bridge derives its name from Richard Betts Scudder, who according to the Long Island Genealogy Surname Database, died in 1754 at "Scudder's Falls, Hunterdon County" (portions of Mercer County were part of Hunterdon County until 1838). One of Richard Scudder's ancestors from Kent, England, was named Henry Skudder. The k in the surname apparently became a c at some point in time, helping to give the falls and modern-day bridge its name. The "falls" (really just an area of rapids) are located about 1/2 mile north of the bridge, and the entrance to the Delaware and Raritan Canal State Park just north of the bridge is signed as the "Scudders Falls" unit. The extra s at the end of "Scudders" was dropped to make pronunciation of the bridge's name easier.

== Original bridge ==
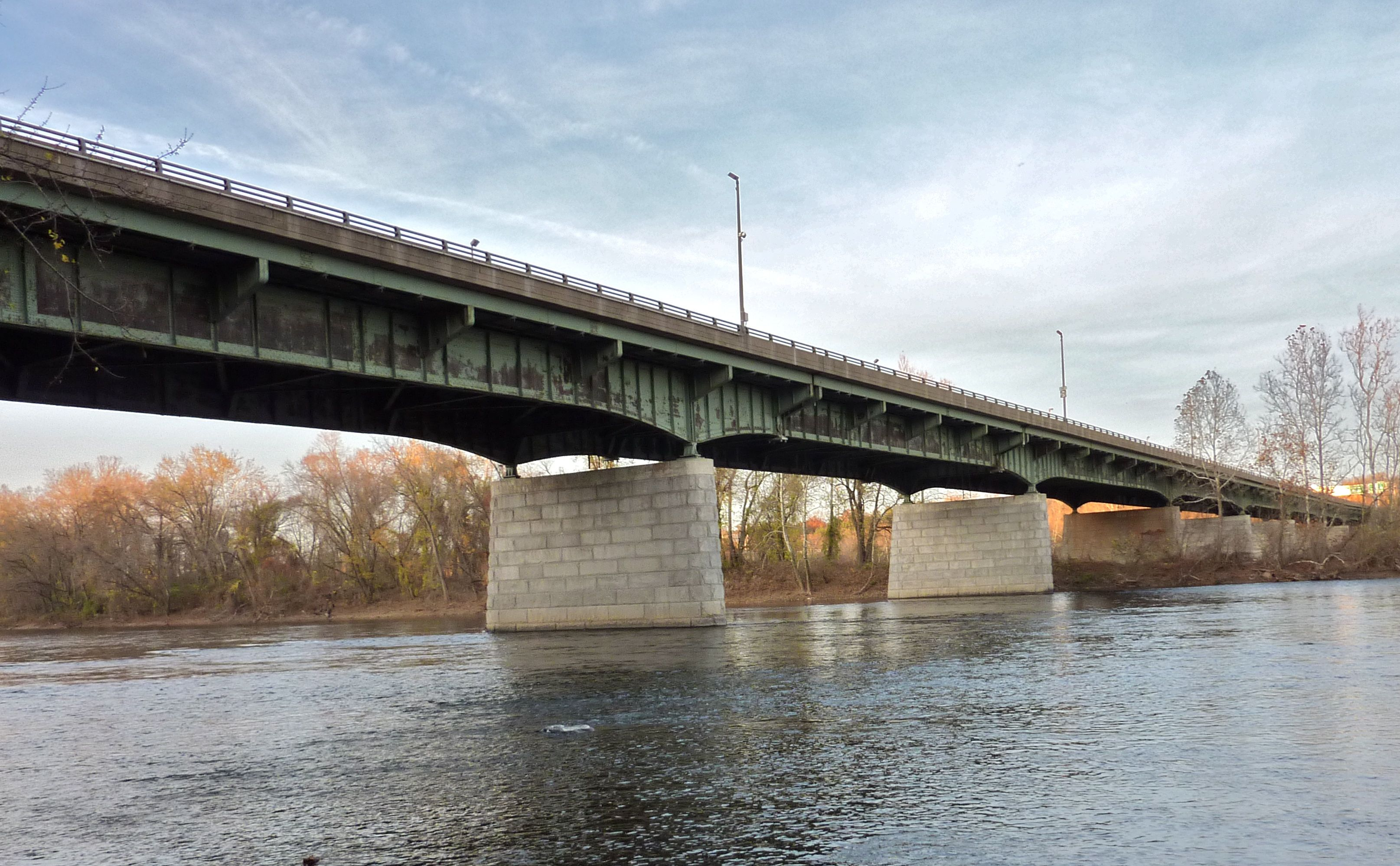
The original Scudder Falls Bridge in 2009

Following the destruction of the Yardley–Wilburtha Bridge in the August flood of 1955, plans were made to build a new bridge about 1.3 miles (2.1 km) north of the old site. The DRJTBC was responsible for the construction of the bridge, while New Jersey and Pennsylvania built the approaches to each side. Because the bridge was not originally part of the Interstate Highway System, the cost of construction was not 90% covered by the federal government. Instead, they covered 50% of the cost of the new span, while New Jersey and Pennsylvania paid the remaining 50% of the total bill, as with an ordinary U.S. Highway route.

In April 1958, the location of the future Scudder Falls Bridge was approved with little opposition. Construction, overseen by the DRJTBC, began in May of the same year and was completed in 1959. The new bridge, which had cost $8.4 million, opened to traffic on June 22, 1961. The Yardley-Wilburtha Bridge was rebuilt as a temporary crossing before the Scudder Falls Bridge began being built. It was completely torn down in 1961 when the Scudder Falls Bridge opened. The bridge was built using two-span continuous steel-plate girders. Its two end spans were each 150 feet (46 m) long, while each of the eight middle spans measured 180 feet (55 m). The bridge consisted of a roadway 48 feet (15 m) wide, split into four twelve-foot lanes. Opposing traffic was separated by a Jersey barrier. The bridge's total length was 1,740 feet (530 m). The Scudder Falls Bridge originally carried I-95 over the Delaware River. In March 2018, I-95 was renumbered to I-295 across the bridge as part of the Pennsylvania Turnpike/Interstate 95 Interchange Project that completed the gap in I-95.

== Replacement bridge ==
Starting in 2003, the DRJTBC began working on plans to replace the bridge, improve the safety and traffic flow of its two immediately adjoining interchanges (Taylorsville Road in Pennsylvania and Route 29 in New Jersey), and widen the Pennsylvania approach to the bridge (from four lanes to six). The project was deemed necessary because despite only being 42 years old, the original configurations of the bridge, interchanges and roadways suffered from numerous inadequacies. Design standards called for, at minimum, the addition of an inside shoulder 3 feet (0.91 m) wide (adding 6 feet (1.8 m) to its original width) and an outside shoulder 12 feet (3.7 m) wide (adding 24 feet (7.3 m) to its original width). The closely spaced interchanges on both ends of the bridge required the addition of acceleration and deceleration lanes (the Commission refers to them as "auxiliary lanes"), of which there were previously none.

According to the DRJTBC's 2002 Southerly Crossings Corridor Study, the Scudder Falls Bridge carried roughly 55,000 vehicles per day (traffic counts have increased since then), well beyond the design load of 40,000 vehicles per day. By 2030, traffic volumes were expected to increase by 35%, the equivalent of 19,000 additional vehicles. This amount of traffic would require two to perhaps four additional travel lanes (24 to 48 additional feet of roadway width).

Also mentioned by the 2002 study is that Scudder Falls Bridge had been given a Level of Service (LOS) grade of "F" during peak rush hours and afternoons. This grade denotes the worst service conditions and the highest congestion rate. At times other than brief rush hour delays, traffic traveling the bridge was relatively light. The condition of the bridge had also been a growing concern in the following years. Even though routine inspections had not revealed any serious structural problems, the bridge, at over 50 years old, was past the end of its structural service life. The bridge was also similar in design to the Mianus River Bridge in Greenwich, Connecticut, which suffered a fatal collapse in 1983, further inflating concerns about the structural integrity of the old bridge.

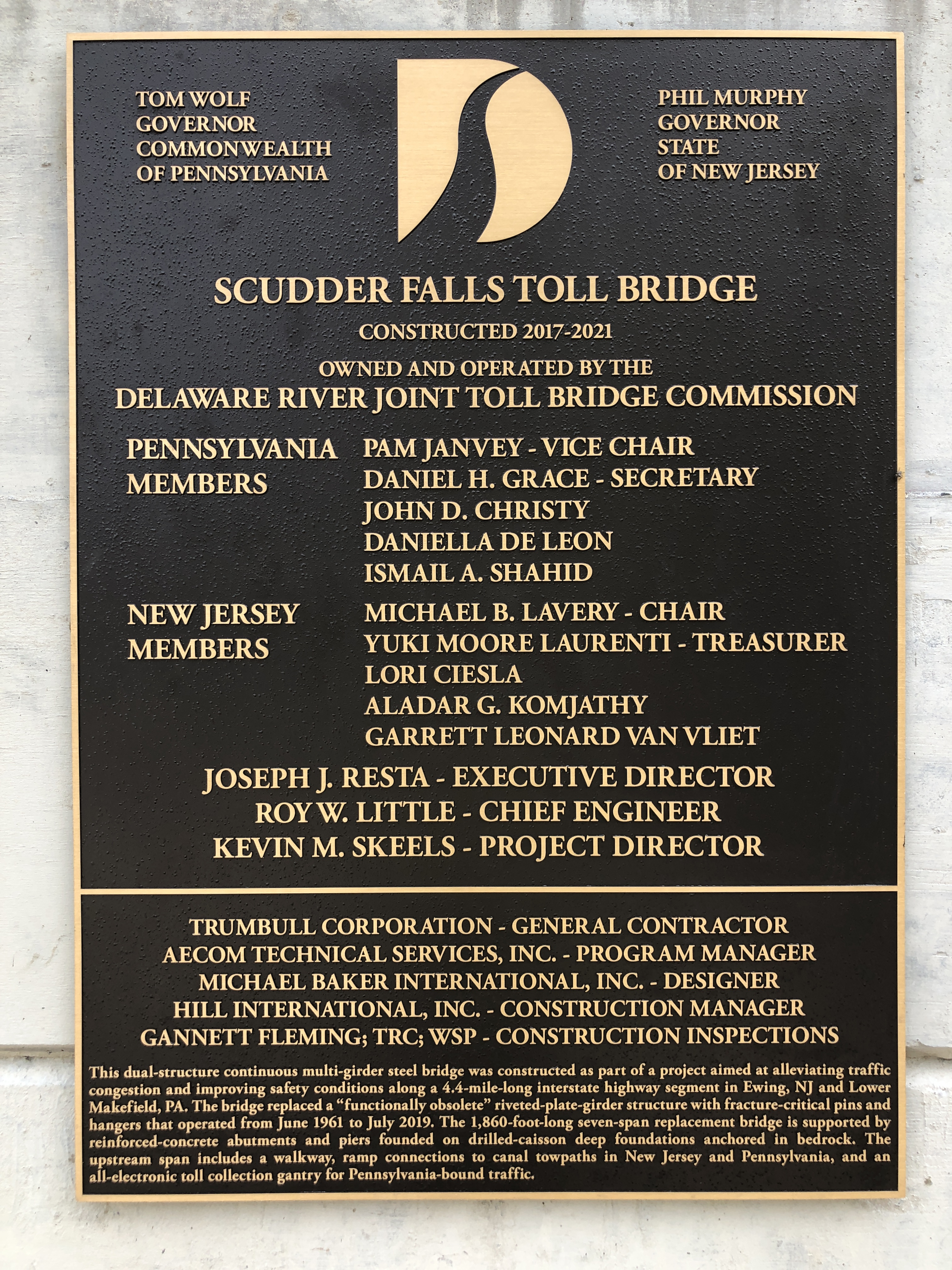
Plaque describing the replacement bridge

The replacement bridge consists of six through-travel lanes and three auxiliary lanes (two in the New Jersey-bound direction and one in the Pennsylvania-bound direction) to handle traffic accelerating onto the bridge or decelerating off of the bridge at the two closely spaced adjoining interchanges. It also has shoulders to handle vehicle breakdowns and emergencies, with the two inside shoulders being wide enough to handle proposed regional bus-rapid transit service. A bicycle/pedestrian facility was added to the upstream side of the new bridge. On July 10, 2019, the upstream span of the new bridge opened to Pennsylvania-bound traffic. New Jersey-bound traffic remained on the original span until July 24, after which demolition of the original span began and construction of the new downstream span began; it opened just over two years later on August 18, 2021.

To help finance this multi-faceted improvement project, the DRJTBC voted in late December 2009 to establish tolling at the crossing. Tolls were implemented on July 14, 2019, four days after the new bridge span opened to traffic. Tolls are collected from traffic crossing into Pennsylvania, with an all-electronic toll gantry consisting of E-ZPass transponder readers and high-resolution cameras (no cash toll booths) constructed on the bridge. The DRJTBC has stated that the introduction of cashless tolling at the bridge is necessary to help finance its capital program, of which the multi-faceted Scudder Falls Bridge Replacement Project would be its largest single construction initiative in its 75-year history. The commission is funded solely by tolls collected at its eight current toll bridges; it receives no gasoline tax revenues or state or federal support. Commission executives have stated that it would be unfair to have the project financed solely by motorists using its other toll bridges, individuals who have been subsidizing the Scudder Falls facility already for more than two decades.

The shared-use path on the bridge is the only one of its kind across the Delaware River crossing from Pennsylvania-to-New Jersey, in that it allows cyclists to ride across without dismounting. This bridge also restores pedestrian/cyclist access to cross the bridge in the Yardley area, which had been previously unavailable since the 1955 destruction of the Yardley-Wilburtha bridge.

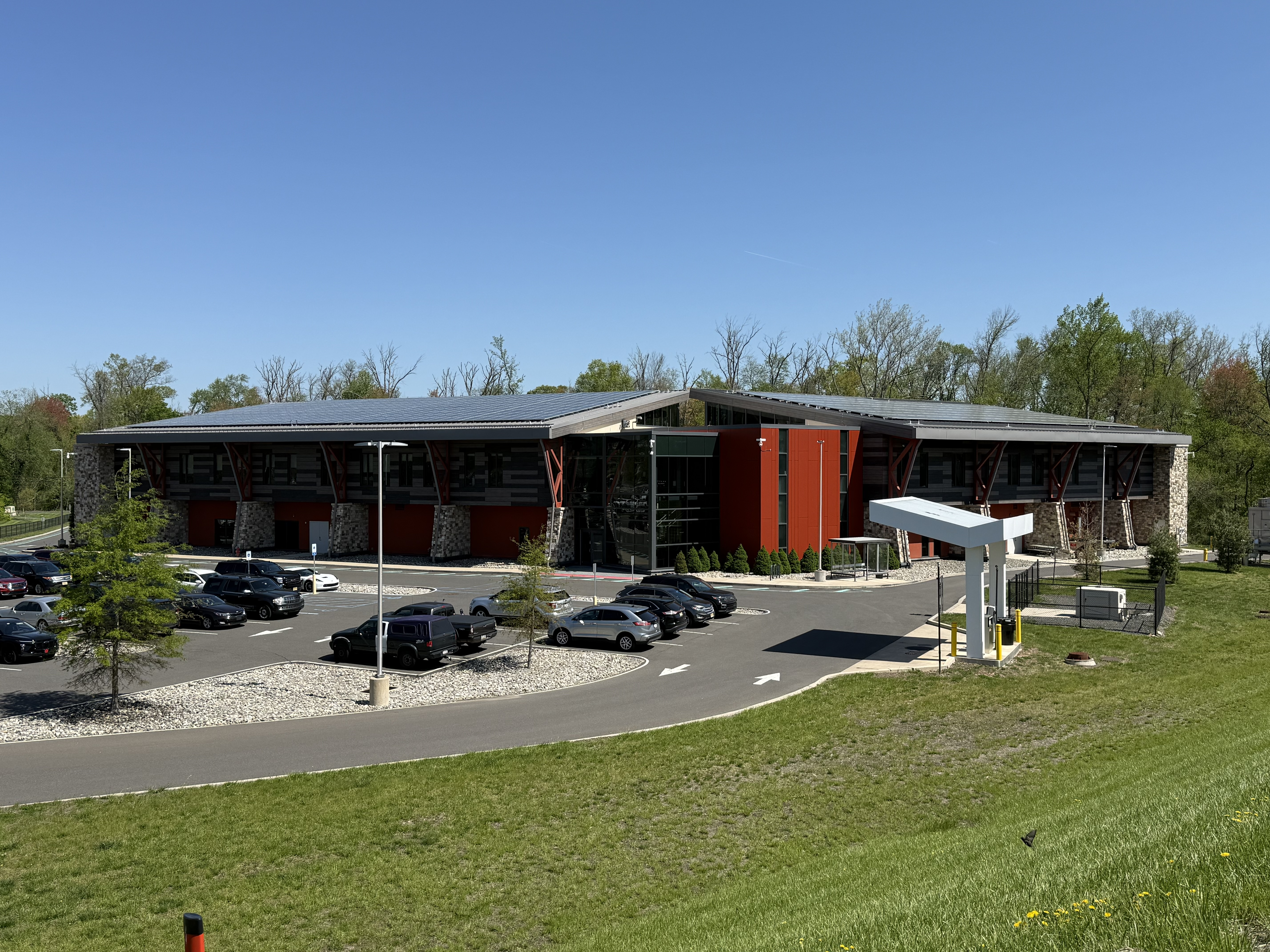
DRJTBC headquarters are adjacent to the PA terminus of the bridge

In addition to the construction of a new bridge, the DRJTBC simultaneously constructed a new headquarters building. It is adjacent to the Pennsylvania terminus of the bridge.

== See also ==
- List of crossings of the Delaware River
