= Clark's Mountain =

Mountain in Clatsop County, Oregon, United States

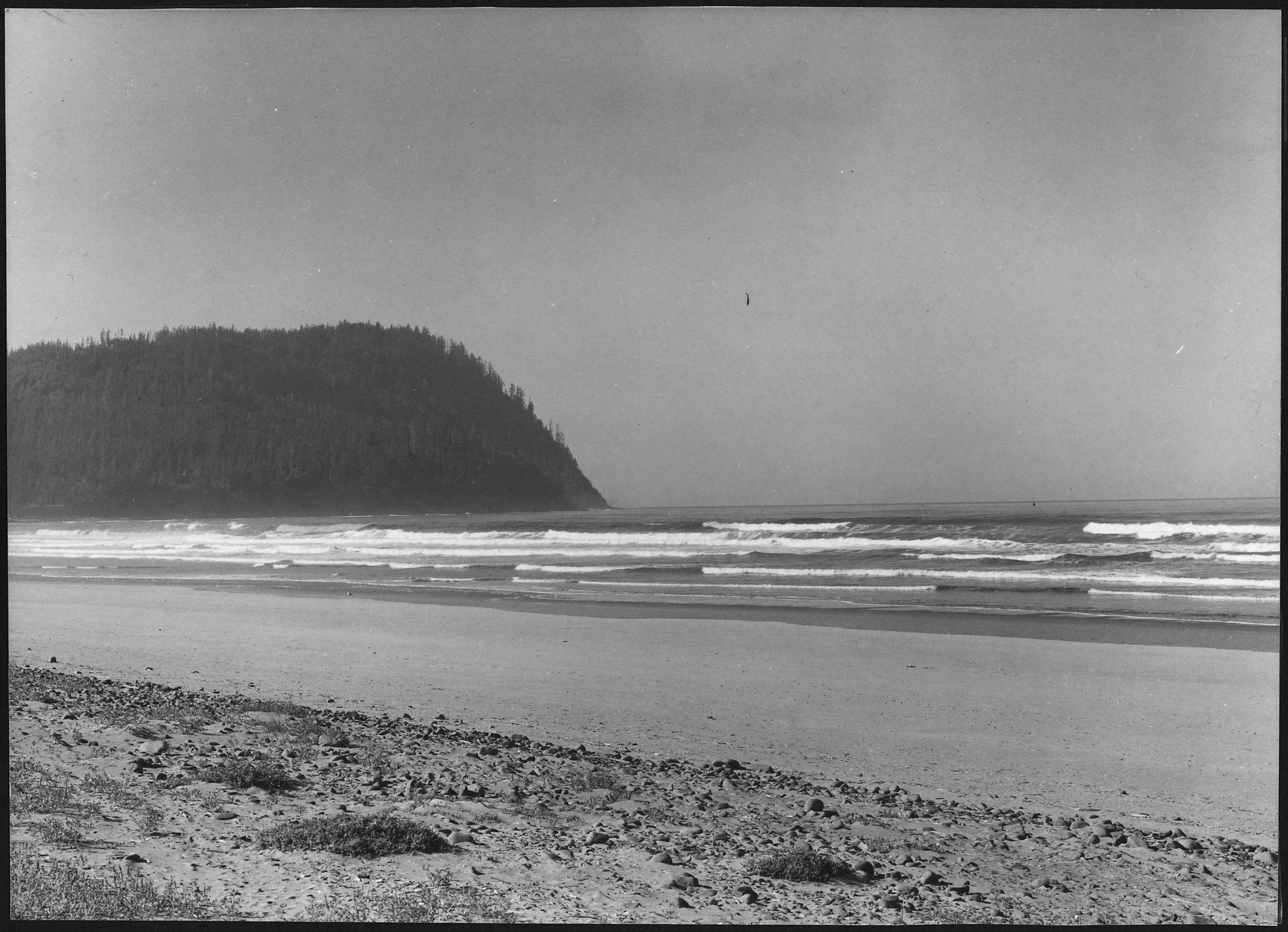
- Clark's Mountain and Tillamook Head as seen from Seaside (George A. Grant, 1938)

Highest point
- Elevation: 1,165 ft (355 m)
- Coordinates: 45.9611303°N 123.9689026°W

Geography
- Location within Oregon
- Country: United States
- State: Oregon
- County: Clatsop County

Clark's Mountain is a summit in Clatsop County, Oregon. It is named for William Clark (1770–1838), who during the Lewis and Clark Expedition, likely viewed the summit from the vicinity of Cape Disappointment. It is located in Ecola State Park, 2.4 km (1.5 mi) northeast of Tillamook Head, 0.8 km (0.5 mi) south of West Point, 3.5 km (2.2 mi) southwest of Seaside, Oregon. The summit has an elevation of 355 metres (1,165 ft).

The Lewis & Clark Discovery Trail, part of the greater Oregon Coast Trail, goes over the summit.

== History ==
Clark and Meriwether Lewis first described what would be known as Tillamook Head and Clark's Mountain on 18 November 1805. On 8 January 1806, Clark took a trip over the summit, where he remarked, "...from this point I beheld the grandest and most pleasing prospects which my eyes ever surveyed..." Lewis originally named the summit "Clark's Mountain and Point of View." However, the name didn't catch on and the entire promontory was later called Tillamook Head.

In the early 2000s, the Oregon Chapter of the Lewis and Clark Trail Heritage Foundation campaigned to officially name the highest point on Tillamook Head "Clark's Mountain". The Oregon Geographic Names Board approved its use in 2001, followed by the U.S. Board of Geographic Names in 2002. Clark's Mountain is notable for being one of five American federally-recognized place names with a possessive apostrophe. (Note: The other four instances being Martha's Vineyard, Massachusetts; Carlos Elmer's Joshua View, Arizona; Ike's Point, New Jersey; and John E's Pond, Rhode Island.) The U.S. Board on Geographic Names allowed the apostrophe as a way to emphasize the tribute to William Clark.
