= Mind your Ps and Qs =

English idiom about minding manners

Mind your P's and Q's is an English language expression meaning "mind your manners", "mind your language", "be on your best behaviour", or "watch what you're doing".

Attempts at explaining the origin of the phrase go back to the mid-19th century. One explanation favoured in a letter to the editors of Notes and Queries dated 1851, is a literal interpretation of the saying, regarding possible confusion between the lowercase letters p and q in schoolwork or typesetting. This is mentioned in the 3rd edition Oxford English Dictionary, but the dictionary considers the explanation unlikely since "the chronology of the senses would argue against this, and no such connotation is evident in the earliest quotations" and says that the origin of the expression is unknown.

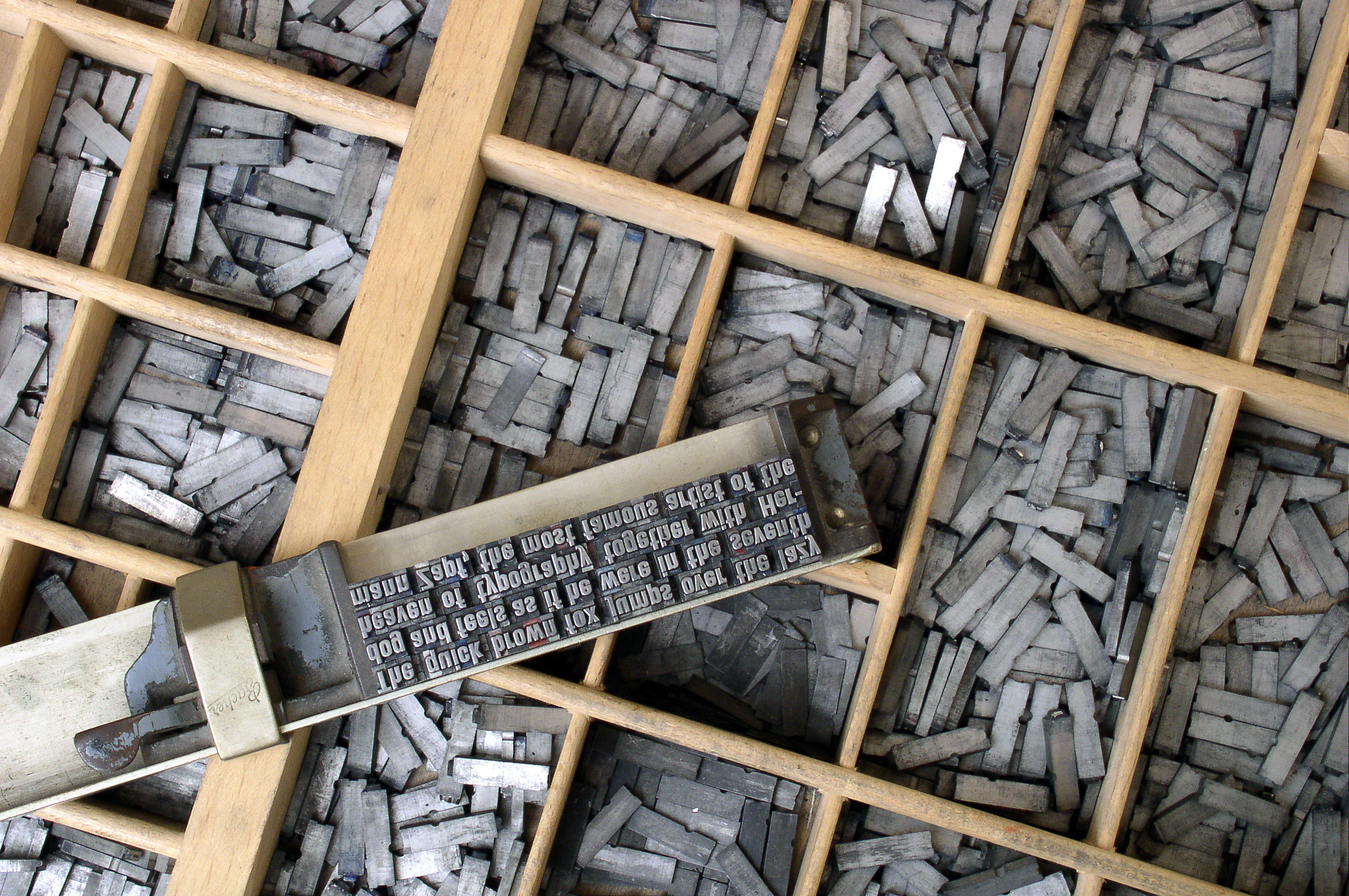
Movable type p's and q's could be easily mistaken, especially as they are mirror-reversed from the printed result.

According to Michael Quinion, "investigations by the Oxford English Dictionary in 2007 when revising the entry turned up early examples of the use of Ps and Qs to mean learning the alphabet. The first is in a poem by Charles Churchill, published in 1763: 'On all occasions next the chair / He stands for service of the Mayor, / And to instruct him how to use / His As and Bs, and Ps and Qs.' The conclusion must be that this is the true origin."

When pupils were taught the lowercase alphabet, the position of the vertical line before or after the circle represented different letters: d and b, p and q. Pupils also had to mind the order of letters in the alphabet (p comes before q). As noted by W. D. Henkle in Educational Notes and Queries in 1876, in this sense the phrase should be "note your p's and q's" (lowercase), because the distinction of majuscule P and Q does not pose a problem.

Nevertheless, a number of alternative explanations have been considered plausible. One suggests "Ps and Qs" is short for "pleases" and "thank-yous", the latter syllables pronounced like the letter "Q". Another proposal is from the English pubs and taverns of the 17th century: bartenders would keep watch over the pints and quarts consumed by the patrons, telling them to "mind their Ps and Qs". This may also have been a reminder to bartenders not to confuse the two units, written as "p" and "q" on the tally slate.

Other origin stories, some considered "fanciful", could come from French instructions to mind one's pieds (feet) and queues (wigs) while dancing. However, there is no French translation for this expression. Another is with regard to 18th century sailors, who were reminded to pay attention to their peas (pea coat) and queues (pony tail). Another proposal concerns the use of Norman French in medieval England; as the English dialect of the 11th century had no letter q, one must watch one's usage with the French Norman conquerors.

Quinion cites an apparently related expression of pee and kew for "highest quality" used in 17th-century English: "The Oxford English Dictionary has a citation from Rowlands' Knave of Harts of 1612: 'Bring in a quart of Maligo, right true: And looke, you Rogue, that it be Pee and Kew'", possibly the initials of "Prime Quality" (folk etymology).

Another folk etymology comes from the pubs in Scotland and England. The reason sometimes given is that Scottish pints and quarts were about three times larger than English pints and quarts, it was important to notice because the mug for a Scottish pint was similar (but still larger) than an English quart.
