= John E's Pond =

- John E's Tug Hole
- Location within Rhode Island
- Location: Washington County, Rhode Island
- Coordinates: 41.1558408°N 71.5597239°W
- Type: Lake
- Basin countries: United States
- Surface elevation: 46 metres (151 ft)

John E's Pond or John E's Tug Hole is a pond on Block Island in Washington County, Rhode Island, United States.

The land around the pond is partially conserved by The Nature Conservancy and by the Block Island Land Trust. The pond is part of a larger network of wet bogs. Historically, it was seasonally dammed to facilitate the harvest of peat and ice.

John E's Pond is used recreationally for swimming, fishing, and boating. It is habitat for birds like the northern harrier, and woody shrubs such as sweet pepperbush are common around the margins.

== Etymology ==
John E's Pond is notable for being one of five American federally-recognized place names with a possessive apostrophe. (Note: The other four instances being Martha's Vineyard, Massachusetts; Carlos Elmer's Joshua View, Arizona; Clark's Mountain, Oregon; and Ike's Point, New Jersey.) When the name was officialized in 1963, the U.S. Board on Geographic Names allowed the apostrophe to prevent the name from being read as John "Ess" Pond.

The word tug in the term tug hole archaically means peat, which was the main source of fuel on Block Island for early settlers. Tug hole is a local term for ponds that were used for harvesting peat (known colloquially as tugging).
