= Carlos Elmer =

American writer and photographer (1920–1993)

Carlos Hall Elmer (22 July 1920 – 22 May 1993) was an American writer and a photographer based out of Kingman, Arizona. He sought to capture "the wide look of Arizona" in his images.

== Early life and education ==
Elmer was born in Washington, D.C., on 22 July 1920. He relocated to Kingman, Arizona, as a child in 1926. He earned a degree from UCLA in 1947.

== Career ==
Elmer went on to become an Air Force photographer in the Pacific Theater of WWII. He served with the Seventh Air Force from 1942 to 1945. After his discharge from the military in 1946, he worked as a civilian at the United States Naval Ordnance Test Station from 1947 to 1957.

Elmer was employed as a salesman until 1972. He continued to build his photography collections and began to publish his images. Over his career, he published nine books containing his work. He collaborated often with the magazine Arizona Highways. In 1989, he was awarded a Lifetime Achievement Award by the Kingman Area Chamber of Commerce.

== Personal life ==
Elmer had two children with his wife Wilma.

== Legacy ==
Carlos Elmer's Joshua View is a named slope in Mohave County, Arizona, west of Grapevine Mesa. It eponymizes Elmer's legacy of photographing Joshua trees in Mohave County. Carlos Elmer's Joshua View is unique in that it is one of few American place names with a possessive apostrophe. (Note: The other four instances being Martha's Vineyard, Massachusetts; Clark's Mountain, Oregon; Ike's Point, New Jersey; and John E's Pond, Rhode Island.) It was successfully argued by the Arizona State Board on Geographic and Historic Names that having three given names in a row (Carlos, Elmer, and Joshua) would lead to confusion without the punctuation mark.

In 1998, the city of Kingman began hosting the Carlos Elmer Photography Contest. Elmer has a permanent exhibit of his work in Kingman.
