= James Bentley (author) =

James Bentley (9 March 1937 – 26 December 2000) was an English author and former Anglican parish priest.

Bentley was born in Bolton, Lancashire, England in 1937. He was educated at Bolton School before going up to Merton College, Oxford to read history in 1956. He worked as an Anglican parish priest and a research fellow at the University of Sussex before becoming a full-time freelance author and journalist in 1982. In 1961, he married Audrey Winifred Darlington; they had two daughters.

Bentley spent many years living in France's Dordogne region, developing deep expertise in the area. He authored a guidebook and gazetteer that included scholarly essays on the region's troubadours, prehistoric cave art, and culinary traditions. His separate book on the food of the region remains an excellent guide and the recipes he proposes are reliable.

Bentley died in hospital in Saumur, France in December 2000 after suffering extensive injuries in a collision near his home.

== Works ==
- Ritualism and Politics in Victorian Britain
- Martin Niemoller
- Oberammergau and the Passion Play
- Secrets of Mount Sinai
- Between Marx and Christ, Verso, London, 1982 ISBN 0-86091-748-7
- Restless Bones: The Story of Relics, Constable, London, 1985 ISBN 0-09-465850-1
- A guide to the Dordogne, Viking, London, 1985, ISBN 0-670-80090-2
- Life and Food in the Dordogne, New Amsterdam Books, New York, 1986 ISBN 0-941533-04-2
- Albert Schweitzer: The Enigma, HarperCollins, 1992
