= Phonetic symbols in Unicode =

Unicode supports several phonetic scripts and notation systems through its existing scripts and the addition of extra blocks with phonetic characters. These phonetic characters are derived from an existing script, usually Latin, Greek or Cyrillic. Apart from the International Phonetic Alphabet (IPA), extensions to the IPA and obsolete and nonstandard IPA symbols, these blocks also contain characters from the Uralic Phonetic Alphabet and the Americanist Phonetic Alphabet.

== Phonetic scripts ==
The International Phonetic Alphabet (IPA) makes use of letters from other writing systems as most phonetic scripts do. IPA notably uses Latin, Greek and Cyrillic characters. Combining diacritics also add meaning to the phonetic text. Finally, these phonetic alphabets make use of modifier letters, that are specially constructed for phonetic meaning. A "modifier letter" is strictly intended not as an independent grapheme but as a modification of the preceding character resulting in a distinct grapheme, notably in the context of the International Phonetic Alphabet. For example, ʰ should not occur on its own but modifies the preceding or following symbol. Thus, tʰ is a single IPA symbol, distinct from t. In practice, however, several of these "modifier letters" are also used as full graphemes, e.g. ʿ as transliterating Semitic ayin or Hawaiian ʻokina, or ˚ transliterating Abkhaz ә.

== From IPA to Unicode ==
=== Consonants ===
The following tables indicates the Unicode code point sequences for phonemes as used in the International Phonetic Alphabet. A bold code point indicates that the Unicode chart provides an application note such as "voiced retroflex lateral" for U+026D ɭ LATIN SMALL LETTER L WITH RETROFLEX HOOK. An entry in bold italics indicates the character name itself refers to a phoneme such as U+0298 ʘ LATIN LETTER BILABIAL CLICK

Basic Latin/Greek Latin extended IPA extension

	Bilabial		Labiodental		Dental		Alveolar		Postalveolar		Retroflex		Labialized palatal		Postalveolar-velar
Plosive	p U+0070	b U+0062	p̪ U+0070 U+032A	b̪ U+0062 U+032A	t̪ U+0074 U+032A	d̪ U+0064 U+032A	t U+0074	d U+0064			ʈ U+0288	ɖ U+0256			
Implosive	ɓ̥ U+0253 U+0325	ɓ U+0253				ɗ̪ U+0257 U+032A		ɗ U+0257				ᶑ U+1D91			
Ejective	pʼ U+0070 U+02BC				t̪ʼ U+0074 U+032A U+02BC		tʼ U+0074 U+02BC				ʈʼ U+0288 U+02BC				
Nasal	m̥ U+006D U+0325	m U+006D	ɱ̊ U+0271 U+030A	ɱ U+0271	n̪̊ U+006E U+032A U+030A	n̪ U+006E U+032A	n̥ U+006E U+0325	n U+006E			ɳ̊ U+0273 U+030A	ɳ U+0273			
Trill		ʙ U+0299					r̥ U+0072 U+0325	r U+0072				*			
Tap or flap		ⱱ̟ U+2C71 U+031F		ⱱ U+2C71				ɾ U+027E				ɽ U+027D			
Lateral flap								ɺ U+027A				𝼈 U+1DF08			
Fricative	ɸ U+0278	β U+03B2	f U+0066	v U+0076	θ U+03B8	ð U+00F0	s U+0073	z U+007A	ʃ U+0283	ʒ U+0292	ʂ U+0282	ʐ U+0290			ɧ U+0267
Lateral fricative							ɬ U+026C	ɮ U+026E			ꞎ U+A78E				
Ejective fricative							sʼ U+0073 U+02BC		ʃʼ U+0283 U+02BC						
Ejective lateral fricative							ɬʼ U+026C U+02BC								
Percussive	ʬ U+02AC				ʭ U+02AD										
Approximant	β̞̊ U+03B2 U+031E U+030A	β̞ U+03B2 U+031E	ʋ̥ U+028B U+0325	ʋ U+028B		ð̞ U+00F0 U+031E	ɹ̥ U+0279 U+0325	ɹ U+0279			ɻ̊ U+027B U+030A	ɻ U+027B	ɥ̊ U+0265 U+030A	ɥ U+0265	
Lateral approximant							l̥ U+006C U+0325	l U+006C				ɭ U+026D			
Click consonant	ʘ U+0298				ǀ U+01C0		ǃ U+01C3		ǃ / ǂ U+01C3 / U+01C2		𝼊 U+1DF0A				
Lateral click					*		ǁ U+01C1								

	Alveolo-palatal		Palatal		Labial-velar		Velar		Uvular		Pharyngeal		Epiglottal		Glottal	
Plosive	ȶ U+0236	ȡ U+0221	c U+0063	ɟ U+025F	k͡p U+006B U+0361 U+0070	ɡ͡b U+0261 U+0361 U+0062	k U+006B	ɡ U+0261	q U+0071	ɢ U+0262			ʡ U+02A1		ʔ U+0294	
Implosive				ʄ U+0284				ɠ U+0260		ʛ U+029B						
Ejective			cʼ U+0063 U+02BC				kʼ U+006B U+02BC		qʼ U+0071 U+02BC							
Nasal		ȵ U+0235		ɲ U+0272		ŋ͡m U+014B U+0361 U+006D		ŋ U+014B		ɴ U+0274						
Trill										ʀ U+0280				*		
Tap or flap														*		
Lateral flap				*				*								
Fricative	ɕ U+0255	ʑ U+0291	ç U+00E7	ʝ U+029D			x U+0078	ɣ U+0263	χ U+03C7	ʁ U+0281	ħ U+0127	ʕ U+0295	ʜ U+029C	ʢ U+02A2	h U+0068	ɦ U+0266
Approximant				j U+006A	ʍ U+028D	w U+0077		ɰ U+0270								
Lateral approximant		ȴ U+0234		ʎ U+028E				ʟ U+029F								

=== Vowels ===
The following figures depict the phonetic vowels and their Unicode / UCS code points, arranged to represent the phonetic vowel trapezium. Vowels appearing in pairs in the figure to the right indicate rounded and unrounded variations respectively. Again, characters with Unicode names referring to phonemes are indicated by bold text. Those with explicit application notes are indicated by bold italic text. Those from borrowed unchanged from another script (Latin, Greek or Cyrillic) are indicated by italics. Before and after a bullet are the unrounded • rounded vowels.

Unicode code points for phonetic vowels
	Front	Central	Back
Close	i • y U+0069 • U+0079	ɨ • ʉ U+0268 • U+0289	ɯ • u U+026F • U+0075
Near-close	ɪ • ʏ U+026A • U+028F		• ʊ • U+028A
Close-mid	e • ø U+0065 • U+00F8	ɘ • ɵ U+0258 • U+0275	ɤ • o U+0264 • U+006F
Mid		ə U+0259	
Open-mid	ɛ • œ U+025B • U+0153	ɜ • ɞ U+025C • U+025E	ʌ • ɔ U+028C • U+0254
Near-open	æ • U+00E6 •	ɐ U+0250	
Open	a • ɶ U+0061 • U+0276		ɑ • ɒ U+0251 • U+0252

=== Diacritics ===
Diacritics may be encoded as either modifier (e.g. ˳) or combining (e.g. ◌̥) characters.

Voiceless	Breathy Voiced	Dental	Syllabic
˳ • ◌̥ U+02F3 • U+0325	◌̤ U+0324	◌͏̪ U+032A	ˌ • ◌̩ U+02CC • U+0329
Voiced	Creaky Voiced	Apical	Non-syllabic
ˬ • ◌̬ U+02EC • U+032C	˷ • ◌̰ U+02F7 • U+0330	˽ • ◌̺ U+02FD • U+033A	◌͏̯ U+032F
Aspirated	Linguolabial	Laminal	More Rounded
ʰ U+02B0	◌͏̼ U+033C	◌͏̻ U+033B	˒ • ◌̹ U+02D2 • U+0339
Labialized	Nasalized	Palatalized	Less Rounded
ʷ U+02B7	◌̃ U+0303	ʲ U+02B2	˓ • ◌̜ U+02D3 • U+031C
Advanced	Nasal release	Centralized	Velarized
˖ • ◌̟ U+02D6 • U+031F	ⁿ U+207F	¨ • ◌̈ U+00A8^{[1]} • U+0308	ˠ U+02E0
Retracted	Lateral release	Mid-Centralized	Pharyngealized
˗ • ◌̠ U+02D7 • U+0320	ˡ U+02E1	˟ • ◌̽ U+02DF • U+033D	ˤ U+02E4
Advanced Tongue Root	No audible release	Raised	Velarized or Pharyngealized
꭪ • ◌̘ U+AB6A • U+0318	˺ • ◌̚ U+02FA • U+031A	˔ • ◌̝ U+02D4 • U+031D	◌̴ U+0334
Retracted Tongue Root	Rhoticity	Lowered	Lengthened
꭫ • ◌̙ U+AB6B • U+0319	˞ U+02DE	˕ • ◌̞ U+02D5 • U+031E	**ː** U+02D0
Notes 1.The codepoint refers to diaeresis, which takes up space but is not a Spacing Modifier Letter.

== Unicode blocks ==
- Basic Latin (0020–007E), IPA example: Palatal approximant (006A)
- Latin-1 Supplement (0080–00FF), IPA example: Voiceless palatal fricative (00E7)
- Latin Extended-A (0100–017F), IPA example: Velar nasal (014B)
- Latin Extended-B (0180–024F), IPA example: Tenuis dental click (01C0 0287)
- IPA Extensions (0250–02AF), IPA example: Voiced retroflex fricative (0290)
- Spacing Modifier Letters (02B0–02FF), IPA example: Palatal ejective (0063 02BC)
- Combining Diacritical Marks (0300–036F), IPA example: Voiceless bilabial nasal (006D 0325)
- Greek and Coptic (0370–03FF), IPA example: Voiceless dental fricative (03B8)
- Combining Diacritical Marks Extended (1AB0–1AFF), extIPA examples: combining parentheses
- Combining Diacritical Marks Supplement (1DC0–1DFF), IPA example: Rising-falling contour tone (1DC8)
- General Punctuation (2000–206F), IPA example: Linking (absence of a break) (203F)
- Superscripts and Subscripts (2070–209F), IPA example: Nasal release (207F)
- Arrows (2190–21FF), IPA example: Global rise (2197)
- Latin Extended-C (2C60–2C7F), IPA example: Labiodental flap (2C71)
- Modifier Tone Letters (A700–A71F), IPA example: Upstep (A71B)
- Phonetic Extensions (1D00–1D7F)
- Phonetic Extensions Supplement (1D80–1DBF)
- Latin Extended-D (A720–A7FF), extIPA example: Voiceless retroflex lateral fricative (A78E)
- Latin Extended-E (AB30–AB6F), IPA example: Voiceless retroflex affricate ligature (AB67)
- Latin Extended-F (10780–107BF)
- Latin Extended-G (1DF00–1DFFF), extIPA example: Voiceless palatal lateral fricative (1DF06)

== Unicode blocks with many phonetic symbols ==
Six Unicode blocks contain many phonetic symbols:

=== IPA Extensions (U+0250–02AF) ===
IPA Extensions^{[1]} Official Unicode Consortium code chart (PDF)
	0	1	2	3	4	5	6	7	8	9	A	B	C	D	E	F
U+025x	ɐ	ɑ	ɒ	ɓ	ɔ	ɕ	ɖ	ɗ	ɘ	ə	ɚ	ɛ	ɜ	ɝ	ɞ	ɟ
U+026x	ɠ	ɡ	ɢ	ɣ	ɤ	ɥ	ɦ	ɧ	ɨ	ɩ	ɪ	ɫ	ɬ	ɭ	ɮ	ɯ
U+027x	ɰ	ɱ	ɲ	ɳ	ɴ	ɵ	ɶ	ɷ	ɸ	ɹ	ɺ	ɻ	ɼ	ɽ	ɾ	ɿ
U+028x	ʀ	ʁ	ʂ	ʃ	ʄ	ʅ	ʆ	ʇ	ʈ	ʉ	ʊ	ʋ	ʌ	ʍ	ʎ	ʏ
U+029x	ʐ	ʑ	ʒ	ʓ	ʔ	ʕ	ʖ	ʗ	ʘ	ʙ	ʚ	ʛ	ʜ	ʝ	ʞ	ʟ
U+02Ax	ʠ	ʡ	ʢ	ʣ	ʤ	ʥ	ʦ	ʧ	ʨ	ʩ	ʪ	ʫ	ʬ	ʭ	ʮ	ʯ
Notes 1.As of Unicode version 18.0

=== Spacing Modifier Letters (U+02B0–02FF) ===
The characters in the "Spacing Modifier Letters" block are intended as forming a unity with the preceding letter (which they "modify"). E.g. the character U+02B0 ʰ MODIFIER LETTER SMALL H isn't intended simply as a superscript h (^{h}), but as the mark of aspiration placed after the letter being aspirated, as in pʰ "aspirated voiceless bilabial plosive". The block contains:

- Latin superscript modifier letters: (U+02B0–U+02B8): ʰ aspiration; ʱ breathy voice, murmured; ʲ palatalization; ʳ ʴ ʵ ʶ r-coloring or r-offglides; ʷ labialization; ʸ palatalization, Americanist usage for U+02B2
- Miscellaneous phonetic modifiers: (U+02B9–U+02D7): ʹ ʺ ʻ ʼ ʽ ʾ ʿ ˀ ˁ ˂ ˃ ˄ ˅ ˆ ˇ ˈ ˉ ˊ ˋ ˌ ˍ ˎ ˏ ː ˑ ˒ ˓ ˔ ˕ ˖ ˗
- Spacing clones of diacritics: (U+02D8–U+02DD): ˘ breve; ˙ dot above; ˚ ring above; ˛ ogonek; ˜ small tilde; ˝ double acute accent
- Additions based on 1989 IPA: (U+02DE–U+02E4): ˞ ˟ ˠ ˡ ˢ ˣ ˤ
- Tone letters: (U+02E5–U+02E9): ˥ ˦ ˧ ˨ ˩
- Extended Bopomofo tone marks: U+02EA ˪ MODIFIER LETTER YIN DEPARTING TONE MARK; U+02EB ˫ MODIFIER LETTER YANG DEPARTING TONE MARK
- IPA modifiers: U+02EC ˬ MODIFIER LETTER VOICING, unaspirated
- Other modifier letters: U+02EE ˮ MODIFIER LETTER DOUBLE APOSTROPHE for Nenets
- Uralic Phonetic Alphabet (UPA) modifiers: (U+02EF–U+02FF): ˯ ˰ ˱ ˲ ˳ ˴ ˵ ˶ ˷ ˸ ˹ ˺ ˻ ˼ ˽ ˾ ˿

Spacing Modifier Letters^{[1]} Official Unicode Consortium code chart (PDF)
	0	1	2	3	4	5	6	7	8	9	A	B	C	D	E	F
U+02Bx	ʰ	ʱ	ʲ	ʳ	ʴ	ʵ	ʶ	ʷ	ʸ	ʹ	ʺ	ʻ	ʼ	ʽ	ʾ	ʿ
U+02Cx	ˀ	ˁ	˂	˃	˄	˅	ˆ	ˇ	ˈ	ˉ	ˊ	ˋ	ˌ	ˍ	ˎ	ˏ
U+02Dx	ː	ˑ	˒	˓	˔	˕	˖	˗	˘	˙	˚	˛	˜	˝	˞	˟
U+02Ex	ˠ	ˡ	ˢ	ˣ	ˤ	˥	˦	˧	˨	˩	˪	˫	ˬ	˭	ˮ	˯
U+02Fx	˰	˱	˲	˳	˴	˵	˶	˷	˸	˹	˺	˻	˼	˽	˾	˿
Notes 1.As of Unicode version 18.0

=== Phonetic Extensions (U+1D00–1D7F) ===
This block, together with Phonetic Extensions Supplement below, contains:

- Small capitals ɢ ɪ ɴ ɶ ʀ ʏ ʙ ʜ ʟ
- Turned small letters ɐ ɥ ɯ ɹ ɺ ɻ ʇ ʌ ʍ ʎ ʞ ʮ ʯ
- Extra small capitals ʁ ʛ ᴀ ᴁ ᴃ ᴄ ᴅ ᴆ ᴇ ᴊ ᴋ ᴌ ᴍ ᴎ ᴏ ᴐ ᴘ ᴙ ᴚ ᴛ ᴜ ᴠ ᴡ ᴢ ᴣ ᴦ ᴧ ᴨ ᴩ ᴪ
- Letters with palatal hooks ƫ ᶀ ᶁ ᶂ ᶃ ᶄ ᶅ ᶆ ᶇ ᶈ ᶉ ᶊ ᶋ ᶌ ᶍ ᶎ ᶪ ᶵ
- Letters with retroflex hooks ᶏ ᶐ ᶒ ᶓ ᶔ ᶕ ᶖ ᶗ ᶘ ᶙ ᶚ ᶩ ᶯ ᶼ

Phonetic Extensions^{[1]} Official Unicode Consortium code chart (PDF)
	0	1	2	3	4	5	6	7	8	9	A	B	C	D	E	F
U+1D0x	ᴀ	ᴁ	ᴂ	ᴃ	ᴄ	ᴅ	ᴆ	ᴇ	ᴈ	ᴉ	ᴊ	ᴋ	ᴌ	ᴍ	ᴎ	ᴏ
U+1D1x	ᴐ	ᴑ	ᴒ	ᴓ	ᴔ	ᴕ	ᴖ	ᴗ	ᴘ	ᴙ	ᴚ	ᴛ	ᴜ	ᴝ	ᴞ	ᴟ
U+1D2x	ᴠ	ᴡ	ᴢ	ᴣ	ᴤ	ᴥ	ᴦ	ᴧ	ᴨ	ᴩ	ᴪ	ᴫ	ᴬ	ᴭ	ᴮ	ᴯ
U+1D3x	ᴰ	ᴱ	ᴲ	ᴳ	ᴴ	ᴵ	ᴶ	ᴷ	ᴸ	ᴹ	ᴺ	ᴻ	ᴼ	ᴽ	ᴾ	ᴿ
U+1D4x	ᵀ	ᵁ	ᵂ	ᵃ	ᵄ	ᵅ	ᵆ	ᵇ	ᵈ	ᵉ	ᵊ	ᵋ	ᵌ	ᵍ	ᵎ	ᵏ
U+1D5x	ᵐ	ᵑ	ᵒ	ᵓ	ᵔ	ᵕ	ᵖ	ᵗ	ᵘ	ᵙ	ᵚ	ᵛ	ᵜ	ᵝ	ᵞ	ᵟ
U+1D6x	ᵠ	ᵡ	ᵢ	ᵣ	ᵤ	ᵥ	ᵦ	ᵧ	ᵨ	ᵩ	ᵪ	ᵫ	ᵬ	ᵭ	ᵮ	ᵯ
U+1D7x	ᵰ	ᵱ	ᵲ	ᵳ	ᵴ	ᵵ	ᵶ	ᵷ	ᵸ	ᵹ	ᵺ	ᵻ	ᵼ	ᵽ	ᵾ	ᵿ
Notes 1.As of Unicode version 18.0

=== Phonetic Extensions Supplement (U+1D80–1DBF) ===
Phonetic Extensions Supplement^{[1]} Official Unicode Consortium code chart (PDF)
	0	1	2	3	4	5	6	7	8	9	A	B	C	D	E	F
U+1D8x	ᶀ	ᶁ	ᶂ	ᶃ	ᶄ	ᶅ	ᶆ	ᶇ	ᶈ	ᶉ	ᶊ	ᶋ	ᶌ	ᶍ	ᶎ	ᶏ
U+1D9x	ᶐ	ᶑ	ᶒ	ᶓ	ᶔ	ᶕ	ᶖ	ᶗ	ᶘ	ᶙ	ᶚ	ᶛ	ᶜ	ᶝ	ᶞ	ᶟ
U+1DAx	ᶠ	ᶡ	ᶢ	ᶣ	ᶤ	ᶥ	ᶦ	ᶧ	ᶨ	ᶩ	ᶪ	ᶫ	ᶬ	ᶭ	ᶮ	ᶯ
U+1DBx	ᶰ	ᶱ	ᶲ	ᶳ	ᶴ	ᶵ	ᶶ	ᶷ	ᶸ	ᶹ	ᶺ	ᶻ	ᶼ	ᶽ	ᶾ	ᶿ
Notes 1.As of Unicode version 18.0

=== Modifier Tone Letters (U+A700–A71F) ===
Modifier Tone Letters^{[1]} Official Unicode Consortium code chart (PDF)
	0	1	2	3	4	5	6	7	8	9	A	B	C	D	E	F
U+A70x	꜀	꜁	꜂	꜃	꜄	꜅	꜆	꜇	꜈	꜉	꜊	꜋	꜌	꜍	꜎	꜏
U+A71x	꜐	꜑	꜒	꜓	꜔	꜕	꜖	ꜗ	ꜘ	ꜙ	ꜚ	ꜛ	ꜜ	ꜝ	ꜞ	ꜟ
Notes 1.As of Unicode version 18.0

=== Superscripts and Subscripts (U+2070–209F) ===
Superscripts and Subscripts^{[1]}^{[2]}^{[3]} Official Unicode Consortium code chart (PDF)
	0	1	2	3	4	5	6	7	8	9	A	B	C	D	E	F
U+207x	⁰	ⁱ			⁴	⁵	⁶	⁷	⁸	⁹	⁺	⁻	⁼	⁽	⁾	ⁿ
U+208x	₀	₁	₂	₃	₄	₅	₆	₇	₈	₉	₊	₋	₌	₍	₎	₏
U+209x	ₐ	ₑ	ₒ	ₓ	ₔ	ₕ	ₖ	ₗ	ₘ	ₙ	ₚ	ₛ	ₜ	₝	₞	₟
Notes 1.As of Unicode version 18.0 2.Grey areas indicate non-assigned code points 3.Refer to the Latin-1 Supplement Unicode block for characters ¹ (U+00B9), ² (U+00B2) and ³ (U+00B3)

== Input by selection from a screen ==
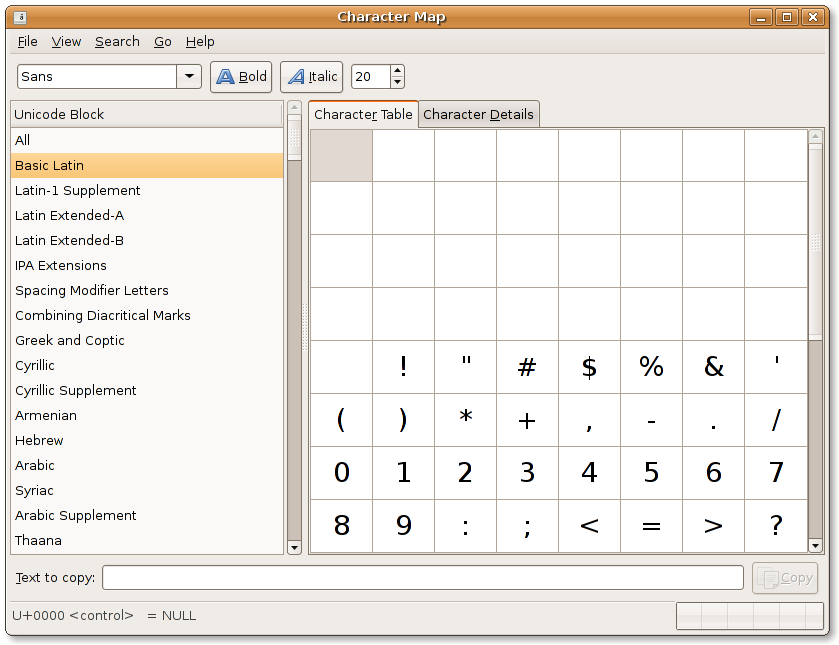
Applet for character selection

Many systems provide a way to select Unicode characters visually. ISO/IEC 14755 refers to this as a screen-selection entry method.

Microsoft Windows has provided a Unicode version of the Character Map program (find it by hitting ⊞ Win+R then type charmap then hit ↵ Enter) since version NT 4.0 – appearing in the consumer edition since XP. This is limited to characters in the Basic Multilingual Plane (BMP). Characters are searchable by Unicode character name, and the table can be limited to a particular code block. More advanced third-party tools of the same type are also available (a notable freeware example is BabelMap).

macOS provides a "character palette" with much the same functionality, along with searching by related characters, glyph tables in a font, etc. It can be enabled in the input menu in the menu bar under System Preferences → International → Input Menu (or System Preferences → Language and Text → Input Sources) or can be viewed under Edit → Emoji & Symbols in many programs.

Equivalent tools – such as gucharmap (GNOME) or kcharselect (KDE) – exist on most Linux desktop environments.

== See also ==
- Unicode symbols
- Universal Character Set characters
- Latin script in Unicode
- IPA

Place →	Labial					Coronal										Dorsal					Laryngeal			
Manner ↓	Bilabial		Labiodental		Linguolabial		Dental		Alveolar		Postalveolar		Retroflex		(Alveolo-)palatal		Velar		Uvular		Pharyngeal/epiglottal		Glottal	
Nasal	m̥	m	ɱ̊	ɱ		n̼	n̪̊	n̪	n̥	n	n̠̊	n̠	ɳ̊	ɳ	ɲ̊	ɲ	ŋ̊	ŋ	ɴ̥	ɴ				
Plosive	p	b	p̪	b̪	t̼	d̼	t̪	d̪	t	d			ʈ	ɖ	c	ɟ	k	ɡ	q	ɢ	ʡ		ʔ	
Sibilant affricate							t̪s̪	d̪z̪	ts	dz	t̠ʃ	d̠ʒ	tʂ	dʐ	tɕ	dʑ								
Non-sibilant affricate	pɸ	bβ	p̪f	b̪v			t̪θ	d̪ð	tɹ̝̊	dɹ̝	t̠ɹ̠̊˔	d̠ɹ̠˔			cç	ɟʝ	kx	ɡɣ	qχ	ɢʁ	ʡʜ	ʡʢ	ʔh	
Sibilant fricative							s̪	z̪	s	z	ʃ	ʒ	ʂ	ʐ	ɕ	ʑ								
Non-sibilant fricative	ɸ	β	f	v	θ̼	ð̼	θ	ð	θ̠	ð̠	ɹ̠̊˔	ɹ̠˔	ɻ̊˔	ɻ˔	ç	ʝ	x	ɣ	χ	ʁ	ħ	ʕ	h	ɦ
Approximant		β̞		ʋ				ð̞		ɹ		ɹ̠		ɻ		j		ɰ						˷
Tap/flap		ⱱ̟		ⱱ					ɾ̥	ɾ			ɽ̊	ɽ						ɢ̆		ʡ̆		
Trill	ʙ̥	ʙ							r̥	r		r̠	ɽ̊r̥	ɽr					ʀ̥	ʀ	ʜ	ʢ		
Lateral affricate									tɬ	dɮ			tꞎ	d𝼅	c𝼆	ɟʎ̝	k𝼄	ɡʟ̝						
Lateral fricative							ɬ̪		ɬ	ɮ			ꞎ	𝼅	𝼆	ʎ̝	𝼄	ʟ̝						
Lateral approximant								l̪	l̥	l		l̠	ɭ̊	ɭ	ʎ̥	ʎ	ʟ̥	ʟ		ʟ̠				
Lateral tap/flap									ɺ̥	ɺ			𝼈̊	𝼈		ʎ̆		ʟ̆						

		BL	LD	D	A	PA	RF	P	V	U
Implosive	Voiced	ɓ			ɗ		ᶑ	ʄ	ɠ	ʛ
Implosive	Voiceless	ɓ̥			ɗ̥		ᶑ̊	ʄ̊	ɠ̊	ʛ̥
Ejective	Stop	pʼ			tʼ		ʈʼ	cʼ	kʼ	qʼ
Ejective	Affricate		p̪fʼ	t̪θʼ	tsʼ	t̠ʃʼ	tʂʼ	tɕʼ	kxʼ	qχʼ
Ejective	Fricative	ɸʼ	fʼ	θʼ	sʼ	ʃʼ	ʂʼ	ɕʼ	xʼ	χʼ
Ejective	Lateral affricate				tɬʼ			c𝼆ʼ	k𝼄ʼ	q𝼄ʼ
Ejective	Lateral fricative				ɬʼ					
Click (top: velar; bottom: uvular)	Tenuis	kʘ qʘ		kǀ qǀ	kǃ qǃ		k𝼊 q𝼊	kǂ qǂ		
Click (top: velar; bottom: uvular)	Voiced	ɡʘ ɢʘ		ɡǀ ɢǀ	ɡǃ ɢǃ		ɡ𝼊 ɢ𝼊	ɡǂ ɢǂ		
Click (top: velar; bottom: uvular)	Nasal	ŋʘ ɴʘ		ŋǀ ɴǀ	ŋǃ ɴǃ		ŋ𝼊 ɴ𝼊	ŋǂ ɴǂ	ʞ	
Click (top: velar; bottom: uvular)	Tenuis lateral				kǁ qǁ					
Click (top: velar; bottom: uvular)	Voiced lateral				ɡǁ ɢǁ					
Click (top: velar; bottom: uvular)	Nasal lateral				ŋǁ ɴǁ					
