= L' =

L' (L + apostrophe), or Lʼ (L + modifier apostrophe) may represent:

- an abbreviated form of a French definite article
- the compose key sequence for Ĺ (L + acute accent)
- palatalised l, in Slavic notation

It looks similar to:

- Ľ (L + caron), a letter used in the Slovak alphabet and in some versions of the Ukrainian Latin alphabet
- ɬʼ, the International Phonetic Alphabet symbol for the alveolar lateral ejective fricative
- L′ (L + prime)
- Lʻ (L + ʻokina)
- Lʾ (L + right half ring)
- Lʿ (L + left half ring)
