= F' =

F' (F + apostrophe) may stand in for:

- Fʼ (F + modifier apostrophe), which represents:
  - the labiodental ejective fricative, in the International Phonetic Alphabet
  - palatalised f, in Slavic notation
- F′ (F + prime), often used in mathematical notation for the first derivative of a function
- F̀ (F + grave accent), used for transliterating the Cyrillic letter Fita
- Fʻ (F + ʻokina)
- Fʾ (F + right half ring)
- Fʿ (F + left half ring)
