= Semivowel =

Consonants with similar features to vowels

In phonetics and phonology, a semivowel, glide or semiconsonant is a sound that is phonetically similar to a vowel sound but functions as the syllable boundary, rather than as the nucleus of a syllable. Examples of semivowels in English are y and w in yes and west, respectively. Written /j w/ in IPA, y and w are near to the vowels ee and oo in seen and moon, written /iː uː/ in IPA. The term glide may alternatively refer to any type of transitional sound, rather than necessarily a semivowel.

== Classification ==
Non-syllabic

◌̯

◌̑

Encoding
- Entity (decimal): &#815;&#785;
- Unicode (hex): U+032F U+0311
Image

Semivowels form a subclass of approximants. Although "semivowel" and "approximant" are sometimes treated as synonymous, most authors use the term "semivowel" for a more restricted set; there is no universally agreed-upon definition, and the exact details may vary from author to author. For example, Ladefoged & Maddieson (1996) do not consider the labiodental approximant [ʋ] to be a semivowel (see spirant approximant). Semivowels may be distinguished from the rest of approximants via a feature of prolongability; while all other approximants are prolongable, semivowels are momentary, as prolonging them results instead in the formation of their vocalic equivalents ([j, w] → [i, u]).

Another ambiguity of terminology exists between the terms "semivowel" and "semiconsonant", which are also often treated as synonymous in English linguistic tradition, though the latter may be regarded as somewhat antiquated. However, in other linguistic traditions (such as Italian and Spanish), a distinction is made between the two terms. In these traditions, semivowels refer to non-syllabic vowel offglides (such as [i̯, u̯]) often found as partial components of syllable nuclei (such as in diphthongs), while semiconsonants refer to consonant onglides (such as [j, w]) often found in syllable onsets. An example demonstrating this difference can be observed in the interjections yay [ˈjei̯] and wow [ˈwau̯].

=== Transcription and coordinate vowels ===
In the International Phonetic Alphabet, the diacritic attached to non-syllabic vowel letters is an inverted breve placed below the symbol representing the vowel: U+032F ◌̯ COMBINING INVERTED BREVE BELOW. When there is no room for the inverted breve under a symbol, it may be written above, using U+0311 ◌̑ COMBINING INVERTED BREVE. Before 1989, non-syllabicity was represented by U+0306 ◌̆ COMBINING BREVE, which now stands for extra-shortness.

Additionally, there are dedicated symbols for four semivowels that correspond to the four close cardinal vowel sounds:

Semivowel (non-syllabic)	Vowel (syllabic)
[j] (palatal approximant)	[i] (close front unrounded vowel)
[ɥ] (labio-palatal approximant)	[y] (close front rounded vowel)
[ɰ] (velar approximant)	[ɯ] (close back unrounded vowel)
[w] (labiovelar approximant)	[u] (close back rounded vowel)

Some authors argue for the recognition of additional semivowels:

- The rhotic approximants ⟨ɹ⟩ and ⟨ɻ⟩, considered to be semivowels corresponding to r-colored vowels such as ⟨ɚ⟩ or ⟨ɝ⟩.
- The pharyngeal approximant ⟨ʕ̞⟩, considered to be the semivowel corresponding to the open back vowel ⟨ɑ⟩, which is noted to have distinct pharyngeal features in its articulation.
- The post-palatal approximants, or central semivowels, which may be written as ⟨j˗ ɥ˗ w̟⟩ (diacritics for advancing and retracting), ⟨ȷ̈ ɥ̈ ẅ⟩ (diacritics for centralization), or the para-IPA symbols ⟨ɉ ~~ɥ~~ ~~w~~⟩, considered to be corresponding to the unrounded ⟨ɨ⟩, compressed ⟨ÿ⟩, and protruded ⟨ʉ⟩ close central vowels, respectively.

== Contrast with vowels ==
Semivowels, by definition, contrast with vowels by being non-syllabic. In addition, they are usually shorter than vowels. In languages such as Amharic, Yoruba, and Zuni, semivowels are produced with a narrower constriction in the vocal tract than their corresponding vowels. Nevertheless, semivowels may be phonemically equivalent with vowels. For example, the English word fly can be considered either as an open syllable ending in a diphthong [flai̯] or as a closed syllable ending in a consonant [flaj].

It is unusual for a language to contrast a semivowel and a diphthong containing an equivalent vowel, but Romanian contrasts the diphthong /e̯a/ with /ja/, a perceptually similar approximant-vowel sequence. The diphthong is analyzed as a single segment, and the approximant-vowel sequence is analyzed as two separate segments.

In addition to phonological justifications for the distinction (such as the diphthong alternating with /e/ in singular-plural pairs), there are phonetic differences between the pair:

- /ja/ has a greater duration than /e̯a/
- The transition between the two elements is longer and faster for /ja/ than /e̯a/ with the former having a higher F2 onset (greater constriction of the articulators).

Although a phonological parallel exists between /o̯a/ and /wa/, the production and perception of phonetic contrasts between the two is much weaker, likely because of lower lexical load for /wa/, which is limited largely to loanwords from French, and speakers' difficulty in maintaining contrasts between two back rounded semivowels in comparison to front ones.

== See also ==
- Diphthong
- Hiatus (linguistics)
- List of phonetics topics
- Mater lectionis
- Syllabic consonant

== Sources ==
- Ball, Martin J. (2026). "1: What Are Approximants?". The Phonetics and Phonology of Approximants. Studies in Phonetics and Phonology. Toronto, Buffalo, London: University of Toronto Press. pp. 1–6. ISBN 9781487528867.
- Catford, J. C. (1982) [1977]. Fundamental Problems in Phonetics. Indiana University Press. ISBN 0-85224-437-1.
- Chitoran, Ioana (2002), "A perception-production study of Romanian diphthongs and glide-vowel sequences" (PDF), Journal of the International Phonetic Association, 32 (2): 203–222, CiteSeerX 10.1.1.116.1413, doi:10.1017/S0025100302001044, S2CID 10104718
- Crystal, David (2008), A Dictionary of Linguistics and Phonetics (6th ed.), Blackwell, ISBN 978-1-4051-5297-6
- Cohen, Antonie [in Dutch] (1971), The phonemes of English: a phonemic study of the vowels and consonants of standard English (third ed.), Springer, ISBN 978-90-247-0639-6
- Ladefoged, Peter; Maddieson, Ian (1996). The Sounds of the World's Languages. Oxford: Blackwell. ISBN 0-631-19815-6.
- Martínez Celdrán, Eugenio (2004), "Problems in the Classification of Approximants" (PDF), Journal of the International Phonetic Association, 34 (2): 201–210, doi:10.1017/S0025100304001732, S2CID 144568679, archived from the original (PDF) on 2010-07-11
- Esling, John H. (2010), "Phonetic Notation", in Hardcastle, William J.; Laver, John; Gibbon, Fiona E. (eds.), The Handbook of Phonetic Sciences (2nd ed.), Wiley-Blackwell, pp. 678–702, doi:10.1002/9781444317251.ch18, ISBN 978-1-4051-4590-9
- Esling, John H. (2005), "There Are No Back Vowels: The Larygeal Articulator Model", Canadian Journal of Linguistics, 50 (1–4): 13–44, doi:10.1017/S0008413100003650
- Meyer, Paul Georg (2005), Synchronic English Linguistics: An Introduction (third ed.), Tübingen: Gunter Narr Verlag, ISBN 978-3-8233-6191-6
