= Spacing Modifier Letters =

- Range: U+02B0..U+02FF (80 code points)
- Plane: BMP
- Scripts: Bopomofo (2 char.); Latin (14 char.); Common (64 char.)
- Major alphabets: IPA
- Assigned: 80 code points
- Unused: 0 reserved code points

Unicode Version History
- 1.0.0 (1991): 57 (+57)
- 3.0 (1999): 63 (+6)
- 4.0 (2003): 80 (+17)

Unicode documentation
- Code chart ∣ Web page

Spacing Modifier Letters is a Unicode block containing characters for the IPA, UPA, and other phonetic transcriptions. Included are the IPA tone marks, and modifiers for aspiration and palatalization. The word spacing indicates that these characters occupy their own horizontal space within a line of text. Its block name in Unicode 1.0 was simply Modifier Letters.

== Character table ==
Code	Glyph (with x as guide)	Decimal	Description
Latin superscript modifier letters
U+02B0	xʰ	&#688;	Modifier Letter Small H
U+02B1	xʱ	&#689;	Modifier Letter Small H with hook
U+02B2	xʲ	&#690;	Modifier Letter Small J
U+02B3	xʳ	&#691;	Modifier Letter Small R
U+02B4	xʴ	&#692;	Modifier Letter Small Turned R
U+02B5	xʵ	&#693;	Modifier Letter Small Turned R with hook
U+02B6	xʶ	&#694;	Modifier Letter Small Capital Inverted R
U+02B7	xʷ	&#695;	Modifier Letter Small W
U+02B8	xʸ	&#696;	Modifier Letter Small Y
Miscellaneous phonetic modifiers
U+02B9	xʹ	&#697;	Modifier Letter Prime
U+02BA	xʺ	&#698;	Modifier Letter Double Prime
U+02BB	xʻ	&#699;	Modifier Letter Turned Comma
U+02BC	xʼ	&#700;	Modifier Letter Apostrophe
U+02BD	xʽ	&#701;	Modifier Letter Reversed Comma
U+02BE	xʾ	&#702;	Modifier Letter Right Half Ring
U+02BF	xʿ	&#703;	Modifier Letter Left Half Ring
U+02C0	xˀ	&#704;	Modifier Letter Glottal Stop
U+02C1	xˁ	&#705;	Modifier Letter Reversed Glottal Stop
U+02C2	x˂	&#706;	Modifier Letter Left Arrowhead
U+02C3	x˃	&#707;	Modifier Letter Right Arrowhead
U+02C4	x˄	&#708;	Modifier Letter Up Arrowhead
U+02C5	x˅	&#709;	Modifier Letter Down Arrowhead
U+02C6	xˆ	&#710;	Modifier Letter Circumflex Accent
U+02C7	xˇ	&#711;	Caron
U+02C8	xˈ	&#712;	Modifier Letter Vertical Line
U+02C9	xˉ	&#713;	Modifier Letter Macron
U+02CA	xˊ	&#714;	Modifier Letter Acute Accent
U+02CB	xˋ	&#715;	Modifier Letter Grave Accent
U+02CC	xˌ	&#716;	Modifier Letter Low Vertical Line
U+02CD	xˍ	&#717;	Modifier Letter Low Macron
U+02CE	xˎ	&#718;	Modifier Letter Low Grave Accent
U+02CF	xˏ	&#719;	Modifier Letter Low Acute Accent
U+02D0	xː	&#720;	Modifier Letter Triangular Colon
U+02D1	xˑ	&#721;	Modifier Letter Half Triangular Colon
U+02D2	x˒	&#722;	Modifier Letter Centered Right Half Ring
U+02D3	x˓	&#723;	Modifier Letter Centered Left Half Ring
U+02D4	x˔	&#724;	Modifier Letter Up Tack
U+02D5	x˕	&#725;	Modifier Letter Down Tack
U+02D6	x˖	&#726;	Modifier Letter Plus Sign
U+02D7	x˗	&#727;	Modifier Letter Minus Sign
Spacing clones of diacritics
U+02D8	x˘	&#728;	Breve
U+02D9	x˙	&#729;	Dot Above
U+02DA	x˚	&#730;	Ring Above
U+02DB	x˛	&#731;	Ogonek
U+02DC	x˜	&#732;	Small Tilde
U+02DD	x˝	&#733;	Double Acute Accent
Additions based on 1989 IPA
U+02DE	x˞	&#734;	Modifier Letter Rhotic Hook
U+02DF	x˟	&#735;	Modifier Letter Cross Accent
U+02E0	xˠ	&#736;	Modifier Letter Small Gamma
U+02E1	xˡ	&#737;	Modifier Letter Small L
U+02E2	xˢ	&#738;	Modifier Letter Small S
U+02E3	xˣ	&#739;	Modifier Letter Small X
U+02E4	xˤ	&#740;	Modifier Letter Small Reversed Glottal Stop
Tone letters
U+02E5	x˥	&#741;	Modifier Letter Extra-High Tone Bar
U+02E6	x˦	&#742;	Modifier Letter High Tone Bar
U+02E7	x˧	&#743;	Modifier Letter Mid Tone Bar
U+02E8	x˨	&#744;	Modifier Letter Low Tone Bar
U+02E9	x˩	&#745;	Modifier Letter Extra-Low Tone Bar
Extended Bopomofo tone marks
U+02EA	x˪	&#746;	Extended Bopomofo Yin Departing (for Minnan and Hakka languages)
U+02EB	x˫	&#747;	Extended Bopomofo Yang Departing (for Minnan and Hakka languages)
IPA modifiers
U+02EC	xˬ	&#748;	Modifier Letter Voicing
U+02ED	x˭	&#749;	Modifier Letter Unaspirated
Other modifier letter
U+02EE	xˮ	&#750;	Modifier Letter Double Apostrophe
UPA modifiers
U+02EF	x˯	&#751;	Modifier Letter Low Down Arrowhead
U+02F0	x˰	&#752;	Modifier Letter Low Up Arrowhead
U+02F1	x˱	&#753;	Modifier Letter Low Left Arrowhead
U+02F2	x˲	&#754;	Modifier Letter Low Right Arrowhead
U+02F3	x˳	&#755;	Modifier Letter Low Ring
U+02F4	x˴	&#756;	Modifier Letter Middle Grave Accent
U+02F5	x˵	&#757;	Modifier Letter Middle Double Grave Accent
U+02F6	x˶	&#758;	Modifier Letter Middle Double Acute Accent
U+02F7	x˷	&#759;	Modifier Letter Low Tilde
U+02F8	x˸	&#760;	Modifier Letter Raised Colon
U+02F9	x˹	&#761;	Modifier Letter Begin High Tone
U+02FA	x˺	&#762;	Modifier Letter End High Tone
U+02FB	x˻	&#763;	Modifier Letter Begin Low Tone
U+02FC	x˼	&#764;	Modifier Letter End Low Tone
U+02FD	x˽	&#765;	Modifier Letter Shelf
U+02FE	x˾	&#766;	Modifier Letter Open Shelf
U+02FF	x˿	&#767;	Modifier Letter Low Left Arrow
Code	Glyph	Decimal	Description

== Compact table ==
Spacing Modifier Letters^{[1]} Official Unicode Consortium code chart (PDF)
	0	1	2	3	4	5	6	7	8	9	A	B	C	D	E	F
U+02Bx	ʰ	ʱ	ʲ	ʳ	ʴ	ʵ	ʶ	ʷ	ʸ	ʹ	ʺ	ʻ	ʼ	ʽ	ʾ	ʿ
U+02Cx	ˀ	ˁ	˂	˃	˄	˅	ˆ	ˇ	ˈ	ˉ	ˊ	ˋ	ˌ	ˍ	ˎ	ˏ
U+02Dx	ː	ˑ	˒	˓	˔	˕	˖	˗	˘	˙	˚	˛	˜	˝	˞	˟
U+02Ex	ˠ	ˡ	ˢ	ˣ	ˤ	˥	˦	˧	˨	˩	˪	˫	ˬ	˭	ˮ	˯
U+02Fx	˰	˱	˲	˳	˴	˵	˶	˷	˸	˹	˺	˻	˼	˽	˾	˿
Notes 1.As of Unicode version 17.0

== History ==
The following Unicode-related documents record the purpose and process of defining specific characters in the Spacing Modifier Letters block:

Version	Final code points (Note: Proposed code points and characters names may differ from final code points and names)	Count	UTC ID	L2 ID	WG2 ID	Document
1.0.0	U+02B0..02DD	46				(to be determined)
1.0.0	U+02B0..02DD	46	UTC/1999-017			Davis, Mark (1999-06-02), Data cross-checks (for Agenda)
1.0.0	U+02B0..02DD	46		L2/99-176R		Moore, Lisa (1999-11-04), "Data Cross-Checks", Minutes from the joint UTC/L2 meeting in Seattle, June 8-10, 1999
1.0.0	U+02B0..02DD	46		L2/99-246	N2043	Everson, Michael (1999-07-24), On the apostrophe and quotation mark, with a note on Egyptian transliteration characters
1.0.0	U+02B0..02DD	46		L2/06-373		Proposal for additional character, 2006-11-04
1.0.0	U+02B0..02DD	46		L2/06-398		Pandey, Anshuman (2006-12-15), Comments on L2/06-373 (addition of 'apostrophe' to Devanagari)
1.0.0	U+02B0..02DD	46		L2/07-272		Muller, Eric (2007-08-10), "9", Report of the South Asia subcommittee
1.0.0	U+02B0..02DD	46		L2/07-225		Moore, Lisa (2007-08-21), "Devanagari", UTC #112 Minutes
1.0.0	U+02B0..02DD	46		L2/08-197		Representation of Bodo, Dogri and Maithili languages in Unicode Standard, 2008-05-06
1.0.0	U+02B0..02DD	46		L2/08-210		Lata, Swaran (2008-05-07), Usage examples for Bodo, Dogri, Maithili tone marker
1.0.0	U+02B0..02DD	46		L2/12-065	N4281	Pentzlin, Karl (2012-02-05), Proposal for additional annotations for some modifier letters used for transliteration of Hebrew
1.0.0	U+02DE, 02E0..02E9	11	UTC/1991-048B			Whistler, Ken (1991-03-27), "IPA additions", Draft Minutes from the UTC meeting #46 day 2, 3/27 at Apple
1.0.0	U+02DE, 02E0..02E9	11		L2/00-421	N2307	Whistler, Ken (2000-11-27), Response to Japanese Query re IPA tone letters
1.0.0	U+02DE, 02E0..02E9	11		L2/01-025	N2312	Constable, Peter (2001-01-08), Presentation of tone contours encoded as UCS tone letter sequences
3.0	U+02DF	1		L2/98-261	N1812 (pdf, html)	Ellert, Mattias (1998-05-21), Proposal to encode CROSS ACCENT in ISO/IEC 10646
3.0	U+02DF	1		L2/98-372	N1884R2 (pdf, doc)	Whistler, Ken; et al. (1998-09-22), Additional Characters for the UCS
3.0	U+02DF	1		L2/98-329	N1920	Combined PDAM registration and consideration ballot on WD for ISO/IEC 10646-1/Amd. 30, AMENDMENT 30: Additional Latin and other characters, 1998-10-28
3.0	U+02DF	1		L2/99-010	N1903 (pdf, html, doc)	Umamaheswaran, V. S. (1998-12-30), "8.2.5", Minutes of WG 2 meeting 35, London, U.K.; 1998-09-21--25
3.0	U+02EA..02EB	2		L2/98-090	N1713R	Proposal to add 24 extended Bopomofo and 2 modifier letters for Minnan and Hakka, 1998-03-19
3.0	U+02EA..02EB	2		L2/98-158		Aliprand, Joan; Winkler, Arnold (1998-05-26), "Bopomofo Extensions", Draft Minutes – UTC #76 & NCITS Subgroup L2 #173 joint meeting, Tredyffrin, Pennsylvania, April 20-22, 1998
3.0	U+02EA..02EB	2		L2/98-286	N1703	Umamaheswaran, V. S.; Ksar, Mike (1998-07-02), "8.25", Unconfirmed Meeting Minutes, WG 2 Meeting #34, Redmond, WA, USA; 1998-03-16--20
3.0	U+02EA..02EB	2		L2/98-321	N1905	Revised text of 10646-1/FPDAM 23, AMENDMENT 23: Bopomofo Extended and other characters, 1998-10-22
3.0	U+02EC..02ED	2		L2/98-299	N1845	Everson, Michael (1998-09-08), Additional IPA "disturbed speech" characters for the UCS
3.0	U+02EC..02ED	2		L2/98-372	N1884R2 (pdf, doc)	Whistler, Ken; et al. (1998-09-22), Additional Characters for the UCS
3.0	U+02EC..02ED	2		L2/98-329	N1920	Combined PDAM registration and consideration ballot on WD for ISO/IEC 10646-1/Amd. 30, AMENDMENT 30: Additional Latin and other characters, 1998-10-28
3.0	U+02EC..02ED	2		L2/06-231		Moore, Lisa (2006-08-17), "Consensus 108-C3", UTC #108 Minutes, "Change the general category of U+02EC MODIFIER LETTER VOICING from "Sk" to "Lm"."
3.0	U+02EE	1		L2/98-295	N1817	Everson, Michael (1997-08-10), Proposal to add the letter MODIFIER LETTER DOUBLE APOSTROPHE in the BMP
3.0	U+02EE	1		L2/98-372	N1884R2 (pdf, doc)	Whistler, Ken; et al. (1998-09-22), Additional Characters for the UCS
3.0	U+02EE	1		L2/98-329	N1920	Combined PDAM registration and consideration ballot on WD for ISO/IEC 10646-1/Amd. 30, AMENDMENT 30: Additional Latin and other characters, 1998-10-28
3.0	U+02EE	1		L2/99-010	N1903 (pdf, html, doc)	Umamaheswaran, V. S. (1998-12-30), "8.2.2", Minutes of WG 2 meeting 35, London, U.K.; 1998-09-21--25
4.0	U+02EF..02FF	17		L2/02-141	N2419	Everson, Michael; et al. (2002-03-20), Uralic Phonetic Alphabet characters for the UCS
4.0	U+02EF..02FF	17		L2/02-192		Everson, Michael (2002-05-02), Everson's Reply on UPA
4.0	U+02EF..02FF	17			N2442	Everson, Michael; Kolehmainen, Erkki I.; Ruppel, Klaas; Trosterud, Trond (2002-05-21), Justification for placing the Uralic Phonetic Alphabet in the BMP
4.0	U+02EF..02FF	17		L2/02-291		Whistler, Ken (2002-05-31), WG2 report from Dublin
4.0	U+02EF..02FF	17		L2/02-292		Whistler, Ken (2002-06-03), Early look at WG2 consent docket
4.0	U+02EF..02FF	17		L2/02-166R2		Moore, Lisa (2002-08-09), "Scripts and New Characters - UPA", UTC #91 Minutes
4.0	U+02EF..02FF	17		L2/02-253		Moore, Lisa (2002-10-21), "Consensus 92-C2", UTC #92 Minutes

== See also ==
- Modifier letter
- Phonetic symbols in Unicode
