= E' =

E' (E + apostrophe) may represent:

- E′ (E + prime)
- É (E + acute accent)

It is not to be confused with:

- È (E + grave accent)
- Ė (E + overdot)
- Eʻ (E + ʻokina)
- Eꞌ (E + saltillo)
- Ẻ (E + hook above)
- Eʾ (E + right half ring)
- Eʿ (E + left half ring)
