= Modifier Tone Letters =

- Range: U+A700..U+A71F (32 code points)
- Plane: BMP
- Scripts: Common
- Symbol sets: Tone marks
- Assigned: 32 code points
- Unused: 0 reserved code points

Unicode version history
- 4.1 (2005): 23 (+23)
- 5.0 (2006): 27 (+4)
- 5.1 (2008): 32 (+5)

Unicode documentation
- Code chart ∣ Web page

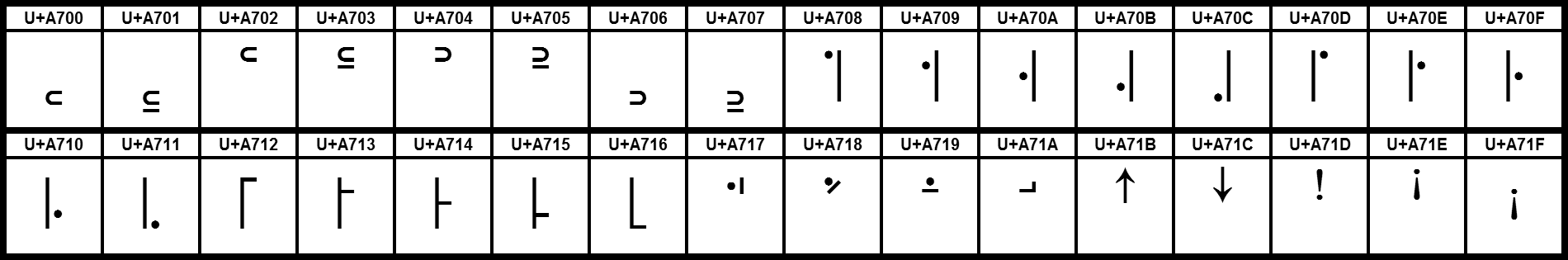
Graphical representation of the Modifier Tone Letters Unicode block

Modifier Tone Letters is a Unicode block containing tone markings for Chinese, Chinantec, Africanist, and other phonetic transcriptions. It does not contain the standard IPA tone marks, which are found in Spacing Modifier Letters.

⟨꜀◌ ꜁◌ ꜂◌ ꜃◌ ◌꜄ ◌꜅ ◌꜆ ◌꜇⟩ are used to mark yin and (underlined) yang splits of the ping, shang, qu and ru tones, respectively, in the etymological four-tone analysis of Chinese. The dotted tone letters ⟨꜈ ꜉ ꜊ ꜋ ꜌⟩ are used for the pitch of neutral tones, while the reversed tone letters ⟨꜒ ꜓ ꜔ ꜕ ꜖⟩ and neutral ⟨꜍ ꜎ ꜏ ꜐ ꜑⟩ are used for tone sandhi. ⟨ ꜗ ꜘ ꜙ ꜚ ⟩ are modifier letters used in Ozumacín Chinantec. ⟨ꜛ ꜜ⟩ are the IPA modifier letters for upstep and downstep, while ⟨ꜝ ꜞ ꜟ⟩ are substitutes people used before broad font support of the IPA, and still preferred by some.

== Block ==
Modifier Tone Letters^{[1]} Official Unicode Consortium code chart (PDF)
	0	1	2	3	4	5	6	7	8	9	A	B	C	D	E	F
U+A70x	꜀	꜁	꜂	꜃	꜄	꜅	꜆	꜇	꜈	꜉	꜊	꜋	꜌	꜍	꜎	꜏
U+A71x	꜐	꜑	꜒	꜓	꜔	꜕	꜖	ꜗ	ꜘ	ꜙ	ꜚ	ꜛ	ꜜ	ꜝ	ꜞ	ꜟ
Notes 1.As of Unicode version 17.0

== History ==
The following Unicode-related documents record the purpose and process of defining specific characters in the Modifier Tone Letters block:

Version	Final code points (Note: Proposed code points and characters names may differ from final code points and names)	Count	L2 ID	WG2 ID	Document
4.1	U+A700..A716	23	L2/03-317	N2626	Proposal on IPA Extensions & Combining Diacritical Marks for ISO/IEC 10646 in BMP, 2003-09-27
4.1	U+A700..A716	23	L2/03-339	N2646	Constable, Peter (2003-10-08), Comments on N2626, Proposal on IPA Extensions and Combining Diacritic Marks for ISO/IEC 10646 in BMP
4.1	U+A700..A716	23	L2/03-372	N2673	Anderson, Deborah (2003-10-22), Comments on N2626, "Proposal on IPA Extensions & Combining Diacritic Marks for ISO 10646 in BMP"
4.1	U+A700..A716	23	L2/04-107	N2713	Revised Proposal for encoding A Supplemented Set of IPA Combining Marks, Modifier Letters & Five-Degree Contour Tone Marks, 2004-03-20
4.1	U+A700..A716	23	L2/04-156R2		Moore, Lisa (2004-08-13), "Supplemental set of IPA combing marks, modifier letters, and five-degree contour tone marks (A.7)", UTC #99 Minutes
5.0	U+A717..A71A	4	L2/04-246R		Priest, Lorna (2004-07-26), Revised Proposal for Additional Latin Phonetic and Orthographic Characters
5.0	U+A717..A71A	4	L2/04-349		Priest, Lorna (2004-08-27), Proposal to Encode Chinantec Tone Marks and Orthographic 'at' Characters
5.0	U+A717..A71A	4	L2/04-349R	N2883	Priest, Lorna (2004-12-09), Proposal to Encode Chinantec Tone Marks
5.1	U+A71B..A71F	5		N2945	Priest, Lorna; Constable, Peter (2005-08-09), Proposal to Encode Additional Latin Phonetic and Orthographic Characters
5.1	U+A71B..A71F	5		N2953 (pdf, doc)	Umamaheswaran, V. S. (2006-02-16), "7.2.8", Unconfirmed minutes of WG 2 meeting 47, Sophia Antipolis, France; 2005-09-12/15
5.1	U+A71B..A71F	5		N3103 (pdf, doc)	Umamaheswaran, V. S. (2006-08-25), "M48.1", Unconfirmed minutes of WG 2 meeting 48, Mountain View, CA, USA; 2006-04-24/27

== See also ==
- Phonetic symbols in Unicode
