= Roundedness =

Lip formation during the articulation of a vowel

In phonetics, vowel roundedness is the rounding of the lips, or lack thereof, during the articulation of a vowel. It is the degree and kind of labialization of a vowel. In the International Phonetic Alphabet vowel chart, rounded vowels are the ones that appear on the right in each bulleted pair of letters, and the corresponding unrounded vowels are the ones on the left, with [a] (when central) and the unpaired vowels [ɐ] and [ə] being neutral or unspecified. In most dialects of English, the vowel with the greatest degree of rounding is /u/, as in the word too, though some languages have significantly greater rounding of their /u/ vowel.

The contrary articulation to rounded is spread lips, in which the corners of the mouth are pulled away from each other but the lips remain fairly close together. In English, as in most languages, the vowel with the greatest lip-spreading is /i/, as in the word see.

When a (back) rounded vowel is pronounced, the lips form a circular opening that is typically wider or smaller according to how open or close the vowel is, while unrounded vowels are pronounced with the lips either spread or relaxed (neutral between spread and rounded). The degree of lip-spreading also correlates with the height of the vowel. In most languages, front vowels are spread and back vowels rounded; acoustically, this helps distinguish back vowels from front. However, some languages, such as French and German, contrast rounded and unrounded front vowels, and others, like Vietnamese, contrast rounded and unrounded back vowels. Turkish contrasts rounded and unrounded among both front and back vowels. The kind of rounding typically found with front and back vowels differs, though this detail is not commonly specified in descriptions of languages unless it's atypical.

Alekano is unusual in having only unrounded vowels.

== Typology ==
=== Degrees of rounding ===
The primary and secondary cardinal vowels of the IPA are defined on clines of roundedness, which reflect typical articulation across languages. Generally, both spreading and rounding become more significant as the height of the vowel increases. Open vowels typically have a neutral lip position – that is, neither rounded nor spread – because the open jaw allows for limited articulation of the lips.

Among the IPA primary cardinal back vowels [ɑ ɔ o u], this ranges progressively from a neutral (relaxed) lip position in [ɑ], through open (loose) rounding in [ɔ], more substantial rounding in [o], to closely (tightly) rounded [u]. The secondary cardinal vowel [ɒ] lies between [ɑ] and [ɔ], and the rounded front vowels [ɶ œ ø y] follow a cline of rounding parallel to the back vowels [ɒ ɔ o u].

Among the IPA primary cardinal front vowels [a ɛ e i], which are all unrounded, there is a similar cline from neutral [a], through slightly spread lips in [ɛ], more substantial spreading in [e], to fully spread [i]. The back unrounded vowels [ɑ ʌ ɤ ɯ] follow a parallel cline of lip-spreading.

The IPA cardinal close central vowels [ɨ ʉ] are fully spread and closely rounded, respectively. The degrees of rounding and spreading of the non-cardinal central vowels is not made explicit by the IPA, but implicitly they follow the cardinal vowels of the same height. Thus, parallel and increasing rounding (from neutral-lip to open-rounded to close-rounded) can be expected from the sets of increasingly close vowels:

[a ɑ] < [ɶ ɒ] < [œ ɞ ɔ] < [ø ɵ o] < [y ʉ u]

Similarly, increasing spreading (from neutral-lip to spread-lip) can be expected from the sets of increasingly close vowels:

[a ɑ] < [ɛ ɜ ʌ] < [e ɘ ɤ] < [i ɨ ɯ]

==== Over-rounding and under-rounding ====
Vowels that do not have the expected degree of rounding from the IPA letter they are transcribed with may be clarified as more or less rounded with the over-rounding diacritic U+0339 ◌̹ COMBINING RIGHT HALF RING BELOW and the under-rounding diacritic U+031C ◌̜ COMBINING LEFT HALF RING BELOW. These diacritics specify that the vowel lies further toward the rounded or spread end of the roundedness cline.

Thus, [o̜] has less rounding than cardinal [o] (closer to the open rounding of cardinal [ɔ] or even [ɒ]), and [o̹] has greater rounding (closer to that of cardinal [u]). These diacritics are also used with unrounded vowels: [ɛ̜] is more spread than cardinal [ɛ] (closer to [e] or even [i]), and [ɯ̹] is less spread than cardinal [ɯ] (closer to [ɤ] or a more open vowel); it may or may not be slightly rounded.

=== Protruded versus compressed rounding ===
Example 1

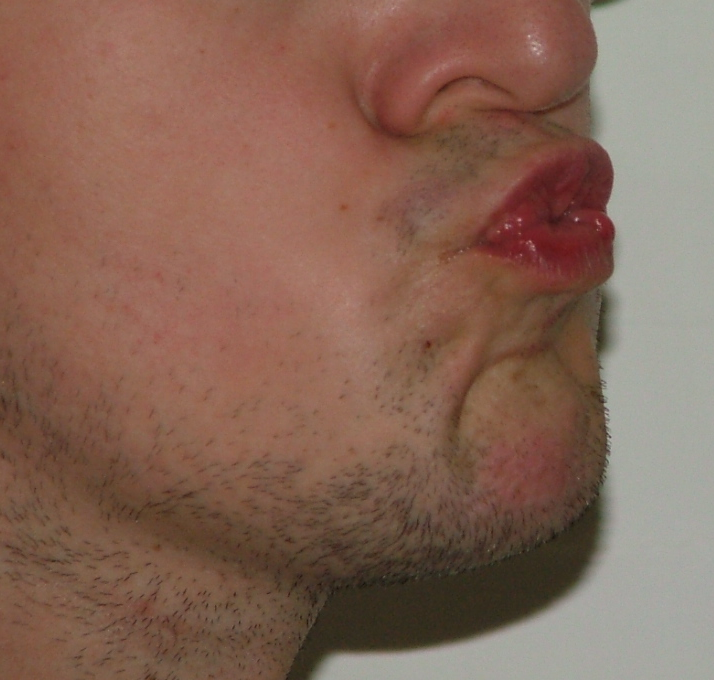
Protruded rounding

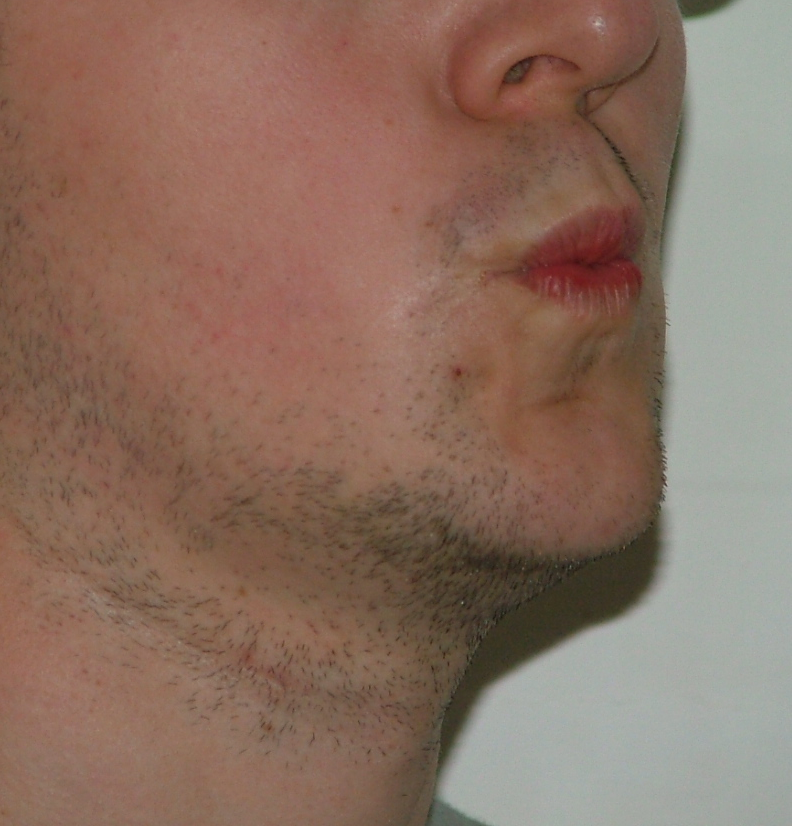
Compressed rounding

Example 2

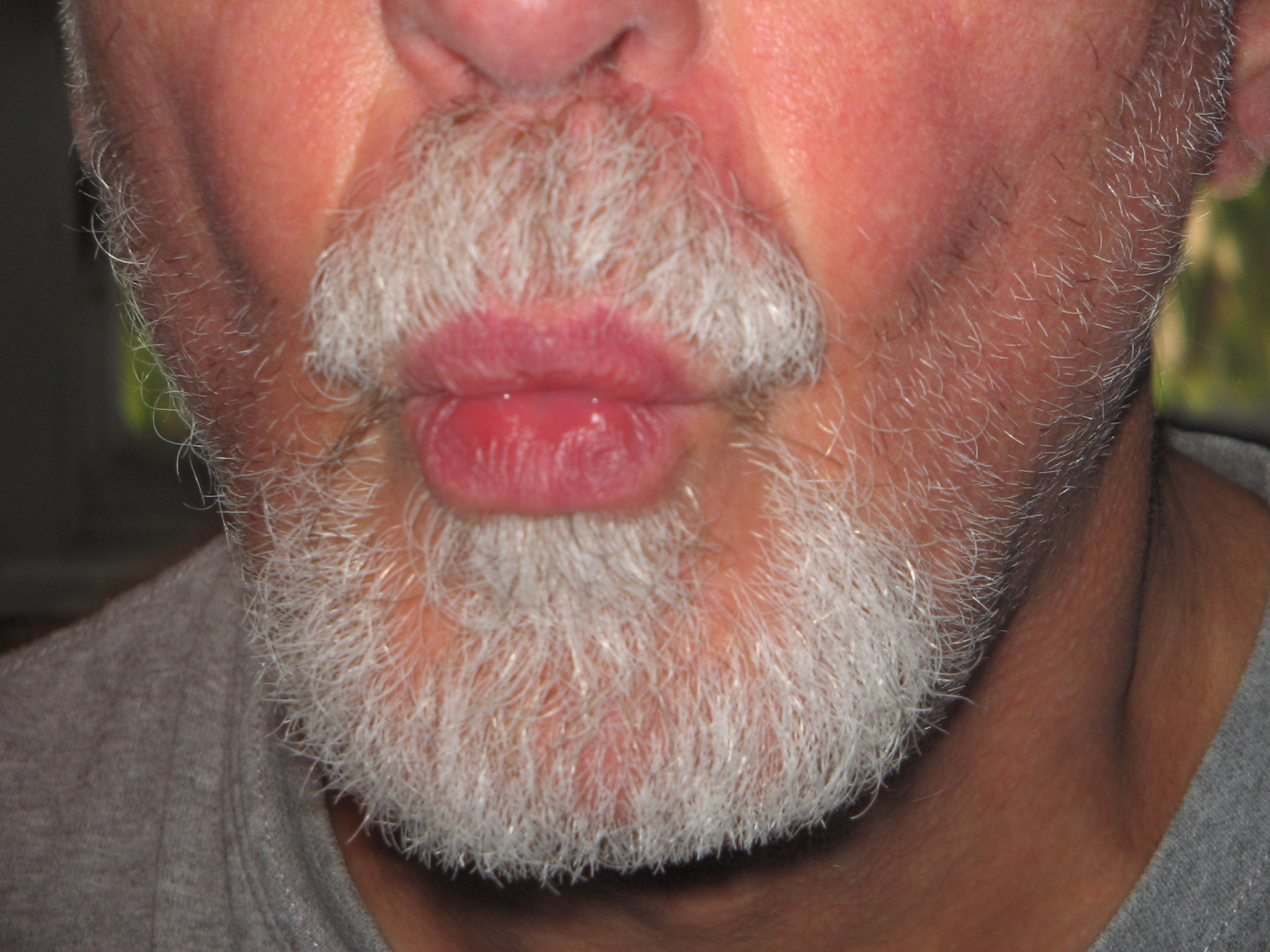
Protruded rounding

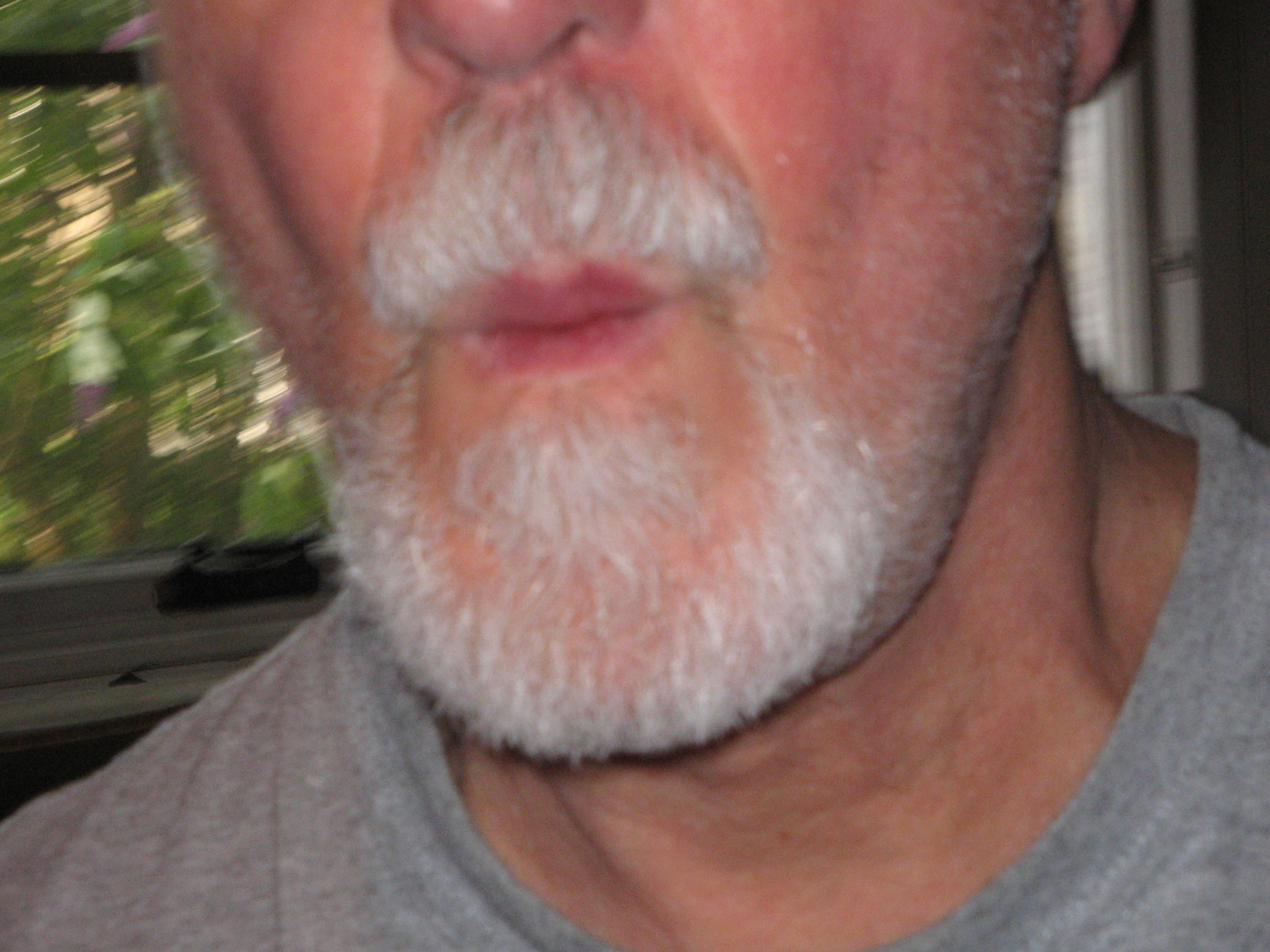
Compressed rounding

There are two main types of vowel rounding: protrusion and compression, with various terminology. In protruded rounding, the corners of the mouth are drawn together and the lips protrude like a tube, with their inner surface visible. In compressed rounding, the corners of the mouth are drawn together, but the lips are also drawn together horizontally ("compressed") and do not protrude, with only their outer surface visible. That is, in protruded vowels airflow is directed along the inner surfaces of the lips (thus the alternate term endolabial), whereas in compressed vowels it is directed along the outer surfaces (thus exolabial – see § Terminology). Back and central rounded vowels, such as German /o/ and /u/, are typically protruded, whereas front rounded vowels such as German /ø/ and /y/ are typically compressed. Back or central compressed vowels and front protruded vowels are uncommon, (Note: Sweet (1877) noted that they are less distinctive from unrounded vowels than are their counterparts.) and a contrast between the two types has been found to be phonemic in only one instance. (Note: Swedish also has a back compressed [ɯᵝ] ⟨o⟩ as well as both front compressed [y] ⟨u⟩ and front protruded [yʷ] ⟨y⟩; the front rounded vowels contrast in ruta 'window pane' and ryta 'roar'.)

There are no dedicated IPA diacritics to represent the distinction, but the superscript IPA letter ⟨◌ᵝ⟩ or ⟨◌ᶹ⟩ can be used for compression (Note: E.g. ⟨ɨᵝ⟩ in Flemming (2002, p. 83). The IPA Handbook suggests that ⟨ᶹ⟩ "might be used" for "a secondary reduction of the lip opening accompanied by neither protrusion nor velar constriction", though in the VoQS system this diacritic is instead used more specifically for labiodentalization.) and ⟨◌ʷ⟩ for protrusion. Compressed vowels may be pronounced either with the corners of the mouth drawn in, by some definitions rounded, or with the corners spread and, by the same definitions, unrounded. (Note: The extIPA spread lip diacritic ⟨◌͍⟩ has sometimes been used to distinguish compressed vowels, as in ⟨u͍⟩, but this is not the original intended meaning of the diacritic.) The distinction may be transcribed ⟨ʉᵝ uᵝ⟩ vs ⟨ɨᵝ ɯᵝ⟩ (or ⟨ʉᶹ uᶹ⟩ vs ⟨ɨᶹ ɯᶹ⟩) for vowels analyzed as rounded and unrounded. (Note: To avoid the implication that the superscript represents an off-glide, it might be placed above the base letter: ⟨yᷱ, ɯᷩ⟩. Ladefoged & Maddieson use old IPA ⟨◌̫⟩ for protrusion (w-like labialization without velarization), while Kelly & Local (1989, p. 154) use a combining ⟨w⟩ as in ⟨◌ᪿ⟩ for protrusion (e.g. ⟨øᪿ⟩) and a combining ⟨ʍ⟩ as in ⟨◌ᫀ⟩ for compression (e.g. ⟨uᫀ⟩). This recalls the old IPA convention mentioned next.) An old IPA convention of rounding an unrounded vowel letter like ⟨i⟩ with a subscript omega, ⟨i̫⟩, and unrounding a rounded letter like ⟨u⟩ with a turned omega, ⟨u᫦⟩, has been conventionalized as ⟨◌̫⟩ for protruded and ⟨◌᫦⟩ for compressed.

The distinction between protruded back [u] and compressed front [y] holds for the back and front rounded semivowels [w] and [ɥ], which are typically protruded and compressed, respectively. In general, the kind of rounding of the semivowels is found in any other labialized consonants in the language. In Akan, for example, labio-palatal [ɥ] is compressed, as are labio-palatalized consonants as in Twi [tɕᶣi̘] "Twi" and adwuma [adʑᶣu̘ma] "work", whereas labio-velar [w] and labio-velarized consonants are protruded. (Only plain labio-velarization is phonemic in Akan; the compression arises from phonetic assimilation between the labialization of the consonant and the lip-spreading of a following front vowel, which palatalizes the consonant.) Compare also the unusual rounding of Tillamook vowels and consonants below.

The protruded–compressed distinction is rarely relevant to other consonants. In Southern Teke, the sole language reported to have a phonemic /ɱ/, the labiodental sound is "accompanied by strong protrusion of both lips", whereas the [ɱ] found as an allophone of /m/ before /f, v/ in languages such as English is not protruded, as the lip contacts the teeth along its upper or outer edge. Also, in at least one account of speech acquisition of English, a child's pronunciation of clown involves a lateral [f] in which the upper teeth contact the upper, outer edge of the lip, but in crown, a median [f] is pronounced so that the teeth contact the inner surface of the protruded lower lip.

==== Terminology ====
The varied competing terms for protrusion and compression can be easy to confuse. Pairs of terms include:

Competing terms
Protrusion ([u, w]-like)	Compression ([y, ɥ]-like)
endolabial	exolabial
horizontal lip-rounding	vertical lip-rounding
outrounding	inrounding
inner rounding	outer rounding
pouted (lip-pouting)	pursed

Henry Sweet noted in 1890 that "the term 'inner rounding' derives from the use of the inner surfaces of the lips; the synonymous 'outrounding' derives from the forward projection of the lips. Both terms are justifiable, but their coexistence is likely to lead to serious confusion." There is no such proliferation of terms for lip-spreading.

=== Perceptual (non-labial) rounding ===
Some vowels transcribed with rounded IPA letters may not be rounded at all, and instead achieve the acoustic effect of roundedness by other (internal) articulatory means. An example is /ɒ/, the vowel of lot, which in Received Pronunciation has very little (if any) rounding of the lips. According to some linguists, the "throaty" sound of the vowel is instead accomplished with sulcalization, a furrowing of the back of the tongue also found in /ɜː/, the vowel of nurse in non-rhotic accents. (Note: Catford (2001, p. 162) observes that the equivalent /ɝ/ in rhotic accents has a strong degree of sulcalization.) Before the language went extinct, Tillamook was reported to have had "internal rounding" for /u/ and /w/ (as well as for its rounded sets of velar and uvular consonants) that was produced by a "cupping of the tongue, not by any rounding of the lips", but it is unclear from the limited description if this refers to the same feature as sulcalization. (Note: Sulcalization is a coronal plane concavity, while "cupping of the tongue" could be referring to either a coronal or sagittal plane concavity.)

It is possible to mimic the acoustic effect of rounded vowels by narrowing the cheeks, so-called "cheek rounding", which is inherent in back protruded (but not front compressed) vowels. The technique is used by ventriloquists to mask the visible rounding of back vowels like [u]. It is not clear if it is used by languages with rounded vowels that do not use visible labial rounding, such as Seneca and other Northern Iroquoian languages, or if they are more like Tillamook.

== Transcription ==
As noted above, when strictly following the IPA, superscript letters can be used to distinguish protruded and compressed vowels. However, such a transcription could be misread as indicating diphthongization. Another possibility is to use the two retired IPA diacritics for over/under-rounding, ⟨◌̫⟩ for protruded and its inverse, ⟨◌᫦⟩, for compressed.

Central vowels may be indicated with a trema ⟨◌̈⟩, (Note: Both [ÿ] and [ü] have been mentioned at various times in the IPA Handbook, without comment on the implied difference in rounding.) occasionally doubled to indicate a greater degree, but both more precisely mean centralized and not necessarily central. The IPA convention of barred ⟨ɨ⟩, ⟨ɵ⟩ and ⟨ʉ⟩ is sometimes extended to other letters to indicate that the vocoid (vowel or semivowel) is truly central. See nonstandard symbols in the IPA for further sources.

The charts below list (para-)IPA transcriptions of attested vocoid positions that contrast spread, compressed, and protruded roundedness (each set presented in that order).

Transcription of attested spread, compressed, and protruded sets of vocoids

Superscript letters
	(Near-)front	Central	(Near-)back
Semivowel	j ɥ ɥʷ	j̈ ɥ̈ ẅ	ɰ wᵝ w
Close	i y yʷ	ɨ ÿ/ʉᵝ ʉ	ɯ uᵝ u
Near-close	ɪ ʏ ʏʷ	ɪ̈ ʏ̈ ʊ̈	ɯ̽ ʊᵝ ʊ
Close-mid	e ø øʷ	ɘ ø̈/ɵᵝ ɵ	ɤ oᵝ o
Open-mid	ɛ œ œʷ		

Para-IPA diacritics
	(Near-)front	Central	(Near-)back
Semivowel	j ɥ ɥ᫇	ɉ ɥ̶ w̶ (Note: ⟨𝼾 𝼿⟩ (barred ⟨ɥ w⟩) are scheduled for publication with Unicode 18 in late 2026.)	ɰ w᫦ w
Close	i y y᫇	ɨ ɏ ʉ	ɯ u᫦ u
Near-close	ɪ ʏ ʏ̫	ᵻ ʏ̵ ᵿ	ɯ̽ ʊ᫦ ʊ
Close-mid	e ø ø̫	ɘ ɵ᫦ ɵ	ɤ o᫦ o
Open-mid	ɛ œ œ̫		

== Rounding and labialization ==
Protruded rounding is the vocalic equivalent of consonantal labialization. Thus, rounded vowels and labialized consonants affect one another by phonetic assimilation: Rounded vowels labialize consonants, and labialized consonants round vowels.

In many languages, such effects are minor phonetic detail, but in others, they become significant. For example, in Vietnamese, the velar codas /k/ and /ŋ/ are labialized [kʷ] and [ŋʷ] or even labial-velar [kp] and [ŋm] after the rounded vowels /u/ and /o/.

In the Northwest Caucasian languages of southern Russia and Georgia, and Arrernte of central Australia, what were historically rounded vowels transferred their roundedness to adjacent consonants, producing large series of phonemically labialized consonants while they themselves became unrounded in the process.

== Roundedness in English ==
Vowel pairs differentiated by roundedness can be found in some British dialects (such as the Cardiff dialect, Geordie and Port Talbot English) as well as in General South African English and New Zealand English. They involve a contrastive pair of close-mid vowels, with the unrounded vowel being either SQUARE /ɛər/ or a monophthongal FACE /eɪ/ and the rounded counterpart being NURSE /ɜːr/. Contrasts based on roundedness are rarely categorical in English and they may be enhanced by additional differences in height, backness or diphthongization.

FACE, SQUARE and NURSE in some dialects
Accent	Vowel			Notes
Accent	FACE	SQUARE	NURSE	Notes
Cardiff	[ei]	[eː]	[øː]	SQUARE may be open-mid [ɛː].
General SAE	[eɪ]	[eː]	[øː]	
Geordie	[eː]	[ɛː]	[øː]	FACE may be diphthongal [ɪə ~ eɪ], whereas NURSE may be back [ɔː] or unrounded [ɪː ~ ɜː].
Port Talbot	[eː]	[ɛː]	[øː]	The accent does not feature the pane–pain merger.

In addition, contemporary Standard Southern British English as well as Western Pennsylvania English contrast STRUT with LOT mostly by rounding. An example of a minimal pairs is nut vs. not. The vowels are open-mid [ʌ, ɔ] in the former dialect and open [ɑ, ɒ] in the latter. In Western Pennsylvania English, the LOT class also includes the THOUGHT class (see cot-caught merger) and the PALM one (see father-bother merger). In addition, LOT may be longer than STRUT due to its being a free vowel: [ɒː]. In SSBE, these are all distinct and LOT is a checked vowel. In Scottish English, the two vowels tend to be realized as [ʌ] and [ɔ], respectively. The latter often includes the THOUGHT class as the cot-caught merger is common in Scotland. If THOUGHT is distinct, it is realized as [ɔ], whereas LOT is lowered to [ɒ] or raised to [o̞]. This means that while nought [nɔʔ] contrasts with nut [nʌʔ] by rounding, not may have a different vowel [nɒʔ ~ no̞ʔ]. In addition, all three vowels are short in Scotland (see Scottish vowel length rule), unless followed by a voiced fricative where THOUGHT (and LOT, if they are merged) is long, as in England.

STRUT, LOT and THOUGHT in some dialects
Accent	Vowel			Notes
Accent	STRUT	LOT	THOUGHT	Notes
Scottish English	[ʌ]	[ɔ(ː) ~ ɒ ~ o̞]	[ɔ(ː)]	LOT often merges with THOUGHT.
Standard Southern British English	[ʌ]	[ɔ]	[o̞ː]	
Western Pennsylvania English	[ɑ]	[ɒ(ː)]		The LOT class also includes THOUGHT and PALM.

General South African English is unique among accents of English in that it can feature up to three front rounded vowels, with two of them having unrounded counterparts.

Long front vowels in General SAE
Height	Unr. vowel		Rnd. vowel		Notes
Height	lexical set	realization	lexical set	realization	Notes
Close	FLEECE	[iː]	GOOSE	[yː]	GOOSE may be central [ʉː].
Close-mid	SQUARE	[eː]	NURSE	[øː]	
Open-mid	(unpaired)		GOAT	[œː]	GOAT may be diphthongal [œɤ̈].

The potential contrast between the close-mid [øː] and the open-mid [œː] is hard to perceive by outsiders, making utterances such as the total onslaught [ðə ˈtœːtl̩ ˈɒnsloːt] sound almost like the turtle onslaught [ðə ˈtøːtl̩ ˈɒnsloːt].

== See also ==
- Close back compressed vowel [uᵝ] (in Japanese and Swedish)
- Near-close back compressed vowel [ʊᵝ] (in Swedish)
- Close central compressed vowel [ÿ] (in Norwegian)
- Mid central compressed vowel [ø̈] (in Swedish)
- Close front compressed vowel [y] (in French, German, etc.)
- Mid front compressed vowel [ø] (in French, German, etc.)
- Close front protruded vowel [yʷ] (in Swedish)
- Near-close front protruded vowel [ʏʷ] (in Swedish)
- Close-mid front protruded vowel [øʷ] (in Swedish)
- Open-mid front protruded vowel [œʷ] (in Swedish)
- Close central protruded vowel [ʉ]
- Mid central protruded vowel [ɵ]
- Close back protruded vowel [u] (common)
- Mid back protruded vowel [o] (common)
- List of phonetics topics

== Bibliography ==
- Allen, W. Sidney (1978). Vox Latina: A Guide to the Pronunciation of Classical Latin (2nd ed.). Cambridge University Press. ISBN 0-521-37936-9.
- Catford, J. C. (1982) [1977]. Fundamental Problems in Phonetics. Indiana University Press. ISBN 0-85224-437-1.
- Catford, J. C. (2001). A Practical Introduction to Phonetics (2nd ed.). Oxford University Press. ISBN 978-0199246359.
- Collins, Beverley; Mees, Inger M. (1990). "The Phonetics of Cardiff English". In Coupland, Nikolas; Thomas, Alan Richard (eds.). English in Wales: Diversity, Conflict, and Change. Multilingual Matters Ltd. pp. 87–103. ISBN 1-85359-032-0.
- Connolly, John H. (1990). "Port Talbot English". In Coupland, Nikolas; Thomas, Alan Richard (eds.). English in Wales: Diversity, Conflict, and Change. Multilingual Matters Ltd. pp. 121–129. ISBN 1-85359-032-0.
- Cruttenden, Alan (2014). Gimson's Pronunciation of English (8th ed.). Routledge. ISBN 9781444183092.
- Deibler, Ellis (1992). "Alekano Organised Phonology Data".
- Dolphyne, Florence Abena (1988). The Akan (Twi-Fante) Language: Its Sound Systems and Tonal Structure. Ghana Universities Press. ISBN 9964-3-0159-6.
- Engstrand, Olle (1990). "Swedish (Illustrations of the IPA)". Journal of the International Phonetic Association. 20 (1). Cambridge University Press: 42–44. doi:10.1017/S0025100300004060.
- Flemming, Edward S. (2002). Auditory Representations in Phonology. Routledge. ISBN 0-81534041-9.
- International Phonetic Association (1990). "Further Report on the 1989 Kiel Convention". Journal of the International Phonetic Association. 20 (2): 22–24. JSTOR 44526801.
- International Phonetic Association (1999). Handbook of the International Phonetic Association: A Guide to the Use of the International Phonetic Alphabet. Cambridge University Press. ISBN 0-52163751-1.
- Kelly, John; Local, John (1989). Doing Phonology: Observing, Recording, Interpreting. Manchester University Press. ISBN 0-7190-2894-9.
- Labov, William; Ash, Sharon; Boberg, Charles (2006). The Atlas of North American English. Berlin: Mouton-de Gruyter. pp. 187–208. ISBN 978-3-11-016746-7.
- Ladefoged, Peter; Maddieson, Ian (1996). The Sounds of the World's Languages. Oxford: Blackwell. ISBN 0-631-19815-6.
- Lass, Roger (1984). Phonology: An Introduction to Basic Concepts. Cambridge University Press. ISBN 0-521-28183-0.
- Lass, Roger (2002). "South African English". In Mesthrie, Rajend (ed.). Language in South Africa. Cambridge University Press. ISBN 9780521791052.
- Mayr, Robert (2010). "What Exactly Is a Front Rounded Vowel? An Acoustic and Articulatory Investigation of the NURSE Vowel in South Wales English". Journal of the International Phonetic Association. 40 (1): 93–112. JSTOR 44527004.
- Okada, Hideo (1999). "Japanese". Handbook of the International Phonetic Association: A Guide to the Use of the International Phonetic Alphabet. Cambridge University Press. pp. 117–119. ISBN 0-52163751-1.
- Paulian, Christiane (1975). "Le Kukuya, langue teke du Congo: phonologie – classes nominales". Bibliothèque de la SELAF. 49–50.
- Pullum, Geoffrey K.; Ladusaw, William A. (1996). Phonetic Symbol Guide (2nd ed.). University of Chicago Press. ISBN 0-226-68536-5.
- Robins, R. H. (2014). General Linguistics (4th ed.). Routledge. ISBN 978-0-582-29144-7.
- Sweet, Henry (1877). A Handbook of Phonetics. Clarendon Press.
- Thompson, Laurence C.; Thompson, M. Terry (1966). "A Fresh Look at Tillamook Phonology". International Journal of American Linguistics. 32 (4): 313–319. doi:10.1086/464920. JSTOR 1264085. S2CID 145658086.
- Trask, R. L. (1996). A Dictionary of Phonetics and Phonology. Routledge. ISBN 0-415-11260-5.
- Watt, Dominic; Allen, William (2003). "Tyneside English". Journal of the International Phonetic Association. 33 (2): 267–271. doi:10.1017/S0025100303001397. S2CID 195784010.
- Wells, John C. (1982). Accents of English. Vol. 2: The British Isles (pp. i–xx, 279–466). Cambridge University Press. doi:10.1017/CBO9780511611759. ISBN 0-52128540-2.
- Westerman, D.; Ward, Ida C. (2015) [1933]. Practical Phonetics for Students of African Languages. Routledge. ISBN 978-1-138-92604-2.

Place →	Labial					Coronal										Dorsal					Laryngeal			
Manner ↓	Bilabial		Labiodental		Linguolabial		Dental		Alveolar		Postalveolar		Retroflex		(Alveolo-)palatal		Velar		Uvular		Pharyngeal/epiglottal		Glottal	
Nasal	m̥	m	ɱ̊	ɱ		n̼	n̪̊	n̪	n̥	n	n̠̊	n̠	ɳ̊	ɳ	ɲ̊	ɲ	ŋ̊	ŋ	ɴ̥	ɴ				
Plosive	p	b	p̪	b̪	t̼	d̼	t̪	d̪	t	d			ʈ	ɖ	c	ɟ	k	ɡ	q	ɢ	ʡ		ʔ	
Sibilant affricate							t̪s̪	d̪z̪	ts	dz	t̠ʃ	d̠ʒ	tʂ	dʐ	tɕ	dʑ								
Non-sibilant affricate	pɸ	bβ	p̪f	b̪v			t̪θ	d̪ð	tɹ̝̊	dɹ̝	t̠ɹ̠̊˔	d̠ɹ̠˔			cç	ɟʝ	kx	ɡɣ	qχ	ɢʁ	ʡʜ	ʡʢ	ʔh	
Sibilant fricative							s̪	z̪	s	z	ʃ	ʒ	ʂ	ʐ	ɕ	ʑ								
Non-sibilant fricative	ɸ	β	f	v	θ̼	ð̼	θ	ð	θ̠	ð̠	ɹ̠̊˔	ɹ̠˔	ɻ̊˔	ɻ˔	ç	ʝ	x	ɣ	χ	ʁ	ħ	ʕ	h	ɦ
Approximant		β̞		ʋ				ð̞		ɹ		ɹ̠		ɻ		j		ɰ						˷
Tap/flap		ⱱ̟		ⱱ					ɾ̥	ɾ			ɽ̊	ɽ						ɢ̆		ʡ̆		
Trill	ʙ̥	ʙ							r̥	r		r̠	ɽ̊r̥	ɽr					ʀ̥	ʀ	ʜ	ʢ		
Lateral affricate									tɬ	dɮ			tꞎ	d𝼅	c𝼆	ɟʎ̝	k𝼄	ɡʟ̝						
Lateral fricative							ɬ̪		ɬ	ɮ			ꞎ	𝼅	𝼆	ʎ̝	𝼄	ʟ̝						
Lateral approximant								l̪	l̥	l		l̠	ɭ̊	ɭ	ʎ̥	ʎ	ʟ̥	ʟ		ʟ̠				
Lateral tap/flap									ɺ̥	ɺ			𝼈̊	𝼈		ʎ̆		ʟ̆						

		BL	LD	D	A	PA	RF	P	V	U
Implosive	Voiced	ɓ			ɗ		ᶑ	ʄ	ɠ	ʛ
Implosive	Voiceless	ɓ̥			ɗ̥		ᶑ̊	ʄ̊	ɠ̊	ʛ̥
Ejective	Stop	pʼ			tʼ		ʈʼ	cʼ	kʼ	qʼ
Ejective	Affricate		p̪fʼ	t̪θʼ	tsʼ	t̠ʃʼ	tʂʼ	tɕʼ	kxʼ	qχʼ
Ejective	Fricative	ɸʼ	fʼ	θʼ	sʼ	ʃʼ	ʂʼ	ɕʼ	xʼ	χʼ
Ejective	Lateral affricate				tɬʼ			c𝼆ʼ	k𝼄ʼ	q𝼄ʼ
Ejective	Lateral fricative				ɬʼ					
Click (top: velar; bottom: uvular)	Tenuis	kʘ qʘ		kǀ qǀ	kǃ qǃ		k𝼊 q𝼊	kǂ qǂ		
Click (top: velar; bottom: uvular)	Voiced	ɡʘ ɢʘ		ɡǀ ɢǀ	ɡǃ ɢǃ		ɡ𝼊 ɢ𝼊	ɡǂ ɢǂ		
Click (top: velar; bottom: uvular)	Nasal	ŋʘ ɴʘ		ŋǀ ɴǀ	ŋǃ ɴǃ		ŋ𝼊 ɴ𝼊	ŋǂ ɴǂ	ʞ	
Click (top: velar; bottom: uvular)	Tenuis lateral				kǁ qǁ					
Click (top: velar; bottom: uvular)	Voiced lateral				ɡǁ ɢǁ					
Click (top: velar; bottom: uvular)	Nasal lateral				ŋǁ ɴǁ					
