= Voicelessness =

Consonant pronounced without the larynx vibrating

Voiceless

◌̥

◌̊

Encoding
- Entity (decimal): &#805;&#778;
- Unicode (hex): U+0325 U+030A
- X-SAMPA: _0
Image

In linguistics, voicelessness is the property of sounds being pronounced without the larynx vibrating. Phonologically, it is a type of phonation, which contrasts with other states of the larynx, but some object that the word phonation implies voicing and that voicelessness is the lack of phonation.

The International Phonetic Alphabet (IPA) has distinct letters for many voiceless and modally voiced pairs of consonants (the obstruents), such as [p b], [t d], [c ɟ], [k ɡ], [q ɢ], [f v], and [s z]. Also, there are diacritics for voicelessness, U+0325 ◌̥ COMBINING RING BELOW and U+030A ◌̊ COMBINING RING ABOVE, which is used for letters with a descender. Diacritics are typically used with letters for prototypically voiced sounds, such as vowels and sonorant consonants: [ḁ], [l̥], [ŋ̊]. In Russian use of the IPA, the voicing diacritic may be turned for voicelessness, e.g. ⟨ṋ⟩.

== Voiceless vowels and other sonorants ==
Sonorants are sounds such as vowels and nasals that are voiced in most of the world's languages. However, in some languages sonorants may be voiceless, usually allophonically. For example, the Japanese word sukiyaki is pronounced [sɯ̥kijaki] and may sound like [skijaki] to an English speaker, but the lips can be seen to compress for the [ɯ̥]. Something similar happens in English words like peculiar [pʰə̥ˈkj̊uːliɚ] and potato [pʰə̥ˈtʰeɪ̯ɾoʊ̯].

Voiceless vowels are also an areal feature in languages of the American Southwest (like Hopi and Keres), the Great Basin (including all Numic languages), and the Great Plains, where they are present in Numic Comanche but also in Algonquian Cheyenne, and the Caddoan language Arikara. It also occurs in Woleaian, in contrast to the other Micronesian languages, which instead delete it outright.

Contrastively voiceless vowels have been reported several times without ever being verified.

Sonorants may also be contrastively, not just environmentally, voiceless. Standard Tibetan, for example, has a voiceless /l̥/ in Lhasa, which sounds similar to but is less noisy than the voiceless lateral fricative /ɬ/ in Welsh; it contrasts with a modally voiced /l/. Welsh contrasts several voiceless sonorants: /m, m̥/, /n, n̥/, /ŋ, ŋ̊/, and /r, r̥/, the last represented by "rh".

In Moksha, there is a voiceless palatal approximant /j̊/ (written in Cyrillic as ⟨йх⟩ jh) along with /l̥/ and /r̥/ (written as ⟨лх⟩ lh and ⟨рх⟩ rh). The last two have palatalized counterparts /l̥ʲ/ and /r̥ʲ/ (⟨льх⟩ and ⟨рьх⟩). Kildin Sami has also /j̊/ ⟨ҋ⟩.

== Lack of voicing contrast in obstruents ==
Many languages lack a distinction between voiced and voiceless obstruents (stops, affricates, and fricatives). This is the case in nearly all Australian languages, and is widespread elsewhere, for example in Mandarin Chinese, Korean, Danish, Estonian and the Polynesian languages.

In many such languages, obstruents are realized as voiced in voiced environments, such as between vowels or between a vowel and a nasal, and voiceless elsewhere, such as at the beginning or end of the word or next to another obstruent. That is the case in Dravidian and Australian languages and in Korean but not in Mandarin or Polynesian. Usually, the variable sounds are transcribed with the voiceless IPA letters, but for Australian languages, the letters for voiced consonants are often used.

It appears that voicelessness is not a single phenomenon in such languages. In some, such as the Polynesian languages, the vocal folds are required to actively open to allow an unimpeded (silent) airstream, which is sometimes called a breathed phonation (not to be confused with breathy voice). In others, such as many Australian languages, voicing ceases during the hold of a stop (few Australian languages have any other kind of obstruent) because airflow is insufficient to sustain it, and if the vocal folds open, that is only from passive relaxation.

Thus, Polynesian stops are reported to be held for longer than Australian stops and are seldom voiced, but Australian stops are prone to having voiced variants (L&M 1996:53), and the languages are often represented as having no phonemically voiceless consonants at all.

In Southeast Asia, when stops occur at the end of a word, they are voiceless because the glottis is closed, not open, so they are said to be unphonated (have no phonation) by some phoneticians, who considered "breathed" voicelessness to be a phonation.

Yidiny consonants have no underlyingly voiceless consonants.
