= Tone number =

Numbers assigned to tone types in tonal languages

Tone numbers are numerical digits used like letters to mark the tones of a language. The number is usually placed after a romanized syllable. There is no particular correlation to the actual pitch of the tone. Tone numbers are only defined for a particular language, or for a family of languages that share a common ancestor that had the set of tones indicated by the numbers, which are shared by the descendant languages.

Other means of indicating tone in romanization include diacritics, tone letters, and orthographic changes to the consonants or vowels. For instance, in Mandarin, the syllable 馬 (which has a falling-rising tone) is represented in Wade–Giles romanization as ma³, with a tone number; in Hanyu Pinyin as mǎ, with a diacritic; and in Gwoyeu Romatzyh as maa, with a change in the vowel letter.

== In Chinese ==
In the Chinese tradition, numbers, diacritics, and names are assigned to the historical four tones (level, rising, departing, and entering) of Chinese. These are consistent across all Chinese dialects, reflecting the development of tone diachronically. In the later stage of Middle Chinese, voiced consonants (such as b-, d-, g-, z-) began to merge into voiceless ones (p-, t-, k-, s-) and such voiceless-voiced consonant contrast was substituted by further high-low pitch contrast (yin, and yang). It is also common to number the tones of a particular dialect independently of the others. For example, Standard Chinese has four–five tones and the digits 1–5 or 0–4 are assigned to them; Cantonese has 6–9 tones, and the digits from 0 or 1 to 6 or 9 are assigned to them. In this case, Mandarin tone 4 has nothing to do with Cantonese tone 4, as can be seen by comparing the tone charts of Standard Chinese (Mandarin), Cantonese, and Taiwanese Hokkien.

Middle Chinese (and all modern Chinese languages)
Tone number	1	2	3	4	5	6	7	8		
Tone name	Yin level	Yang level	Yin rising	Yang rising	Yin departing	Yang departing	Yin entering	Yang entering		
Modifier letter	꜀	꜁	꜂	꜃	꜄	꜅	꜆	꜇		
Mandarin
Tone number	1	2	3	4	5 or 0					
Tone name	Yin level	Yang level	Rising	Departing	Neutral					
Tone letter	˥	˧˥	˨˩˦	˥˩	depends on context					
Cantonese
Tone number	1	2	3	4	5	6	7 (1)	8 (3)	9 (6)	
Tone name	Yin level	Yin rising	Yin departing	Yang level	Yang rising	Yang departing	Upper yin entering	Lower yin entering	Yang entering	
Tone letter	˥, ˥˧	˧˥	˧	˨˩, ˩	˩˧	˨	˥	˧	˨	
Taiwanese Hokkien
Tone number	1	2	3	4	5	6	7	8	9	0
Tone name	Yin level	Yin rising	Yin departing	Yin entering	Yang level	Yang rising	Yang departing	Yang entering	High rising	Neutral
Tone letter	˥	˥˩	˧˩	˧	˨˦	˨	˧	˥	˧˥	depends on context

Note: Tone sandhi rules and the unstressed syllable of Mandarin are not listed here for simplicity.

To enhance recognition and learning, color has also been associated with the tones. Although there are no formal standards, the de facto standard has been to use red (tone 1), orange (tone 2), green (tone 3), blue (tone 4) and black (tone 5). This color palette has been implemented in translation tools and online dictionaries.

Although such numbers are useless in comparative studies, they are convenient for in-dialect descriptions:

- In Mandarin, the numeral "one", originally in tone 1, is pronounced in tone 4 if followed by a classifier in tone 1, 2, or 3. It is pronounced in tone 2 if the classifier has tone 4.
- In Taiwanese tone sandhi, tone 1 is pronounced as tone 7 if followed by another syllable in a polysyllabic word.

Some romanization schemes, like Jyutping, use tone numbers. Even for Pinyin, tone numbers are used instead when diacritics are not available, as in basic ASCII text.

For the numbers of the traditional tone classes, which are consistent between dialects, see four tones in Middle Chinese.

== See also ==
- Chinese characters
- Chinese language
- Bopomofo
- Tone letter
- Tone name
