= Modifier letter double apostrophe =

Glyph used in Nenets and Dan

modifier letter double apostrophe
- ˮ

Usage
- Writing system: Cyrillic, Latin
- Type: Alphabetic
- Sound values: [ʔ]

The modifier letter double apostrophe (ˮ) is a spacing glyph. It is used in the orthography of Tundra Nenets to denote a glottal stop, in the Enets and Nganasan alphabets and in the orthography of Dan to indicate that a syllable has a top tone. It is encoded at U+02EE ˮ MODIFIER LETTER DOUBLE APOSTROPHE.

== See also ==
- single apostrophe U+02BC ʼ MODIFIER LETTER APOSTROPHE.
- Similar symbol U+0022 " QUOTATION MARK (&quot;, &QUOT;)
