= Tone letter =

Symbol or mark representing linguistic tone

Register tones (IPA)

˥ ˦ ˧ ˨ ˩ ꜒ ꜓ ꜔ ꜕ ꜖
- IPA number: 519 – 523
- Entity (decimal): &#741; – &#745;

Encoding
- Unicode (hex): U+02E5 – U+02E9

Level tones (IPA) ˥ ˧ ˩ ˥ ˩: Long level-tone letters are commonly used for non-checked syllables and short letters for checked syllables, though this is not an IPA distinction.	Rising and falling tones ˩˥ ˧˥ ˨˦ ˩˧ ˩˩˧ ˥˩ ˥˧ ˦˨ ˧˩ ˥˥˧ Peaking and dipping tones ˩˥˧ ˧˥˩ ˧˥˧ ˩˧˩ ˥˩˧ ˧˩˥ ˥˧˥ ˧˩˧ ˨˦˨ ˦˨˦ ˨˩˧ ˧˦˨: Contour-tone letters are composed as sequences: ˥ ˧ → ˥˧, ˧ ˩ ˧ → ˧˩˧

Tone letters are letters that represent the tones of a language, most commonly in languages with contour tones. They are used both in language orthographies, such as Hmong, and phonetic transcription, such as the IPA.

== Chao tone letters (IPA) ==
The tone contours of Mandarin Chinese. In the convention for Chinese, 1 is low and 5 is high. The corresponding tone letters are ˥ , ˧˥ , ˨˩˦ , ˥˩.

A series of iconic tone letters based on a musical staff was devised by Yuen Ren Chao in the 1920s by adding a reference stave to the existing convention of the International Phonetic Alphabet. The stave was adopted by the IPA as an option in 1989 and is now nearly universal. When the contours had been drawn without a staff, it was difficult to discern subtle distinction in pitch. Only nine or so of the possible tones were commonly distinguished: high, medium and low level, [ˉa ˗a ˍa] (or as dots rather than macrons for 'unaccented' tones); high rising and falling, [ˊa ˋa]; low rising and falling, [ˏa ˎa]; and peaking and dipping, [ˆa ˇa], though more precise notation was found and the IPA specifically provided for mid rising and falling tones if needed. The Chao tone letters were originally x-height, but are now taller to make distinctions in pitch more visible.

Combinations of the Chao tone letters form schematics of the pitch contour of a tone, mapping the pitch in the letter space and ending in a vertical bar. For example, [ma˨˩˦] represents the mid-dipping pitch contour of the Chinese word for horse, 馬／马 mǎ. Single tone letters differentiate up to five pitch levels: ˥ 'extra high' or 'top', ˦ 'high', ˧ 'mid', ˨ 'low', and ˩ 'extra low' or 'bottom'. No language is known to depend on more than five levels of pitch.

These letters are most commonly written at the end of a syllable. For example, Standard Mandarin has the following four tones in syllables spoken in isolation:

Tone description	Tone letter	IPA tone diacritic	Chao tone numerals	Tone number	Pinyin	Traditional Chinese	Simplified Chinese	Gloss
High level	ma˥	má	ma^{55}	ma^{1}	mā	媽	妈	mother
Mid rising	ma˧˥	ma᷄	ma^{35}	ma^{2}	má	麻	麻	hemp
Low (dipping)	ma˨˩˦	ma᷉	ma^{214}	ma^{3}	mǎ	馬	马	horse
High falling	ma˥˩	mâ	ma^{51}	ma^{4}	mà	罵	骂	scold

For languages that have simple register tones in basic morphemes, or on short vowels, single tone letters are used for these, and the tone letters combine as the tones themselves do to form contours. For example, Yoruba has the three basic tones [˥ ˧ ˩] on short vowels and the six derived contour tones [˥˧ ˥˩ ˧˥ ˧˩ ˩˧ ˩˥] on long vowels, diphthongs and contractions. For languages that have basic contour tones, among these are level tones, and it is a common convention to use double tone letters for those level tones while using single tone letters for short checked tones, as in Taiwanese Hokkien [sã˥˥] vs [tit˥]. The tones [˥˥] and [˥] are generally analyzed as being the same phoneme, and the distinction reflects traditional Chinese classification; it also derives from the convention of numerically writing ⟨sã55⟩ for high level pitch vs ⟨sã5⟩ for tone #5. Regardless, this is not an IPA convention.

Chao tone letters are sometimes written before the syllable, in accordance with writing stress and downstep before the syllable, and as had been done with the unstaffed letters in the IPA before 1989. For example, the following passage transcribes the prosody of European Portuguese using tone letters alongside stress, upstep, and downstep in the same position before the syllable:

[u ꜛˈvẽtu ˈnɔɾtɯ kumɯˈso ɐ suˈpɾaɾ kõ ˈmũitɐ ˩˧fuɾiɐ | mɐʃ ꜛˈku̯ɐ̃tu maiʃ su˩˧pɾavɐ | maiz ꜛu viɐꜜˈʒɐ̃tɯ si ɐkõʃꜜˈɡava suɐ ˧˩kapɐ | ɐˈtɛ ꜛkiu ˈvẽtu ˈnɔɾtɯ ˧˩d̥z̥ʃtiu ǁ]

O vento norte começou a soprar com muita fúria, mas quanto mais soprava, mais o viajante se aconchegava à sua capa, até que o vento norte desistiu.

The two systems may be combined, with prosodic pitch written before a word or syllable and lexical tone after a word or syllable, since in the Sinological tradition the tone letters following a syllable are always purely lexical and disregard prosody.

Diacritics may also be used to transcribe tone in the IPA. For example, tone 3 in Mandarin is a low tone between other syllables, and can be represented as such phonemically. The four Mandarin tones can therefore be transcribed /má, mǎ, mà, mâ/. (These diacritics conflict with the conventions of Pinyin, which uses the pre-Kiel IPA diacritic conventions: ⟨mā, má, mǎ, mà⟩, respectively.)

There is not a one-to-one correspondence between Chao tone letters and the IPA tone diacritics, despite the simplistic presentation on the IPA chart. Two examples are given in the Report of the 1989 Kiel Convention, for languages with three and four register tones:

Illustration of 3-tone language
Diacritic	Letter
x́	˥
x̄	˧
x̀	˩

Illustration of 4-tone language
Diacritic	Letter
x̋	˥
x́	˦
x̀	˨
x̏	˩

As shown, the acute accent corresponds to the highest Chao tone letter in a 3-tone system, but to the 2nd-highest in a 4-tone system. However, even this is not absolute. For example, a four-tone language might be analyzed as having high, mid, low and extra-low tones, /x́ x̄ x̀ x̏/, or some other arrangement, but the tone letters could still reflect acoustic pitch independently of that analysis.

=== Reversed Chao tone letters ===
Reversed Chao tone letters indicate tone sandhi, with the right-stem letters on the left for the underlying tone, and left-stem ('reversed') letters on the right for the surface tone. For example, the Mandarin phrase nǐ /ni˨˩˦/ + hǎo /xaʊ˨˩˦/ > ní hǎo /ni˧˥xaʊ˨˩˦/ is transcribed:

⫽ni˨˩˦꜔꜒xaʊ˨˩˦⫽

Some transcribers use reversed tone letters to show that they apply to the following rather than the preceding syllable. For example, Kyoto Japanese ame 'rain' may be transcribed,

꜖a꜒꜔me

rather than a˩me˥˧.

Reversed tone letters were adopted by the IPA in 1989, though they do not appear in the space-limited IPA chart.

The phonetic realization of neutral tones are sometimes indicated by replacing the horizontal stroke with a dot: ⟨꜌ ꜋ ꜊ ꜉ ꜈⟩. When combined with tone sandhi, the same letters may have the stem on the left: ⟨꜑ ꜐ ꜏ ꜎ ꜍⟩. This is an extension of the pre-Kiel IPA convention of a dot placed at various heights to indicate the pitch of a reduced tone.

Chao defined the pitch trace as indicating a 'toneme' when to the left of the stave, and as a 'tone value' when to the right. However, 'tone value' is not precisely defined, and in his examples may be phonemic. His illustrations use left- and right-facing tone letters as follows:

- English jes꜓꜕, jes꜒꜖, jes꜕꜓, ɦjes꜖ etc: different intonations of the response 'yes'
- Cantonese i˩kɑ˦˨꜒: a phonemic change in tone due to sandhi in a compound word
- Lhasa Tibetan lɑ kɑ˩˧˩wɛ > lɑ꜖ kɑ꜔꜒wɛ꜕: the spread of an underlying peaking tone on kɑ across adjacent syllables

The Tibetan distinction is a phonemic-phonetic one; the Cantonese distinction is not.

== Capital-letter abbreviations ==
An abstract representation of relatively simple tone is often indicated with capital letters: H 'high', M 'mid', and L 'low'. A falling tone is then HM, HL, ML or more generally F, and a rising tone LM, MH, LH or more generally R. These may be presented by themselves (e.g. a rule H + M → F, or a word tone such as LL [two low-tone syllables]), or in combination with a CV transcription (e.g. a high-tone syllable /laH, laᴴ, Hla, ᴴla/ etc.).

== Numerical values ==
Tone letters are often transliterated as digits, particularly in Asian and Mesoamerican tone languages. Until the spread of OpenType computer fonts starting in 2000–2001, tone letters were not practical for many applications. A numerical substitute has been commonly used for tone contours, with a numerical value assigned to the beginning, end, and sometimes middle of the contour. For example, the four Mandarin tones are commonly transcribed as "ma55", "ma35", "ma214", "ma51".

However, such numerical systems are ambiguous. In Asian languages such as Chinese, convention assigns the lowest pitch a 1 and the highest a 5. Conversely, in Africa the lowest pitch is assigned a 5 and the highest a 1, barring a few exceptional cases with six tone levels, which may have the opposite convention of 1 being low and 6 being high. In the case of Mesoamerican languages, the highest pitch may be 1 but the lowest depends on the number of contrastive pitch levels in the language being transcribed. For example, an Otomanguean language with three level tones may denote them as 1 (high /˥/), 2 (mid /˧/) and 3 (low /˩/). (Three-tone systems occur in Mixtecan, Chinantecan and Amuzgoan languages.) A reader accustomed to Chinese usage will misinterpret the Mixtec low tone as mid, and the high tone as low. In Chatino, 0 is high and 4 is low. With some Omotic languages, 0 is low and 3 is high. Because Chao tone letters are iconic, and musical staves are internationally recognized as having high pitch at the top and low pitch at the bottom, tone letters do not suffer from this ambiguity.

Comparison of Sinologist, Africanist and Mesoamericanist tone numerals
	high-level	high-falling	mid-rising	mid-level	mid-falling	mid-dipping	low-level
Tone letter	˥	˥˩	˧˥	˧	˧˩	˨˩˦	˩
Asian convention	55	51	35	33	31	214	11
African convention	1	15	31	3	35	453	5
American convention (3 register tones)	1	13	21	2	23	232	3
Chatino	0	14	20	2	24	342	4

== Division of tone space ==
The International Phonetic Association suggests using the tone letters to represent phonemic contrasts. For example, if a language has a single falling tone, then it should be transcribed as /˥˩/, even if this tone does not fall across the entire pitch range.

For the purposes of a precise linguistic analysis there are at least three approaches: linear, exponential, and language-specific. A linear approach is to map the tone levels directly to fundamental frequency (f_{0}), by subtracting the tone with lowest f_{0} from the tone with highest f_{0}, and dividing this space into four equal f_{0} intervals. Tone letters are then chosen based on the f_{0} tone contours over this region. This linear approach is systematic, but it does not always align the beginning and end of each tone with the proposed tone levels. Chao's earlier description of the tone levels is an exponential approach. Chao proposed five tone levels, where each level is spaced two semitones apart. A later description provides only one semitone between levels 1 and 2, and three semitones between levels 2 and 3. This updated description may be a language-specific division of the tone space.

== IPA tone letters in Unicode ==
In Unicode, the IPA tone letters are encoded as follows:

Standard staved tone letters

- U+02E5 ˥ MODIFIER LETTER EXTRA-HIGH TONE BAR
- U+02E6 ˦ MODIFIER LETTER HIGH TONE BAR
- U+02E7 ˧ MODIFIER LETTER MID TONE BAR
- U+02E8 ˨ MODIFIER LETTER LOW TONE BAR
- U+02E9 ˩ MODIFIER LETTER EXTRA-LOW TONE BAR

Reversed tone letters

- U+A712 ꜒ MODIFIER LETTER EXTRA-HIGH LEFT-STEM TONE BAR
- U+A713 ꜓ MODIFIER LETTER HIGH LEFT-STEM TONE BAR
- U+A714 ꜔ MODIFIER LETTER MID LEFT-STEM TONE BAR
- U+A715 ꜕ MODIFIER LETTER LOW LEFT-STEM TONE BAR
- U+A716 ꜖ MODIFIER LETTER EXTRA-LOW LEFT-STEM TONE BAR

These are combined in sequence for contour tones; a supporting OpenType font will join them automatically.

The dotted tone letters are:

Dotted tone letters

- U+A708 ꜈ MODIFIER LETTER EXTRA-HIGH DOTTED TONE BAR
- U+A709 ꜉ MODIFIER LETTER HIGH DOTTED TONE BAR
- U+A70A ꜊ MODIFIER LETTER MID DOTTED TONE BAR
- U+A70B ꜋ MODIFIER LETTER LOW DOTTED TONE BAR
- U+A70C ꜌ MODIFIER LETTER EXTRA-LOW DOTTED TONE BAR

Reversed dotted tone letters

- U+A70D ꜍ MODIFIER LETTER EXTRA-HIGH DOTTED LEFT-STEM TONE BAR
- U+A70E ꜎ MODIFIER LETTER HIGH DOTTED LEFT-STEM TONE BAR
- U+A70F ꜏ MODIFIER LETTER MID DOTTED LEFT-STEM TONE BAR
- U+A710 ꜐ MODIFIER LETTER LOW DOTTED LEFT-STEM TONE BAR
- U+A711 ꜑ MODIFIER LETTER EXTRA-LOW DOTTED LEFT-STEM TONE BAR

Many of the IPA staveless tone letters (or at least approximations of them, depending on the font) are available in Unicode:

Default or high staveless tone letters

- U+02C9 ˉ MODIFIER LETTER MACRON
- U+02CA ˊ MODIFIER LETTER ACUTE ACCENT
- U+02CB ˋ MODIFIER LETTER GRAVE ACCENT
- U+02C6 ˆ MODIFIER LETTER CIRCUMFLEX ACCENT (&circ;)
- U+02C7 ˇ CARON (&caron;, &Hacek;)
- U+02DC ˜ SMALL TILDE (&DiacriticalTilde;, &tilde;)
- U+02D9 ˙ DOT ABOVE (&DiacriticalDot;, &dot;)

Mid staveless tone letters

- U+02D7 ˗ MODIFIER LETTER MINUS SIGN
- U+02F4 ˴ MODIFIER LETTER MIDDLE GRAVE ACCENT
- U+223C ∼ TILDE OPERATOR (&sim;, &thicksim;, &thksim;, &Tilde;)
- U+223D ∽ REVERSED TILDE (&backsim;, &bsim;)
- U+00B7 · MIDDLE DOT (&middot;, &CenterDot;, &centerdot;)

Low staveless tone letters

- U+02CD ˍ MODIFIER LETTER LOW MACRON
- U+02CF ˏ MODIFIER LETTER LOW ACUTE ACCENT
- U+02CE ˎ MODIFIER LETTER LOW GRAVE ACCENT
- U+A788 ꞈ MODIFIER LETTER LOW CIRCUMFLEX ACCENT
- U+02EC ˬ MODIFIER LETTER VOICING
- U+02F7 ˷ MODIFIER LETTER LOW TILDE
- U+2024 ․ ONE DOT LEADER

== Non-IPA systems ==
Although the phrase "tone letter" generally refers to the Chao system in the context of the IPA, there are also orthographies with letters assigned to individual tones, which may also be called tone letters.

=== UPA ===
The Uralic Phonetic Alphabet has marks resembling half brackets that indicate the beginning and end of high and low tone: mid tone ˹high tone˺ ˻low tone˼, also ꜠ high-pitch stress, ꜡ low-pitch stress.

=== Chinese ===
Besides phonemic tone systems, Chinese is commonly transcribed with four to eight historical tone categories. A mark is placed at a corner of a syllable for its category.

yin or default tones: ꜀píng, ꜂shǎng, qù꜄, ruʔ꜆
yang tones: ꜁píng, ꜃shǎng, qù꜅, ruʔ꜇

When the yin–yang distinction is not needed, the yin tone marks are used.

See also bopomofo.

=== Zhuang ===
In several systems, tone numbers are integrated into the orthography and so they are technically letters even though they continue to be called "numbers". However, in the case of Zhuang, the 1957 Chinese orthography modified the digits to make them graphically distinct from digits used numerically. Two letters were adopted from Cyrillic: ⟨з⟩ and ⟨ч⟩, replacing the similar-looking tone numbers ⟨3⟩ and ⟨4⟩. In 1982, these were replaced with Latin letters; one of which, ⟨h⟩, now doubles as both a consonant letter for /h/ and a tone letter for mid tone.

Zhuang tone letters
Tone number	Tone letter			Pitch number
Tone number	1957	1982	IPA	Pitch number
1	∅		˨˦	24
2	ƨ	z	˧˩	31
3	з	j	˥	55
4	ч	x	˦˨	42
5	ƽ	q	˧˥	35
6	ƅ	h	˧	33

=== Hmong and Unified Miao ===
The Hmong Romanized Popular Alphabet was devised in the early 1950s with Latin tone letters. Two of the 'tones' are more accurately called register, as tone is not their distinguishing feature. Several of the letters pull double duty representing consonants.

Hmong tone letters
Tone name	Tone letter	Example	
High	b	pob	/pɔ́/ 'ball'
Mid	∅	po	/pɔ/ 'spleen'
Low	s	pos	/pɔ̀/ 'thorn'
High falling	j	poj	/pɔ̂/ 'female'
Mid rising	v	pov	/pɔ̌/ 'to throw'
Creaky (low falling)	m	pom	/pɔ̰/ 'to see'
Creaky (low rising)	d	pod	/pɔ̰/ 'to see'
Breathy (mid-low)	g	pog	/pɔ̤/ 'grandmother'

(The low-rising creaky register is a phrase-final allophone of the low-falling register.)

A unified Miao alphabet used in China applies a different scheme:

Unified Miao
Tone number	Tone letter	IPA tone letter			
Tone number	Tone letter	Xong	Hmu	Hmong	Diandongbei; Miao
1	b	˧˥	˧	˦˧	˦˧
2	x	˧˩	˥	˧˩	˧˥
3	d	˦	˧˥	˥	˥
4	l	˧	˨	˨˩	˩
5	t	˥˧	˦	˦	˧
6	s	˦˨	˩˧	˨˦	˧˩
7	k	˦	˥˧	˧	˩
8	f	˧	˧˩	˩˧	˧˩

=== Chatino ===
In Highland Chatino, superscript capital A–L, ᴬ ᴮ ꟲ ᴰ ᴱ ꟳ ᴳ ᴴ ᴵ ᴶ ᴷ ᴸ, indicate pan-dialectical tone-cognate sets. The pronunciation will vary across dialects, and certain tones will be pronounced the same in some dialects but different in others, due to tone splits and conflations. Superscript capital M and S are used for tone sandhi.

=== Chinantec ===
Several ways of transcribing Chinantec tone have been developed. Linguists typically use superscripted numbers or IPA.

Ozumacín Chinantec uses the following diacritics:

⟨ˈ, ˉ, ˊ, ˋ, ꜗ, ꜘ, ꜙ, ꜚ⟩.

Sample: Jnäꜘ Paaˊ naˉhña̱a̱nˊ la̱a̱nˈ apóstol kya̱a̱ꜗ Jesucristo läꜙ hyohˉ dsëꜗ Dio. Ko̱ˉjø̱hꜘ kya̱a̱hˊ Sóstene ø̱ø̱hꜗ jneˊ.

=== Korean ===
In hangul and sometimes Romanized transcription, ⟨〮⟩ and ⟨〯⟩ are used for historical vowel length and pitch accent.

=== Lahu and Akha ===
The related Lahu and Akha use the following spacing diacritic marks, which occur at the end of a syllable. Mid tone is not marked:

Letter	Akha value	Lahu value
	mid	mid
ˇ	high	high falling
ˆ	mid glottalized	high checked
ˬ	low	low falling
ꞈ	low glottalized	low checked
ˉ		high rising
ˍ		very low

Sample: Ngaˬ˗ahˇ hawˬ maˬ mehꞈ nya si ...

=== Ethiopic ===
Ethiopic tone marks are printed at 1/4 scale in the line above each letter, analogous to ruby text. They are:

᎐ yizet
᎑ deret
᎒ rikrik
᎓ short rikrik
᎔ difat
᎕ kenat
᎖ chiret
᎗ hidet
᎘ deret-hidet
᎙ kurt

== See also ==
- Tone (linguistics)#Phonetic notation
- Thai alphabet#Tone
- Tone (linguistics)
- Tone contour
- Tone number
- Tone name
- Tone (disambiguation)
- Four tones (Middle Chinese) for traditional Chinese notation
