= Modifier letter apostrophe =

Phonetic modifier letter (ʼ)

- ʼ

Usage
- Writing system: Cyrillic, Latin, Devanagari
- Type: alphabetic
- Language of origin: International Phonetic Alphabet, Nenets language, Kildin Sámi, Boro, Dogri
- Sound values: [ʔ], [ʰ]

The modifier letter apostrophe (ʼ) is a letter found in Unicode encoding, used primarily for various glottal sounds. It was used for the apostrophe in early Unicode versions.

== Encoding ==
The letter apostrophe is encoded at U+02BC ʼ MODIFIER LETTER APOSTROPHE, which is in the Spacing Modifier Letters Unicode block.

In Unicode code charts it looks identical to the U+2019 ’ RIGHT SINGLE QUOTATION MARK, but this is not true for all fonts. The primary difference between the letter apostrophe and U+2019 is that the letter apostrophe U+02BC has the Unicode General Category "Letter, modifier" (Lm), while U+2019 has the category "Punctuation, Final quote" (Pf).

== Use ==
In early Unicode (versions 1.0–2.1.9) U+02BC was preferred for the punctuation apostrophe in English. Since version 3.0.0, however, U+2019 is preferred due to vast amounts of existing text written in character sets that unified the apostrophe and the single close quote characters. This does make searching for words with apostrophes in them somewhat harder.

In the International Phonetic Alphabet, it is used to express ejective consonants, such as [kʼ] and [tʼ].

It denotes a glottal stop [ʔ] in orthographies of many languages, such as Nenets (in Cyrillic script) and the artificial Klingon language.

In one version of the Kildin Sami alphabet, it denotes preaspiration.

In the Ukrainian alphabet and in the Belarusian alphabet, U+02BC is used for the semi-letter 'apostrophe' (which plays a role similar to Russian ⟨ъ⟩) in certain contexts, such as, for example, in internationalized domain names where a punctuation mark would be disallowed.

In Bodo and Dogri written in Devanagari, it marks high tone and low-rising tone on short vowels, respectively.

== See also ==
- Apostrophe
- Hamza
- Modifier letter double apostrophe
- Modifier letter turned comma
- Saltillo and ʻOkina, other letters used for glottal stop
- Spacing Modifier Letters
