= Modifier letter right half ring =

Unicode modifier letter

ʾo

Modifier letter right half ring
- U+02BE ʾ MODIFIER LETTER RIGHT HALF RING.

See also
- Modifier letter left half ring

The modifier letter right half ring (ʾ) is a character found in Unicode in the Spacing Modifier Letters range (although it is not a modifier, but a standalone grapheme). It is used in romanization to transliterate the Semitic abjad letter aleph and the Arabic letter hamza after it was used by The Encyclopedia of Islam (later the International Journal of Middle East Studies), representing the sound /ʔ/ (a glottal stop, as in Arabic ء hamza or Hebrew א alef). In informal contexts, the backtick ⟨`⟩ or the apostrophe ⟨'⟩ is commonly used as a substitute; but this can lead to confusion with the modifier letter left half ring.

== See also ==
- Half ring
- Glottal stop (letter)
- Spiritus lenis – Diacritical mark used in polytonic orthography
- Sicilicus – Diacritical mark in old Latin
