= R-colored vowel =

Phonetic sound in some languages

◌˞

ɚ

ɝ

ɹ̩

ɻ̍
- IPA number: 327

Audio sample
- source · help

Encoding
- Entity (decimal): &#734;&#602;&#605;
- Unicode (hex): U+02DE U+025A U+025D
- X-SAMPA: @` 3`

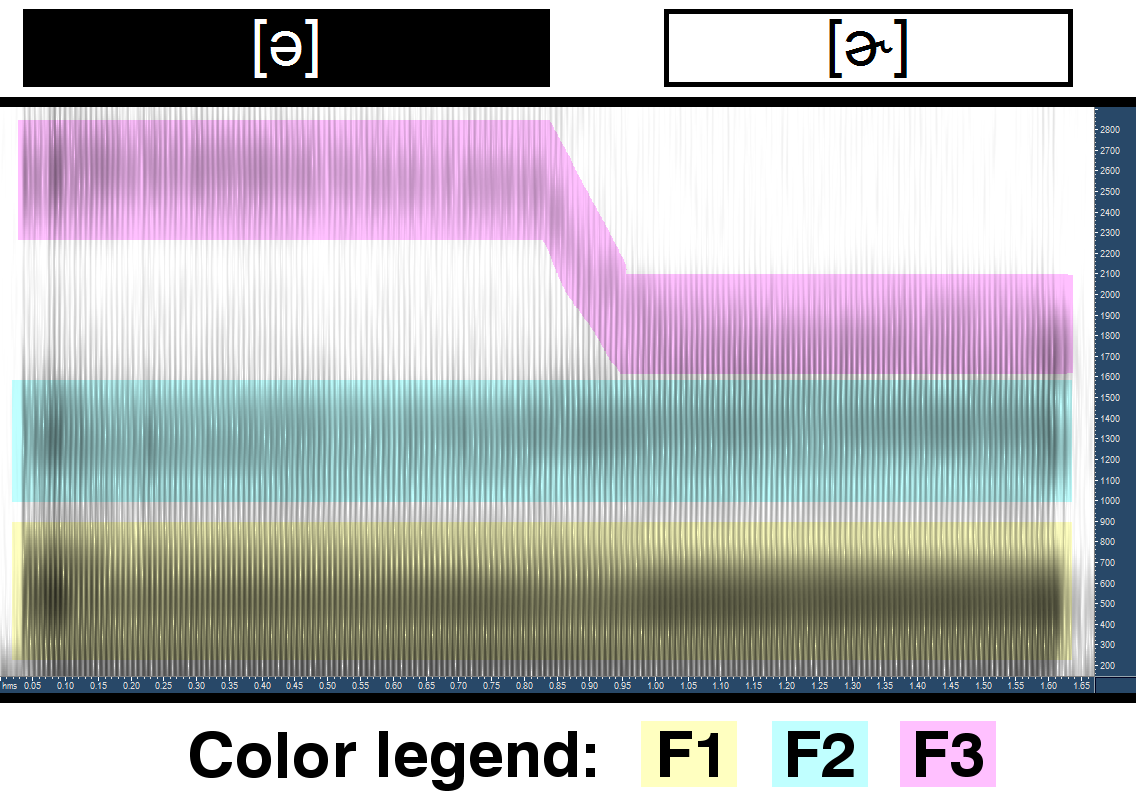
Spectrogram of [ə] and its rhotacized counterpart [ɚ].

Sound sample of regular and r-colored schwa

An R-colored, or rhotic, vowel (Note: Also referred to as a retroflex vowel, vocalic R, or rhotacized vowel. When teaching the concept to children, it is called a bossy R.) is a vowel that is modified in a way that results in a lowering in frequency of the third formant. R-colored vowels can be articulated in various ways: the tip or blade of the tongue may be turned up during at least part of the articulation of the vowel (a retroflex articulation) or the back of the tongue may be bunched. In addition, the vocal tract may often be constricted in the region of the epiglottis.

R-colored vowels occur in less than one percent of all languages. However, they occur in two of the most widely spoken languages: North American English and many varieties of Mandarin Chinese. In North American English, they are found in words such as dollar, butter, third, color, and nurse. They also occur in Canadian French, some varieties of Portuguese, some Jutlandic dialects of Danish, and in a few indigenous languages of the Americas and of Asia, including Serrano and Yurok in the United States, Luobohe Miao in China, Katë in Afghanistan, and Badaga in India.

== Transcription practices ==
In the IPA, an r-colored vowel is indicated by a hook diacritic ⟨˞⟩ placed to the right of the regular symbol for the vowel. For example, the IPA symbol for schwa is ⟨ə⟩, while the IPA symbol for an r-colored schwa is ⟨ɚ⟩. Similarly, the IPA symbol for the open-mid central unrounded vowel is ⟨ɜ⟩, while an r-colored open-mid central unrounded vowel is ⟨ɝ⟩. This diacritic is the hook of ⟨ɚ⟩ or ⟨ɝ⟩, symbols constructed by John Samuel Kenyon along with ⟨ᶔ⟩ by adding the retroflex hook (right hook) to ⟨ə⟩ and ⟨ɜ⟩. Both ⟨ɚ⟩ and ⟨ɝ⟩ were proposed as IPA symbols by the editors of American Speech in 1939 to distinguish it from [əɹ].

The IPA adopted several ways to transcribe r-colored vowels in its 1947 chart: the turned r ⟨ɹ⟩; the superscript turned r ⟨əʴ⟩, ⟨aʴ⟩, ⟨eʴ⟩, ⟨ɔʴ⟩, etc.; the retroflex hook ⟨ᶕ⟩, ⟨ᶏ⟩, ⟨ᶒ⟩, ⟨ᶗ⟩, etc.; and added ⟨ɚ⟩ as a variant of ⟨ᶕ⟩ in its 1951 chart. In 1976 the retroflex hook was dropped due to insufficient usage. In 1989, at the Kiel Convention, the hook of ⟨ɚ⟩ and ⟨ɝ⟩ was adopted as a diacritic placed on the right side of the vowel symbol for r-colored vowels, e.g. ⟨ɛ˞ o˞ ɔ˞⟩. Following the convention of alternating ⟨ɜ⟩ and ⟨ə⟩ for non-rhotic accents, in some English adaptations of IPA, ⟨ɝ⟩ and ⟨ɚ⟩ signify stressed and unstressed, respectively, rather than a difference in phonetic quality. The use of the superscript turned r (əʴ) is still commonly seen.

== Examples ==
=== English ===
Comparison of hiatus, consonantal /r/, and r-colored vowels in American English

R-colored vowels are found in most rhotic forms of English, including General American and Irish English. The r-colored vowels of General American can be written with "vowel-r" diacritic:

- [ɚ]: hearse, assert, mirth (stressed, conventionally written [ɝ]); standard, dinner, Lincolnshire (unstressed)
- [ɑ˞]: start, car
- [ɔ˞]: north, war

In words such as start, many speakers have r-coloring only in the coda of the vowel, rather than as a simultaneous articulation modifying the whole duration. This can be represented in IPA by using a succession of two symbols such as [ɑɚ̯] or [ɑɹ], rather than the unitary symbol [ɑ˞].

==== Singing ====
In European classical singing, dropping or weakening of r-colored vowels has been nearly universal and is a standard part of classical vocal training. However, there have always been other singing styles in which r-colored vowels are given their full emphasis, including traditional Irish singing styles and those of many performers of country music. Certain post-grunge singers made heavy use of this technique to such an extent that many people derisively exaggerated this tendency when referencing their music. In certain particular cases, a vowel + /r/ is pronounced instead as two syllables: a non-rhotic vowel followed by a syllabic /r/.

=== Mandarin Chinese ===
In Mandarin, the rhotacized ending of some words is the prime way by which to distinguish speakers of Standard Northern Mandarin (Beijing Mandarin) and Southwestern Mandarin from those of other forms of Mandarin in China. Mandarin speakers call this phenomenon erhua. In many words, the -r suffix (simplified Chinese: 儿; traditional Chinese: 兒) is added to indicate some meaning changes. If the word ends in a velar nasal (ng), the final consonant is lost and the vowel becomes nasalized. Major cities that have this form of rhotacized ending include Beijing, Tianjin, Tangshan, Shenyang, Changchun, Jilin, Harbin, and Qiqihar. This erhua has since spread to other provincial capitals not home to Standard Mandarin, such as Shijiazhuang, Jinan, Xi'an, Chongqing, and Chengdu.

In rhotic accents of Standard Mandarin, such as those from Beijing, Tianjin, most of the Hebei province (e.g. Tangshan, Baoding, Chengde), eastern Inner Mongolia (e.g. Chifeng, Hailar), and in the Northeast, vocalic r occurs as a diminutive marker of nouns (pinyin: ér) and the perfective aspect particle (了; le). This also occurs in the middle syllables of compound words consisting of three or more syllables. For example, the name of the famous restaurant Go Believe (狗不理) in Tianjin is pronounced as 'Gourbli' (Gǒu(r)b~~ù~~lǐ → Gǒurblǐ). The name of the street Dazhalan (大栅栏) in Beijing is pronounced as 'Da-shi-lar' (Dàshà~~n~~là~~n~~(r) → Dàshílàr).

=== Quebec French ===
In Quebec French, the vowel /œ̃/ is generally pronounced [œ̃˞] and the r-colored vowels are also pronounced in loan words. For example, the word hamburger can be pronounced [ɑ̃bɚɡɚ] and the word soccer can be pronounced [sokɚ].

The vowel /ø/ may be pronounced as [ø˞] in open and closed syllables: jeu [ʒø˞], feutre [fø˞ːtʁ̥].

=== Other examples ===
In the 1930s, the Dravidian language Badaga had two degrees of rhoticity among all five of its vowels, but few speakers maintain the distinction today, and only in one or two vowels. An example is non-rhotic [be] "mouth", slightly rhotacized ("half retroflexed") [be˞] "bangle", and fully rhotacized ("fully retroflexed") [be˞˞] "crop".

The Algic language Yurok illustrated rhotic vowel harmony. The non-high vowels /a/, /e/ and /o/ could become /ɚ/ in a word that has /ɚ/. For example, the root /nahks-/ 'three' became /nɚhks-/ in the word /nɚhksɚʔɚjɬ/ 'three (animals or birds)'.

Luobohe Miao also contains [ɚ].

Katë, a Nuristani language, alongside neighboring languages such as Indo-Aryan Kalasha, has a rhotic vowel denoted as /ɘ˞/.

== See also ==
- Linking R
- Rhotic consonant (r-like)
- Syllabic consonant

Place →	Labial					Coronal										Dorsal					Laryngeal			
Manner ↓	Bilabial		Labiodental		Linguolabial		Dental		Alveolar		Postalveolar		Retroflex		(Alveolo-)palatal		Velar		Uvular		Pharyngeal/epiglottal		Glottal	
Nasal	m̥	m	ɱ̊	ɱ		n̼	n̪̊	n̪	n̥	n	n̠̊	n̠	ɳ̊	ɳ	ɲ̊	ɲ	ŋ̊	ŋ	ɴ̥	ɴ				
Plosive	p	b	p̪	b̪	t̼	d̼	t̪	d̪	t	d			ʈ	ɖ	c	ɟ	k	ɡ	q	ɢ	ʡ		ʔ	
Sibilant affricate							t̪s̪	d̪z̪	ts	dz	t̠ʃ	d̠ʒ	tʂ	dʐ	tɕ	dʑ								
Non-sibilant affricate	pɸ	bβ	p̪f	b̪v			t̪θ	d̪ð	tɹ̝̊	dɹ̝	t̠ɹ̠̊˔	d̠ɹ̠˔			cç	ɟʝ	kx	ɡɣ	qχ	ɢʁ	ʡʜ	ʡʢ	ʔh	
Sibilant fricative							s̪	z̪	s	z	ʃ	ʒ	ʂ	ʐ	ɕ	ʑ								
Non-sibilant fricative	ɸ	β	f	v	θ̼	ð̼	θ	ð	θ̠	ð̠	ɹ̠̊˔	ɹ̠˔	ɻ̊˔	ɻ˔	ç	ʝ	x	ɣ	χ	ʁ	ħ	ʕ	h	ɦ
Approximant		β̞		ʋ				ð̞		ɹ		ɹ̠		ɻ		j		ɰ						˷
Tap/flap		ⱱ̟		ⱱ					ɾ̥	ɾ			ɽ̊	ɽ						ɢ̆		ʡ̆		
Trill	ʙ̥	ʙ							r̥	r		r̠	ɽ̊r̥	ɽr					ʀ̥	ʀ	ʜ	ʢ		
Lateral affricate									tɬ	dɮ			tꞎ	d𝼅	c𝼆	ɟʎ̝	k𝼄	ɡʟ̝						
Lateral fricative							ɬ̪		ɬ	ɮ			ꞎ	𝼅	𝼆	ʎ̝	𝼄	ʟ̝						
Lateral approximant								l̪	l̥	l		l̠	ɭ̊	ɭ	ʎ̥	ʎ	ʟ̥	ʟ		ʟ̠				
Lateral tap/flap									ɺ̥	ɺ			𝼈̊	𝼈		ʎ̆		ʟ̆						

		BL	LD	D	A	PA	RF	P	V	U
Implosive	Voiced	ɓ			ɗ		ᶑ	ʄ	ɠ	ʛ
Implosive	Voiceless	ɓ̥			ɗ̥		ᶑ̊	ʄ̊	ɠ̊	ʛ̥
Ejective	Stop	pʼ			tʼ		ʈʼ	cʼ	kʼ	qʼ
Ejective	Affricate		p̪fʼ	tθʼ	tsʼ	tʃʼ	tʂʼ	tɕʼ	kxʼ	qχʼ
Ejective	Fricative	ɸʼ	fʼ	θʼ	sʼ	ʃʼ	ʂʼ	ɕʼ	xʼ	χʼ
Ejective	Lateral affricate				tɬʼ			c𝼆ʼ	k𝼄ʼ	q𝼄ʼ
Ejective	Lateral fricative				ɬʼ					
Click (top: velar; bottom: uvular)	Tenuis	kʘ qʘ		kǀ qǀ	kǃ qǃ		k𝼊 q𝼊	kǂ qǂ		
Click (top: velar; bottom: uvular)	Voiced	ɡʘ ɢʘ		ɡǀ ɢǀ	ɡǃ ɢǃ		ɡ𝼊 ɢ𝼊	ɡǂ ɢǂ		
Click (top: velar; bottom: uvular)	Nasal	ŋʘ ɴʘ		ŋǀ ɴǀ	ŋǃ ɴǃ		ŋ𝼊 ɴ𝼊	ŋǂ ɴǂ	ʞ	
Click (top: velar; bottom: uvular)	Tenuis lateral				kǁ qǁ					
Click (top: velar; bottom: uvular)	Voiced lateral				ɡǁ ɢǁ					
Click (top: velar; bottom: uvular)	Nasal lateral				ŋǁ ɴǁ					
