= Modifier letter left half ring =

Unicode symbol U+02BF

ʿo

Modifier letter left half ring
- U+02BF ʿ MODIFIER LETTER LEFT HALF RING.

See also
- U+02BE ʾ MODIFIER LETTER RIGHT HALF RING; U+0351 ◌͑ COMBINING LEFT HALF RING ABOVE; U+0357 ◌͗ COMBINING RIGHT HALF RING ABOVE

The modifier letter left half ring ⟨ʿ⟩ is a character found in Unicode in the Spacing Modifier Letters range (although it is not a modifier, but a standalone grapheme). It is used in romanization to transliterate the Semitic abjad letter ayin after it was used by The Encyclopedia of Islam (later the International Journal of Middle East Studies), representing the sound /ʕ/ (a voiced pharyngeal fricative, as in Arabic ع ʿayn). In informal contexts, the backtick ⟨`⟩ or the apostrophe ⟨'⟩ is commonly used as a substitute, but this can lead to confusion with the modifier letter right half ring.

== See also ==
- Modifier letter right half ring
- Half ring
- Apostrophe
- Spiritus asper
