= St James' Park =

Football stadium in Newcastle upon Tyne, England

Coordinates: 54°58′32″N 1°37′18″W

St. James' Park
- 'The Cathedral on the Hill'

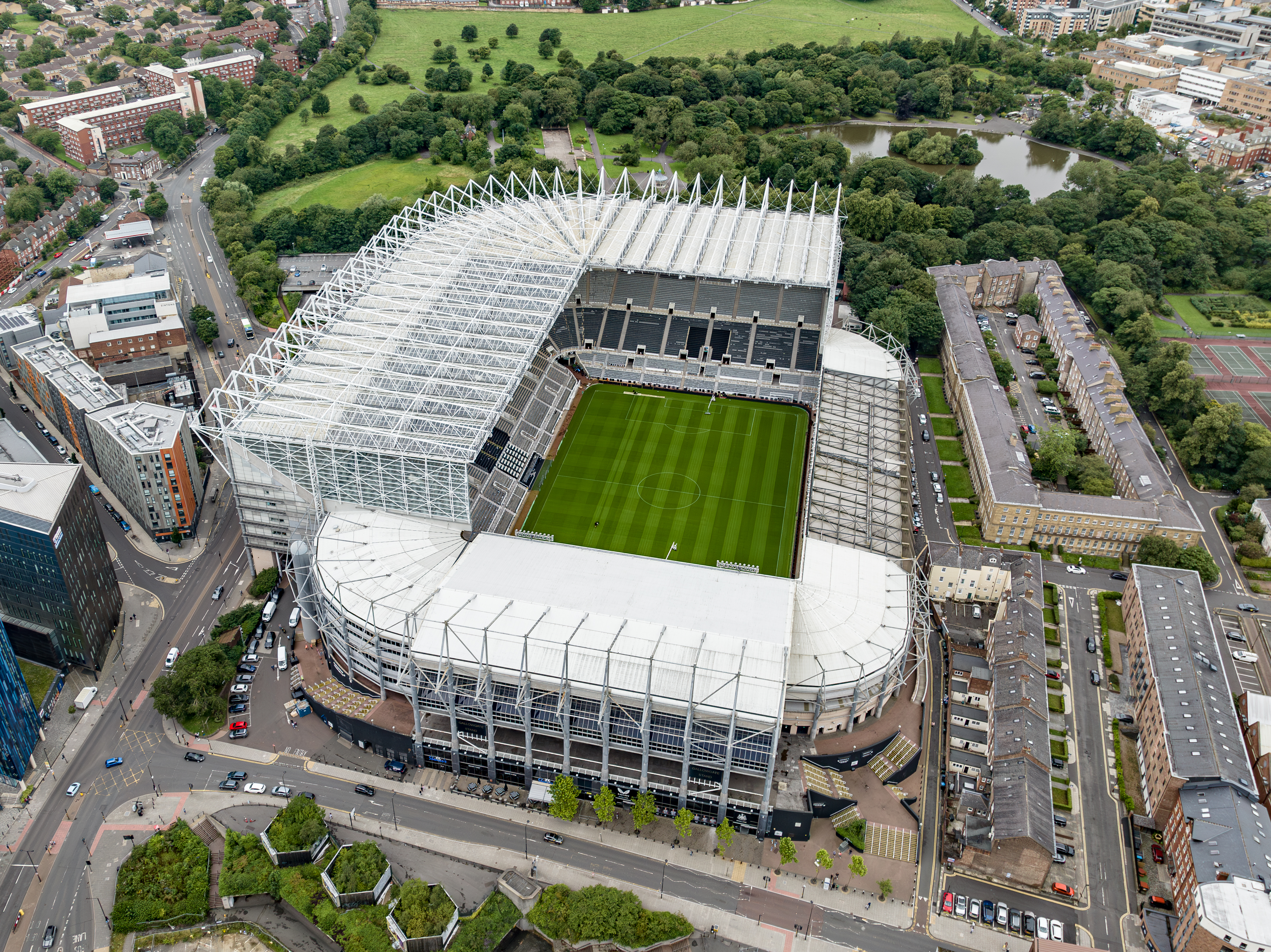
- UEFA
- Interactive map of St. James' Park
- Full name: St. James' Park
- Address: Barrack Road
- Location: Newcastle upon Tyne, England; NE1 4ST
- Owner: Newcastle City Council
- Capacity: 52,719
- Surface: Grass (Desso GrassMaster)
- Field size: 105 by 68 metres (114.8 yd × 74.4 yd)
- Public transit: St James; Newcastle

Construction
- Opened: 1892
- Renovated: 1986–1987, 1992–1995, 1998–2000
- Architects: TTH Architects, Gateshead

Tenants
- Newcastle Rangers F.C. (1880–1882, 1884); Newcastle West End F.C. (1886–1892); Newcastle East End F.C. (1892); Newcastle United (1892–present)

St. James' Park is a football stadium in Newcastle upon Tyne, England. It is the home of Newcastle United. With a seating capacity of 52,719, it is the 9th largest football stadium in England.

St. James' Park has been the home ground of Newcastle United since 1892 and has been used for football since 1880. Throughout its history, the desire for expansion has caused conflict with local residents and the local council. This has led to proposals to move at least twice in the late 1960s, and a controversial 1995 proposed move to nearby Leazes Park. Reluctance to move has led to the distinctive lop-sided appearance of the present-day stadium's asymmetrical stands.

Besides club football, in recent years St. James' Park has also been used for international football friendlies, the 2012 Olympics, the Rugby League Magic Weekend, the 2015 Rugby Union World Cup Premiership, England Rugby Union Test matches, Club Rugby Union matches, charity football events, live music gigs (such as Bob Dylan and Sam Fender) and as a set for film and reality television. St James' Park is also set to be one of the host stadia for Euro 2028.

== History ==
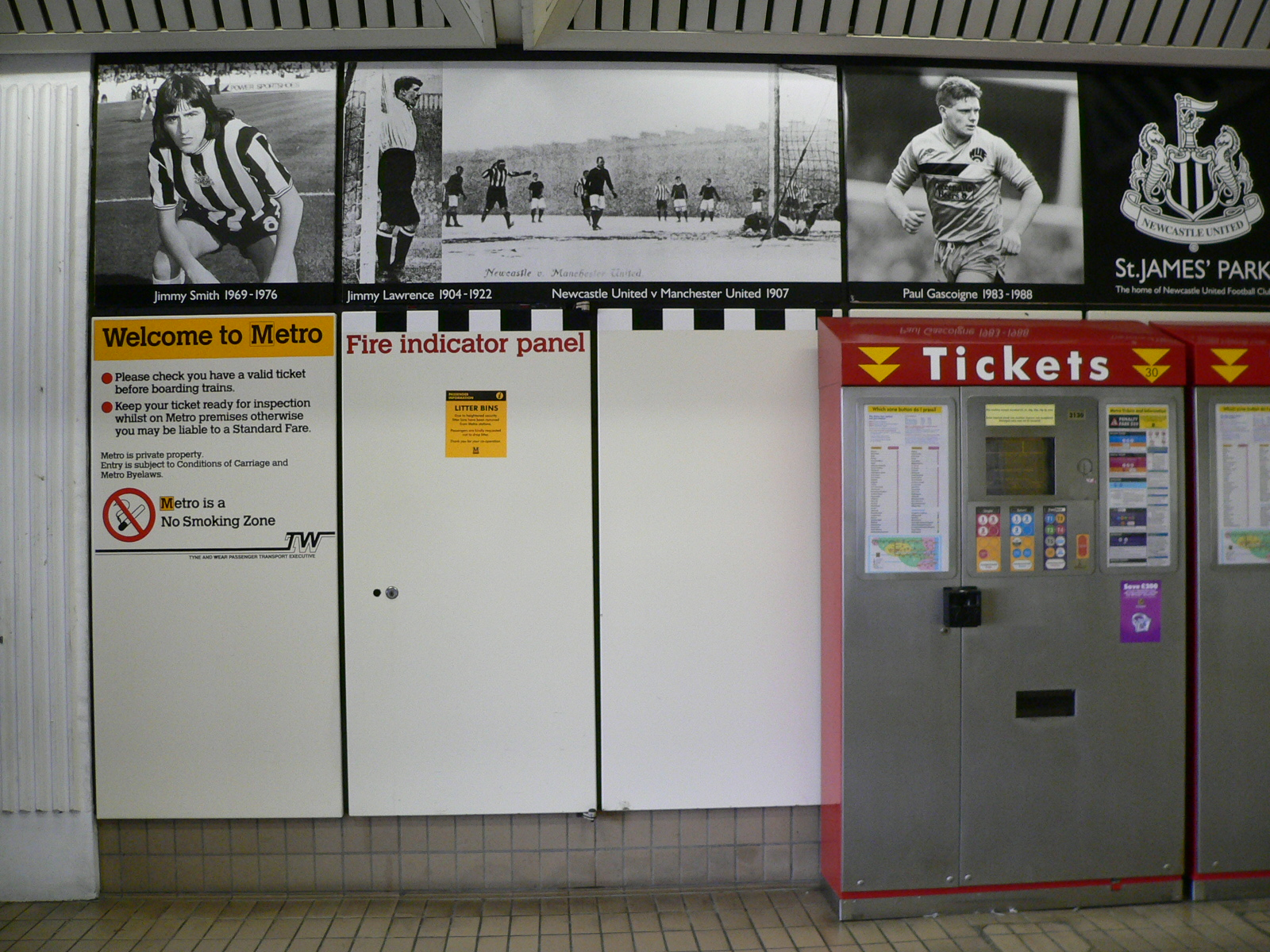
The St James Metro station ticket hall carries artwork depicting a timeline of the history of Newcastle United

=== Early history ===
The site of St. James' Park was originally a patch of sloping grazing land, bordered by Georgian Leazes Terrace, and near the historic Town Moor, owned by the Freemen of the city, both factors that later affected development of the ground, with the local council being the landlord of the site. Leazes Terrace was built c1830 by notable Newcastle residents, architect Thomas Oliver and builder Richard Grainger. Once the residence of high society in Newcastle, it is now a Grade I listed building, and, recently refurbished, is currently being used as self-catering postgraduate student accommodation by Newcastle University. The site was also near the gallows of the city, last used in 1844, lending the Gallowgate End its name.

The first football team to play at St. James' Park was Newcastle Rangers in 1880. They moved to a ground at Byker in 1882, then returned briefly to St. James' Park in 1884 before folding that year. Newcastle West End took over the ground in 1886. West End were wound up in 1892 and effectively merged into their rivals Newcastle East End, who took over the lease of St. James' Park and became Newcastle United later that year. On 3 September 1892, Newcastle East End played its first game on the football ground. Local residents opposition to football being played at St. James' dated back to the first games in the Football League following the building of the first small stand at the Gallowgate End. A redeveloped Gallowgate and further stands followed in 1899, bringing the first official capacity to 30,000 (standing).

While the stadium is now synonymous with the Black and White of the magpies, Newcastle United actually played in red and white at St. James' Park until 1904. In 1905, a doubling of capacity to 60,000, with a main stand on the Barrack Road (now Milburn Stand), and major other stands, produced a state-of-the-art facility, even boasting a swimming pool.

The second-ever rugby league test match, and first test victory by Great Britain, was played at the ground in 1908 against the touring Australian Kangaroos side on 23 January 1909.

=== 1920–1990 ===
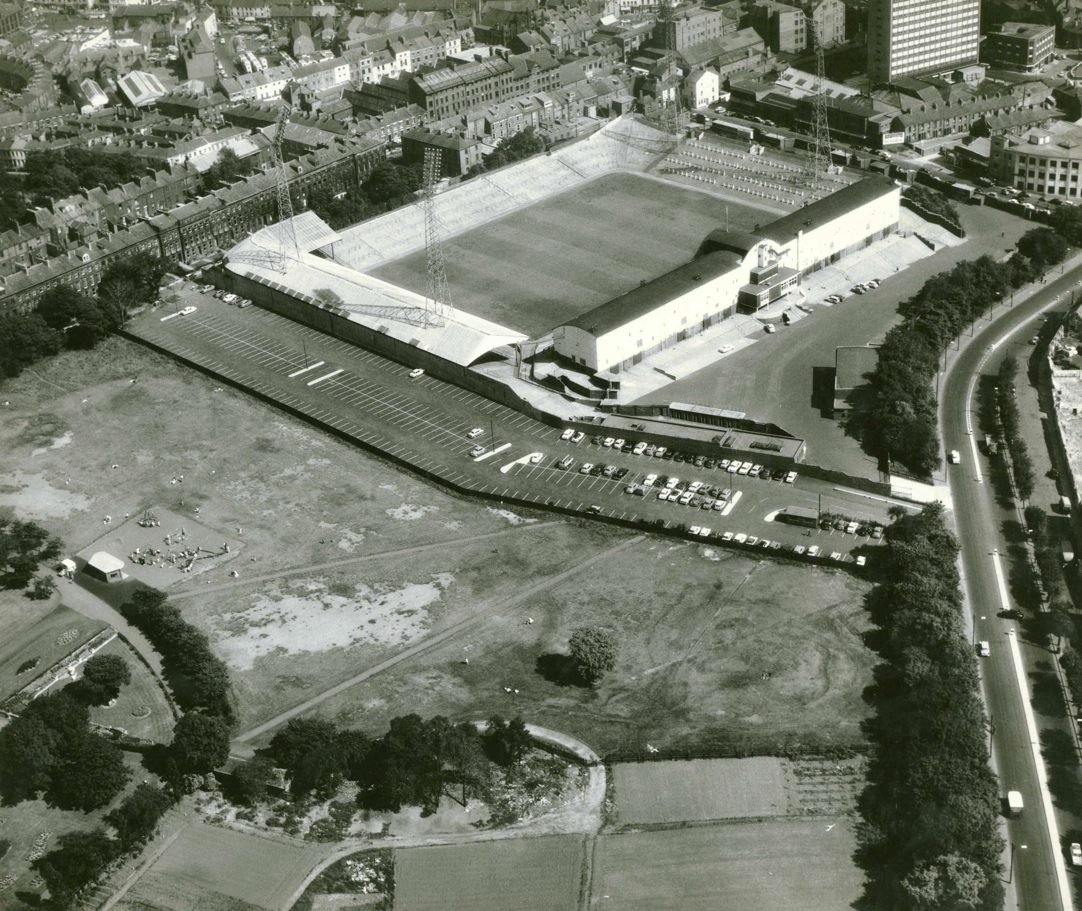
An aerial view of the stadium in 1963

Between 1920 and 1930, plans were drawn up for a double-tiered stand by notable football architect Archibald Leitch. However, after planning disputes, all that was achieved was a small roof over the Leazes Terrace side (Sir John Hall Stand). Floodlights were constructed in the 1950s, with the first match played using them held on 25 February 1953 against Celtic.

Up until the 1960s, planning difficulties continued, culminating in lack of development of the ground being cited as the reason for failure of Newcastle United to secure the right to host a group stage of the upcoming 1966 World Cup following political disputes.

In the late 1960s further attempts were made to develop the site, and the council proposed a multi-use sports development of St. James' Park. This was rejected as not financially viable. Plans were drawn up by the club for a move to a stadium in Gosforth, or even a groundshare with Sunderland in a new stadium on Wearside. These plans were withdrawn in 1971 after agreement to redevelop St. James' Park was finally reached, after mediation by the then-Minister for Sport, Denis Howell. In 1972, work started on the East Stand, 50 years after it was last permitted to be developed. In 1978, the Leazes End was demolished, but relegation and financial difficulties meant the new stand was not built.

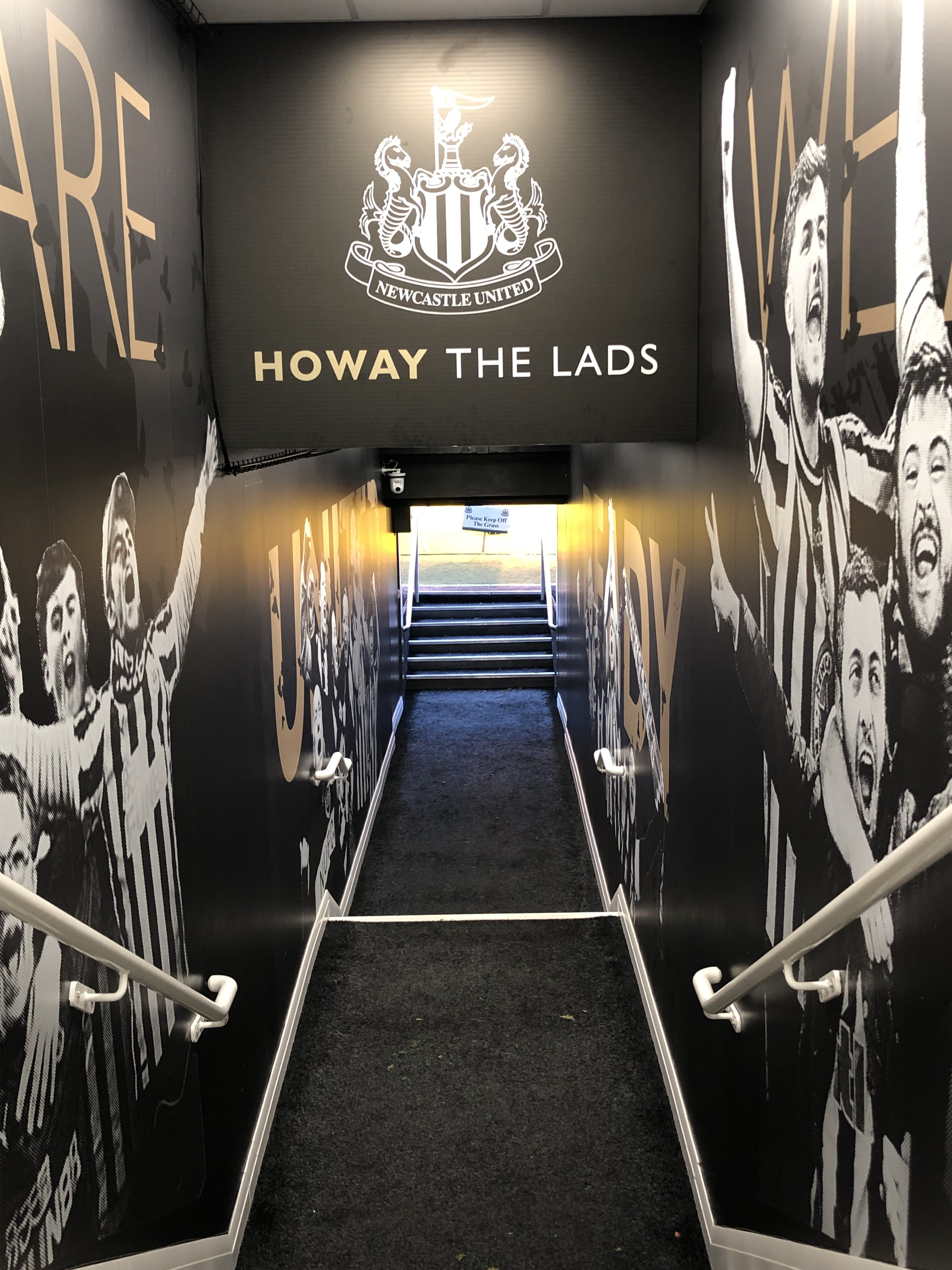
Entrance to the pitch from beneath the Milburn Stand.

Investigations following the Bradford City stadium fire in 1985 identified a need to replace the ageing West Stand, which was demolished in 1986. Its replacement, the Milburn Stand, was named in honour of Jackie Milburn and opened in 1987. Further development was again shelved for lack of finance.

=== Sir John Hall era ===
Until the early 1990s, the ground had achieved only modest expansion under various owners, with plans dogged by disputes and lack of finance due to poor on-field performances. In January 1992, businessman Sir John Hall, who had led the Magpie Group consortium in a hostile takeover of the club, was installed as chairman. Sir John used his experience in property development to rapidly gain approval and invested heavily in the stadium with finances gained from success under new manager Kevin Keegan.

==== 1993 expansion ====
The Leazes End that had been demolished but not replaced was finally rebuilt, and opened as the Sir John Hall stand for Newcastle's debut season in the Premiership in 1993. The Gallowgate End was rebuilt, the Milburn Stand modified, and a new pitch, drainage and floodlights were installed. With all four corners filled in with seating, by 1995, the stadium had reached a capacity of 36,610.

==== Proposed Leazes Park development ====
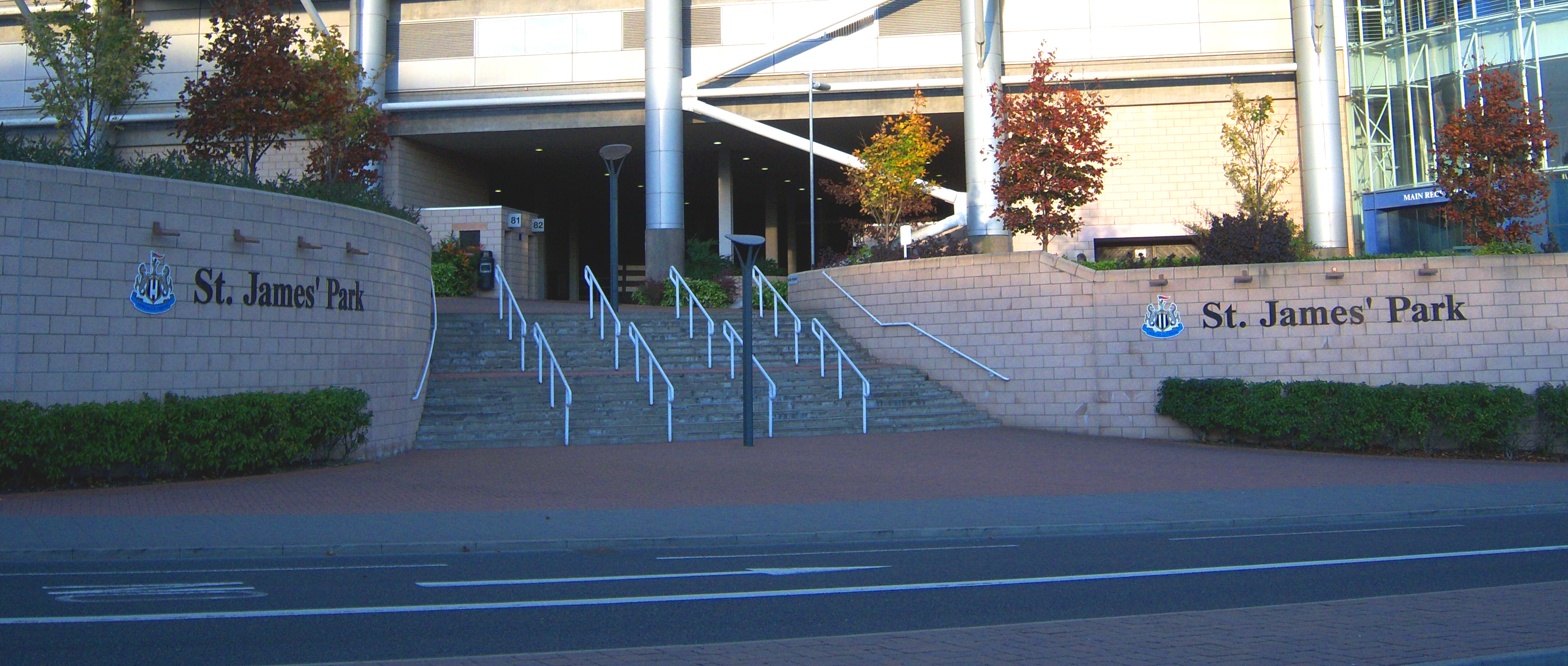
The St. James' Park steps, outside the main stand on Barrack Road where many sports journalists deliver press reports about the club. The stadium main entrance is to the right of the steps (the blue structure).

As the expanded stadium still received full houses due to continuing success of the team led by the returning Kevin Keegan, in 1995, plans were submitted by the club to relocate to Leazes Park to the north. A new £65m purpose-built 55,000-seat stadium would be erected, less than two pitch lengths away from the original, but rotated, which would be similar to the San Siro in Italy. The old ground would be redeveloped to be used by Newcastle Falcons Rugby Club, as part of the wider envisaged 'Sporting Club of Newcastle', with basketball and ice-hockey teams purchased by Sir John Hall.

Leazes Park was historically part of the Town Moor, owned by the Freemen of Newcastle, and protected by the Newcastle-upon-Tyne Town Moor Act 1988. The City council initially invited the planning proposal amid suggestions that the club might move to a site in Gateshead, a 75,000-seat stadium next to Gateshead International Stadium, but it led to political debate and opposition. A pressure group "No Business on the Moor" eventually gathered a 36,000-petition signature, equal to the then-current stadium capacity. Opposition also came from a conservation group Friends of Leazes Park led by Dolly Potter. The club proposed to mitigate the loss of the moor land with proposals for a land trade-off with landscaping of land freed up by scaling down of the existing stadium restoring the views of the historic park from Leazes Terrace.

It became clear that the relocation plan would not gain planning permission without a potentially long-running public enquiry. To quickly satisfy demand, the club decided to expand the current St. James' Park instead.

=== Freddy Shepherd era ===
In 1997, Sir John Hall stepped down as chairman (remaining as a director until 2007, now life president of the club), and existing shareholder and board director Freddy Shepherd became chairman.

==== 1998 expansion ====
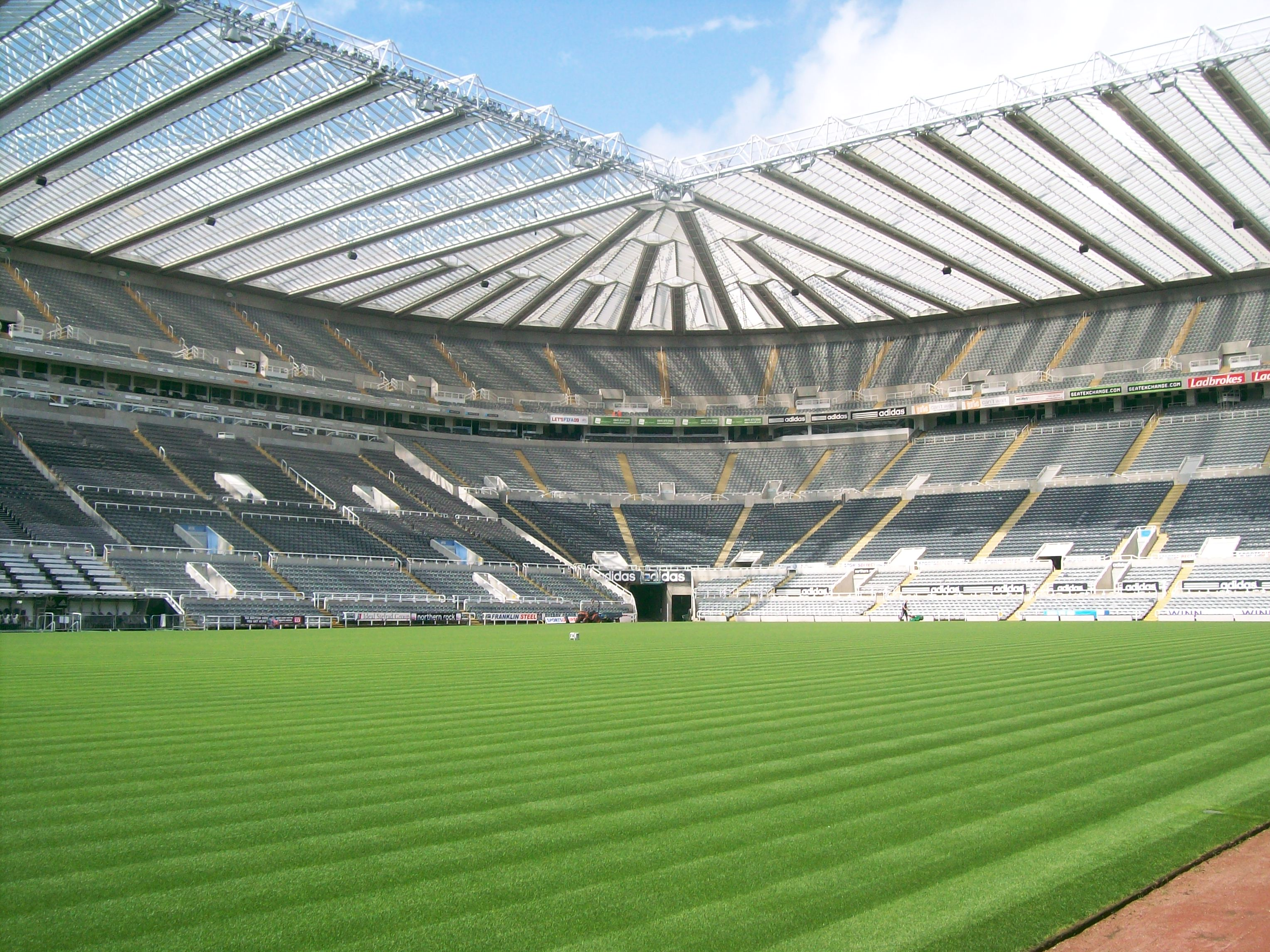
Post 1998 expansion

Following the withdrawal of the Leazes Park plan, the club proposed expansion of St. James' Park to over 52,000 capacity, through major construction of a second tier over the Milburn Stand, Leazes End and adjoining corner, adding to a structure that was itself just four years old. After a refusal by the Secretary of State to take the application to an inquiry, permission was obtained in July 1998. For minimal disruption to seating capacity during construction, the project required three-day shutdowns of work on home match days. 750 seats were lost during construction. During this expansion, executive boxes in the East Stand were demolished and replaced by seating blocks from pitch level up to the existing rows, in a mirror image of the Milburn Stand. The executive boxes were transferred to the new Milburn/Leazes complex, with more added to the Gallowgate End. During development, the additional stand and roof was constructed while leaving the existing cantilever roof intact until the last possible moment These developments increased capacity to approximately 52,143. The construction was completed in July 2000 at a cost of £42 million. Ironically, after opposition from local residents to the relocation plan, the expansion of the current ground at the Leazes End has further reduced the view of Leazes Park from Leazes Terrace, although this is now student accommodation.

==== Save Our Seats campaign ====
The 1998 redevelopment caused controversy when the club informed 4,000 season-ticket-holding fans that their seat prices would be increased to corporate rates, with the option of paying these or being moved to seats in the proposed expanded sections. Half of these fans were 'bondholders', who had paid £500 in 1994 which they asserted guaranteed them an option on their specific seat for ten years. Some fans resisted, and after two high-court cases and a Save Our Seats campaign, the club was allowed to move the fans, under an exceptional circumstances clause. As a gesture of goodwill, the club did not pursue the fans for legal costs awarded over their insured limit.

==== Casino plans ====
In late 2003, preempting the relaxation of the UK gambling laws, the club signed a deal with MGM Mirage to hand over the land above St James Metro station, behind the Gallowgate End, in return for an equity investment, to build a jointly run complex centred on a 1,000-square-foot (93 m^{2}) Super Casino. These plans failed when the proposed number of super casinos was reduced to one in the UK, and in January 2008 £5 million was repaid by the club to MGM.

==== Gallowgate additions ====
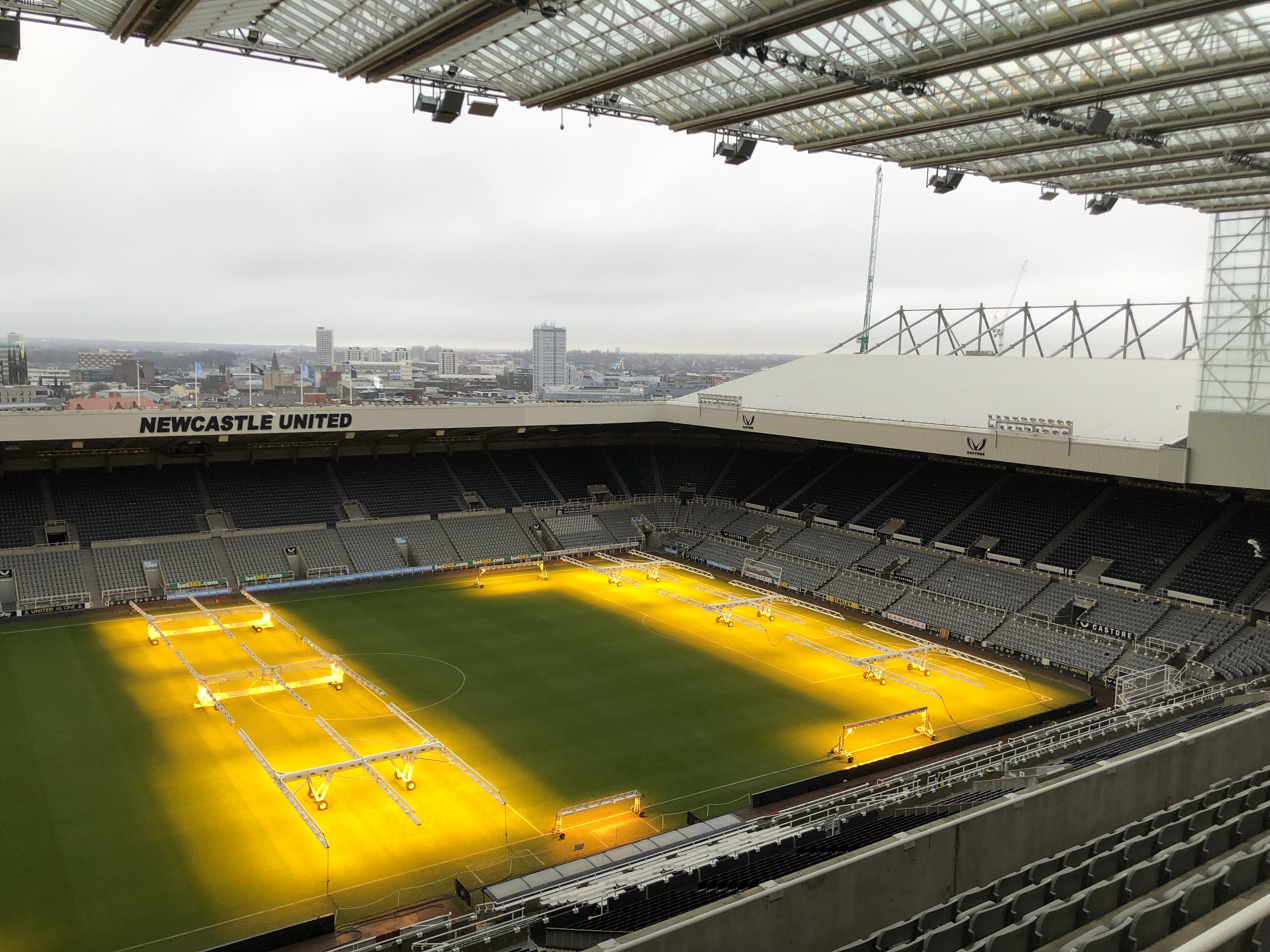
Image of the East and Gallowgate Stands at St James' Park

In 2005, the Gallowgate was redeveloped, with a new bar being built beneath the upper tier of the Gallowgate End, named "Shearer's'" after Newcastle player Alan Shearer. During excavation underneath the stand during building work, the builders uncovered the original steps of the old Gallowgate End stand, which had simply been covered up when the stadium was fully renovated in 1993. These steps were removed for Shearer's Bar. The completion of the redevelopment of the Gallowgate saw the creation of Shearer's Bar, an expanded club shop, a club museum and a new box office.

==== 2007 proposed expansion ====
It was announced on 2 April 2007 that the club intend to submit plans for a new £300million development of the stadium and surrounding areas, to include a major conference centre, hotels and luxury apartments. The proposals also include a plan to increase the Gallowgate End, eventually taking the capacity to 60,000.

This expansion would be funded by the city council and linked to the redevelopment of the land behind the stand and over the Metro Station, which had previously been earmarked for the casino project. Expansion of the Gallowgate end involves difficulties due to the proximity of a road, Strawberry Place, and issues surrounding reinforcement of the underground St James Metro station.

=== Mike Ashley era ===
The 2007 redevelopment plans announced under the previous regime were put on hold following the takeover of the club and its plc holding company by owner Mike Ashley. One of the first noticeable changes in the stadium in the new era was the removal of advertising mounted underneath the roofs (facing the crowd) for Shepherd Offshore and Cameron Hall Developments, companies associated with the previous regime. A large advertising sign for Sports Direct appeared on the lip of the roof of the Gallowgate, visible from the pitch.

A full review of the club performed by the new management team concluded that stadium expansion was not a priority. For the start of the 2008–09 season, the away section was moved from the corner of the Leazes stand/Milburn stand to the other end of the Leazes stand, where it abuts the East stand, at the same upper level. The area of seats designated as the family enclosure were expanded, and certain corporate areas saw increased pricing.

The first home game of the 2008–09 season, at 3 pm on a Saturday, saw the lowest-ever Premier League attendance at the expanded ground, of 47,711, resulting in cash turnstiles. It was speculated at the time that this was due to the Great Recession; however, with the shock departure of Kevin Keegan before the next home game, future changes in attendances would be hard to attribute to this alone. The first game after Keegan's resignation, a league fixture against Hull on 13 September 2008, registered a crowd of 50,242 amid protests against Ashley and Dennis Wise. This was followed by an attendance of 44,935 on 27 September in a league fixture against Blackburn Rovers, which followed a record low attendance of 20,577 on Wednesday, 24 September in a League Cup fixture, the lowest ever attendance for a competitive first-team match since the 1993 promotion to the top flight, and a drop of over 4,000 from previous lows.

Although Newcastle's crowds inevitably fell in 2009–10 as a result of their relegation, and the fact that Britain was still in recession, the Magpies still attracted a modern-day record average attendance for a club at this level with their attendance for the season averaging at 43,383. They also became the first championship club to attract a league attendance of more than 50,000 at this level in the modern era, and ended the season promoted as champions of the Football League Championship.

In October 2014, a scoreboard was installed in the far corner of the Sir John Hall Stand. The scoreboard was used for the first time on 18 October during a Premier League tie against Leicester City. However, the game was delayed by one hour, due to damage caused by strong wind to the paneling surrounding the scoreboard. Newcastle United later stated on their website: "Supporter safety was of paramount importance."

==== Renaming of the stadium ====
On 10 November 2011, Newcastle United announced that the stadium would officially be renamed Sports Direct Arena, as a temporary measure to "showcase the sponsorship opportunity to interested parties", whilst looking for a sponsor for possible future stadium re-branding. According to the club, the St. James' Park title was dropped as not being "commercially attractive".

Previously, in 2009, the club had announced plans to sell the naming rights for the stadium. After protests about the possible loss of the name of the stadium, which included the tabling of an early day motion in Parliament, the club clarified the following week that the move would not involve the loss of the name St. James' Park altogether, citing the example of 'SportsDirect.com@StJamesPark' as a potential stadium rights package. The following day, the club announced that the stadium would be known as sportsdirect.com @ St James' Park Stadium temporarily until the end of the season, to showcase the idea behind the package, until the new sponsor was announced. The stadium's official renaming as the Sports Direct Arena, or SDA, caused considerable perturbation amongst supporters of the team.

On 9 October 2012, payday loan company Wonga.com became Newcastle United's main commercial sponsor and purchased the stadium naming rights. They subsequently announced that the St. James' Park name would be restored as part of the deal.

=== Saudi-led era ===
Following the takeover of Newcastle United, the new ownership would remove the Sports Direct sponsorship all over the stadium with co owner Amanda Staveley claiming she was "looking forward" to removing the Sports Direct branding to get new sponsors with the signs being removed on 6 December. With the removal of the sponsor in the stadium, former owner Mike Ashley would take legal action against Staveley and her husband Mehrdad Ghodoussi, after Ashley alleged that both Staveley and Ghodoussi breached their agreement to continue to sponsor the stadium until the end of the 2021–22 season.

Prior to the beginning of the 2024–25 season, the "Newcastle United" signage, located above the East Stand, was restored to the original font that was used prior to the Sports Direct sponsorship.

== Stadium description ==
=== Name ===
==== Official names ====
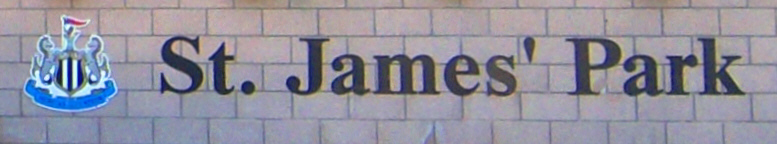
The sign outside St. James' Park main entrance

St. James' Park is spelt with James' featuring one s and an apostrophe mark, as seen on the signage of the St. James' Park steps outside the entrance to the stadium, and signage inside the adjacent Metro station. The use of an apostrophe is in contrast with the name of the Metro station itself, which is signed as St James Metro station, and with the street signs of the nearby St James Street and St James Terrace. Further, the use of one s and an apostrophe mark differs from the common convention of adding a second s to monosyllabic possessives ending in s, as is the case with the well-known public space in London: St James's Park.

The full stop after the St giving St. James' Park had been both included and omitted by many sources. The club's official website includes the full stop, but this has not always been the case.

Post-millennium it has been debated both whether the written name should include an apostrophe mark after St. James, and, if it does, whether the official written form should include an extra 's' after the apostrophe. Pronunciation of the name with a second 's' sound or not differs between both the local public and journalists, and is similarly debated.

In May 2008, BBC Look North examined the case for adding an extra 's', to denote the ground is "the park of St James". The club stated that the ground is named after its neighbouring street, St James Street, which predates the ground, although it was pointed out the road sign of that street, and that of the adjacent St James Terrace, did not feature apostrophes. The BBC stated that both local newspapers The Evening Chronicle and The Journal write the name with a second 's', reinstating it partially in response to reader complaints after a period of publishing stories without it.

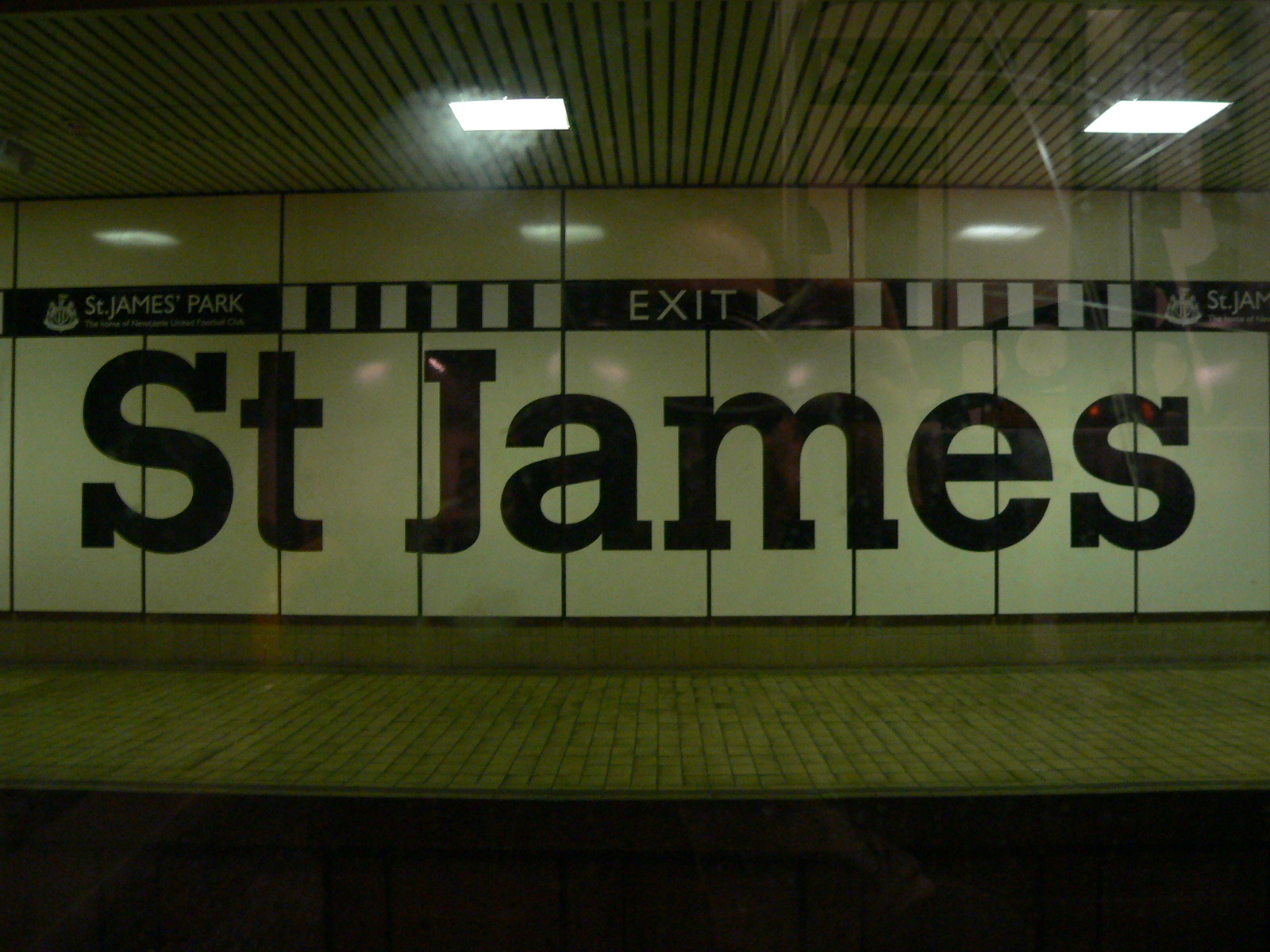
The name of the Metro station as displayed in St James Metro station

The club insisted the name is pronounced without a second 's', whilst it was asserted by the BBC that older fans, in particular, pronounce it with two.

A professor of applied linguistics of Newcastle University stated that if a second 's' was added to the name, it has to ultimately be pronounced in speech. The BBC went on to state that according to the Apostrophe Protection Society, if the ground is named as the "Park of St James", the name of the ground is correctly written as St. James's Park, with the second 's' pronounced.

Commenting on the written form on Radio Newcastle a week after the BBC story, a different senior lecturer in applied linguistics also of Newcastle University stated that if the name is to denote "the park of St James", the written form should feature an apostrophe, but the use of an additional 's' after it is optional and both are correct.

Match-day programmes printed up until the late 1940s have written the name as St. James's Park. According to the club historian, the oldest memorabilia in the club museum refers to the ground as being pronounced without a second 's'. However, a match-day programme dating from 1896, reprinted in the match-day programme of a home match against Derby County (23 December 2007) depicts the stadium name as St. James's Park.

Other sources also support the idea that the name should have no apostrophe as found in the name of the adjacent St James Street

==== Nicknames ====
The stadium is known by its initials, SJP, or as St. James'. In reflection of the early use of the site, it is also often referred to as Gallowgate, distinct from similarly unofficially named Gallowgate End, the name of the south stand.

=== Location ===
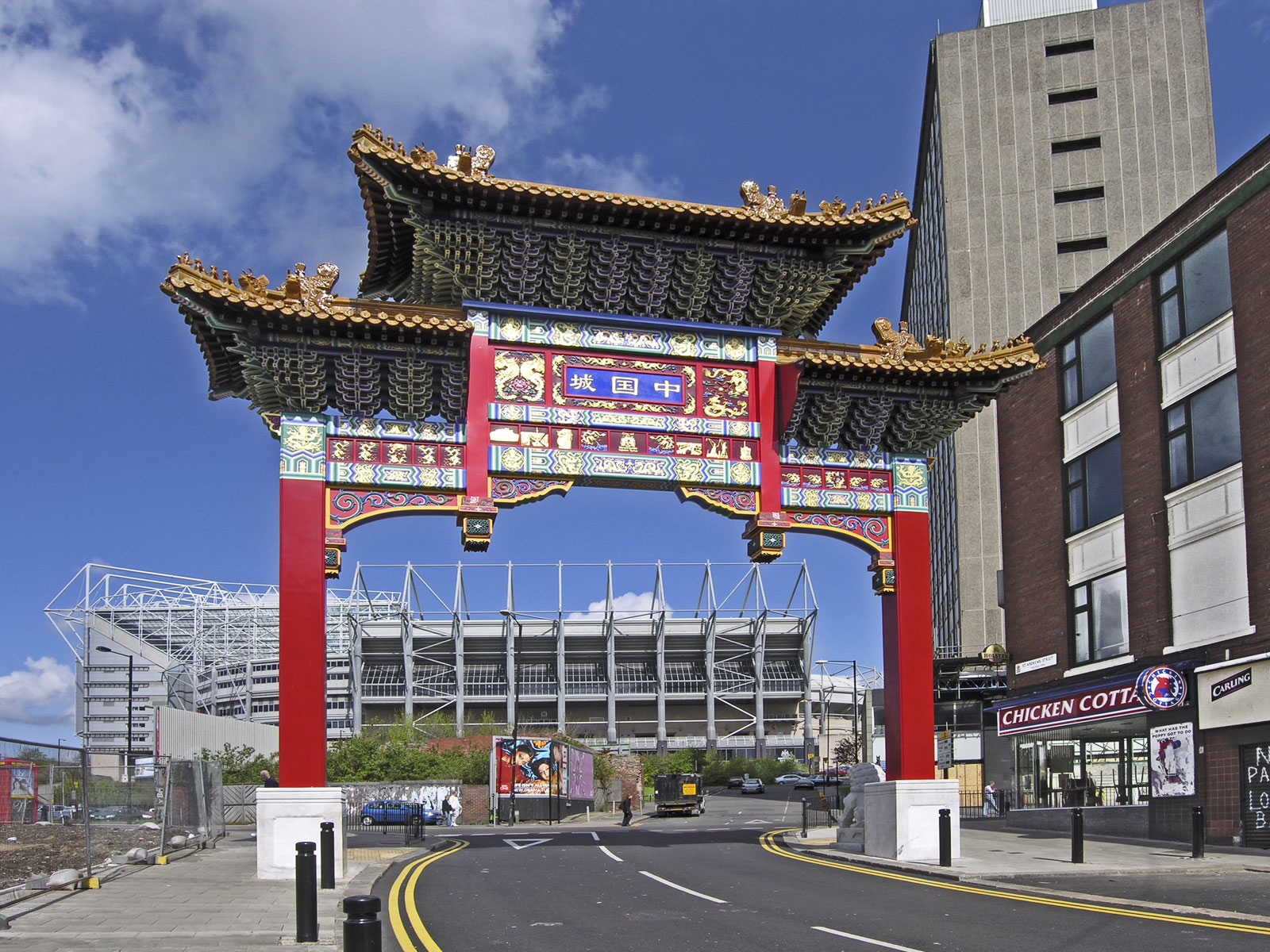
View of the Gallowgate End through the Chinatown Arch

The stadium's location is close to the city centre, 500 m roughly north of Central station, the main railway station of the city. The stadium is bordered by Strawberry Place behind the Gallowgate, Barrack Road in front of the main entrance, a car park to the north and Leazes Terrace to the East. Further south is St James station, a terminus station of the Tyne & Wear Metro line to the east, although the main Metro interchange at Monument station, is situated only 250 m to the east.

=== Architecture ===
The Milburn stand is the 'main' stand of the stadium, housing the main entrance, lifts and escalators behind a glass fronted atrium. The dugouts and player's tunnel is located in the traditional position of the middle of the main stand. Behind the seating terraces of the stands, the Milburn/Leazes structure contains four concourse levels, the Gallowgate End has three concourse levels, and the East stand has two concourse levels.

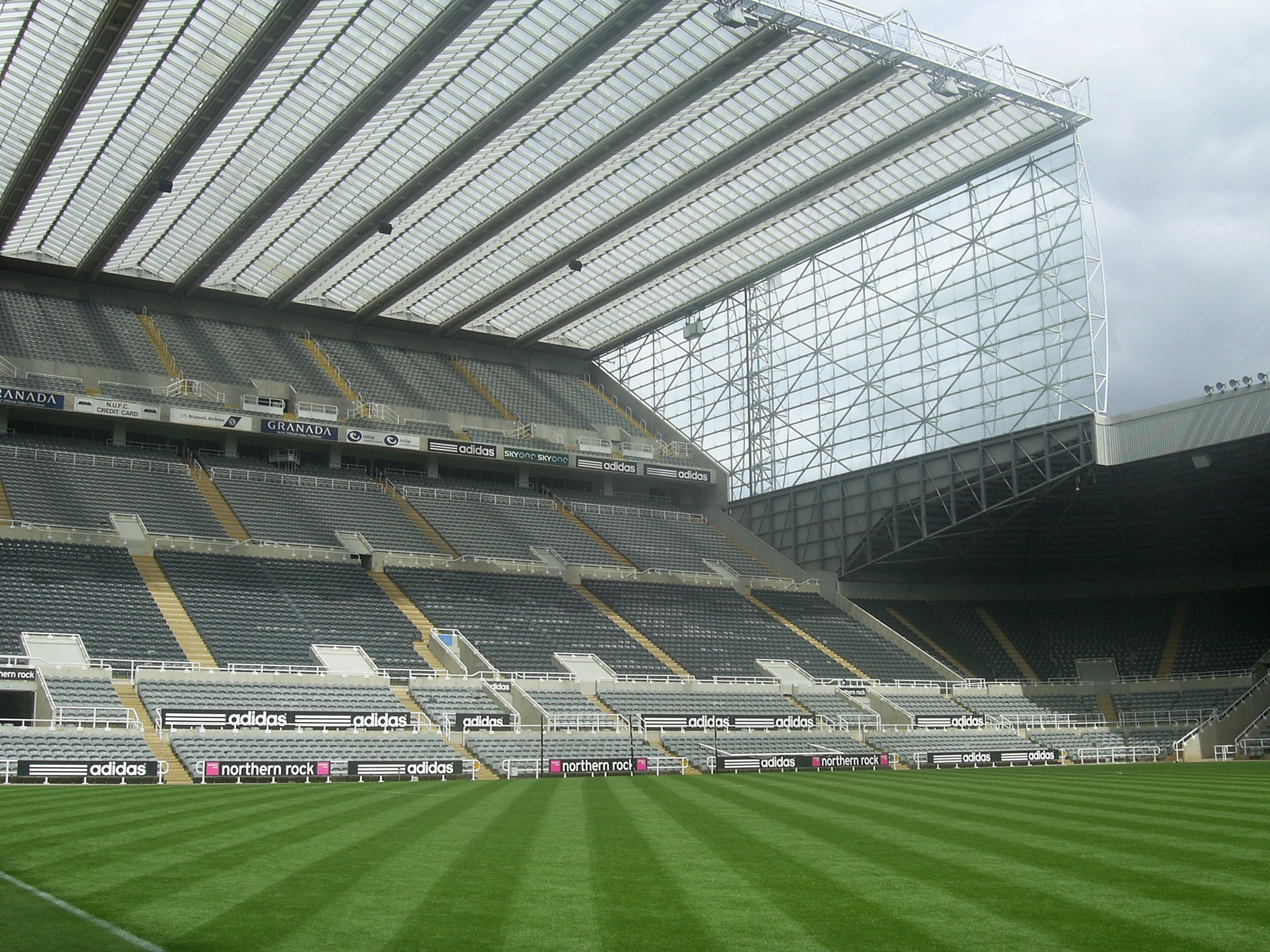
Leazes End and north east Corner, showing height difference in new and old stands

The stadium has an asymmetrical appearance from the air and from some angles from ground level, due to the discrepancy in height between the sides and ends of the ground. The height difference between the Leazes/Milburn complex and the East/Gallowgate stands allows views of the city centre from many seating positions inside the ground. Further expansion of the Gallowgate End could potentially produce a more balanced horseshoe arrangement of equal height stands, similar to that of Celtic Park.

The Milburn stand and Leazes end are double tiered, separated by a level of executive boxes; The East Stand and Gallowgate End are single tiered, with boxes also at the top of the Gallowgate. The three newest sides, the Milburn Stand, Leazes End and Gallowgate End are of structural steel frame and pre-cast concrete construction. In common with many new or expanded British football stadiums, the traditional box shaped 'stands' were augmented in the 1993 expansion by filling in the corners to maximise available seating, up to a uniform height. The Milburn Stand and Leazes End now rise higher than this level, covered by a one piece cantilevered glass roof. A further smaller stand section rises above this level behind the Gallowgate End.

The steel truss cantilever roof above the Milburn/Leazes complex that was built in 1998 is the largest cantilever structure in Europe at 64.5 metres (212 ft), eclipsing the 58 metres (190 ft) cantilevers of Manchester United's Old Trafford.

=== Orientation ===
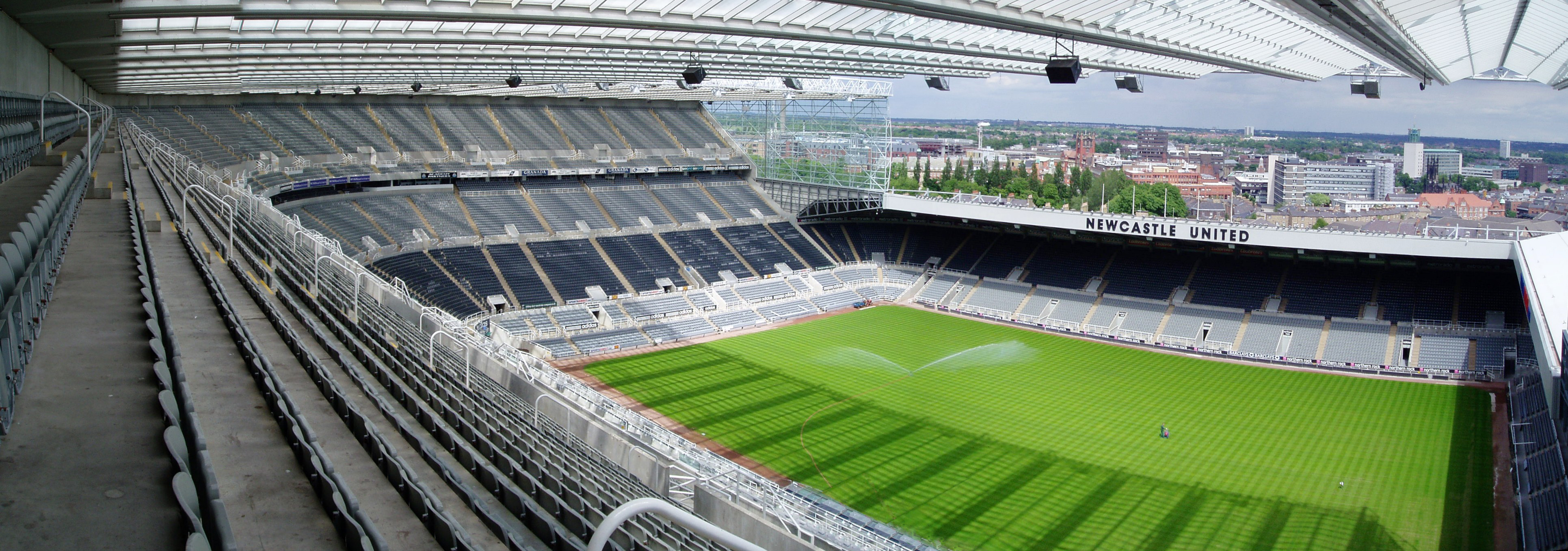
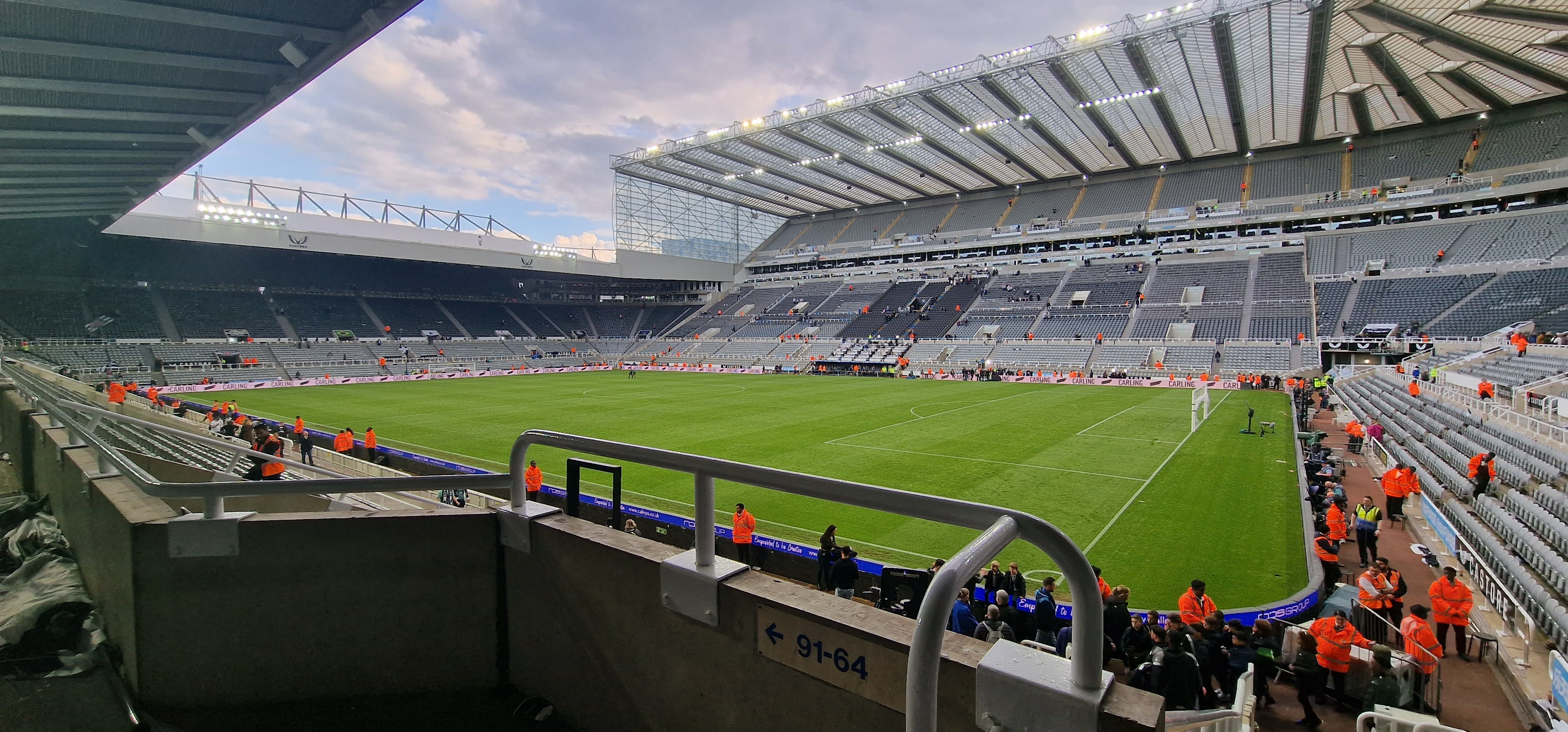
Panorama of St James' Park

The stadium has a rough pitch alignment of north easterly. The four main stands are as follows:

- Gallowgate End (previously known as the Newcastle Brown Ale Stand and before that the Exhibition Stand), at the southern end of the ground, named unofficially for its proximity to the old City gallows, and officially after the long association with the club of sponsor Scottish and Newcastle Breweries;
- Leazes End (previously the Sir John Hall Stand), at the northern end of the ground, named for its proximity to Leazes Park, and after the club's Life President Sir John Hall; The Singing Section was positioned in Level 7 of this stand.
- Milburn Stand, the main stand, on the west side of the ground. Named after 1950s footballer Jackie Milburn
- East Stand, whose name is self-explanatory, and the smallest stand of the four. Following the death of Sir Bobby Robson, a plan to rename the East Stand the Sir Bobby Robson Stand (or the Robson Stand) was drawn up. As yet, this has not been made official.

The unofficial new home of the singing section is located in the "Strawberry Corner" (South East Corner, located next to the Strawberry Pub) - between the Gallowgate End & East Stand.

=== Capacity ===
The stadium has a maximum seating capacity of 52,750, making it:

- the ninth-largest club football stadium in England, behind Wembley, Old Trafford, the London Stadium, the Tottenham Hotspur Stadium, Anfield, the Emirates Stadium, the Etihad Stadium and the Everton Stadium;
- the eleventh-largest football stadium in the United Kingdom overall when including the Millennium Stadium (the national stadium of Wales), and Celtic Park (a Scottish club football ground);
- the thirteenth largest stadium in the United Kingdom overall when including the rugby venues of Twickenham in England, Murrayfield in Scotland.

Developments since 1993 have ensured the lower tier of seating of the ground still forms a continuous bowl around the pitch, below the level of the executive boxes. The club record attendance is 68,386 set in 1930 against Chelsea, when standing was allowed on the terraces.

=== Seating layout ===
The current stadium design offers an unobstructed view of the pitch from all areas of the ground. The Milburn stand is the location of the directors box and press boxes, and the main TV camera point for televised games.

Away fans for league matches were originally accommodated in the upper level, in the north west corner, which can hold a maximum of 3,000 fans. However, plans were made at the end of the 2007–2008 season to relocate the away supporters to the far end of the upper level of the Leazes End. This location has attracted criticism due to the poor view offered by being so far from the pitch due to the height of the stand, and the 14 flights of stairs to reach the upper level. For FA Cup matches the lower section of the corner is also used.

The traditional home of the more vocal fans is considered the Gallowgate End, in the same vein as The Kop for Liverpool F.C. The Gallowgate End was the end that the team attacked in the second half if they win the coin toss. In recent years there has been unofficial fan movement to create a singing section in the Leazes End upper tier, partly to counter the away fans, and partly to recreate some atmosphere lost since the recent expansion over 36,000. This group of fans call themselves the 'Toon Ultras'. Level 7 of the Milburn Stand houses the official Family Enclosure. Due to the expansion of the Family Enclosure, many fans from the singing section have relocated to the Strawberry Corner.

In 2013, a group began to help 'Bring Back The Noise' as St.James Park, this being branded as 'Division '92'. This group first began at home to Metalist Kharkiv in the Europa League. From that date the group began to move from strength to strength with new aims set to develop a singing section within the ground for all league games.

=== Facilities ===
As well as the normal Premiership football stadium facilities, the stadium contains conference and banqueting facilities. These comprise a total of six suites with a total capacity of 2,050, including the 1,000 capacity Bamburgh Suite containing a stage, dance floor and three bars, and the New Magpie Room, on two levels with a pitch view.

The stadium houses premium priced seating areas designated into clubs, each with their own access to a bar and lounge behind the stand for use before the match and at half-time. The Platinum Club, Bar 1892, Sovereign Club and the Black & White Club are in the Milburn Stand, and the Sports Bar is in the Leazes End

The Gallowgate End houses Shearer's, a sports bar and lounge, which is effectively another city centre nightspot in Newcastle, accessible only from the exterior of the ground. The bar is named after Alan Shearer. The Gallowgate also houses a large club shop and a police station. The Milburn stand houses the main box-office. In the south west corner, there is also a cafe and a club museum.

==== Statues and memorials ====
image	subject	location	date	artist
	Jackie Milburn (1924–1988)	South-east corner of St. James' Park	1991	Susanna Robinson
	Bobby Robson (1933–2009)	South-west corner of St. James' Park	2012	Tom Maley
	Joe Harvey (1918–1989)	Gallowgate Wall	2014	John McNamee Jnr
	Alan Shearer (1970–)	South-west corner of St. James' Park	2016	Tom Maley

== Usage ==
=== Club football ===
Newcastle United have played their home league matches continuously at St. James' Park. The stadium had not featured a scoreboard or big screen of any kind since the 1993 expansion displaced one from The Gallowgate end; although, in 2007, bright red digital time displays were installed near the corner flags at pitch level. A big screen for the stadium was mooted as a possibility as part of a proposed new stadium branding exercise for 2010. On 18 October 2014, a large scoreboard was erected onto the side of the Leazes End, adjacent to the Milburn Stand. The first day of its use in a game versus Leicester City saw a one-hour delay to kick-off over safety concerns around the screen due to high winds.

=== International football ===
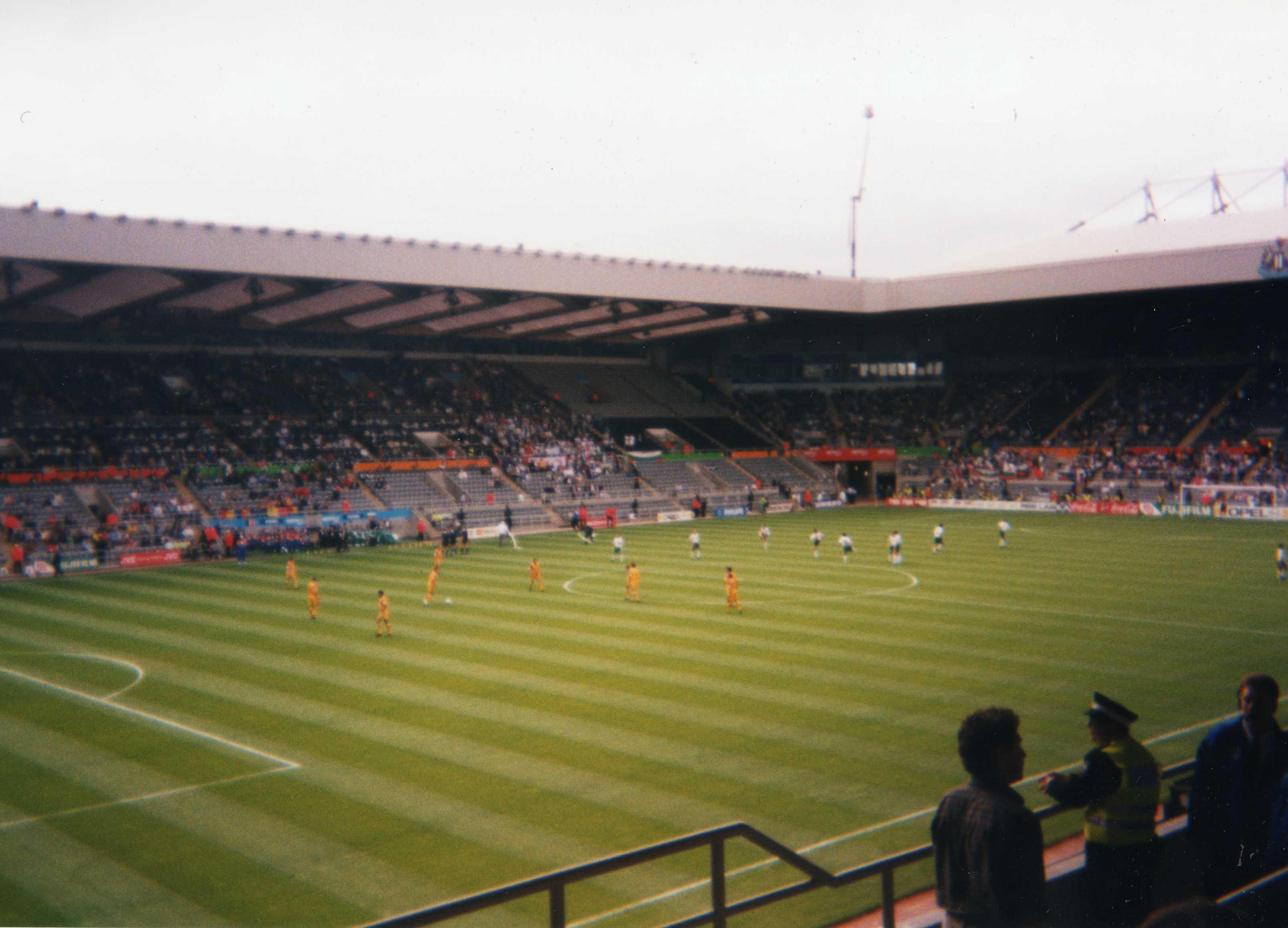
Euro 96 game Bulgaria v Romania

The stadium hosted three matches during Euro 1996. Along with Elland Road, it was assigned to Group B, which comprised France, Spain, Romania and Bulgaria.

The stadium was one of several venues used as temporary home grounds for the England team while the redevelopment of Wembley took place.

St. James' Park also hosted some football matches in the 2012 Summer Olympics.

The stadium hosted two international friendlies in September 2023 between Saudi Arabia and Costa Rica on the 8th, and Saudi Arabia and South Korea on the 12th.

The stadium will host matches in UEFA Euro 2028.

==== Matches ====
Date		Result		Competition
18 March 1901	England	6–0	Wales	British Home Championship
6 April 1907	England	1–1	Scotland	British Home Championship
15 November 1933	England	1–2	Wales	British Home Championship
9 November 1938	England	4–0	Norway	Friendly
10 June 1996	Romania	0–1	France	Euro 1996
13 June 1996	Bulgaria	1–0	Romania	Euro 1996
18 June 1996	France	3–1	Bulgaria	Euro 1996
5 September 2001	England	2–0	Albania	World Cup 2002 Qualifying
18 August 2004	England	3–0	Ukraine	Friendly
30 March 2005	England	2–0	Azerbaijan	World Cup 2006 Qualifying
26 July 2012	Mexico	0–0	South Korea	2012 Olympics
26 July 2012	Gabon	1–1	Switzerland	2012 Olympics
29 July 2012	Japan	1–0	Morocco	2012 Olympics
29 July 2012	Spain	0–1	Honduras	2012 Olympics
1 August 2012	Brazil	3–0	New Zealand	2012 Olympics
4 August 2012	Brazil	3–2	Honduras	2012 Olympics
8 September 2023	Saudi Arabia	1–3	Costa Rica	Friendly
12 September 2023	Saudi Arabia	0–1	South Korea	Friendly
3 June 2024	England	3–0	Bosnia and Herzegovina	Friendly
12 June 2028	E3	–	E4	Euro 2028
15 June 2028	C2	–	C4	Euro 2028
17 June 2028	F2	–	F4	Euro 2028
20 June 2028	D2	–	D3	Euro 2028
25 June 2028	Winner Group B	–	3rd Group A/D/E/F	Euro 2028

=== Pitch ===
For football use, the pitch has the maximum international dimensions of 105 by 68 metres.

=== Rugby league ===
On 30 and 31 May 2015, the stadium held the Super League Magic Weekend. St. James' Park was chosen to host the event after the City of Manchester Stadium, which had hosted the event annually since 2012, became unavailable.

The event was considered a success, with the 2015 event setting both single-day and aggregate attendance records for the event. The Magic Weekend returned to St. James' Park in 2016, breaking the aggregate crowd record in the process, and returned once again for 2017 and 2018.

Magic Weekend returned to Newcastle in April 2021, for the 2021 Season, after previously been held at Anfield for the 2019 Season and being cancelled for the 2020 season. Magic continued to be played at Newcastle in 2022 and 2023, before being moved to Elland Road, home of Leeds United, for the 2024 season, where it was renamed to "MAGIC WKND". It was again used for MAGIC WKND 2025 on the 3&4 of May.

There have been three rugby league internationals played at St. James' Park. The stadium is hosted the opening ceremony and opening game of the 2021 Rugby League World Cup – Men’s tournament, the first rugby league international to be played at the stadium for 110 years.

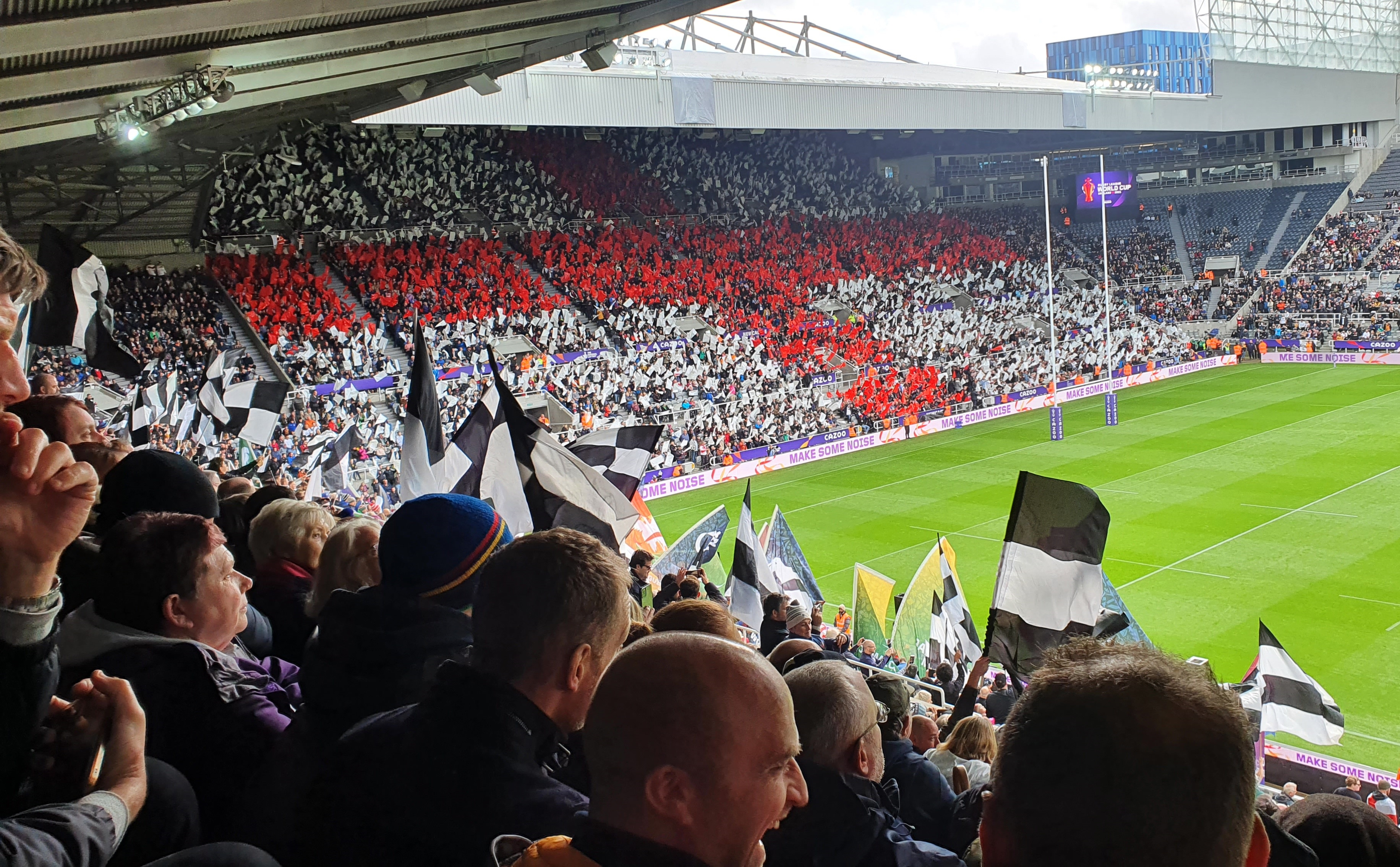
England rugby league fans create an England flag ahead of the launch of the 2021 Rugby League World Cup at St James' Park

Test	Date		Result		Attendance	Notes
1	23 January 1909	(United Kingdom) Northern Union	15–5	Australia	22,000	1908–09 Ashes series
2	8 November 1911	Australia	19–10	Great Britain	5,317	1911–12 Ashes series
3	15 October 2022	England	60–6	Samoa	43,199	2021 Men's Rugby League World Cup

=== Rugby union ===
==== England national team ====
On Friday 6 September 2019, England defeated Italy in a warm-up match for the 2019 Rugby World Cup. This was England's first Test match in Newcastle and first away from Twickenham (outside the World Cup) since 2009.

==== 2015 Rugby World Cup ====
The stadium hosted three 2015 Rugby World Cup matches. The first was a Pool B match between South Africa and Scotland on 3 October 2015, with South Africa winning 34 - 16 with 50,900 in attendance. The second was a Pool C match between New Zealand and Tonga on 9 October 2015, with New Zealand winning 47 - 9 with 50,985 in attendance. The third and final was a Pool B match Samoa and Scotland the next day with Scotland winning a close one 36 - 33 with 51,982 in attendance.

Date	Competition	Home team		Away team		Attendance
3 October 2015	2015 Rugby World Cup Pool B	South Africa	34	Scotland	16	50,900
9 October 2015	2015 Rugby World Cup Pool C	New Zealand	47	Tonga	9	50,985
10 October 2015	2015 Rugby World Cup Pool B	Samoa	33	Scotland	36	51,982

==== European professional club rugby ====
In April 2017, the stadium was announced as the host for the 2019 finals of the European Rugby Challenge Cup and Champions Cup.

==== Newcastle Falcons ====
On 21 November 2017, it was announced that Newcastle Falcons would take their Premiership Rugby match against Northampton Saints on 24 March 2018 to St. James' Park. The match dubbed The Big One was the first Premiership game at the venue.

The Falcons would return the following year to host Sale Sharks on 23 March 2019.

=== Charity matches ===
As well as professional matches, the stadium has been the venue for several charity football matches, including testimonial matches for Alan Shearer and Peter Beardsley. The stadium was also the venue of the final of The Prince's Trust Challenge Trophy, on 14 October 2007, between the Duke of Northumberland and Earl of Durham teams.

On 26 July 2009, St. James' Park hosted the Sir Bobby Robson Trophy match, in aid of the Sir Bobby Robson Foundation, in which the famous Italia '90 World Cup semi-final loss against West Germany, in which Robson's England team were beaten 4–3 on penalties after a 1–1 draw, would be replayed featuring players from the original World Cup squads and other special guests.

=== Video games ===
The stadium has regularly featured on different popular football games such as FIFA and EA FC; it also appears to be included on the global front cover of FIFA 13 with Lionel Messi in the foreground. The title sequence of FIFA Football 2004 featuring Ronaldinho, Thierry Henry and Alessandro del Piero was shot at the stadium.

=== Concerts ===
The stadium has hosted concerts for many famous artists, including The Rolling Stones, Bruce Springsteen & E Street Band, Queen, Status Quo, Bob Dylan, Bryan Adams, Rod Stewart, Kings of Leon and Ed Sheeran. In 2023 the stadium hosted two sold out nights for Sam Fender, and then three more sold out nights in June 2025 during his People Watching Tour.

=== Film and television ===
The stadium has also been used as an audition venue for the television show The X Factor and also reality television show Big Brother. St. James' Park has also hosted the final celebrity matches of the Sky television reality TV show The Match. The stadium was used extensively as a filming location for the film Goal!, as the film follows a fictional player Santiago Muñez who signs for Newcastle. There is also film footage showing a game between Newcastle and Liverpool from 1901.

=== Sir Bobby Robson tributes ===
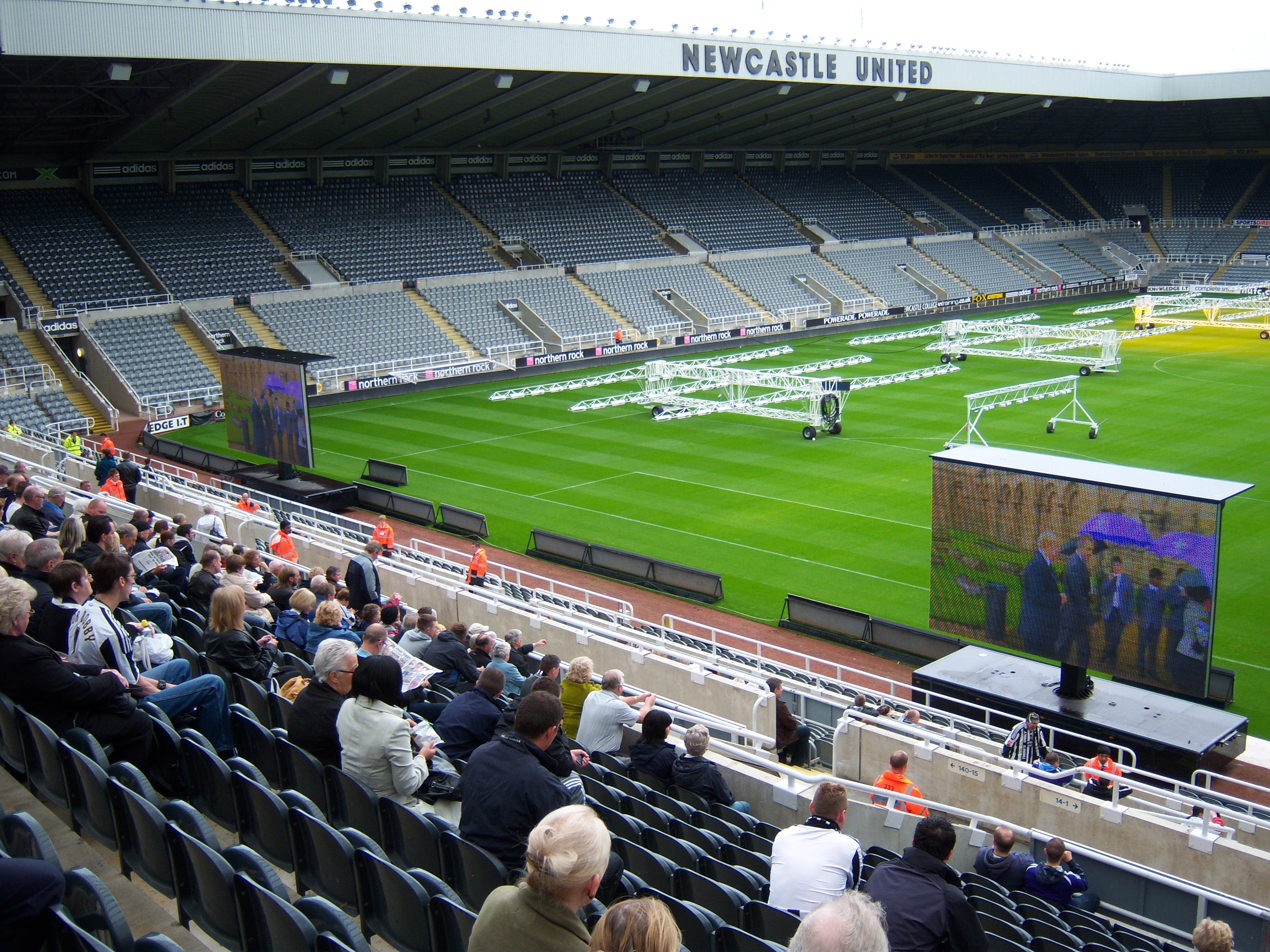
Sir Bobby's thanksgiving service shown at St. James' Park

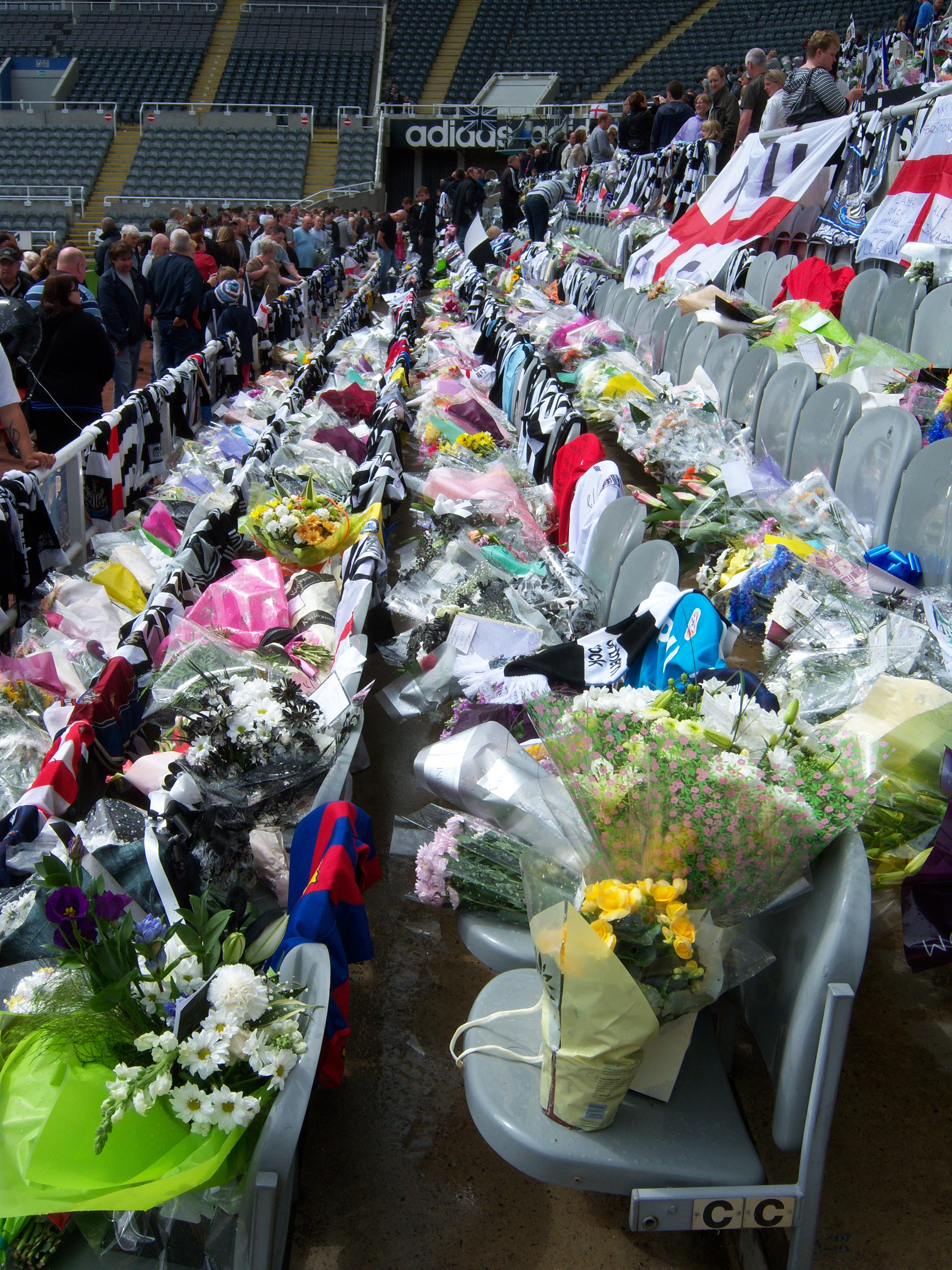
Floral tributes laid for Sir Bobby at St. James' Park

Sir Bobby Robson, a lifetime Newcastle fan who managed the club from 1999 to 2004, died of cancer aged 76 on 31 July 2009, five days after having been at St. James' Park to watch the England v Germany charity trophy match played in his honour and in aid of his cancer foundation. Immediately after his death, St. James' Park became an impromptu shrine to Sir Bobby, with thousands of fans leaving floral tributes, club shirts and scarves in the Leazes End for the following ten days. After a private funeral service on 5 August, a thanksgiving service held on 21 September at Durham Cathedral in Sir Bobby's memory was broadcast on two big screens for spectators in the Leazes End.
