= Gina Long =

Philanthropist, entrepreneur, journalist, radio presenter and global charity campaigner

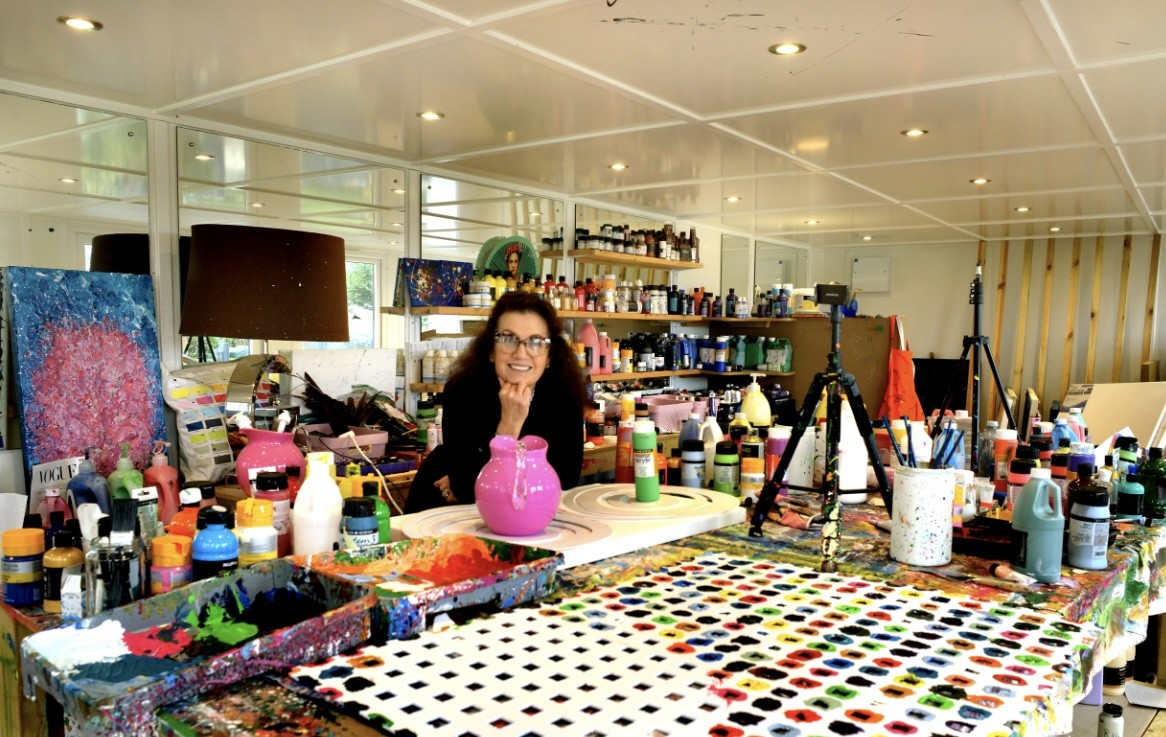
Gina Long MBE

Gina Long MBE (born 4 April 1962 in Ipswich, Suffolk, England) is an entrepreneur, voluntary charity fundraiser, campaigner and communicator who has raised over £9 million across 45 years for regional and national charities. This includes founding her own charity, GeeWizz (2015–22). She was awarded an MBE for services to the charity sector in December 2015. She was made an Honorary Fellow of the University of Suffolk in October 2018. In recent years, Gina has become an established British contemporary artist, citing a donation from Ed Sheeran as the spark that ignited her artistic journey.

== Career ==
Long began her media and communications career in regional press before moving to the United States, where she secured licensing agreements with the NFL, NBA, MLB + 70 colleges, launching a global sports novelty products business.

Returning to the UK in 1994, she founded Marketing Force, a roundabout sponsorship which became nationally advertised. Long went on to serve as Head of Communications at Hutchison Whampoa, and later BT Exact, and also founded Celebrity Messages, a mobile content business.

== Charity work ==
Long was appointed MBE for services to the charity sector in December 2015. Long has raised over £9 million for charity and started a charitable foundation in December 2015 to support East Anglian families living with cancer or a disability. The GeeWizz Charitable Trust was set up to create a platform to purchase equipment for children in Suffolk and Norfolk helping children and young adults with disabilities and those who are affected by cancer, either directly or indirectly, or those carrying out research into the disease, especially sarcoma and breast cancer. The GeeWizz slogan was #transparentgiving, based on the principles of transparent and accountable fundraising to ensure every donor and fundraiser knows exactly where their money is spent and how it changes many lives of those supported. In February 2023, it was announced that GeeWizz would be closing to focus on "family, other charity campaigning and projects [they are] passionate about."

In April 2010, Long launched the very first Sir Bobby's Online Auction, a global fundraiser held in memory of her friend and former England manager Sir Bobby Robson. The two-week online auction, held annually until 2015, featured luxury 'money-can't-buy' items from the world of sport, celebrity and lifestyle raising hundreds of thousands of pounds for the Sir Bobby Robson Foundation, Breakthrough Breast Cancer and other charities. The likes of Wayne Rooney, Sir Alex Ferguson, and Jose Mourinho have all supported the global fundraiser in the past.

She was a founder member of the Suffolk Breakthrough Breast Cancer group and in August 2015, Long and close friends celebrated raising £1 million for the charity. Long took the lead in implementing an East Anglian-based special events fundraising committee of the Prince's Trust, chairing it for two of her 10 years and helping to raise more than £480,000, and later became chair of the special events committee of East Anglia's Children's Hospice, covering Suffolk, Norfolk, Cambridgeshire, and North Essex.

In 2020, Long created and organised the Ed Sheeran Made in Suffolk Legacy Auction. A total of £506,000 was raised to fund two legacy projects - the redevelopment of a playground at the Thomas Wolsey Ormiston Academy in Ipswich and the introduction of a specialist nursing team - including learning disability and palliative care nurses and physiotherapists - at the Zest service, run by St Elizabeth Hospice. The auction saw Gina and her small team work closely with John and Imogen Sheeran, parents to Ed Sheeran, who donated several prizes, along with many other global superstars, artists and organisations.

Gina's has mentored a number of local charities and individuals including becoming an Ambassador for St Edmundsbury Cathedral and a Patron for Suffolk Libraries.

A farmer's wife and advocate for the countryside, agriculture and the environment, Gina was asked to become a vice-president of The Country Trust, the UK's leading national educational charity connecting children from areas of high social and economic disadvantage.

In November 2023, Gina was awarded the Roger Wilson CBE Inspiration of the Year at Sarcoma UK's inaugural Shining Star awards at a ceremony at 10 Downing Street.

== Contemporary art ==
In 2023, Gina began painting, exploring art as a form of personal expression. Her debut public exhibition, Square Peg Round Hole, will open on Tuesday 6 October - and will be the largest ever to be held at St Edmundsbury Cathedral.

Exploring human connection, identity and belonging, each painting forms part of a pair, with 16 conceptual diptychs featuring interlocking squares and circles that symbolise the tension between conforming and staying true to oneself.
