= National Punctuation Day =

U.S. observance dedicated to punctuation; September 24

National Punctuation Day is a celebration of punctuation that occurs each year on September 24 in the United States of America. Founded by Jeff Rubin in 2004, National Punctuation Day simply promotes the correct usage of punctuation. Rubin encourages appreciators of correct punctuation and spelling to send in pictures of errors spotted in everyday life.

== Attention generated ==
National Punctuation Day has been recognized nationally in the US media and in celebrations by people of all ages. A few of these notable events are listed below:

- FontFeed credits National Punctuation Day with the revival of the interrobang.
- StudioSTL of St. Louis, MO, promotes National Punctuation Day by holding an annual happy-hour fundraiser. The event raises money for their free writing programs and raises awareness for the value of correct punctuation.
- Auburn Elementary School of Auburn, MI, celebrates National Punctuation Day annually.
- CBS's Live with Regis & Kelly mentioned National Punctuation Day on their morning television show on September 24, 2008.
- Scribblenauts Unmasked (2013), a puzzle game about writing, was released this day in Europe (PC version only) and North America.

== See also ==
- International Apostrophe Day
