= Sir Bobby Robson Trophy match =

Charity football match

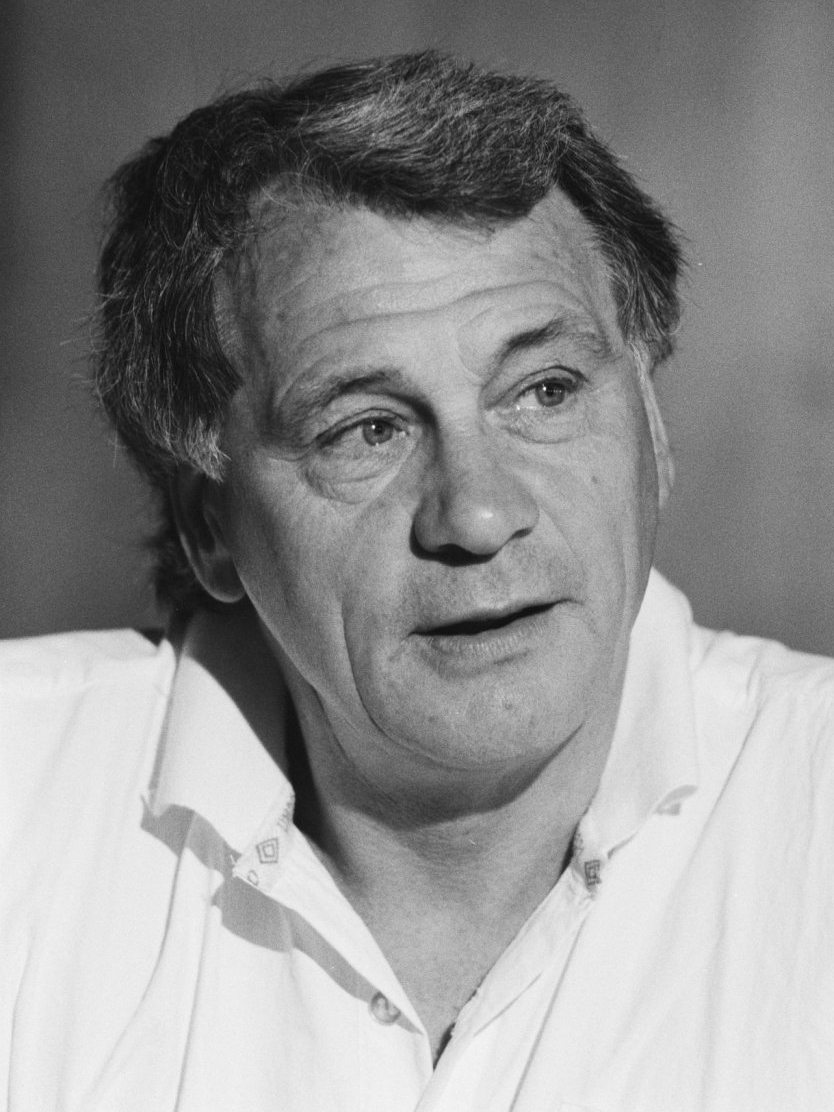
Bobby Robson, June 1988

The Sir Bobby Robson Trophy match was a charity football match played in honour of the former England and Newcastle United manager, Sir Bobby Robson, and in aid of his cancer charity, the Sir Bobby Robson Foundation. Produced under licence by Toast Entertainment Group, it was played at St James' Park in Newcastle upon Tyne, England, on Sunday 26 July 2009. The match was described as the 'tear-jerker of the decade', and proved to be Robson's last public appearance, as he died five days later on the morning of 31 July 2009 aged 76, having been suffering from cancer, his fifth diagnosis in his lifetime. Early estimates were that the charity match raised hundreds of thousands of pounds for the Foundation which he set up in the last years of his life to fund cancer research in his native North East England.

The match was pitched as a replay of an England 1990 FIFA World Cup match played under Robson's reign as manager and was to feature English and German players from the original 1990 World Cup squads. England won the game 3–2 in normal time, watched by 33,000 spectators in the stadium, as well as being broadcast live by ITV4.

The England team featured 6 of the original 1990 starting eleven, in addition to appearances from other 1990 English and German squad members, and other retired England and Newcastle United footballers, and selected celebrity guests. England recovered from being 2–0 down after goals from Thomas Helmer and Fredi Bobic with goals from Les Ferdinand and Alan Thompson, to end the first half 2–2. England won the game after a second half penalty from Alan Shearer with 11 minutes to go.

== Background ==
=== Italia 90 ===
The 1990 World Cup hosted in Italy, was the culmination of eight years of management of England by Robson, and it had been announced by the FA prior to the tournament that it would be his last in charge of England. England reached the semi-finals, and played West Germany at the Stadio delle Alpi in Turin. After finishing 1–1 in normal time, and with no goals in extra time, England lost the game 4–3 in a penalty shoot-out, with Stuart Pearce and then Chris Waddle missing England's final penalties. During the game, Paul "Gazza" Gascoigne openly wept when he received a yellow card during extra time, which meant he would have missed the final had England won.

At the time of the match, the World Cup performance of 1990 under Robson was the furthest England had progressed in the tournament on foreign soil; it was equalled at the 2018 World Cup. The West Germans later went on to win the final in a game against Argentina. The knock-out on penalties was Robson's second unlucky departure from the late stage of a World Cup, after England were knocked out of the 1986 World Cup in Mexico, after the so-called 'Hand of God' goal by Diego Maradona in the Argentina v England quarter-final.

In addition to the 1990 game, the charity game revived a footballing rivalry between England and Germany which began with the 1966 FIFA World Cup Final which England won, and the following World Cup in 1970 where Germany knocked England out at the quarter final stage. The Bobby Robson Trophy game also followed a 5–1 defeat for England in the England v Germany Legends match watched by 10,000 at Bramall Lane on 7 August 2008. The Bobby Robson game featured four players from that England Legends team (Walker, Lee, Barnes and Hodge), while the German team featured nine from their Legends side (Buchwald, Helmer, Schulz, Marschall, Bobic, Gaudino, Borowka, Freund and Pflügler).

=== Newcastle ===
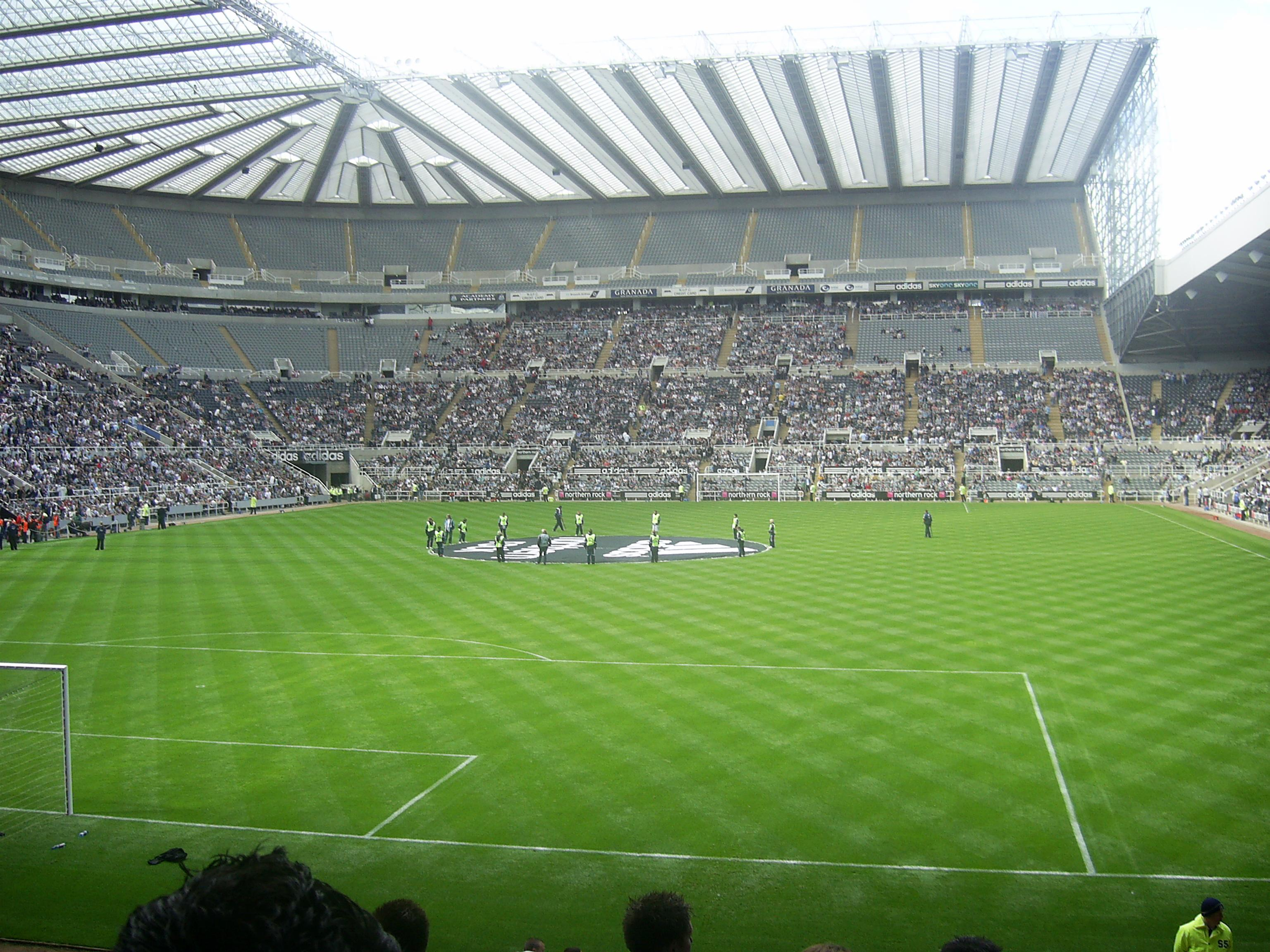
St James' Park

As well as an Italia '90 World Cup theme, the charity game was to have a strong connection with Newcastle United football club, with the game being played at their home stadium St James' Park, and featured several former Newcastle players, John Barnes, Peter Beardsley, Dave Beasant, John Beresford, Paul Bracewell, Les Ferdinand, Paul Gascoigne, Steve Howey, Robert Lee, Alan Shearer and Alan Thompson, and with Robson having been manager of Newcastle. At the time of the charity game, both Beardsley and Thompson also held official roles at Newcastle United, with Thompson being reserve team coach and Beardsley being a coach for the youth academy. Beardsley, Gascoigne and Waddle, having all made their names at Newcastle in the 1980s, were in the England team for Italia '90.

Robson managed Newcastle United between 1999 and 2004. His arrival lifted the Newcastle team immediately after the experiences of the Ruud Gullit era, and produced an 8–0 victory over Sheffield Wednesday in his first home game in charge in September 1999. The team under Robson later peaked in 2003, coming close to reaching the last eight of the UEFA Champions League and finishing third in the domestic FA Premier League. Under Robson, Newcastle also reached the semi-final of the UEFA Cup in 2004.

Attendees of the match would also include a delegation from the German city of Gelsenkirchen, headed by the city's Lord Mayor, Oberburgermeister Frank Baranowski, who were visiting to celebrate the 60th anniversary of their twin city relationship with Newcastle upon Tyne, and to support the Newcastle bid to be a host city for either the 2018 or 2022 FIFA World Cup with Group stage games played at St James' Park. Gelsenkirchen was a host city for the 2006 World Cup. The England team shirts wore the logo of the NewcastleGateshead host city bid.

Much of the media coverage of the charity match focused on the present situation at Newcastle United, picking up on Alan Shearer's reply of "I know as much as you do," to a pre-match question as to whether he would be installed as Newcastle manager for the forthcoming season beginning in 13 days, with the club being up for sale and with the first team without a manager, being in the care of coach Chris Hughton. Neither the Newcastle United owner Mike Ashley or managing director Derek Llambias were in attendance at the charity match.

=== Sir Bobby Robson Foundation ===
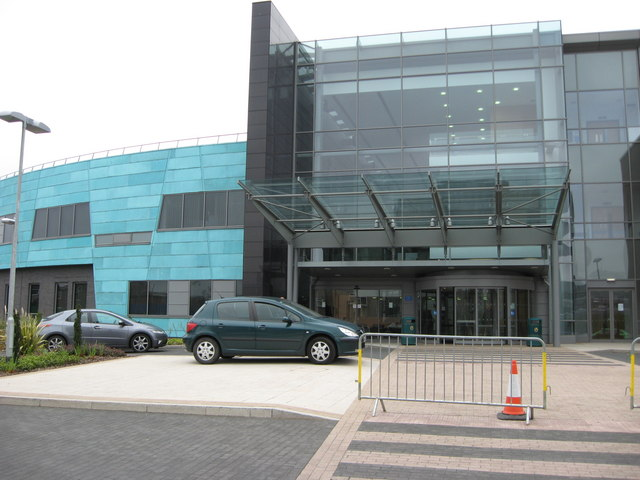
The Northern Centre for Cancer Care at the Freeman Hospital in Newcastle upon Tyne

Having left England after Italia '90, Robson was first diagnosed with cancer in 1992 while manager of Dutch side PSV Eindhoven. He remained in football until 2007, stepping down after his fifth diagnosis of cancer, later determined to be terminal. In 2008, he put his name and support to the Sir Bobby Robson Foundation, a charity set up to raise funds for cancer research. By the time of the charity match, the Foundation had raised £1.3m. Of the tickets sold in advance for the game, a block booking of over 100 seats was made by staff of the Sir Bobby Cancer Trials Research Centre, the research centre within the grounds of the Freeman Hospital that was equipped with money raised from the Sir Bobby Robson Foundation.

== Preparation ==
=== Announcement and build up ===
The match was first announced on 24 April 2009. The Foundation reported that 14,000 tickets for the match had been sold by 14 July. The Foundation denied reports that ticket sales had been affected by turmoil at Newcastle United following their relegation in May, or their scheduling of a pre-season friendly in Utrecht, the Netherlands on the day before the match, later cancelled. The friendly was later re-arranged to be played at 3pm in London against Leyton Orient F.C. on the Saturday before the charity game on Sunday. 25,000 tickets had been sold for the charity match by Tuesday 21 July, and the announcement on 21 July that local legend Alan Shearer was to play was expected to increase sales to a sell-out 52,000 crowd. The eventual attendance of 33,000 was over double that of the crowd for the following Newcastle United game, when 17,000 watched the only pre-season friendly at St James' Park against Leeds United on 29 July.

The night before the charity match, a fund-raising dinner in Robson's honour was held at Blagdon Hall, hosted by ITV sports presenter Jim Rosenthal, also due to play in the game. Rosenthal had interviewed Robson for television straight after the defeat in Italia '90.

Prior to the match, Robson received tributes from both Tony Blair and Gordon Brown. The matchday programme featured articles from Robson, Fabio Capello, Terry Butcher, Lothar Matthäus, Alan Shearer, Paul Gascoigne, Peter Beardsley, Chris Waddle, Stuart Pearce, Mark Wright, Gary Lineker and Peter Shilton.

=== Squads ===
The charity game featured the following players.

England (1990 squad)

- John Barnes
- Peter Beardsley
- Dave Beasant
- John Beresford
- Paul Bracewell
- Les Ferdinand
- Paul Gascoigne
- Simon Grayson
- Steve Hodge
- Steve Howey
- Robert Lee
- Gary Pallister
- David Platt
- Alan Shearer
- Peter Shilton
- Trevor Steven
- Alan Thompson
- Des Walker
- Mark Wright

West Germany (1990 squad)

- Jörg Albertz
- Stefan Beinlich
- Fredi Bobic
- Uli Borowka
- Guido Buchwald
- Steffen Freund
- Maurizio Gaudino
- Michael Hartmann
- Thomas Helmer
- Lothar Matthäus
- Olaf Marschall
- Jens Nowotny
- Hans Pflügler
- Oliver Reck
- Michael Schulz

Celebrities

- Craig David
- Angus Deayton
- Paddy McGuinness
- Jimmy Nail
- Jim Rosenthal
- Simon Webbe

In the matchday programme the celebrity guests were listed as part of the German squad, although on the day they turned out for the England team. Hartman, Helmer and Schultz played for the Germans but were not listed in the matchday programme squad as was Paule Beinlich. Teddy Sheringham was listed for England in the matchday programme, but did not feature in the squad.

The captain of the 1990 German team Lothar Matthäus led the German team in the charity replay. The England team featured Steve Hodge, who was the only outfield England player not to have played in the original tournament, due to a late injury. Stuart Pearce, another member of the Italia '90 England team and former Newcastle United player, was unable to play in the game due to commitments as the present day England under-21 team manager. The Italia '90 England captain Terry Butcher could not play due to a double knee replacement, but was instead a commentator for the match.

=== Kits, coaches, officials and broadcast ===
Winning design for the team logo

In the original Italia '90 game, England wore their white home kit, while West Germany wore a green patterned away shirt. For the charity replay, England wore a bespoke all white kit, while Germany wore an all black kit. A special badge was worn by both teams. It was chosen by Robson from designs submitted by local schoolchildren, with the winning design incorporating a half and half design of the Flag of Germany and the Flag of England, superimposed with the logo of the Sir Bobby Robson Foundation.

Howard Wilkinson was manager of the England team. Lothar Matthäus took the role of player manager for the Germans. Wilkinson picked 10 of his starting 11, while the final place was selected by an ITV phone vote before the game, with Rob Lee being chosen over John Beresford and Steve Howey. In the dugout for England were also John Carver and Don Howe. Carver was Robson's assistant during his time at Newcastle. Howe was Robson's assistant in his early time at England.

The match was officiated by referee Dermot Gallagher, assisted by Martin Dexter, Chris Banks and Chris Lee. The game was to go to penalties if the result was a draw after 90 minutes.

The match was broadcast live on ITV4 from 5.30pm, presented by Steve Rider, with match commentary by Clive Tyldesley and Terry Butcher. The Sir Bobby Robson Trophy was produced by Toast Entertainment Group under license for ITV Sport. The buildup to the match was to be filmed for a documentary on Robson's life and career.

=== Pre-match ceremony ===
Robson attended the game in a wheelchair in defiance of his ailing health. After the formation of the team line-up and guard of honour on the pitch, Tenors Unlimited, a three-man opera group, sang both national anthems. Robson was then wheeled into the ground. In an unplanned gesture he proceeded to shake hands with the assembled players and greet the honour guard. He was then presented with a Lifetime Achievement Award, the Emerald UEFA Order of Merit award (inscribed as the Ordre du Merite). After the award presentation Tenors Unlimited then performed a rendition of "Nessun Dorma", which was the theme music for the BBC 1990 World Cup coverage. Robson then left the pitch to a standing ovation from the crowd, who were singing "Walking in a Robson Wonderland", a terrace song dating from Robson's Newcastle management era. He was taken to his usual position in the Newcastle Director's Box to watch the match.

== Match details ==
=== Summary ===
26 July 2009
18:15 (BST)

England Select XI	3–2	West Germany Select XI
Ferdinand 28'; Thompson 32'; Shearer 79' (pen.)	report	Helmer 5'; Bobic 18'

St James' Park
Attendance: 33,000
Referee: Dermot Gallagher

England XI	Germany XI

1	Shilton (c)	(substituted off) 13'
4	Walker	(substituted off) 71'
7	Lee	(substituted off) 81'
3	Wright	(substituted off) 45'
5	Steven	(substituted off) 18'
6	Platt	(substituted off) 24' (substituted on) 81'
19	Gascoigne	(substituted off) 38'
11	Barnes	(substituted off) 24'
8	Beardsley	(substituted off) 69'
9	Shearer
10	Ferdinand	(substituted off) 59'
Substitutes:
2	Hodge	(substituted on) 38' (substituted off) 86'
12	Beasant	(substituted on) 13'
14	Beresford	(substituted on) 24'
15	Howey	(substituted on) 45'
16	Pallister	(substituted on) 71'
17	Bracewell	(substituted on) 59' (substituted off) 89'
18	Grayson	(substituted on) 18'
20	Thompson	(substituted on) 24'
21	David	(substituted on) 69' (substituted off) 84'
22	Webbe	(substituted on) 84'
23	McGuinness	(substituted on) 86'
24	Deayton	(substituted on) 89'
25	Rosenthal
26	Nail
Manager:
Howard Wilkinson

1	Reck
15	Hartmann	(substituted off) 63' (substituted on) 73'
4	Buchwald
7	Nowotny
3	Pflügler	(substituted off) 45'
6	Freund	(substituted off) 45' (substituted on) 63'
10	Matthäus (c)	(substituted off) 13' (substituted on) 45' (substituted off) 59'
5	Helmer	(substituted off) 45' (substituted on) 59' (substituted off) 73'
8	Beinlich	(substituted off) 75' (substituted on) 81'
12	Gaudino	(substituted off) 61' (substituted on) 75'
9	Bobic	(substituted off) 45' (substituted on) 61'
Substitutes:
2	Schulz	(substituted on) 45'
11	Albertz	(substituted on) 13'
14	Borowka	(substituted on) 45' (substituted off) 81'
16	Marschall	(substituted on) 45'
Manager:
Lothar Matthäus

=== First half ===
England started the game with a 3–4–1–2 formation, with Beardsley lying off of the two front men of Shearer and Ferdinand, while Germany started with a 4–3–2–1 formation with Bobic as the lone striker. The Germans kicked off the match, with England attacking the Leazes End of St James Park. The first goal of the game was relatively easy for the Germans, and came from a run by Helmer through the middle of the England defence, who after a one-two with Bobic, scored through the advancing Shilton's legs. In reply, immediately after the restart Shearer was given wrongly offside running onto a long pass from Beardsley in the England half. The first corner of the game was safely gathered by the German keeper on 7 minutes. On 12 minutes Shilton was forced to gather a long range shot from Matthaus, which was to be Shilton's last action in the game, having pulled a muscle in a kicked clearance after 2 minutes. Germany's second goal came on 18 minutes from a Bobic shot in the 6 yard box, latching onto a pass from Albertz on the touchline having taken advantage of space left by Trevor Steven in the right back position having picked up an injury, being substituted following the goal.

England replied to the early German goals with a long range shot over the bar from Lee, and Shearer, pouncing on a poor restart from the German goalkeeper could not convert the resulting chance, mis-kicking his effort wide to the keeper's left. Shortly after, England's Grayson forced a save from the Germans running onto a pass from Shearer into the penalty box, although Grayson could not convert the rebound from the German keeper's initial block. On 22 minutes a naked streaker invaded the pitch. Despite the invasion, play continued around the streaker as the Germans advanced, with a German player even inadvertently passing the ball toward him, and he was led away by stewards only after he wandered off the pitch. The resulting German attack saw Bobic head a chance to the left of the goal, while an immediate reply from England was a goal from Ferdinand, ruled offside. England manager Howard Wilkinson chose to counter the early German dominance, with an “infusion of energy”, bringing on Thompson and Beresford. An immediate return was the foul that led to England's first goal. Novotny lost control of an attempted pass by Thompson down the left inside channel to Shearer, and having lost the ball to Shearer brought him down outside the penalty box as he advanced on goal. From the resulting free kick taken by Thompson, Ferdinand scored for England with a header low and to the right of the German goalkeeper. The German reply forced a last minute block of a Beinlich effort from Walker.

The second England goal came on 32 minutes after Shearer, running onto a Ferdinand pass down the right channel, was adjudged to have been dragged back by Pflügler, well outside the penalty box. Thompson's resulting free kick beat the German wall and passed the outstretched German keeper high and to his left. Another immediate German reply saw a Bobic effort saved in front of goal, although he was ruled offside. On 34 minutes Albertz forced a block from Beasant having run through the England defenders onto a pass from Beinlich from inside the German half. A chance for England to lead the match for the first time came on 34 minutes, when Lee latched onto a poor German clearance and chipped the ball into Shearer who headed the ball back to Gascoigne, running into the centre of the penalty area. Instead of shooting however, Gascoigne passed it back to Shearer, whose saved shot was ruled offside. The first half ended with a free kick passing over the bar from Shearer, and the shot resulting from a long Shearer run into the box from the left wing blocked by Novotny.

=== Second half ===
The Germans started the second half with three fresh players and a returning Matthaus, the only German to be substituted in the first half. Immediately after the restart, a Shearer chance on goal was thwarted after the linesman blew for offside due to the retreating Ferdinand. The first 15 minutes of the second half were otherwise quiet, except for Beinlich missing a shot wide right on 51 minutes, having intercepted onto a poor pass out from Beasant. On 62 minutes, a Beardsley run into the box forced a blocked shot from Buchwald. After a foul by Lee on Borowka, the resulting free kick by Beinlich in a similar position to England's second goal passed over the bar. On 69 minutes a lobbed shot over the bar from Helmer from outside the penalty box came close for the Germans. Immediately afterwards, a long range Shearer shot forced a save from Reck diving down to his left.

Singer Craig David was the first celebrity brought into the game, bringing fresh legs into the England attack, and who on 72 minutes forced a save from Reck from a speculative shot along the ground. Howey then cleared the ball from Bobic lining up the clear chance of a header from just outside the 6 yard box. By 73 minutes, the Germans had switched to a 4–3–4 attacking formation to regain their lead, bringing immediate pressure, resulting in Beasant saving with a dive to his left from a Marschall shot, on a diagonal run in the box, and Bobic hitting the side netting from the resulting corner. Another scare for England came on 76 minutes when a Howey clearance on the line of a cross heading for Bobic looped straight into the air, but was safely collected by Beasant on the goal line. A minute later, a long range shot from Albertz hit the underside of the bar, bouncing back into play from the goal line, followed by Reck gathering the ball from the feet of Craig David at the other end of the pitch.

The decisive goal of the game came when Lee intercepted a German pass in the England half, and lofted a pass to Shearer making a run through the German centre-backs halfway into their half. The chasing Novotny eventually brought down Shearer well inside the penalty box, with the referee deeming it to be a foul and a penalty, with the German adjudged to have taken 'ball and man' by the commentators. Shearer scored the resulting penalty past Reck's right hand side, who had guessed the correct way but could not reach the mid-height shot.

The immediate German response brought a block by Howey from an Albertz shot inside the penalty area, with Hodge also covering, and with Marschall later shooting wide. German pressure continued into the last ten minutes, Beresford blocked a Bobic volley at the last moment, and following that effort, Bobic seized on a poor Grayson back pass forcing a block from Beasant on 83 minutes, but headed the resulting rebound over the bar. An 86-minute dive from Shearer brought German protests, although the game ended precisely after 90 minutes of play with no stoppage time.

As match winners, the Bobby Robson trophy was lifted by Peter Beardsley and Paul Gascoigne, before the whole team performed a lap of honour of the stadium.
