= International Apostrophe Day =

Annual event dedicated to the apostrophe

- Type: International
- Date: 15 August
- Next time: 15 August 2027
- Frequency: Annual

International Apostrophe Day is an annual event, held on 15 August to celebrate the apostrophe punctuation mark. It was created by journalist David Marsh in August 2011, and held on different dates in its early years. The day saw a resurgence of interest in 2023 due to the Apostrophe Protection Society, and it became fixed on 15 August.

== History ==
International Apostrophe Day was created on 18 August 2011, by journalist David Marsh, who was editor of The Guardian's style guide at the time. He later described launching International Apostrophe Day "to encourage better use of this humble piece of punctuation", but also that "The aim is to be positive and celebrate the apostrophe, not just poke fun at people who get it wrong." It was held on the third Friday of August in 2012 (17 August) (Note: International Apostrophe Day was originally planned for 18 August 2012, but this was changed to 17 August.) and 2013 (16 August), and was initially planned for that day in 2014 (15 August), but was postponed until 25 September "Owing to illness, and the current world shortage of correctly used apostrophes". In 2015 it was held on 24 September, with Marsh saying "it's always towards the end of September" at a talk given at the 2015 Plain Language Association International conference in Dublin.

I've run out of food.
I'm going to eat the dogs.
What apostrophe?

— Apostrophe Vigilante (@ApostropheLaw), winner of the 2013 International Apostrophe Day haiku competition

International Apostrophe Day competitions were run by Marsh on Twitter, using the #apostropheday hashtag. These included a haiku competition (2013), and "the cleverest, wittiest tweet demonstrating how to use the apostrophe well" (2014).

Marsh retired on 1 August 2016, but International Apostrophe Day continued to be celebrated, being described in 2018 by graphic designer Nigel French as a day "when funny examples of misused apostrophes light up social media feeds. Make sure your work isn't among them." The date it was held on was not fixed around this time, with some sources saying the third Friday of August, while others said 15 August.

The Apostrophe Protection Society was relaunched by Bob McCalden in 2022, who revived interest in International Apostrophe Day the following year. The date was fixed on 15 August, with McCalden saying "Note that some sources state that it's on 16 August, but I'm going with the 15th, as that's what most sources reference". He described the event, saying "What began as a light-hearted celebration of punctuation has continued each August, inspiring articles, quizzes, competitions and plenty of discussion about whether the apostrophe is thriving, struggling or even necessary at all." It has continued to be celebrated in subsequent years.

== See also ==
- Apostrophe Protection Society
- National Punctuation Day – 24 September (US)
- National Lemon Meringue Pie Day – also held on 15 August
- Lists of holidays § Unofficial holidays, awareness days, and other observances
