= StudioSTL =

Organizations based in St. Louis

StudioSTL is a St. Louis based non-profit that aims to develop writing skills in youth aged 6–18.

== Background ==
Modeled after Dave Eggers' 826 Valencia in San Francisco, StudioSTL was formed in 2005 by seven St. Louis area professionals: Pam Bliss, Elizabeth Ketcher, Cherlyn Michaels, John Pankey, Rachel Rowe, Suzie Schmidt and Erik Smetana. Co-founder Elizabeth Ketcher served as the organization's executive director, overseeing day-to-day operations.

StudioSTL consisted of a writing studio, a loyal volunteer base, and collaborative partnerships. The non-profit brought together authors, educators and artists with youth ages 6–18 to develop writing skills to be used in life, work, and school. StudioSTL based their programs on the belief that a literary toolbox and writing skills are indispensable lifelong gifts.

In 2008, StudioSTL entered the Social Entrepreneurship and Innovation Competition at Washington University in St. Louis. The 8-month long competition is sponsored by Wash U's Skandalaris Center for Entrepreneurial Studies. After competing in several rounds with 24 other teams, StudioSTL won the $35,000 YouthBridge Award. This milestone enabled StudioSTL to put their plans to grow into action.

The written works of the StudioSTL young authors were published as books through the organization's established publishing enterprise. The revenue earned from the sale of the publications funded additional youth writing programs. Through helping St. Louis-area youth express themselves through writing, StudioSTL earned a reputation as a leader in writers' programs locally and nationally.

== Publications ==
Students become published authors through the StudioSTL publications such as:

- The StudioSTL Magazine is written by middle school and high school students from across the metro region. The magazines feature original poetry, fiction, essays and artwork perfected during programs in the studio.
- Anthology II: The Story Lies Behind the Eyes is the most recent StudioSTL publication, making its debut to the public in May 2009. This compilation of poems, songs, and short stories is the work of American Literature students at Clyde C. Miller Career Academy in St. Louis. Educators Andrew Gallagher and Staci Christian worked with StudioSTL's Christian Schaeffer to create an environment that enabled the students to write pieces ranging from simple stories to complex poems of love, loss, and friendship. St. Louis citizen Ernie Isley of The Isley Brothers penned the forward and spoke at the books premiere party.
- How My Life Has Been Since I Got Older is a book of poetry and reflection written by seventh grade students from Curtis Bishop Middle School. Guided by the Teach for America teacher Matt Picard and StudioSTL mentors, students were able to set aside awkwardness and uncertainty to write about changes in their life.
- Anthology I: Self-Portraits is compiled of self-portraits written by students of Clyde C. Miller Career Academy and University City High School. Published in November 2007, Anthology I was the first StudioSTL publication to open its readers eyes to a first-hand account of the students' struggles to balance adult issues such gang violence and homelessness while trying to succeed in school and life.

== Events ==
WordFest, commonly known as the Olympics of Word Games, passed its torch for the first time in January 2009. This annual game night for the StudioSTL community consists of tournaments in Boggle, Bananagrams, Scattergories, Word Finds, Word Scrambles, Taboo, Crosswords, WordDarts, and Team Trivia.

StudioSTL celebrates National Punctuation Day annually and participates in Clayton, MO's The Big Read.
