= The "Blog" of "Unnecessary" Quotation Marks =

Former blog about the misuse of English quotation marks

- Website type: blog
- Available in: English
- Creator: Bethany Keeley
- Website: www.unnecessaryquotes.com
- Registration: None
- Launched: July 1, 2005

The "Blog" of "Unnecessary" Quotation Marks is a blog about the misuse of English quotation marks. The blog features photographs of signs, notes and advertisements that misuse quotation marks, usually intended as emphasis. Most photographs are reader submissions, curated and commented on by blog author Bethany Keeley-Jonker, who generally intentionally misinterprets the depicted sign.

== History ==
The blog was started in 2005, and after being featured on Yahoo! became an Internet phenomenon.

In September 2016, nearly a year after the previous post, Keeley-Jonker announced that she would no longer be updating the blog, but in March 2020, making "absolutely no promises about the long term", she began updating it again, suggesting that "people wouldn't mind something silly to look at" during the COVID-19 pandemic.

== Influence ==
The theme of the blog has become an Internet meme. On occasion, some businesses will correct their signs after being featured on the blog. In May 2008, Blogger removed unnecessary quotation marks from a cancel button on the service's delete page.

== Other media ==
A related book was published by Chronicle Books in July 2010. The book is titled The Book of "Unnecessary" Quotation Marks.

== See also ==
- Amphibology
- Apostrophe Protection Society
- Scare quotes
