= Sir Bobby Robson Foundation =

British cancer research charity

- Founded: 25 March 2008
- Founder: Sir Bobby Robson; Dr Ruth Plummer, Northern Institute for Cancer Research
- Type: UK registered charity (Newcastle upon Tyne Hospitals NHS Charity, No. 1057213)
- Location: Swalwell, Tyne and Wear, England
- Region served: North East England
- Key people: Patrons: Alan Shearer; Steve Gibson; Mick Mills; Niall Quinn; Robbie Elliott
- Endowment: £2.5m (September 2010 total)
- Website: sirbobbyrobsonfoundation.org.uk

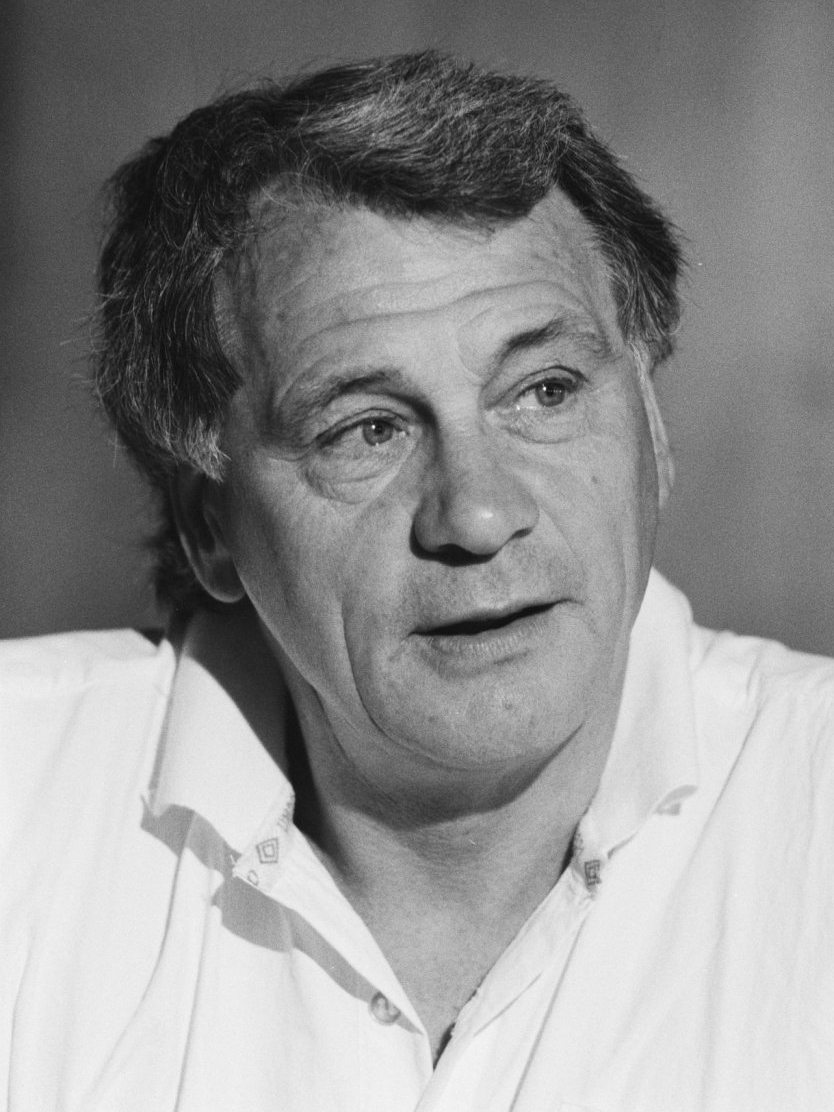
Sir Bobby Robson.

The Sir Bobby Robson Foundation is a British cancer research charity which raises money to fund the early detection and treatment of cancer, and clinical trials of anti-cancer drugs. Based in the North East of England, the Foundation was launched on 25 March 2008 in the name of Sir Bobby Robson, himself a cancer sufferer five times since 1992, and who died of the disease on 31 July 2009.

== Activities ==
The initial goal of the Foundation was to raise £500,000 to fund equipment for a cancer research centre being built in the Freeman Hospital, Newcastle upon Tyne, to be named The Sir Bobby Robson Cancer Trials Research Centre. Once this was secure, the Foundation would turn its attention to funding other cancer related projects in the North East of England. The Foundation raised £260,000 in just over two weeks.

By November 2008 it had raised over £1 million, double the initial funding target of £500,000 set in February, which itself was passed in just eight weeks. By 15 October 2009, just over 6 weeks after Sir Bobby's death and nearly 19 months after its launch, the charity had raised over £2 million. It passed the £2.5m mark in September 2010.

The Foundation had its origins in a wish by Sir Bobby on the eve of his 75th birthday to leave behind a legacy for future cancer victims in the North East and give something back to the NHS in return for the care he had received in his own battles against cancer. In February 2007 Robson had been diagnosed with terminal cancer, and had begun chemotherapy treatment to keep it under control. Robson had initially been reluctant to use his name to raise money, but did so invoking the Geordie idiom, "Shy bairns (children) get nothing".

The foundation is a UK registered charity, and is based in Swalwell village, Tyne and Wear. The Foundation operates in an area stretching north to Northumbria, south to Sunderland, and west to Cumbria, and supports the activities of the Newcastle upon Tyne Hospitals NHS Foundation Trust. The Foundation is registered with the Charity Commission as the Newcastle upon Tyne Hospitals NHS Charity

The idea for the foundation came about after Sir Bobby was told by his doctor that an upcoming NHS cancer research centre had no funds in place for equipment. This centre was the Early Cancer Trials Unit in the Northern Centre for Cancer Care (NCCC), one of the largest cancer centres in the United Kingdom. The unit was to be part of the consolidation of the NCCC into a new £80 million centre being built at the Freeman Hospital. Parts of the new NCCC site opened in October 2008, and it was due to be fully open by early 2009.

The 28 December 2008 football match at St James' Park between Newcastle United and Liverpool was designated the Sir Bobby Robson day by the Newcastle United Supporters Club, celebrating the man and raising funds for the foundation.

The Sir Bobby Robson Cancer Trials Research Centre part of the NCCC was opened on 20 February 2008, staffed by academics from Newcastle University, and medics from the NHS Trust. Robson opened the centre two days after his 76th birthday, with a surprise 15-minute speech, having been expected to attend the ceremony but not speak. In front of guests including Fabio Capello, Alan Shearer and Peter Beardsley, Robson vowed to carry on fundraising.

By the time of the research centre's opening, the Foundation had raised £1.2m. In addition to equipping the research centre, further fundraising by the Foundation had enabled the funding of two 3-year training posts to be supported by the centre, one being a research nursing position, and the other a fellowship doctor post. The Foundation has also funded other projects. This has included the commitment to purchase a Biomarker Generator, an ultra-compact cyclotron from Tennessee-based ABT Molecular Imaging. The first of its kind in Europe and second in the world, it was to be housed in a new clean-room facility built in the School of Chemistry at Newcastle University. It has also raised money for relevant equipment and building works at the Royal Victoria Infirmary hospital.

On 24 January 2009 it was announced the famous Italia '90 World Cup semi-final loss against West Germany, in which Robson's England team were beaten 4–3 on penalties after a 1–1 draw, would be replayed as the Sir Bobby Robson Trophy match in aid of the Foundation. It was held on 26 July at St James' Park, and would feature players from the original World Cup squads and other special guests, with the winning team being awarded the Sir Bobby Robson Trophy.

Sir Bobby died on 31 July 2009, shortly after attending the tribute match. At the time of his death, the Foundation had raised £1.6m. Donations totalling £156,000 were received by the Foundation in the 18 days following his death.

The Foundation benefited from special commemorative kits and scarves produced for the Championship match between Newcastle United F.C. and Ipswich Town F.C., two of Sir Bobby's former clubs, held on 26 September 2009 at Ipswich's Portman Road ground. After the game, which Newcastle won 4–0, the shirts were signed by the players and auctioned individually on eBay. The auction raised £31,187 for the Foundation, who pledged it to the building of a teenage cancer unit at the Royal Victoria Infirmary.

On 15 October 2009, coinciding with the Foundation reaching the £2m mark, it was announced that Alan Shearer was to be the Foundation's new patron, after being asked by Sir Bobby's family to carry on his work. This was followed with the appointment of three further patrons during 2010. Steve Gibson, chairman of Middlesbrough F.C., Mick Mills, Robson's former captain at Ipswich Town F.C., and Niall Quinn, chairman of Sunderland F.C.

In November 2009 the Foundation was to launch a DVD titled a 'Knight To Remember', profiling Sir Bobby's life, including his last interviews and contributions from friends, family, and the world of football, with 75% of proceeds going to the Foundation. The DVD was to feature a version of Blaydon Races sung by Jimmy Nail, Kevin Whately and Tim Healy of Auf Wiedersehen, Pet fame, with an additional verse written in dedication of Sir Bobby.

And now a word for Bobby Robson, hero of the Toon; A football man, a gentleman, who never let we doon; A friendly word, a cheery smile, and brave right to the end; We're proud to say your one of wors, Sir Bob... Auf Wiedersehen

On 29 November 2009 the Foundation was to be presented with the John Fotheringham Award by the North East branch of the Football Writers' Association at their annual dinner.

Marking the occasion of gaining the support of the East Coast train operating company, the express franchise for Scotland – Newcastle – London routes, in March 2011 Robson's widow Elsie and Alan Shearer named one of its locomotives Sir Bobby Robson. The Foundation has also been promoted by the local bus company Go North East, known for their individual branding of routes, who from June 2010 branded four buses used on the 30-minute frequency X25 express, which runs between Langley Park where Robson lived, and Newcastle City Centre (Eldon Square bus station), with Foundation information and an image of Robson.

== See also ==
- Cancer Research UK
- Cancer in the United Kingdom
