= Apostrophe Protection Society =

British nonprofit organisation

The Apostrophe Protection Society is a UK-based society with "the specific aim of preserving the correct use of this currently much abused punctuation mark" across the English-speaking world. Founded in 2001, it is now chaired by Bob McCalden.

== Early history: 2001–2019 ==
The Apostrophe Protection Society (APS) was founded in 2001 by John Richards, a retired sub-editor, in response to his observations of widespread incorrect use of the apostrophe. The original members of the society were Richards and his son Stephen. By June 2001, following an article in The Daily Telegraph, there were 257 members. Initially, the society's work focused on the town of Boston, Lincolnshire, where Richards lived. Its first successful correction was getting the local library to write "CDs" instead of "CD's".

The society's website includes many claimed examples of apostrophe "abuse"; it says it is intended to help correct, rather than chide, offenders. Richards said he had a standard, polite letter that explained the basic rules for apostrophe use, which he sent to supporters to forward to offending businesses and other organisations.

One issue that the society intervened in more than once was the tendency of businesses originally named after people not to include apostrophes in their names. In 2006, the society called for apostrophes to be used in the names of Harrods, Selfridges, and Currys. In 2012, Waterstones decided to remove the apostrophe it had used until then, a move to which Richards objected, saying "It's just plain wrong. It's grammatically incorrect. If Sainsbury's and McDonald's can get it right, then why can't Waterstone's?".

Place names and signage also came in for criticism. In 2009, when Birmingham City Council decided to remove apostrophes from all its street signs, the APS objected in strong terms. Richards described the move as "a terrible example", "retrograde", and "utter chaos". In 2013, the society objected to a similar change being made by Mid Devon District Council and the council reversed its decision a week later. Following that apparent success in May, in June Richards backed a campaign begun by "the Apostrophe Vigilante" to have the apostrophe reinstated in the name of Princes Street in Edinburgh, from which it had been removed in the 1830s. As of 2019, that campaign has not been successful.

Other complaints involved the renaming of Dundee Council's Children and Families' Service to remove the apostrophe, and a temporary road sign in Hartlepool that read "Parking Bay's Suspended".

In 2001, Richards won the satirical Ig Nobel Prize for "his efforts to protect, promote, and defend the differences between plural and possessive".

In December 2019, when Richards was 95, he announced that the society was shutting down, saying that, despite its efforts, "fewer organisations and individuals are now caring about the correct use of the apostrophe". Richards died on 30 March 2021, aged 97. A tribute appeared on the legacy APS website.

== Relaunch: 2022–present ==
In February 2022, Bob McCalden, a former IT director, took over ownership of the APS and re-launched it, together with a new website.

Membership was reintroduced in early 2023 and at the end of 2024 stood at almost 4,600 across the UK, US, and the wider English-speaking world.

The society produces a regular newsletter for its members, with a general update from its chair on apostrophe-related news and current campaigns.

== See also ==
- International Apostrophe Day
- The "Blog" of "Unnecessary" Quotation Marks
