= China–Uzbekistan relations =

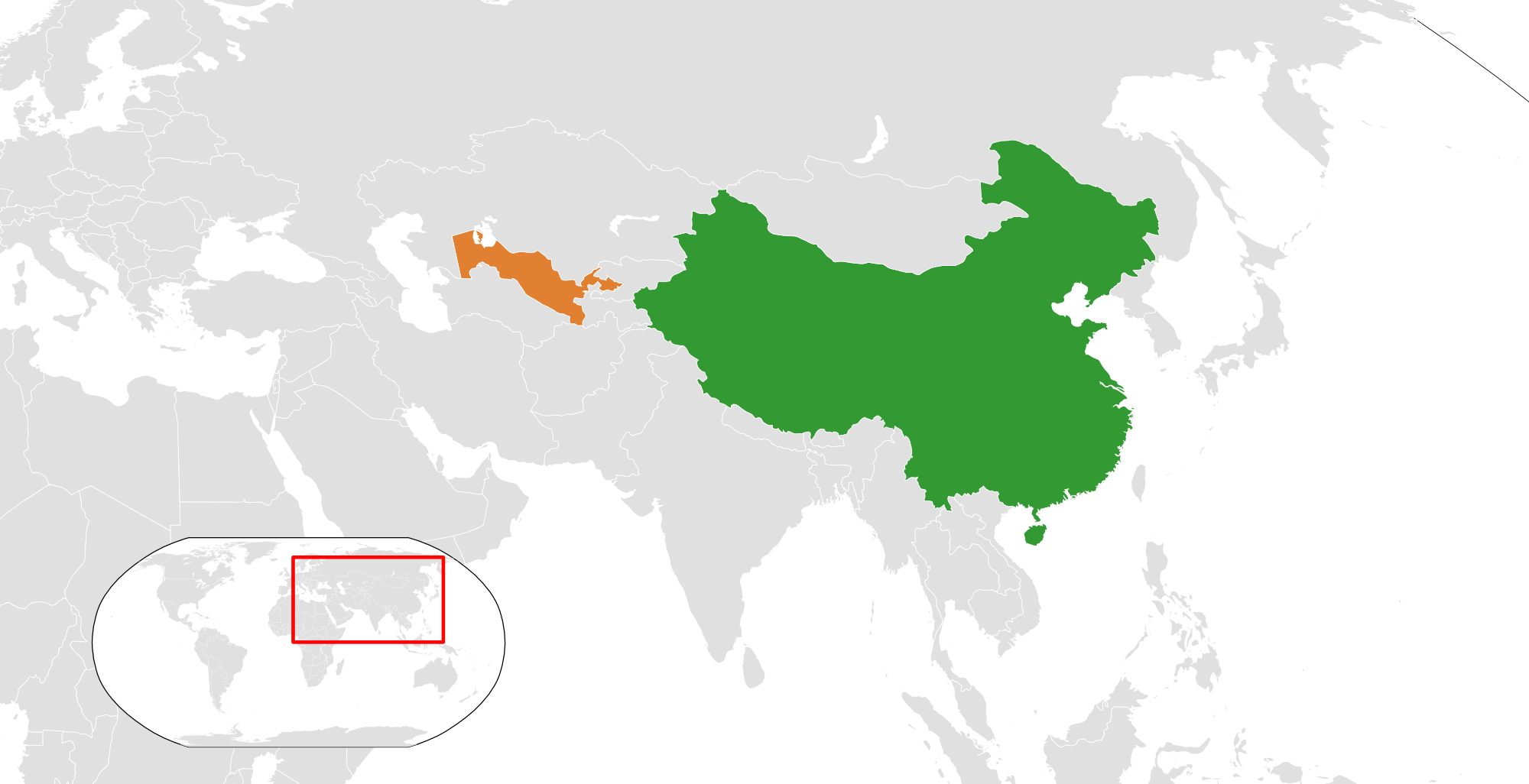

- China: Uzbekistan

Diplomatic mission
- Chinese Embassy, Tashkent: Uzbek Embassy, Beijing

Envoy
- Ambassador Jiang Yan: Ambassador Farhod Nuritdinovich Arziev

China–Uzbekistan relations (Note: Uzbek: Xitoy-O‘zbekiston munosabatlari, cyrillized: Хитой-Ўзбекистон муносабатлари, arabized: خىتاي-ئوزبېكىستان مۇناسەبەتلەرى, pronounced [χɨ̥ˌtʰɒj‿ɵzbekɪ̥sˈtʰɒn mʊnɒsɐbɐtlæˈɾɪ]; Chinese: 中國—烏茲別克斯坦關係, simplified: 中国—乌兹别克斯坦关系, romanized: Zhōngguó—Wūzībiékèsītǎn guānxì, cyrillized: Җунгуй–Вузбекстан гуанщи, arabized: جْوقُوَ–وُذِبِیَكْسْتً قُوًاسِ, pronounced [ʈʂʊ́ŋkwǒ wútsɹ̩́pjěkʰɤ̂sɹ̩́tʰàn kwánɕî]) were established on 2 January 1992, following the independence of Uzbekistan in 1991. The two countries maintain close economic ties, and China is a major importer of natural gas from Uzbekistan. Both countries are members of the Shanghai Cooperation Organization.

== History ==
External image
- "The Lioness" (1483) Rossi & Rossi

According to the Ming Shilu, ambassadors from the Uzbek Khanate and Bukhara Khanate corresponded with Ming China more than 20 times between 1488 and 1618. The Min Shilu also tells that in 1483, in one of the embassies from Sultan Ahmed Mirza, consisting of Ambassador Paluvan and Khoja Mahmad, two lions were brought as a tribute to the Chinese court. Firstly, emperor official refused to allow the embassy to cross the border, but the emperor himself ordered the lions to be brought to court. The emperor's artist created a painting depicting the ambassadors and the lioness called ‘Hussayni’, which means ‘Beauty’.The painting is currently housed in the 'Rossi & Rossi Gallery' in Hong Kong.

China recognized Uzbekistan's independence on 27 December 1991 and the two countries established relations on 2 January 1992. Both countries signed the "China-Uzbek Treaty of Friendship and Cooperation" in 2005, during Uzbek leader Islam Karimov's meeting with Chinese leader Hu Jintao in Beijing.

Uzbekistan and China signed a currency swap agreement in 2011.

Uzbekistan has cooperated with China in extraditing Uyghur activists from the country. In July 2019, UN ambassadors of 37 countries, including Uzbekistan, signed a joint letter to the United Nations Human Rights Council defending China's persecution of Uyghurs. Uzbekistan was one of 16 countries that defended China in 2019 but did not do so in 2020.

Uzbek Prime Minister Abdulla Aripov called China Uzbekistan's "closest partner" on a 26 August 2019 meeting.

== Economic relations ==
China is the second-largest importer of raw materials from Uzbekistan. As of 2024, significant Chinese investment in the country has resulted in approximately 600 Chinese-Uzbek joint enterprises.

China has also increasing its development loans to Uzbekistan. Uzbekistan joined the Belt and Road Initiative (BRI) in 2015. China regards Uzbekistan as a critical part of the BRI.

As China reduces its reliance on imported natural gas, currently accounting for about 62% of its energy mix but projected to decline due to slowing economic growth and a national carbon neutrality target by 2060, Central Asian gas exporters, including Uzbekistan, are reevaluating their positions. A May 2025 report by Eurasianet, drawing on BloombergNEF’s Energy Transition Supply Chains 2025, underscores China's dominance in global clean energy manufacturing, controlling over 70% of production in solar, wind, and battery technologies. With 76% of global investment in clean-tech facilities occurring in China in 2024 and renewables now supplying around 80% of its new electricity demand, China's softening gas appetite may reportedly limit future energy exports from the region.

== Taiwan ==
Uzbekistan follows the one China principle, and recognizes government of the People's Republic of China as the sole legal government representing the whole of China and Taiwan as "an inalienable part" of China. Uzbekistan also supports all efforts by the PRC to "achieve national reunification" and opposes Taiwan independence.

== Military relations ==
Chinese–Uzbek military relations have grown in recent years as part of China's broader effort to expand its role as an arms supplier in Central Asia. Traditionally reliant on Russian military equipment, Uzbekistan has begun diversifying its defense partnerships, partly due to a decline in Russian arms exports following its 2022 invasion of Ukraine. In 2024, China sold anti-aircraft systems to Uzbekistan, and by April 2025, reports suggested Tashkent was considering purchasing JF-17 fighter jets; a joint China–Pakistan project known for its multi-role capabilities. If finalized, the deal would signal a shift in regional defense alignments and underscore Beijing's increasing influence in Central Asia's arms market.

== Cultural and educational relations ==
In 2013, Uzbekistan and China signed a cultural exchange agreement to increase engagement in culture, education, science, and technology. The first exchange per the agreement occurred in 2017, during which seminars, exhibitions, and performances were held. These exchanges have been repeated since.

China provides support for the preservation of and restoration of cultural heritage sites in Uzbekistan. For instance, in 2014, China and Uzbekistan made the decision to collaborate on the restoration of the ancient city of Khiva, concentrating on the renovation of Amir to’ra madrasasi, a religious academy, as well as the Hasan Murad Qushbegi Mosque. The restoration project was completed in 2019.

China Central Television (CCTV) and Uzbekistan's National Television and Radio Corporation (UzTRK) cooperate to produce joint programs and documentaries.

Uzbekistan has two Confucius Institutes.

== Public opinion ==
As of 2026, public opinion of China in Uzbekistan has trended favorably, with surveys showing high support for Chinese investment, infrastructure projects, and technology. Support for Chinese energy and infrastructure projects in Uzbekistan exceeds 75%. Younger people in Uzbekistan tend to have more favorable views of China than older age cohorts.

== Resident diplomatic missions ==
- China has an embassy in Tashkent.
- Uzbekistan has an embassy in Beijing and consulates-general in Guangzhou and Shanghai.

== See also ==
- Foreign relations of China
- Foreign relations of Uzbekistan
- Chinese people in Uzbekistan
- Uzbeks in China
