= Modifier letter turned comma =

Punctuation-like letter (ʻ)

The modifier letter turned comma ʻ is character resembling a comma that has been turned and raised to ascender level. Unlike a comma, it is a letter, not a piece of punctuation. It is used in a number of Polynesian alphabets as a letter representing a glottal stop, such as the ʻokina in Hawaiian. It was also used in the Uzbek alphabet to form the letters Oʻ and Gʻ, which corresponded to Ў and Ғ respectively in the Uzbek Cyrillic alphabet.

== Encoding ==
The phrase ʻŌlelo Hawaiʻi, meaning "Hawaiian language", set in Gentium Book typeface. The marks preceding the opening letter ⟨Ō⟩ and concluding letter ⟨i⟩ are ʻokinas. In the second line, the character-variant option for large apostrophe-like letters is set. The entire phrase is bracketed by left and right single quotation marks.

The letter turned comma is encoded at U+02BB ʻ MODIFIER LETTER TURNED COMMA, in the Spacing Modifier Letters Unicode block.

In Unicode code charts, the representative glyph used for U+02BB looks identical to that used for the U+2018 ‘ LEFT SINGLE QUOTATION MARK, but this is not true for all fonts. The primary practical difference between the 'letter turned comma' and 'left single quotation mark' is that the 'letter turned comma' is defined in Unicode as a modifier letter [a letter or symbol typically written next to another letter that it modifies in some way] whereas 'left single quotation mark' is defined a type of punctuation mark and an opening quotation mark. For human readers, the difference is imperceptible and unimportant but it has significance in text processing applications.

== Use ==
The character is used in many Polynesian languages as ʻokina, a unicameral consonant letter used within the Latin script to mark the phonemic glottal stop.

In the Uzbek alphabet, the letter turned comma is used to write the letters Oʻ (Cyrillic Ў) and Gʻ (Cyrillic Ғ).

It is sometimes used in Latin transliterations of the Hebrew letter ʻáyin and the Arabic letter ʻayn.

The letter turned comma is also often used to romanize aspirated consonants in Armenian.

== See also ==
- ' (disambiguation)
- ʻOkina – Letter of the Latin alphabet
- Modifier letter apostrophe – Phonetic modifier letter (ʼ)
- Spacing Modifier Letters
