= Unicameral (disambiguation) =

To be unicameral is to have only one legislative or parliamentary chamber.

Unicameral may also refer to:

- The Unicameral, the supreme legislative body of the State of Nebraska
- Unicameral alphabet, an alphabet that has no case for its letters
