= Oʻ =

Letter of the Uzbek Latin alphabet

O with turned comma above right
- Oʻ oʻ

Usage
- Writing system: Latin script
- Type: alphabetic
- Language of origin: Uzbek language
- Sound values: /o/
- In Unicode: U+004F U+02BB, U+006F U+02BB

History
- Development: O: Oʻ oʻ
- Time period: 1995 to 2026

Other
- Writing direction: Left-to-Right

Oʻ (o with turned comma above right; minuscule: oʻ) is the 25th letter in the 1995–2026 orthography of the Uzbek Latin alphabet, representing the close-mid back rounded vowel /o/. It was adopted in the May 1995 revision of the alphabet, replacing Ö. A further spelling reform in 2026 (which will come into force in April 2027) reverted the change, bringing back Ö. It was also used in the Karakalpak alphabet until 2016, when it was replaced with Ó. In the Uzbek Cyrillic alphabet, it corresponds to Ў.

== Encodings ==
In Unicode, Oʻ is not encoded as a precomposed character, but rather as a sequence of U+004F O LATIN CAPITAL LETTER O or U+006F o LATIN SMALL LETTER O and U+02BB ʻ MODIFIER LETTER TURNED COMMA. Since the modifier letter isn't readily typeable on the Uzbek Latin keyboard layouts shipped with Microsoft Windows as of 2022, the substitution of other characters such as U+0027 ' APOSTROPHE and U+2018 ‘ LEFT SINGLE QUOTATION MARK is very common. But the use of U+02BB is the only correct option, as the signs U+2018 and U+2019 fulfill the role of secondary quotation marks in the Uzbek Latin.

Character information
Preview	O		o		ʻ	
Unicode name	LATIN CAPITAL LETTER O		LATIN SMALL LETTER O		MODIFIER LETTER TURNED COMMA	
Encodings	decimal	hex	dec	hex	dec	hex
Unicode	79	U+004F	111	U+006F	699	U+02BB
UTF-8	79	4F	111	6F	202 187	CA BB
Numeric character reference	&#79;	&#x4F;	&#111;	&#x6F;	&#699;	&#x2BB;

== See also ==
- Ö
- Short U (Cyrillic)
