= ' (disambiguation) =

The ' character is represented by 39 in ASCII and U+0027 ' APOSTROPHE in Unicode. It is used as:

- Apostrophe (as straight version of the ’ character), a punctuation mark, and sometimes a diacritical mark
- Single quotation mark (as straight version of the ‘ and ’ characters)

== Informal use ==
Being supplied as standard on many keyboard layouts, it is often used in informal contexts to replace other similar looking characters that include:

=== Diacritical marks ===
- Acute accent (U+0301 ◌́ COMBINING ACUTE ACCENT), a diacritic used in many modern written languages
  - U+02CA ˊ MODIFIER LETTER ACUTE ACCENT
- Aleph (U+02BE ʾ MODIFIER LETTER RIGHT HALF RING), is the first letter of the Semitic abjads
- Apex (diacritic) (U+0301 ◌́ COMBINING ACUTE ACCENT), a diacritic used to indicate a long vowel in Latin
- Dakuten, Japanese diacritic
  - U+3099 ◌゙ COMBINING KATAKANA-HIRAGANA VOICED SOUND MARK
  - U+309A ◌゚ COMBINING KATAKANA-HIRAGANA SEMI-VOICED SOUND MARK
- Geresh (U+05F3 ׳ HEBREW PUNCTUATION GERESH), a sign in Hebrew writing
- Smooth breathing or spiritus lenis (U+1FBF ᾿ GREEK PSILI), a diacritical mark used in polytonic orthography
- Tonos (U+0384 ΄ GREEK TONOS), single diacritic that indicates stress in monotonic orthography for Modern Greek
- Keraia (diacritic) (U+0374 ʹ GREEK NUMERAL SIGN) a symbol used in Greek numerals

=== Modifier letter punctuation ===
- Modifier letter apostrophe (ʼ), a glyph used primarily to represent various glottal sounds
- Modifier letter left half ring (ʿ), a character used to transliterate the letter ayin, representing the sound ʕ
- Modifier letter right half ring (ʾ)
- Modifier letter turned comma (ʻ)

=== Other uses as accents, pronunciation, or stress ===
- ʻOkina (ʻ), commonly representing a phonemic glottal stop in various Polynesian languages
- Ejective consonant (ʼ), used in the International Phonetic Alphabet
- Greek diacritics (´)(`)(῾)(᾿), marks added to letters in Greek (particularly Ancient Greek) sometimes in combination (eg. ῞ or ῏)
- Saltillo (linguistics) (Ꞌ or ꞌ), a glottal stop consonant, ʔ
- Stress (linguistics) (ˈ), relative emphasis or prominence given to a certain syllable in a word

=== Units of measure ===
- Prime (symbol) (′), used to designate units and for other purposes in mathematics, the sciences, linguistics, and music
  - Foot (unit), a unit of length in the imperial and US customary systems of measurement
  - Minute, a unit of time
  - Minute of arc, a unit of arc

== See also ==
- Apostrophe (disambiguation)
- Comma, a punctuation mark that appears in several variants in different languages, above as well as below the baseline
  - Inverted comma, the name used in traditional British typography for the single quotation mark
