= Apostrophe (disambiguation) =

An apostrophe is a punctuation mark, represented as ’ or '.

Apostrophe may also refer to:

- Apostrophe (figure of speech), an address to a person or personified object not present
- Apostrophe ('), a 1974 album by Frank Zappa
- "Apostrophe", a song by The Doubleclicks from the 2010 album Chainmail and Cello
- Apostrophes (talk show), a French television program about books
- Apostrophes: A Book of Tributes to Masters of Music, a 1910 book

== See also ==
- ' and ʼ glyphs, each used for apostrophe and other uses.
- Apostrophe Island
- Apostrophe Protection Society
