= Hasanmurod Qushbegi mosque =

- Hasanmurod qushbegi masjidi
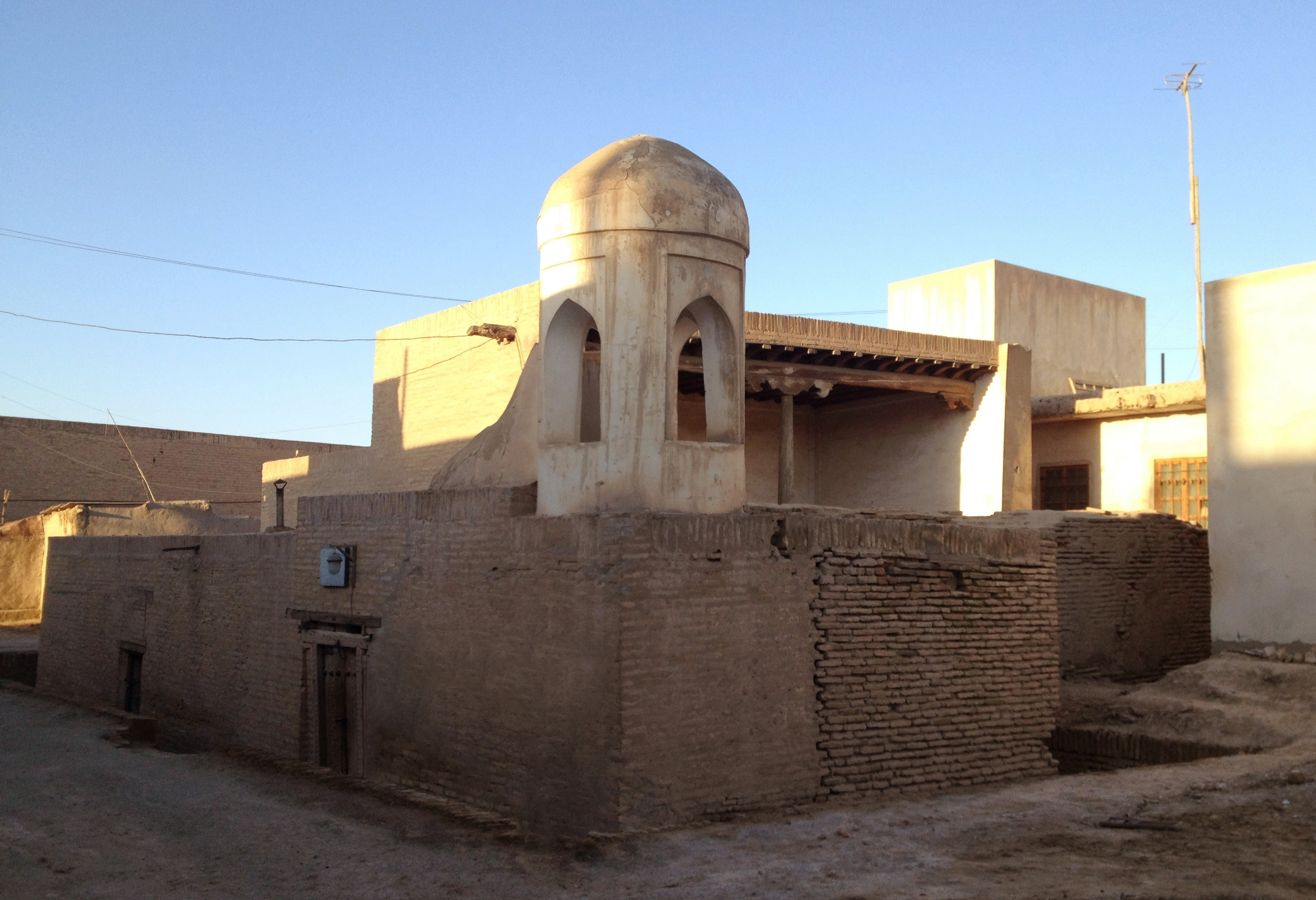
- Hasanmurod qushbegi masjidi

Religion
- Affiliation: Islam
- Region: Surxondaryo Region
- Governing body: Uzbek Government

Location
- Location: Khiva
- Country: Uzbekistan
- Interactive map of Hasanmurod Qushbegi mosque
- Coordinates: 41.37983542747305°N 60.36041835209147°E

Architecture
- Type: Mosque
- Style: Islamic Architecture

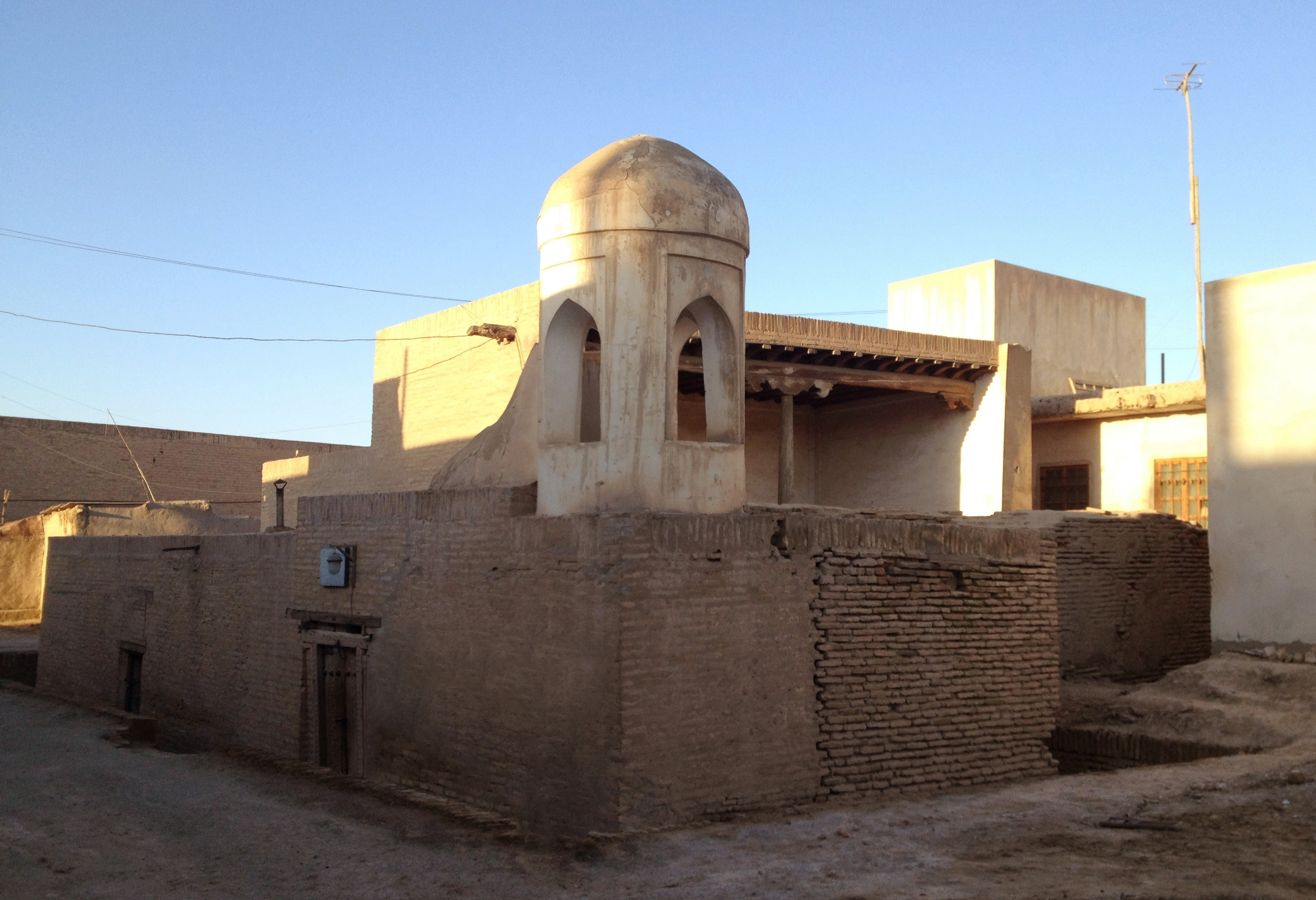
Hasan Murad Koshbegi Mosque, Khiva

Hasanmurod Qushbegi Mosque — a historical memorial site located in the city of Khiva in the Khorezm Region of Uzbekistan. The mosque was built in the late 18th to early 19th centuries near the ″Bogcha Gate″. The site is part of the Itchan Kala (or Ichan Qala) complex and is situated opposite the Amir Tura Madrasa.

The Hasanmurod Qushbegi Mosque is administratively under state ownership and managed by the Ichan Qala State Museum-Reserve.

== History and Architecture ==
The mosque was constructed towards the end of the 18th century and into the early 19th century. The building was funded and supervised by the head of the local carpet weavers, Hasanmurod Qushbegi, and his relative Shoh Niyoz.

The Hasanmurod Qushbegi Mosque is situated in close proximity to the Amir Tura Madrasa, positioned behind the Muso Tura Madrasa within the historic Ichan Qala. This mosque, though modest in size, features a well-thought-out rectangular architectural design. Its layout incorporates a square courtyard with a single-arched entrance, accommodating two-arched prayer halls and additional annexes thoughtfully situated along the northern and eastern sides of the structure.

Notably, a minaret, a later addition to the mosque, graces the northeastern corner, enhancing the mosque's overall appearance and historical significance. The mosque's exterior is adorned with elegant yet unassuming brickwork, which contributes to its understated charm. On the interior, the mihrab, the focal point of prayer within the mosque, is adorned with intricate and ornate patterns, creating a sense of reverence and awe for those who worship within its walls.

The entrance doors to the mosque are beautifully embellished with Islamic calligraphy, showcasing the cultural and religious significance of the structure. As a part of the larger ensemble of historical and architectural monuments within the Ichan Qala, the Hasanmurod Qushbegi Mosque contributes to the rich tapestry of this UNESCO World Heritage Site, preserving the history and heritage of the region for generations to come.

Unfortunately, the original main minaret of the Hasanmurod Qushbegi Mosque did not survive, and only a smaller-sized minaret at the entrance on the left side of the facade remains. Today, the mosque also houses a small prayer room on the top floor.

In 1997, the Hasanmurod Qushbegi Mosque underwent a significant restoration effort, which aimed to preserve and maintain this historical site for future generations. This restoration work was essential to ensure the continued cultural and architectural significance of the mosque. In 2017, as part of a project funded by the Chinese government, the Hasanmurod Qushbegi Mosque, along with the Amir Tura Madrasa located within the Ichan Qala complex, underwent further restoration and renovation. This grant was made possible through an agreement between the Ministry of Culture and the Ministry of Foreign Trade of Uzbekistan, signed in 2016, under the program "Restoration of Historical and Cultural Objects in the Khorezm Region".

== See also ==
- Itchan Kala
- Bogbonli masjid
- Juma mosque
