= Muhammad Rahim Khan Madrasah =

Madrasa in Khiva, Khorazm, Uzbekistan

Coordinates: 41.3785°N 60.3594°E

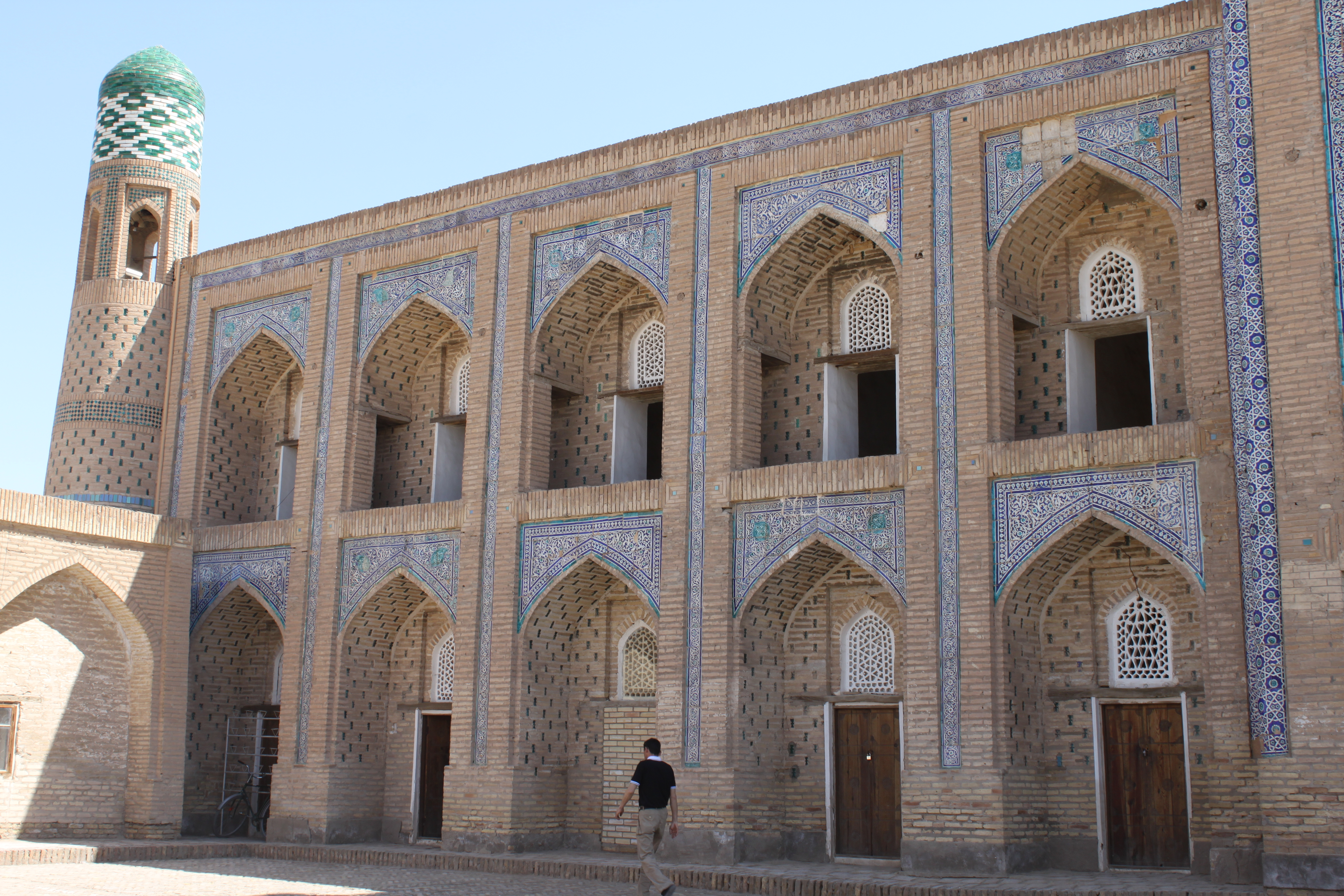
Muhammad Rahim Khan Madrasah

The Muhammad Rahim Khan Madrasah (Uzbek : Muhammad Rahimxon madrasasi) is a Madrasah in Itchan Kala, the historic old town of Khiva, Uzbekistan. It is part of the UNESCO world heritage.

== Building ==
The Muhammad Rahim Khan Madrasah is one of the largest in Khiva, and is located directly opposite the Konya Ark citadel. It has a size of 62 meters by 50 meters. It was built in 1871 on behalf of Khan Said Muhammad Rahim II (reign 1863 to 1910), who was also a well-known poet under the pseudonym Feruz Shah.
It was built as the last of the large madrasahs in Khiva. The rectangular building has a courtyard with four iwans. There are also small towers on the corners. The large entrance portal has a complicated vestibule with a five-span arcade. The student quarters of the madrasah are covered with Balkhi type domes. In addition to the living rooms, the madrasah also has utility rooms. There is a domed mosque in the south wing.

== Sources ==
- Alexey Arapov: The historical monuments of Uzbekistan. SMI-ASIA, Tashkent 2016, ISBN 978-9943-17-075-9, Chiva, p. 95.
- Ouzbékistan, guide Le Petit Futé, edition 2012
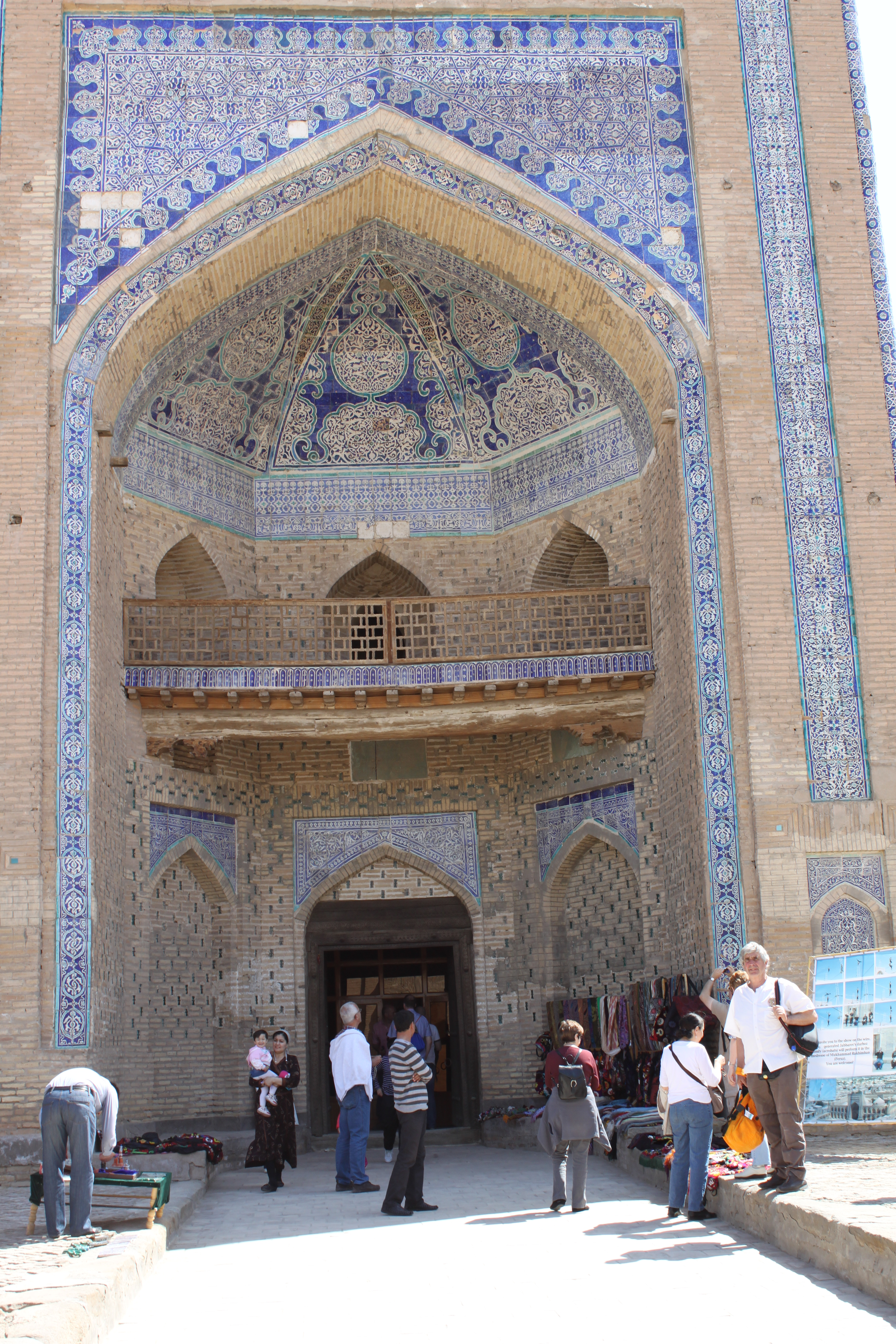
Entrance hall with Iwan.

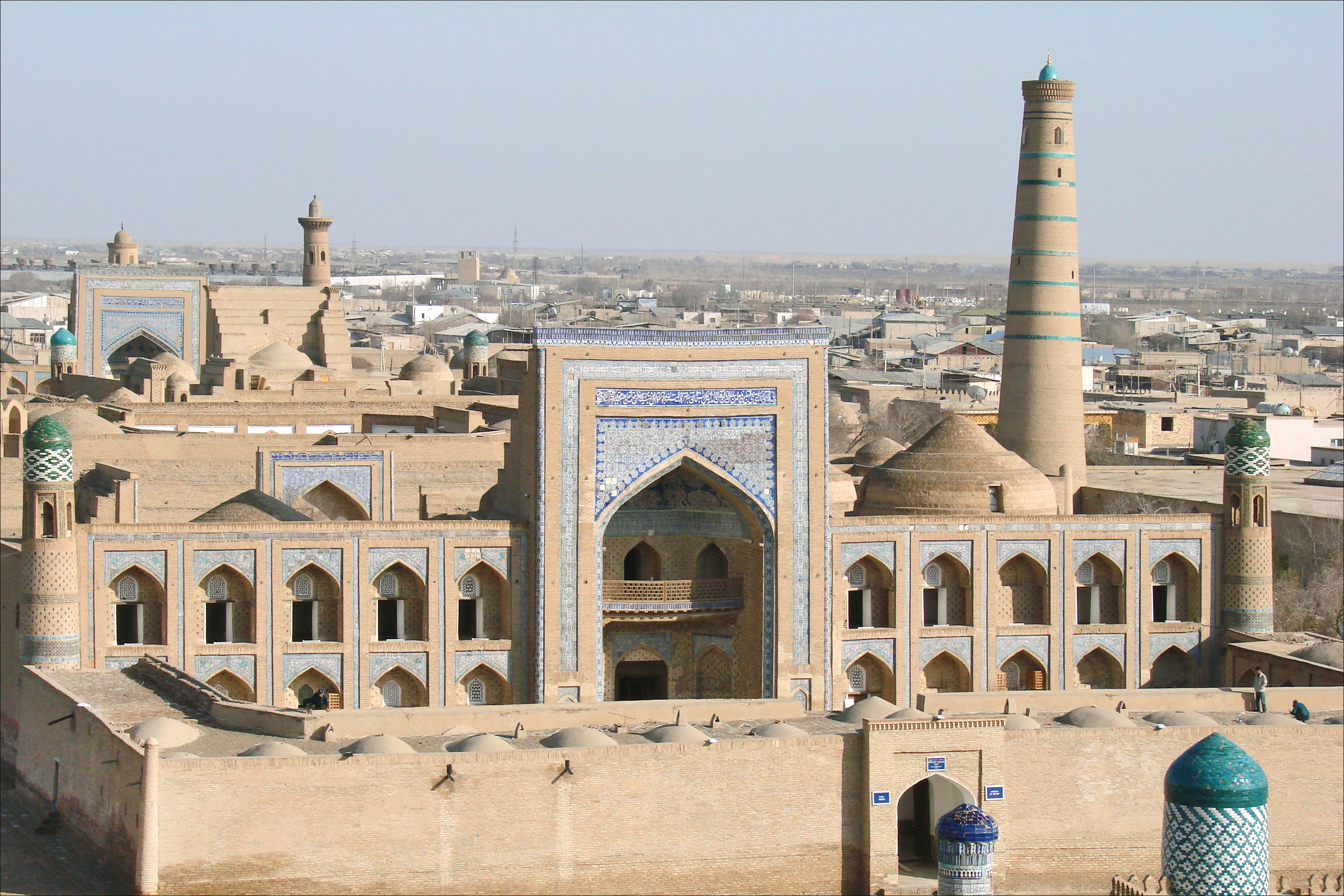
Overview

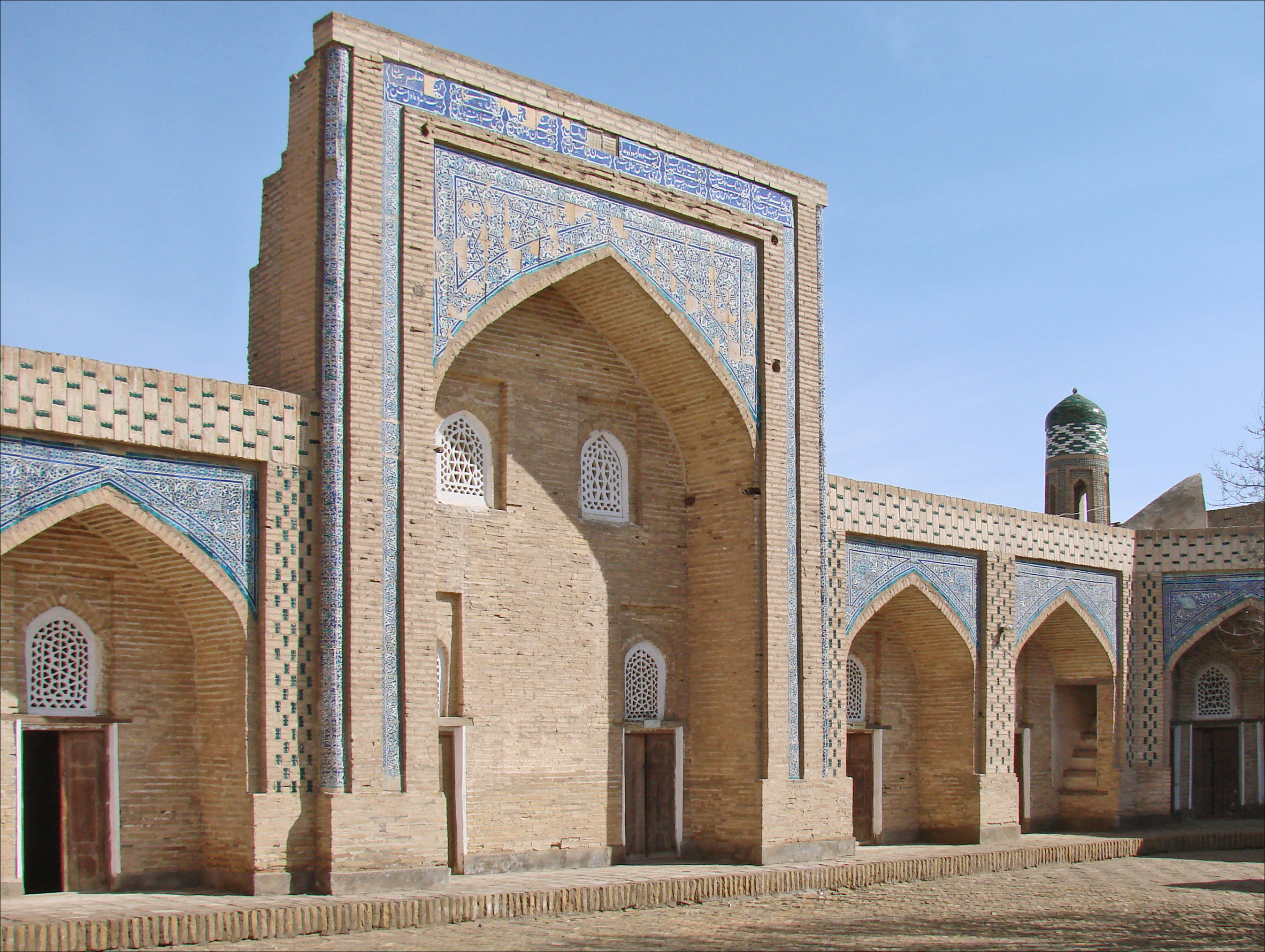
Court

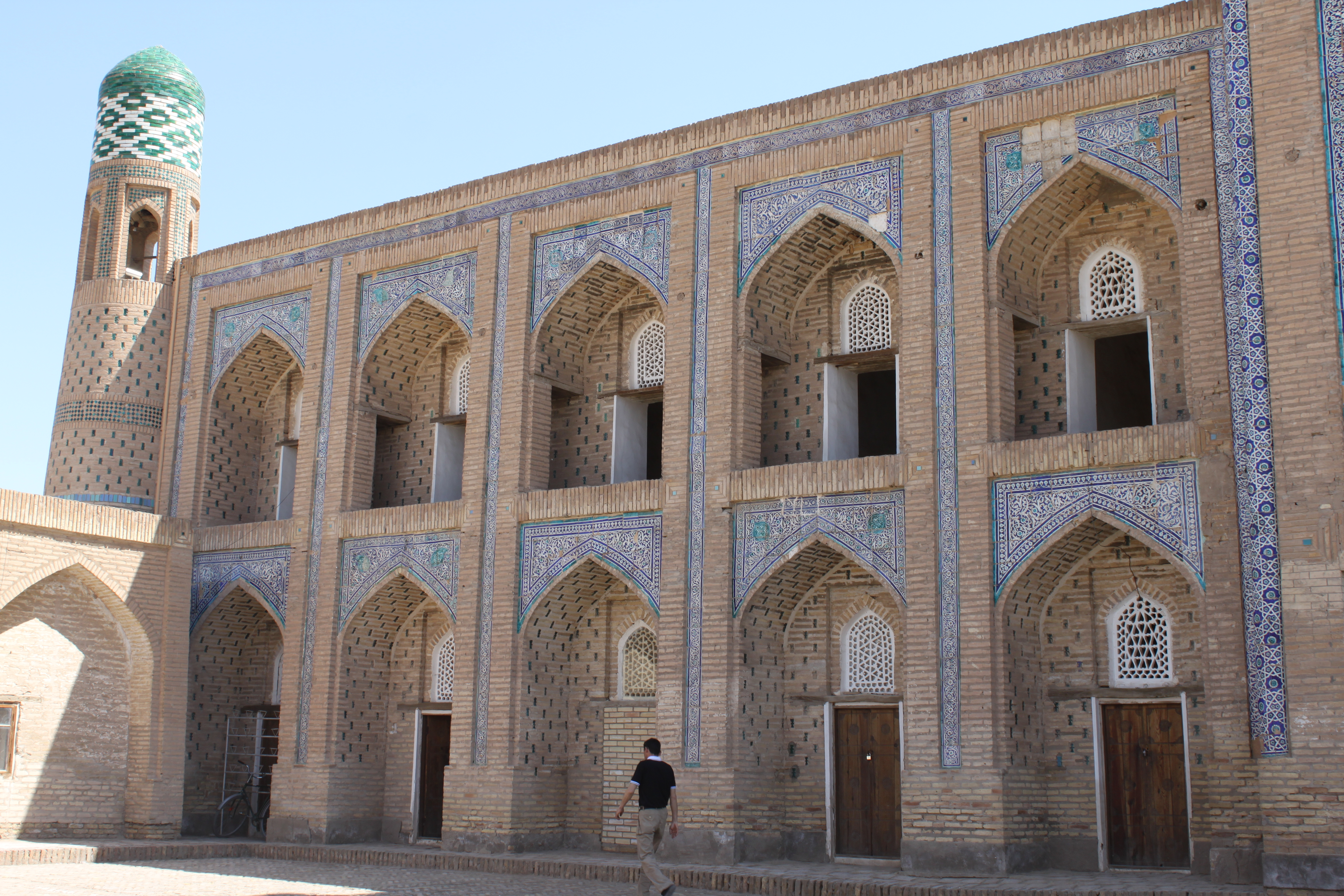
Exterior facade
