= Amir Tora Madrasah =

Madrasa in Khiva, Khorazm, Uzbekistan

- Amir Tora Madrasasi
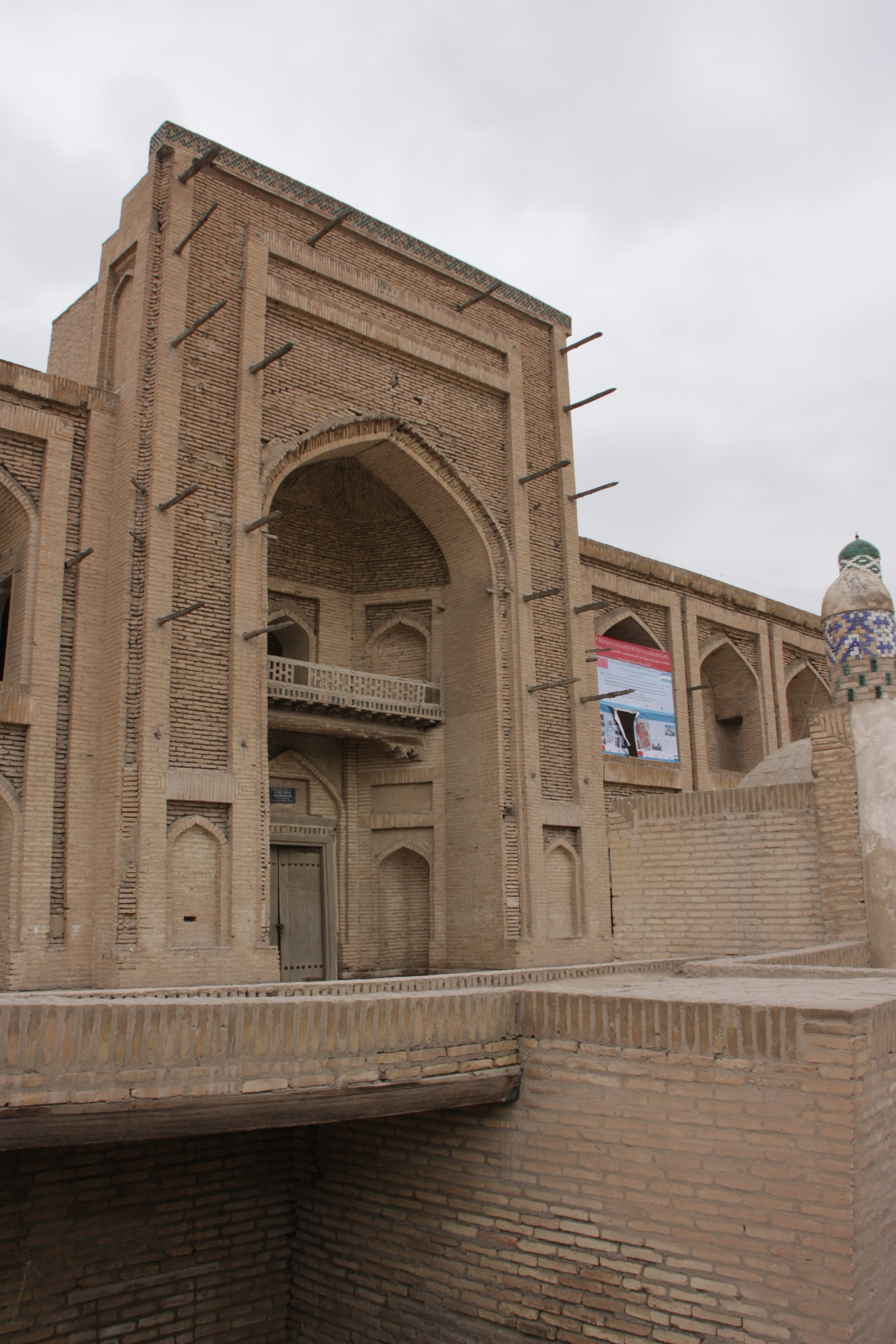
- A view of the main facade of the Amir Tora madrasa before restoration. 2017 year.
- Interactive map of the Amir Tora Madrasah area

General information
- Status: National list of immovable property objects of material and cultural heritage of Uzbekistan, under state protection
- Type: Madrasah
- Architectural style: Central Asian Style
- Classification: Cultural heritage site
- Location: Kokbulok mahalla, Kamashi district, Kashkadarya region, 45, Zargarlar Street, Itchan Kala, Khiva, Uzbekistan
- Coordinates: 41°22′47″N 60°21′41″E
- Year built: 1870
- Owner: Amir Tora

Technical details
- Material: Baked bricks
- Floor count: 2 floors

Amir Tora madrasah is a cultural heritage object located in the historical center of Khiva region in Uzbekistan. It was taken under state protection as an architectural monument. It is located in the northern part of the Itchan Kala.

== History ==
=== Construction history ===
Amir Tora madrasah was built in the capital of Khiva Khanate, inside the Itchan Kala, near the northern Bogcha gate of the city, in front of Hasan Murad Qushbegi mosque under the donation of Amir Tora, the brother of the Uzbek ruler Muhammad Rahimkhan II (1864-1910). Some sources give 1870 as the year of construction, while others give 1872.

It is said that since the construction of Amir Tora Madrasah coincided with the construction of Muhammad Rahim Khan Madrasah, Amir Tora suffered a little from the lack of bricks and skilled craftsmen. Later, he easily solved this problem and brought the masters of To'rtko'l and Shorokhan under his care.

The interior of the madrasah is covered with tiles, and the facade is left undecorated with tiles. One of the reasons for this is the Khiva campaign of the Russian Empire in 1873.

=== The period after Uzbekistan gained independence ===
In 2014, it is planned to repair the Amir Tora madrasah with the donation of UNESCO.

During 2017–2019, restoration works were carried out in 2 stages at the Amir Tora madrasah. On January 9, 2020, it was reported that the Amir Tora madrasa was repaired by the Chinese academy of cultural heritage at the expense of investment funds. Three months later, on March 12, the President of Uzbekistan Shavkat Mirziyoyev, who visited the Itchan Kala complex, got acquainted with the restoration work carried out at the Amir Tora madrasah.

It was planned to give the building of the madrasah to the Khiva restoration school on the basis of the right of free use and to create conditions for the demonstration of exemplary preservation works, practical exhibitions, creation of new expositions, and direct observation of preservation works by tourists. It was reported that the activity of the Khiva restoration school has been launched, and a training system has been created for restorers-masters and other specialists in the field of immovable property objects of material cultural heritage.

== Architecture ==
There are three pairs of rooms with double arches on both sides of the hall (52.6x36.7 meters), with a majestic gable. The bouquets in the four corners are decorated in a wave style with a rivet belt. The mosque and the classroom have the same structure. The porch in the south of the mosque has a dome roof, the arches under the dome are six-sided, and three rows of muqarnas are made on it.

On both sides of the yard (30.7x19.35 meters) there are one-story transverse rooms with arched fronts. The rooms in the corners of the courtyard are entered from the corridor. The rooms are vaulted, and the windows have bars. There are classrooms on both sides of the three-domed mion palace. The Amir Tora Madrasah was renovated in 1970, and a shopping stall was placed in front of the main building.
