= ʻOkina =

Letter of the Latin alphabet

The ʻokina (Hawaiian pronunciation: [ʔoˈkinɐ]) is the letter that transcribes the glottal stop consonant in Hawaiian. It does not have distinct uppercase and lowercase forms, and is represented electronically by the modifier letter turned comma: ʻ.

A phonemic glottal stop exists in many other Polynesian languages as well; these are usually written by a similar apostrophe-like letter.

== Names ==
Following are the names of the glottal stop consonant in various Polynesian languages, and notes on how they are represented in text.

Language	Vernacular name	Literal meaning	Notes
Hawaiian	ʻokina	Separator; cutting; breaking	The ʻokina is often replaced in computer publications by the grave accent (`), the left single quotation mark (‘), or the apostrophe ('), especially when the correct typographical mark (ʻ) is not available.
Samoan	koma liliu	"Inverted comma"—inverted (liliu) comma (koma)	Often replaced by an apostrophe in modern publications, recognized by Samoan scholars and the wider community. Use of the apostrophe and macron diacritics in Samoan words was readopted by the Ministry of Education in 2012 after having been abandoned in the 1960s.
Tahitian	ʻeta	ʻetaʻeta = to harden	
Tongan	fakauʻa (honorific for fakamonga)	Throat maker	Typeset by the same character (ʻ) as the ʻokina.
Rapa Nui	ꞌeꞌe		In electronic texts tends to be written with a (always lower-case) saltillo ⟨ꞌ⟩.
Cook Islands Māori	ʻamata or ʻakairo ʻamata	"hamza" or "hamza mark"	Not commonly used in daily writing. The 2014 Revised New Testament Bible models the use of the Saltillo character to mark the glottal stop. The ʻokina is also used in some contemporary writing.
Wallisian	fakamoga	By throat	Not used in daily writing. Various graphic forms are used.

== Appearance ==
The phrase ʻŌlelo Hawaiʻi, meaning "Hawaiian language", set in Gentium Book typeface. In the second line, the character-variant option for large apostrophe-like letters is set.

In many typefaces, the symbol for the ʻokina looks identical to the symbol for the curved single opening quotation mark. In others (like Linux Libertine) it is a slightly different size, either larger or smaller, as seen in the adjacent image.

The phrase illustrated is surrounded by single opening and closing quotation marks. There is one ʻokina before the Ō and another one before the last i. These are slightly smaller than the quotation marks in the first line and slightly larger in the second.

== Case ==
The ʻokina is treated as a separate letter in the Hawaiian alphabet. It is unicameral—that is, it does not have separate uppercase (capital or majuscule) and lowercase (small or minuscule) forms—unlike the other letters, all of which are basic Latin letters. It is used only before vowels: ʻa, ʻe, ʻi, ʻo, ʻu. For words that begin with an ʻokina, capitalization rules affect the vowel: for instance, at the beginning of a sentence, the name of the letter is written "ʻOkina", with a capital O.

== Geographic names in the United States ==
The United States Board on Geographic Names lists relevant place names both with and without the ʻokina and kahakō (macron) in the Geographic Names Information System. Colloquially and formally, the forms have long been used interchangeably.

== Computer encoding ==
=== Apostrophes and quotation marks ===
In the (limited) ASCII character set, the ʻokina was typically represented by the apostrophe character ('), conventionally a straight typewriter apostrophe, thus lacking the curve of the ʻokina proper. In some computer fonts, the ASCII apostrophe is rendered as a right single quotation mark, which is an even less satisfactory glyph for the ʻokina—essentially a 180° rotation of the correct shape.

Many subsequent "extended ASCII" character sets expanded on the overloaded ASCII apostrophe, providing distinct characters for the left and right single quotation marks. The left single quotation mark has been used as an acceptable approximation to the ʻokina, though it still has problems: the ʻokina is a letter, not a punctuation mark, which may cause incorrect behaviour in automated text processing. Additionally, the left single quotation mark is represented in some typefaces by a glyph shaped like a mirrored miniature 9 (rather than like a 6), and thus unsuitable for the ʻokina.

=== Unicode ===
ʻ

In the Unicode standard, the preferred character for the ʻokina is U+02BB ʻ MODIFIER LETTER TURNED COMMA (ʻ).

== See also ==
- Ayin, pronounced as a glottal stop in some languages
- Glottal stop (letter) – Letter of the Latin alphabet
- Hamza – Mark used in Arabic-based orthographies
- Modifier letter apostrophe – Phonetic modifier letter (ʼ)
- Representative glyph – Non-specific archetype to represent a grapheme
- Saltillo (linguistics) – Consonant in Mexican linguistics
- Two dots (diacritic) – Diacritic that consists of two dots placed over a letter, which has a Unicode codepoint U+0308 ◌̈ COMBINING DIAERESIS that is also used for the umlaut (diacritic)
