= Unicase =

Alphabet without separate cases

A unicase, or unicameral, script is a writing script that has no separate cases for its letters. Semitic abjads such as Hebrew and Arabic, Brahmic scripts such as Devanagari, Tamil and Thai, CJK scripts (Chinese characters, Hangul and Kana) and the Iberian and Georgian scripts are unicase writing systems, while scripts like Latin, Greek, Cyrillic and Armenian are bicameral, as they have two cases for each letter, e.g. B and b, Б and б, Β and β, or Բ and բ. Individual characters can also be called unicameral if they are used as letters with a generally bicameral alphabet but have only one form for both cases; for example, the ʻokina as used in Polynesian languages and the glottal stop as used in Nuu-chah-nulth are unicameral. Occasionally, typefaces of cased scripts make use of unicase letter forms to achieve certain aesthetic effects; this was particularly popular in the 1960s.

Most modern writing systems originated as unicase orthographies. The Latin script originally had only majuscule forms directly derived from the Greek alphabet, which were originally viable for being chiseled into stone. At the same time, everyday writing was carried out in a cursive variant of the block capitals, which during the Middle Ages evolved into new letterforms for use in running text that were more legible and faster to write with an ink pen, such as Carolingian minuscule. Originally, use of the two forms was mutually exclusive, but it became a common compromise to use both in tandem, which ultimately had additional benefits in areas such as legibility. The later minuscule became the "lowercase" forms, while the original majuscule became the "uppercase" forms.

Modern Latin unicameral orthographies include the Saanich alphabet in Canada, which uses majuscule letter forms save for a single suffix, and the alphabet of the constructed palawa kani language of Tasmania, which uses only minuscule letterforms. Another example of a recent unicase Latin alphabet is the Initial Teaching Alphabet, though capitals may be indicated by enlarging a letter. The International Phonetic Alphabet is similarly unicameral, but when it is used for normal orthography capital letters are added. Several conlangs have unicameral orthographies, such as the Latin Klingon alphabet, which has both capital and lowercase letters but with contrasting values.

== Web typography ==
"Unicase" has been specified as a display variant in the CSS standard. For example, one can use the font-variant: unicase property to render text as unicase in supported browsers. The underlying OpenType specification is the unic tag. Any given letter can be displayed as upper-case or lower-case according to the font design, unlike an all-caps display or use of small-caps for lower-case, but the same character is always displayed in that same case. On your system, this appears like so: The Quick Brown Fox Jumps Over The Lazy Dog. The preceding sentence may or may not render in a distinctive way, depending on your browser. For instance, it may appear like this image:

Since only the presentation of the text is styled, no actual case transformation is applied and readers are still able to copy the original plain text from the webpage.

== See also ==
- Alphabet 26
