= Uzbek alphabet =

Scripts used to write the Uzbek language

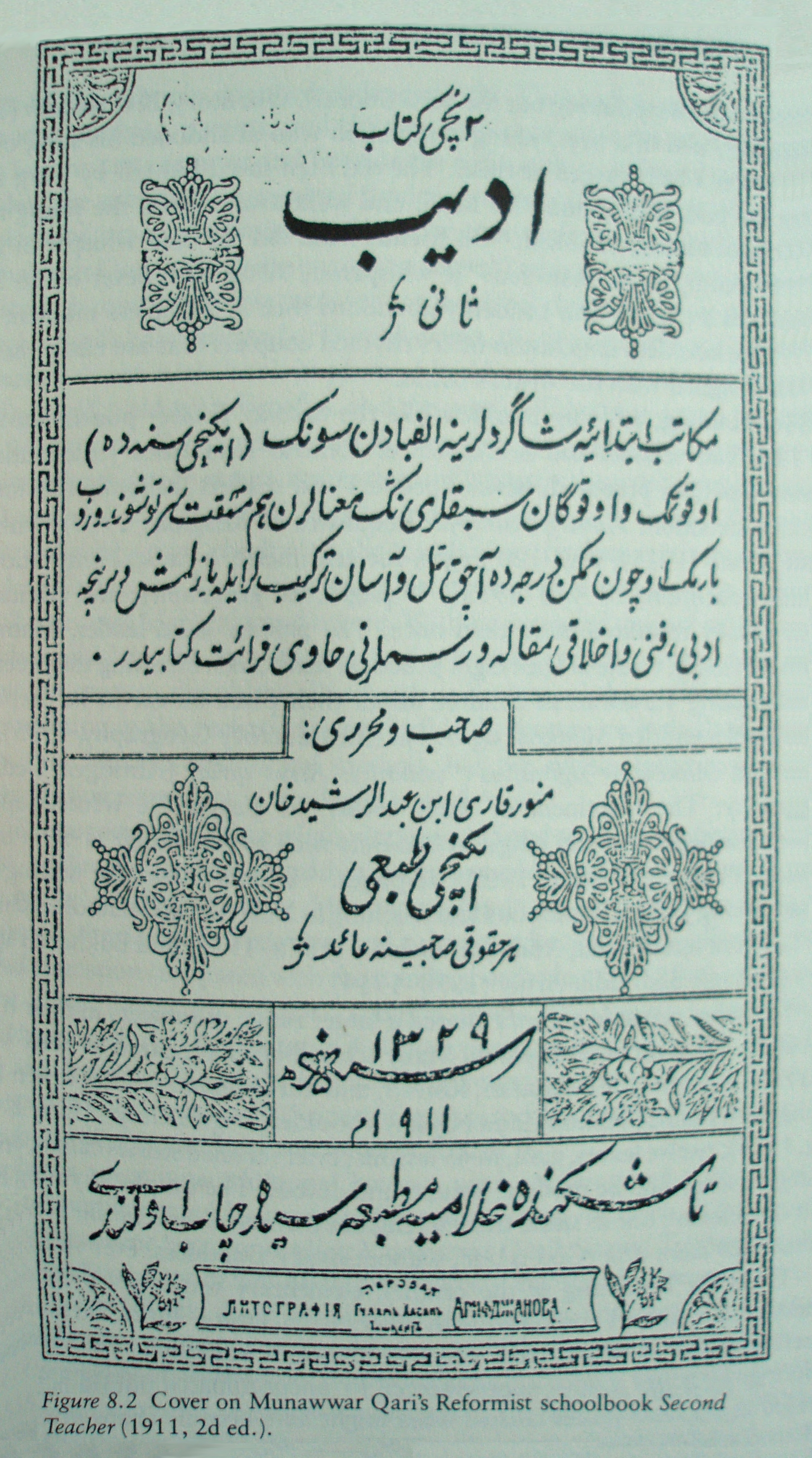
A page from an Uzbek book printed in Arabic script. Tashkent, 1911.

The Uzbek language has been written in various scripts: Latin, Cyrillic and Arabic. The language traditionally used Arabic script, but the official Uzbek government under the Soviet Union started to use Cyrillic in 1940, which is when widespread literacy campaigns were initiated by the Soviet government across the Union. In 1993, Latin script was officially reintroduced in Uzbekistan along with Cyrillic. In the Xinjiang region of China, some Uzbek speakers write using Cyrillic, others with an alphabet based on the Uyghur Arabic alphabet. Uzbeks of Afghanistan also write the language using Arabic script, and the Arabic Uzbek alphabet is taught at some schools.

== History ==
=== Arabic script ===
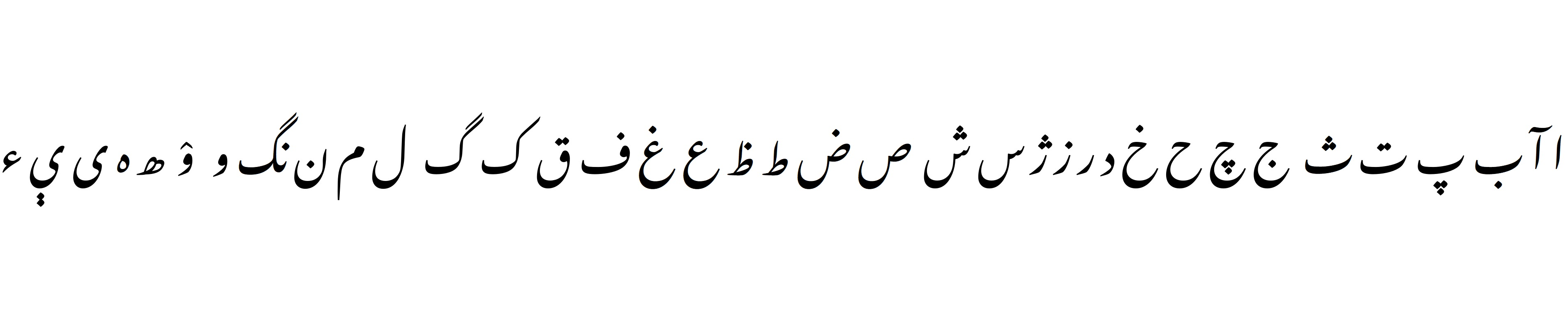
The Uzbek alphabet written in a variant of the Perso-Arabic script in the Nastaliq style.

Like all Turkic languages in Central Asia and its literary predecessor Chagatai, Uzbek was written in various forms of the Arabic script historically. Following the Russian revolution and Soviet takeover of Russian Turkestan, in January 1921, a reformed Arabic orthography designed by the Jadidists was adopted, which replaced the harakat marks used for short vowels with a fully alphabetic system that indicated every vowel and removed all letters that occurred only in Arabic loanwords and did not have a distinct phonetic value. It had six vowels and twenty-three consonants. Notably, unlike the Cyrillic and Latin alphabets that followed, it did not contain a letter to represent /f/, due to the argument that it was always assimilated to /p/ in the orthophony. Some had also proposed that there be no letter to represent /h/, due to many dialects assimilating it to /x/, but this was not implemented in the end.

The Arabic script is still used for writing Uzbek in Afghanistan and by Afghan-Uzbek diaspora elsewhere. In the early 21st century, with the publication of dictionaries and literature by Afghan-Uzbek scholars, as well as the adaptation of Uzbek Arabic script by domestic as well as international news outlets (like BBC News Uzbek Afghanistan and TRT Afghani Uzbek), the Arabic script has undergone a process of documentation and standardization.

ا	ب	پ	ت	ث	ج	چ	ح	خ
د	ذ	ر	ز	ژ	س	ش	ص	ض
ط	ظ	ع	غ	ف	ق	ک	گ	ل
م	ن	و	ه	ى

=== Latin script ===
The question of the transition of the Uzbek language to the Latin alphabet was raised back in 1920. In January 1921, it was discussed at the regional congress in Tashkent, but then supporters of romanization did not receive approval from numerous adherents of reforming the Arabic script. This issue was raised for the second time in 1926 at the First Turkic Congress in Baku. At this congress, the transition of all Turkic languages of the peoples of the USSR to the new Latin alphabet, Yañalif was approved. To implement the transition to the Latin alphabet, the New Alphabet Committee was created under the Presidium of the Central Executive Committee of the Soviets of the Uzbek SSR. Various projects for the new alphabet were widely discussed on the pages of the press, various meetings, meetings, and conferences. Significant discussion flared up on the issue of displaying synharmonism in writing. It was decided to display synharmonism in writing, for which 9 letters were introduced into the alphabet to display vowels.

In 1929, as part of comprehensive programs to promote literacy within Uzbek people, who for the first time now had their own cartographically delineated (administrative) region, Uzbek writing in the Uzbek SSR was switched to Latin script. The latinization of Uzbek was carried out in the context of latinization of all languages in the Soviet Union. The new Latin script also brought about the letter ⟨f⟩ to represent /f/ and distinction of back and front vowels, adding a number of new characters for them.

At the Republican Spelling Conference in Samarkand, held in May 1929, a new Uzbek alphabet of 34 characters was approved:

A a	B ʙ	C c	Ç ç	D d	E e	Ə ə	F f
G g	Ƣ ƣ	H h	I i	J j	K k	L l	M m
N n	Ꞑ ꞑ	O o	Ө ө	P p	Q q	R r	S s
Ş ş	T t	U u	V v	X x	Y y	Z z	Ƶ ƶ
Ь ь	'

In 1934, the script underwent another reform, which reverted the addition of back-front vowel distinctions. The letters Ө ө, Y y, Ь ь were removed from the alphabet, while the letter Ə ə had its usage reduced, being primarily replaced by A a. This reform simplified Uzbek spelling, but did not solve all its problems. In this regard, in 1937, a team of scientists under the leadership of A.K. Borovkov began to develop a new version of the Uzbek alphabet and spelling. The alphabet compiled by this team had the following order: A a, B b, V v, G g, D d, E e, Ƶ ƶ, Z z, I i, J j, K k, L l, M m, N n, Å å, O o, P p, R r, S s, T t, U u, F f, X x, C c, Ş ş, Ç ç, Q q, Ƣ ƣ, H h, Ꞑ ꞑ. However, at this time the Cyrillization process was already gaining momentum in the USSR, which made the reform of the Latinized alphabet irrelevant.

=== Cyrillic script ===
In 1939, a commission was created at the Collegium of the People's Commissariat of Education of the Uzbek SSR to develop the Uzbek alphabet based on the Cyrillic alphabet. This commission developed an alphabet that included all 33 letters of the Russian alphabet, as well as six additional characters Ң ң, Ҷ ҷ, Ө ө, Қ қ, Ƶ ƶ, Ҳ ҳ and an apostrophe. However, this project was heavily criticized by linguists and educators for its cumbersomeness and the presence of extra letters. Most critics proposed eliminating the letters Щ щ and Ы ы from the alphabet. Some considered it necessary to also exclude the letters Е е, Ё ё, Ц ц, Ю ю, Я я. It was proposed to take the letter A a for the sound [ɔ], and to use Ə ə for [ä]. In addition to the main project of the Uzbek Cyrillic alphabet, a number of others were proposed:

Yañalif	Main project	Project I	Project II	Project III	Project IV	Project V
ç	ҷ	җ	чʼ	дж	ç	дж
q	қ	ʀ	кʼ	къ	q	к
ƣ	ғ	v	гʼ	гъ	ƣ	г
h	һ	ҳ	хʼ	хъ	h	х
ꞑ	ң	ң	нг	нг	ꞑ	нг
ө	ө	ө	уʼ	ў	ө	ү
o	о	о		ў	о	у
a	о	ā	о	о	а	о
ə	а	а	а	а	ə	а
ts	ц	ц	ц	ц	тс	ц
ş, şc, c	щ	шч/щ	щ	щ	шч/ш	щ
je	е	йе/е	е	е	йе/е	е
ja	ё	йо/о	ё	ё	йо/о	ё
i	ы	и	ы	ы	и	ы
ju, jy, u, y	ю	ю	ю	ю	йу/у	ю
jə	я	я	я	я	йа/а	я
е	э	е	э	э	е	э
ʼ	ъ	ʼ	ъ	ъ	ʼ	ъ
ʼ	ь	ʼ	ь	ь		ь

In 1940, Uzbek was switched to the Cyrillic script under Joseph Stalin:

А а	Б б	В в	Г г	Д д	Е е	Ё ё	Ж ж	З з
И и	Й й	К к	Л л	М м	Н н	О о	П п	Р р
С с	Т т	У у	Ф ф	Х х	Ц ц	Ч ч	Ш ш	Ъ ъ
Ь ь	Э э	Ю ю	Я я	Ў ў	Қ қ	Ғ ғ	Ҳ ҳ

The Uzbek Cyrillic alphabet contains all the letters of the Russian alphabet, apart from Щ and Ы, plus four extra ones, namely Ў, Қ, Ғ and Ҳ. These four letters are considered as separate letters and not letter variants. They come in alphabetical order after the letter Я.

The letters Ц and Ь are not used in Uzbek native words, but are included in the alphabet for writing loanwords, e. g. кальций (calcium). However, Щ and Ы are not included, so they are replaced by ШЧ and И in loanwords and names from Russian, e. g. the Russian surnames Щедрин (Shchedrin) and Быков (Bykov) are rendered Шчедрин and Биков in Uzbek Cyrillic.

Despite further reforms, this alphabet is still in use both in Uzbekistan and neighboring countries (Tajikistan, Kyrgyzstan and Kazakhstan).

=== Modern Latin alphabet ===
A a	B b	D d	E e	F f	G g	Ğ ğ	H h	I i	J j
K k	L l	M m	N n	O o	Ö ö	P p	Q q	R r	S s
Ş ş	Ç ç	T t	U u	V v	X x	Y y	Z z	ʼ

Until 1993, Uzbek in the USSR and after its dissolution continued to be written using a Cyrillic alphabet. Following the independence of Uzbekistan, the Latin script was officially reintroduced for Uzbek. In 1993, the government adopted an initial Latin-based alphabet containing several letters with diacritics, including ⟨Ç ç⟩, ⟨Ğ ğ⟩, ⟨Ɉ ɉ⟩, ⟨Ñ ñ⟩, ⟨Ö ö⟩ and ⟨Ş ş⟩. This alphabet was revised in 1995 into the alphabet that remained the official standard for Uzbek for the following three decades.

The 1995 alphabet retained the basic Latin letters but represented several Uzbek sounds using letter combinations or letters followed by an apostrophe. It contains 26 letters and three letter combinations: ⟨Sh sh⟩, ⟨Ch ch⟩ and ⟨Ng ng⟩, while ⟨Oʻ oʻ⟩ and ⟨Gʻ gʻ⟩ are represented using an apostrophe-like sign. The system was subsequently adopted for education, official documentation and public signage, although the Cyrillic script remained widespread, particularly among older generations.

The transition to the Latin script was gradual. In 2001, the Latin script began to appear on coins, and during the 2000s increasing numbers of government websites, signs and other public materials adopted it. The government repeatedly extended deadlines for the complete transition from Cyrillic to Latin. In February 2021, the government announced plans to complete the transition of official documentation by 1 January 2023, although Cyrillic continued to be used alongside Latin in many areas.

In 2018, the government began considering a further reform of the Latin alphabet, primarily intended to replace digraphs and apostrophe-based letters with single characters. A series of proposals followed. A proposal published for public discussion in March 2021 called for replacing ⟨Ch ch⟩, ⟨Sh sh⟩, ⟨Gʻ gʻ⟩ and ⟨Oʻ oʻ⟩ with ⟨Ç ç⟩, ⟨Ş ş⟩, ⟨Ğ ğ⟩ and ⟨Ŏ ŏ⟩ respectively. Further revisions were discussed in 2021 and 2023, but none of these proposals entered into force.

In July 2026, the Legislative Chamber of the Oliy Majlis approved a bill to amend the law governing the Latin-based Uzbek alphabet and sent it to the Senate. The reform was developed with the participation of linguists from the Institute of Uzbek Language, Literature and Folklore of the Academy of Sciences of Uzbekistan. The revised alphabet replaces the existing system of 26 letters and three letter combinations with an alphabet consisting of 28 letters and one apostrophe. The changes replace ⟨Oʻ oʻ⟩ with ⟨Ö ö⟩, ⟨Gʻ gʻ⟩ with ⟨Ğ ğ⟩, ⟨Sh sh⟩ with ⟨Ş ş⟩ and ⟨Ch ch⟩ with ⟨Ç ç⟩. The ⟨Ng ng⟩ combination is removed as a separate unit of the alphabet.

The Senate approved the amendments on 10 September 2026. The new alphabet is intended to simplify the writing and digital processing of Uzbek by replacing multi-character combinations with individual letters. The reform also provides for a gradual transition in order to avoid the immediate replacement of existing documents, signs and other materials. Documents, national currency and securities issued under the previous alphabet retain their validity during the transition period.

The alphabet was approved by President Shavkat Mirziyoyev on 21 October 2026 and will come into force on 22 April 2027.

Alphabet reform projects between 1993 and 2026
Sound	1995 orthography	1993	November 2018	May 2019	March 2021	November 2021	September 2023	July 2026
/o/	Oʻ oʻ	Ö ö	Ŏ ŏ	Ó ó	Ō ō	Õ õ		Ö ö
/ʁ/	Gʻ gʻ	Ğ ğ		Ǵ ǵ	Ḡ ḡ	Ğ ğ		
/ʃ/	Sh sh	Ş ş						
/t͡ʃ/	Ch ch	Ç ç						
/ŋ/	Ng ng	Ñ ñ	Ng ng			Ñ ñ	Ng ng	
/ʒ/	J j	Ɉ ɉ	J j					
/t͡s/	Ts ts	C c	Ts ts	C c	Ts ts			

== Alphabetical order ==
The 2026 Uzbek Latin alphabet (which will come into force in 2027) has 28 letters:

Uzbek alphabet
1	2	3	4	5	6	7	8	9	10	11	12	13	14	15	16	17	18	19	20	21	22	23	24	25	26	27	28
Majuscule forms (also called uppercase or capital letters)
A	B	D	E	F	G	Ğ	H	I	J	K	L	M	N	O	Ö	P	Q	R	S	Ş	Ç	T	U	V	X	Y	Z
Minuscule forms (also called lowercase or small letters)
a	b	d	e	f	g	ğ	h	i	j	k	l	m	n	o	ö	p	q	r	s	ş	ç	t	u	v	x	y	z

The symbol ⟨ʼ⟩ does not constitute a separate letter.

== Correspondence chart ==
Below is a table of Uzbek Cyrillic and Latin alphabets with represented sounds. Note that in Arabic script, vowel-initial words begin with a silent ا (traditional alphabet; may be replaced with an etymological ع in loans) or with a silent ئ (Yangi Imlo alphabet).

Latin							Cyrillic equivalent	Arabic		IPA	English approximation
2026 (in force after 2027)	1995–2026	1993–1995	Yañalif (1934–1940)	Yañalif (1929–1934)	Name (2026)	Name (pre-2026)	Cyrillic equivalent	Yangi Imlo (1923–1928)	Traditional	IPA	English approximation
A a	A a			A a [ɑ]	a		А а	عە ,ئە and عا ,ئا	(final ه)	/æ/~/ɑ/	chai, cat
A a	A a			Ə ə [æ]	a		А а	عە ,ئە and عا ,ئا	(final ه)	/æ/~/ɑ/	chai, cat
B b	B b		B ʙ		be		Б б	ب	ب	/b/	bat
D d	D d				de		Д д	د	د	/d̪/	den
E e	E e				e		Э э / Е е	ې	ې	/e/ (Note: Cyrillic "Е е" at the beginning of a word and after a vowel is "Ye ye" in Latin.)	bet
F f	F f				fe	ef	Ф ф	ف	ف	/ɸ/	fish
G g	G g				ge		Г г	گ	گ	/ɡ/	go
Ğ ğ	Gʻ gʻ	Ğ ğ	Ƣ ƣ		ğe	gʻa	Ғ ғ	غ	غ	/ʁ/	like a French or German "r"
H h	H h				he		Ҳ ҳ	ھ and ح	ھ and ح	/h/	house
I i	I i			I i [i]	i		И и	ئ ,ى and ي	ی	/i/	me
I i	I i			Ь ь [ɨ]	i		И и	ئ ,ى and ي	ی	/i/	me
J j	J j	J j	Ç ç		je		Ж ж	ج	ج	/dʒ/	joke
J j	J j	Ɉ ɉ	Ƶ ƶ		je		Ж ж	ژ	ژ	/ʒ/ (Note: In some words before consonants (e. g. ajdod [æʒˈdɔd] "ancestor") and in Russian borrowings.)	vision
K k	K k				ke	ka	К к	ك	ک	/k/	cold
L l	L l				le	el	Л л	ل	ل	/l/	list
M m	M m				me	em	М м	م	م	/m/	man
N n	N n				ne	en	Н н	ن	ن	/n/	next
O o	O o		A a		o		О о	ئا	ا (initial آ)	/ɔ/	hot, call (Received Pronunciation)
Ö ö	Oʻ oʻ	Ö ö	O o	O o [o]	ö	oʻ	Ў ў	و	ۉ	/o/	row
Ö ö	Oʻ oʻ	Ö ö	O o	Ө ө [ɵ]	ö	oʻ	Ў ў	و	ۉ	/o/	row
P p	P p				pe		П п	پ	پ	/p/	pin
Q q	Q q				qe	qa	Қ қ	ق	ق	/q/, /χ/ (Note: In some words written with the letter "q", the sound has now changed to /χ/, such as öquvçi [oˈχuv.tʃi] "pupil" and haqiqiy [hæχiˈχiː] "real". There is no regular sound change law regarding when this process occurs.)	like a "k", but further back in the throat
R r	R r				re		Р р	ر	ر	/r/	(trilled) rat
S s	S s	S s	S s		se	es	С с	س	ث and س and ص	/s/	sick
S s	S s	C c	S s		se	es	Ц ц	س	ث and س and ص	/ts/ (Note: In Russian borrowings; Cyrillic "Ц ц" is rendered in Latin script as "Ts ts" after a vowel, otherwise as "S s".)	cats
Ş ş	Sh sh	Ş ş			şe	she	Ш ш	ش	ش	/ʃ/	shoe
Ç ç	Ch ch	Ç ç	C c		çe	che	Ч ч	چ	چ	/tʃ/	chew
T t	T t				te		Т т	ت	ت and ط	/t̪/	toe
U u	U u			U u [u]	u		У у	ۇ	و	/u/	put, choose
U u	U u			Y y [ʉ]	u		У у	ۇ	و	/u/	put, choose
V v	V v				ve		В в	ۋ	ۋ	/v/~/w/	van
X x	X x				xe	xa	Х х	خ	خ	/χ/	"ch" as in German "Bach" or Scottish "loch"
Y y	Y y		J j		ye		Й й	ي	ی	/j/	yes
Z z	Z z				ze		З з	ز	ذ and ز and ض and ظ	/z/	zebra
ʼ	ʼ				tutuq belgisi		ъ	ع	ء / أ / ؤ / ئ and ع	/ʔ/	Both ⟨ʼ⟩ (tutuq belgisi) and ⟨ъ⟩ (ayiriş belgisi) are used either (1) to mark the phonetic glottal stop when put immediately before a vowel or (2) to mark a long vowel when placed immediately after a vowel (Note: Tutuq belgisi (ʼ) was also used in the 1995–2026 orthography to indicate that the letters "s" and "h" should be pronounced separately, not as the digraph "sh" in Latin. For example, in the name Isʼhoq (Исҳоқ) "s" and "h" are pronounced separately.)

The 1993–1995 orthography also included the letter ñ corresponding to the phoneme /ŋ/. The 1995 reform replaced ñ with the digraph ng, which was considered to be a separate letter of the alphabet. In the 2026 orthography, this digraph is regarded as a sequence of the letters N and G.

The sign ⟨ʼ⟩ (tutuq belgisi) was not used in the 1995–2026 Uzbek Latin-based orthography after the letter oʻ: moʻjiza, moʻtabar, moʻtadil (Cyrillic spellings мўъжиза, мўътабар, мўътадил).

The Cyrillic letters Ё ё, Ю ю, Я я correspond to the Latin sequences yo, yu, ya.

The Cyrillic letters Ц ц and ь (capital Ь occurs only in all-capitals writing), called (t)se and yumşatiş belgisi respectively, are used only in loanwords. In the modern Uzbek Latin alphabet ц becomes ts after vowels, s otherwise; ь is omitted (except ье, ьи, ьо, that become ye, yi, yo).

The letters c and w, not considered distinct letters of the Uzbek alphabet, are named (t)se and dubl-ve respectively. In mathematics, x, y, z are named iks, igrek, zet.

=== Distinct characters ===
A Nowruz sign in front of the State Art Museum of Uzbekistan written using an ʻokina-like symbol

When the Uzbek language is written using the 1995–2026 Latin orthography, the letters Oʻ (Cyrillic Ў) and Gʻ (Cyrillic Ғ) are properly rendered using the character U+02BB ʻ MODIFIER LETTER TURNED COMMA, which is also known as the ʻokina. However, since this character is absent from most keyboard layouts (except for the Hawaiian keyboard in Windows 8, or above, computers) and many fonts, most Uzbek websites – including some operated by the Uzbek government – use either U+2018 ‘ LEFT SINGLE QUOTATION MARK or U+0027 ' APOSTROPHE to represent these letters.

The character U+02BC ʼ MODIFIER LETTER APOSTROPHE (tutuq belgisi) is used to mark the phonetic glottal stop when it is put immediately before a vowel in borrowed words, as in sanʼat (art). The modifier letter apostrophe is also used to mark a long vowel when placed immediately after a vowel, as in maʼno (meaning). Since this character is also absent from most keyboard layouts, many Uzbek websites use U+2019 ’ RIGHT SINGLE QUOTATION MARK or U+0027 ' APOSTROPHE instead.

Currently most typists do not bother with the differentiation between the modifier letter turned comma and modifier letter apostrophe as their keyboard layouts likely accommodate only the straight apostrophe.

== Sample of the scripts ==
Article 1 of the Universal Declaration of Human Rights:

Uzbek Arabic	بَرْچَه آدَم‌لَر اېرْکِین، قَدْر‌قِیمَّت وَ حُقُوق‌لَرْدَه تېنْگ بۉلِیب تُوغِیلَه‌دِیلَر. اُولَر عَقْل وَ وِجْدان صاحِبِی‌دِیرْلَر وَ بَیر‌بَیرْلَرِی اِیلَه بِرادَرلَرچَه مُعامَلَه قِیلِیش‌لَرِی ضَرُور.
Uzbek Latin	Barça odamlar erkin, qadr-qimmat va huquqlarda teng bölib tuğiladilar. Ular aql va vijdon sohibidirlar va bir-birlari ila birodarlarça muomala qilişlari zarur.
Uzbek Cyrillic	Барча одамлар эркин, қадр-қиммат ва ҳуқуқларда тенг бўлиб туғиладилар. Улар ақл ва виждон соҳибидирлар ва бир-бирлари ила биродарларча муомала қилишлари зарур.
IPA	[bæ̞ɾˈt͡ʃʰæ̞ ɒd̪æ̞mˈlæ̞ɾ eɾˈkʰɪ̞n qäˈd̪ɨ̞ɾ qɨ̞mˈmät̪ ʋæ̞ hŭquqläɾˈd̪æ̞ t̪ʰeŋ bɵˈlɪ̞p t̪ʰuʁɨ̞läd̪ɪ̞ˈlæ̞ɾ ‖ uˈlæ̞ɾ äˈqɨ̞l ʋæ̞ ʋɪ̞d͡ʒˈd̪ɒn sɒhɪ̞bɪ̞dɪ̞ɾˈlæ̞ɾ ʋæ̞ bɪ̞ɾ bɪ̞ɾlæ̞ˈɾɪ̞ iˈlæ̞ bɪ̞ɾɒdæ̞ɾlæ̞ɾˈt͡ʃʰæ̞ muɒmæ̞ˈlæ̞ qɨ̞lɨ̞ʃlæ̞ˈɾɪ̞ zæ̞ˈɾuɾ ‖]
English original	All human beings are born free and equal in dignity and rights. They are endowed with reason and conscience and should act towards one another in a spirit of brotherhood.
