= Has Hlai grammar =

Grammar of the Has Hlai language

This article is a description of the grammar of standardized Has Hlai, a Hlai language spoken on the island of Hainan, China, by the Hlai (Li) ethnic group. The parts of speech are nouns, verbs, adjectives, conjunctions, numerals, adverbs, and pronouns.

== Introduction ==
The Hlai people (or, as they are called in Chinese, the Li – 黎族) are the original inhabitants of southern Hainan. A Kra–Dai people, they are believed to have settled there at least 2,000 to 6,000 years ago, and carry genetic markers from ancient people who reached the island between 7,000 and 27,000 years ago. The Pre-Hlai language they spoke would later evolve into Proto-Hlai, and from there into the modern Hlai languages.

In June 1956, China's government implemented research on Hainan Island of the Hlai people's language.

A 1983 report, Liyu diaocha yanjiu (黎语调查研究), claimed that the Hlai language is made up of five languages: Has 侾黎, Gheis 杞黎, Hyuuen 本地黎, Moeifou 美孚黎, and Deitou 加茂黎. For education, the Lauxhuet dialect of Has (Chinese: 侾方言罗活土语) in Ledong Baoyou Baoding (Chinese: 乐东抱由镇保定村) was chosen to be the Li's standardized language. It was this language from which the "Li orthography" (Chinese: 黎文方案) was developed.

In September 1984, two organizations, Central University for Nationalities and the Institute of Minorities in Chinese Academy of Social Sciences, made some revisions to the Li orthography. The Hlai language's orthography was finalized with the publishing of a textbook entitled Basic Li Course (Pinyin: Liyu Jichu Jiaocheng; Chinese: 黎语基础教程).

At the end of 2019, a Hlai-language dictionary was officially posted online (http://www.tunhlai.com).

== Phonology and orthography ==
=== Consonants ===
Has Hlai has 31 consonants. /ȶ/ is only found as a coda.

(Still under work)		Labial	Alveolar		Alveolo- palatal	Velar		Glottal		
(Still under work)		Labial	plain	sibilant	Alveolo- palatal	Plain	Lab.	Plain	Lab.	Pal.
Nasal		m [m]	n [n]		ny [ȵ]	ng [ŋ]	ngw [ŋʷ]			
Plosive/ Affricate	aspirated	p [pʰ]	t [tʰ]	c, q [tsʰ]		k [kʰ]	kw [kʷʰ]	(ʔ)		
Plosive/ Affricate	unvoiced	b [p]	d [t]	z, j [ts]	ty [ȶ]	g [k]	gw [kʷ]			
Plosive/ Affricate	voiced					gh [ɡ]	ghw [ɡʷ]			
Plosive/ Affricate	implosive	bh [ɓ]	dh [ɗ]							
Plosive/ Affricate	lateral	bl [pˡ]								
Fricative	voiceless	f [f]	hl [ɬ]					h [h]	hw [hʷ]	hy [hʲ]
Fricative	voiced	v [v]		dz [z]						
Approximant		w [ˀw]	l [l]		y [ˀj]					
Trill			r [r]							

Notes:

1. /ʔ/ is a null initial
2. /ʔw/ and /ʔj/ are glottalized
3. The velar stops are allophonic in Has Hlai with fricative forms (/k/ > /x/, etc.)
4. /f/, /v/ are labiodental; /m/, /b/, /p/, /pʰ/, and /pl/ are bilabial

=== Vowel rimes ===
		Nucleus											
		a [a]		e [e]		i [i]		o [o]		u [u]		uu [ɯ]	
		Short	Long	Short	Long	Short	Long	Short	Long	Short	Long	Short	Long
Coda	-a					ia [ia]				ua [ua]		uua [ɯa]	
Coda	-i	ai [ai]	aei [aːi]	ei [ɵi]					oei [oːi]	ui [ui]	uei [uːi]		uuei [ɯːi]
Coda	-u	au [au]	aeu [aːu]		eeu [eːu]	iu [iu]	ieu [iːu]	ou [ou]					
Coda	-ɯ	auu [aɯ]		euu [eɯ]									
Coda	-m	am [am]	aem [aːm]	em [em]	eem [eːm]	im [im]	iem [iːm]	om [om]	oem [oːm]			uum [ɯm]	uuem [ɯːm]
Coda	-n	an [an]	aen [aːn]	en [en]	een [eːn]	in [in]	ien [iːn]		oen [oːn]	un [un]	uen [uːn]	uun [ɯn]	uuen [ɯːn]
Coda	-ȵ	any [aȵ]	aeny [aːȵ]	eny [eȵ]						uny [uȵ]	ueny [uːȵ]		
Coda	-ŋ	ang [aŋ]	aeng [aːŋ]	eng [eŋ]	eeng [eːŋ]	ing [iŋ]	ieng [iːŋ]	ong [oŋ]	oeng [oːŋ]		ueng [uːŋ]	uung [ɯŋ]	uueng [ɯːŋ]
Coda	-p	ap [ap]	aep [aːp]	ep [ep]	eep [eːp]	ip [ip]	iep [iːp]	op [op]	oep [oːp]			uup [ɯp]	uuep [ɯːp]
Coda	-t	at [at]	aet [aːt]	et [et]	eet [eːt]	it [it]	iet [iːt]		oet [oːt]	ut [ut]	uet [uːt]	uut [ɯt]	uuet [ɯːt]
Coda	-ȶ	aty [aȶ]	aety [aːȶ]	ety [eȶ]					oety [oːȶ]	uty [uȶ]	uety [uːȶ]		
Coda	-k	ak [ak]	aek [aːk]	ek [ek]	eek [eːk]	ik [ik]	iek [iːk]	ok [ok]	oek [oːk]		uek [uːk]	uuk [ɯk]	uuek [ɯːk]

=== Tones ===
Has Hlai has 3 tones. Each tone can take two forms, depending on whether the syllable ends in a stop ("tonic tone") or not ("level tone").

(work in progress)	"level tone"		"tonic tone"	
High-Falling	(nothing added) [꜒꜔]	kai ("chicken")	(stop is doubled) [꜒꜔]	oekk ("to drink")
High-Flat	x [꜒꜒]	tax ("rice")	(nothing added) [꜒꜒]	hliet ("to cut")
Low-Flat	s [꜖꜖]	pas ("father")	s [꜖꜖]	daeps ("rope")

== Nouns ==
=== Common nouns ===
==== Related to mankind/person ====
- 【baiskaux】: (1) woman; (2) wife, it is only used by a husband to call his own wife; it is an impolite word to use to call others' wives.
- 【pasmaen】: (1) man; (2) husband, it is only used by a wife to call her own husband; it is an impolite word to use to call others' husbands.
- 【baisdza】: mother, it is used by a narrator. When a child calls his/her own mother, he/she uses the word "bais"
- 【pasdza】: (1) father, it is used by a narrator. When a child calls his/her own father, he/she uses the word "pas"; (2) a respected way to call an elderly man.

==== Related to objects/things ====
- 【ghang】: hill, mountain
- 【noms/nams】: (1) water; (2) river
- 【laengs】: sea
- 【fei】: (1) n.: fire; (2) v.: walk
- 【ghei】: rice

==== Related to time or space ====
- 【hwanneix】: today;【uuhaux】: tomorrow
- 【paisdeuu】: up;【paisfou】: down; 【paiskueng】: right;【paishluums】: left

=== Proper nouns ===
==== People ====
- Han (Chinese) name: All Li's Chinese names are loan words, borrowed from the Hainanese spoken language in the region called Uislius (黄流), e.g., Maeus zek dhongx, (Mao Zedong (毛泽东), the founder of the People's Republic of China.
- Hlai name: The Li people usually call their children with names from their own language (Hlai).

==== Group/organization/party ====
- These are loan words from Hainanese, e.g., Dangx Gok Gong Caens Dhaengs (中国共产党), Chinese Communist Party.

==== Places ====
- These are loan words from Hainanese, e.g., Bhakgengs, "Beijing, 北京 (capital of the People's Republic of China)"; Haeisnaems dhaeus, "Hainan Island, 海海南岛"; Lokdhongs, "Ledong, 乐东 (the central city of the tribe of Has Hlai )"

==== Nations ====
- Most are loan words from Hainanese, e.g., Dangx Gok, "China, 中国";
- few are not loan words, e.g., Moei, "Han people, 汉族"; Hlai, "Li people, 黎族"

=== Abstract nouns ===
These nouns are mostly loan words. The Hlai language being both practical and concrete in nature, is not suitable for describing anything intangible.

=== Basic rules for nouns ===
==== Numerals and classifiers ====
Nouns usually cannot be modified by number alone; the number needs a proper classifier following the number to modify the noun.

zuu lang dzax
a/one CL snake
"a snake"

But, nouns associated with dates (like year, month, day), are modified with numbers alone (no classifiers).

fus boux
three year
"three years"

hlaus hwan
two day
"two days"

ba nyaen
five month
"May"

When the word "nyaen" refers to the name of a month (as May above), a number can modify "nyaen" without a classifier. However, when the word "nyaen" refers to the number of months (as below), a classifier is required to modify the word "nyaen."

ba hom nyaen
five CL month
"five months"

Nouns cannot be modified by adverbs, nor can a noun be doubled (e.g., **uxaeu uxaeu, "man man"; **blongs blongs, "house house") to express the meaning of "every" as is done in Chinese. The way to present the meaning of "every" is to use the word "ranx" plus a proper classifier as below:

ranx zuen uxaeu
every CL man/one
"everyone"

ranx hom blongs
every CL house
"every house"

==== Gender ====
Although the Hlai language does not have declension of gender, it does have two prefixes to indicate the gender: "bais" for female and "pas" for male, e.g.

- pasdza, "father"
- baisdza, "mother"
- paskai, "cock/rooster" (kai: chicken)
- baiskai, "hen"
- pasdzuengsgong, "salesman" (dzuengs: sale, gong: stuff)
- baisdzuengsgong, "saleswoman"

When the word "bais" exists alone, the meaning is mother; "pas" means father. "Pas" could also be used as a classifier, e.g.,

Kun hluuekmuuen hauux zuu pas lax zuu hom.
PL {young man} those one CL eat one CL
"Each of those young men ate one."

==== Plural ====
The Hlai language does not use suffixes or prefixes for nouns to denote plurality as in the English language. But, the Hlai language uses the word "kun" to indicate the plurality of nouns, e.g.

Kun aeudza rien tun raeu dhuus fou cai.
PL {old man} say/talk/speak word laugh in under tree
"The old men were telling jokes under the tree."

The word "kun" can also be used together with a number and a classifier to modify nouns, e.g.,

Kun hlaus zuen kauus fuuek riens paens.
PL two CL {older sister} weave skirt {decorative pattern}
"The two older sisters were weaving skirts with a decorative pattern."

==== Use of nouns ====
A noun can be a subject, predicate, object, e.g.

cai tuuen ceeng
tree {out of} flower
subject {} object
"trees bloom (flowers)"

Veengs hauux veengs meuu.
shirt/top that shirt/top you.SG
subject {} predicate {}
"That shirt/top is yours."

A noun can be an attribute, and also can be modified by attributes e.g.

Meuu kweis ojiep caqias Hlai da?
you want learn script Li Q
"Do you want to learn Hlai script?"

A noun can also be an adverbial modifier, e.g.

Tong neix cai vuek.
tong this tree/wood do/make
"This hookah is made out of wood." (tong = An apparatus for smoking, such as a hookah)

A noun in relation to time can even be an adverbial modifier to modify a verb, e.g.

Hwanneix fous dhat lo!
today hot very ACCENT
"It's so hot today!"

Na uunyeuu hei zok das.
he/she {day after tomorrow} go to/toward {mother's mother}
"He is going to grandma's house the day after tomorrow."

Fa uupans beuuluueng.
we yesterday {come back}
"We came back yesterday."

==== Possessive phrases ====
When the word "guu" is placed before a noun to indicate subordination, this combination functions as a possessive phrase, and can only be in the predicate of the sentence, e.g.

Vabheny neix guu Dongxgok.
airplane this POSS China
"This airplane belongs to China."

Hlaus lang duis neix guu Laufus.
two CL {water buffalo} this POSS {Mr. Fu}
"These two water buffaloes belong to Mr. Fu."

== Verbs ==
=== Action verbs ===
- 【vuek，做】: to do, make...(it is used frequently)
- 【lax，吃】: (1) to eat, drink, smoke...; (2) to swallow up (it is used frequently)
- 【duuengx，给】: to give
- 【taeix，打】: to strike, hit
- 【bleuu，听】: (1) to hear; (2) to feel
- 【dzok，偷】: to steal
- 【zongs，坐】: to sit
- 【ghais，叫，请，派】: to tell someone(s) to do something; to invite...
- 【fei，走】: (1) v.: to walk; (2) n.: fire
- 【cuuek，休息】: to rest
- 【tuas，欺骗】: to cheat
- 【liengs，看守】: to watch, to guard
- others

=== Linking verbs ===
- 【man，是】: am, is, are (be verbs, sometimes omitted in the sentence)
- 【ghwaix，不是】: am not, is not, are not

=== Verbs for expressing mental activities ===
- 【dhas，怕】: to fear, to be afraid of
- 【ngop，想念】: to long to see again, to miss
- 【oep，爱】: to love, to like
- 【vuuengx，心里烦乱】: confusing, disorderly (used as a verb)
- 【luuemx，忘记】: to forget
- 【uuen，埋怨】: to complain
- 【tuuenngaen，生气】: to be angry (other similar word: kis, kisngaen)
- 【dhaix，忍受】: to endure, to bear
- others

=== Verbs for expressing existence, change, development ===
- 【dhuus，在】:(1) v.: to exist; (2) prep.: in, on, at
- 【zaux，有】: to have, there is/are
- 【hlaeux，死】: (1) v.: to die; (2) n.: death
- 【hlou，生】: (1) v.: to give birth; (2) adj.: alive, living
- 【long，长大】: (1) v.: to grow up; (2) adj.: big, large
- 【dzauux，变】: to change
- others

=== Modal verbs ===
- 【gieu，能】: to be good at, to be able to, can
- 【gax，不能】: to be unable to, cannot
- 【kweis，愿意】: to be willing to
- 【ais，不愿】: to be not willing to
- 【dheeng-hwoek，同意，愿意】: to agree with, to be willing to
- 【kueng，会】: to know how to, to be able to
- 【boei，不会】: to not know how to, to be unable to
- 【loepp，可以，能够】: to be allowed to, to be able to
- 【guulax，必须，应该】: must, should
- 【kiemx，必须，应该】: must, should (this is a loan word)
- 【komx，必须，应该】: must, should (this is a loan word)
- 【auux，敢】: to dare to
- others

=== Verbs of motion ===
- 【buuen，来】: to come
- 【hei，去】: to go
- 【beuu，回】: to go back to, to return
- 【luueng，返】: to return
- 【dhuas，过】: to pass through
- 【kaen，上】: to go up
- 【luei，下】: to go down
- 【hluet，进】: to go into
- 【tuuen，出】: (1) v.: to go out, to leave, to exit; (2) prep.: from
- 【dhaens，到】: to arrive

=== Basic rules for verbs ===
==== Tense/aspect ====
In Hlai language, verbs never change their form. The placement of an adverb or an auxiliary word after or before a verb determines the verb's tense.

===== Progressive aspect =====
The adverbial word "faets" or "fietla" can express the action in process, and is placed before a verb, e.g.,

Na faets lax tax.
he/she ADV.PROG eat rice
"He is eating." (Chinese: 他 正在 吃 饭)

Daty faets bheny.
bird ADV.PROG fly
"The birds are flying." (Chinese: 鸟 正在 飞)

Hluuek na fietla laix dax.
child he/she ADV.PROG plough field
"His children/child are/is plowing the field." (Chinese: 他的孩子正在犁田)

===== Perfect aspect =====
The verbs with the word "bhaeis" expresses an action that has already happened. If "bhaeis" is placed before a verb, it is an adverbial, e.g.,

Hluuek na bhaeis hei ang he.
child he/she ADV.PERF go field ACCENT
"His children/child already went to the field." (Chinese: 他的孩子已经去山栏地了)

Pashlaus na bhaeis bleuu fan rien, "Eis, hluumsghweuu na guu. loms cas da?"
{older brother} he/she ADV.PERF hear then say ACCENT {don't know} he/she FUT still/again or not
'When his brother heard of it, he said, "Oh, I don't know that he would still do that (or) not?"' (Chinese: 他哥哥（已经）听了便说，"哎，不知道他还要这样不?")

If the word "bhaeis" is placed after a verb, it acts as a complement and means "finished", e.g.,

Hou lax tax bhaeis goms hei.
I eat rice finished then go
"After I finish dinner, I'll go." (Chinese: 我吃完饭就去)

The word "dhuas" can also denote the perfect aspect, ("(1) v.: pass through; (2) an auxiliary word that indicates that an action has already happened, and is placed after the verb; (3) an auxiliary word that expresses a comparison, and is placed after the adjective") e.g.,

Meuu laeis zuu zuen aeu neix dhuas cas da?
you see one CL person/people this PERF or not
"Have you ever seen this man?" (Chinese: 你见过这个人吗？)

Dhes da rien dhongneix dhuas.
I not say/speak {like this} PERF
"I didn't say anything like that." (Chinese: 我没有说过这样的话)

===== Future aspect =====
The auxiliary word "kweis" or "guu" indicates that an action is in future by being placed before a verb, e.g.,

Na kweis hei Damxax.
he/she FUT go {Sanya city}
"He is going to Sanya." (Chinese: 他要去三亚)

Meuu kweis vuek meshes?
you FUT do/make what
"What will you do?" (Chinese: 你要干什么？)

The nuance between the two words "kweis" and "guu" is that: when two verbs are used together, if the first one is the method of the second one, or the second one is the purpose of the first one, only the word "guu" can be placed before the second verb, e.g.,

Bhoek noms guu roengx tax.
carry water {for the purpose of} cook rice
"bring the water (used) for cooking" (Chinese: 打水煮饭)

===== Others =====
If an action only lasts for a short while, the adverbial word "zuufanx" is placed after the verb, e.g.,

Gaux zuufanx.
{lie down} {a short while}
"Lie down (for) a short while." (Chinese: 躺一会儿)

Duuengx hou cat zuufanx.
{to let/to allow} I wear {a short while}
"Let me wear it (for) a short while." (Chinese: 给我穿一下子)

==== Verbs as predicates ====
Hlai verbs, including action verbs, verbs for expressing mental activities, and verbs for expressing existence, change, and development, can be predicates or predicate heads in a sentence. Most of these verbs can be followed by objects or by complements, and can be modified by adverbials, nouns of time, and auxiliary words, e.g.,

Dhes naeus buuen.
I just come
"I just came here." (Chinese: 我刚来)

Mieu gaenys diu.
cat bite mouse
"A cat bites a mouse." (Chinese: 猫咬老鼠)

Pasdza dhuus blongs.
father {exist in} house
"Father is at home." (Chinese: 父亲在家)

Meuu uuhaux kweis hei da?
you tomorrow FUT go not
"Are you going tomorrow (or not)?" (Chinese: 你明天去吗？)

==== Nominal verbs ====
Hlai verbs, except for linking verbs, can usually be made nominal by adding a prefix "uu-"; nominal verbs can be a subject, but cannot be a major part of the predicate, e.g.,

Uu-laix hauux dax hou.
NMLZ-plow that field my
"The field that has been plowed is mine." (Chinese: 那犁过的是我的田)

Uu-buuen hauux ghueng dhes.
NMLZ-come that {young brother or sister} my
"The one who is coming is my brother/sister." (Chinese: 那个来的是我的弟弟（妹妹）)

Nominal verbs still can function as a verb with an object following it; the nominal verb and the object together can function as a subject, object or nominal predicate, e.g.,

Duis neix man uu-duuengx hlausghueng.
buffalo this is NMLZ-give relatives
"The buffalo is for (giving to) the relatives." (Chinese: 这牛是给亲戚的)

Uu-oep hou man dhangjis hou.
NMLZ-love me is comrade my
"The one who loves me is my comrade." (Chinese: 爱我的是我的同志)

==== Doubling ====
Hlai verbs are rarely doubled as they are in Chinese; only monosyllabic action verbs and verbs for expressing mental activities can be doubled. Doubled monosyllabic verbs imply that the action is casually and carelessly done, e.g.,

Na bleuu bleuu fan beuu.
he/she hear hear then {go back}
"He (only) heard about/of it and went back." (Chinese: 他听了听就回去了)

Kun hluuekueng dzueis dzueis fan fei hluet blongs.
PL {young girl} look look then walk {go into} house
"The girls (only) taking a quick look, then went into the house." (Chinese: 姑娘们看了看就走进屋里去了)

A verb followed by "laeis" comes to mean "to try"; if a verb is followed by an object, the word "laeis" should be placed after the object, e.g.,

Hou qim laeis.
I taste try
"I'll try (to taste) it." (Chinese: 我尝尝看)

Meuu dzueis dhang na laeis.
{You (s.)} look face he/she try
"You try to look at his face." (Chinese: 你看看他的脸)

==== Modal verbs ====
Modal verbs are usually placed before a verb forming the predicate of a sentence to express 1) the ability of the one performing the action, or 2) the possibility, obligation, or need of the action, e.g.,

Dhes kueng rien tun Moei.
I {know how} say/speak word Han/Chinese
"I can speak Chinese." (Chinese: 我会讲汉语)

Meuu kiemx hei geek guns.
You should/must go {look for} firewood
"You should look for firewood." (Chinese: 你应该去砍柴)

Meuu guulax dhongneix vuek naus dhiu.
you should/must {like this} do just right
"You must do (it) like this, (for it) to be done just right." (Chinese: 你必须这样做才对)

Na gax vuek gong neix.
he/she {be not able} do work this
"He is not able to do this work." (Chinese: 他无法做这个工作)

Modal verbs cannot be followed by noun-objects, nor can modal verbs be doubled, except in an interrogative sentence, that a positive and negative modal verb is used to ask yes or no, e.g.,

Meuu kueng da kueng?
You {know how} not {know how}
"Do you know how to do it (or not)?" (Chinese: 你会不会？)

Only in answering questions, can a modal verb act alone as a predicate, except for the modal verbs "kiemx", "guulax" and the word "guu", which cannot act as a predicate, e.g.,

Meuu gieu rien tun Hlai cas da? Dhes gieu.
You {be able to} say/speak word Li or not? I {be able to}
"Can you speak the Hlai/Li language? I can." (Chinese: 你能说黎语吗？我能)

Modal verbs sometimes can be followed by an object, e.g.,

Na bhaeis o kueng qias Hlai he.
he already {learn (loan word)} {know how} script Li ACCENT
"He already learned the Hlai's/Li's script." (Chinese: 他已经学会黎文了)

The antonym of the modal verb "kweis" is "ais"; the antonym of "kueng" is "hluums", and that of "gieu" is "gax", which cannot be used in the imperative mood.

==== Verbs of motion ====
Verbs of motion can act alone as a predicate, e.g.,

Uengxtoengs buuen res!
everyone come ACCENT
"Everyone, come!" (Chinese: 大家来吧！)

Also, verbs of motion can follow a main verb to express the direction of the action forming a predicate, e.g.,

Dhes fei hluet blongs.
I walk {go into} house
"I walked into the house." (Chinese: 我走进屋里)

Na tuuen blongs ghoux tuuen buuen.
he/she from house run {go out} come
"He ran out of the house." (Chinese: 他从屋里跑出来)

Zuufanx blei hei, zuufanx blei luueng.
{a short while} swim {go to}, {a short while} swim {go back}
"swim back and forth." (Chinese: 一会儿游去，一会儿游回)

Also, verbs of motion can combine together and become compound words as can be seen in the chart below:

	buuen (来, to come)	hei (去, to go to)	beuu (回, to go back)
luueng (回返, back)	buuenluueng，回来	heiluueng，回去	beuuluueng，回去
dhuas (过, pass)	buuendhuas，过来	heidhuas，过去	beuudhuas，回去，过去
kaen (上, up)	buuenkaen，上来	heikaen，上去	beuukaen，回去，上去
luei (下, down)	buuenluei，下来	heiluei，下去	beuuluei，回去，下去
hluet (进, into)	buuenhluet，进来	heihluet，进去	beuuhluet，回去，进去
tuuen (出, out)	buuentuuen，出来	heituuen，出去	beuutuuen，回去，出去
beuu (回, back)	buuenbeuu，回来	heibeuu，回去	

The compound words above can be followed by objects, e.g.,

Hou hwanneix bhaeis duengx heikaen hwous.
I today already carry/bring {go up} mountain
"I have already brought (it) to the mountain today." (Chinese: 我今天已经送到山上去)

Pasdza ghuis na heihluet hwous hloek.
Father lead/direct he/she {go into} mountain deep
"Father took him into the remote mountains." (Chinese: 父亲带他进入深山)

Pasbhanghlauux fan beuuluueng blongs.
{name of a man} then {come back} home
"Then, Pasbhanghlauux went home." (Chinese: Pasbhanghlauux 便回家去)

Except for the word "luueng", the words found in the first column of the chart ("dhuas", "kaen", "luei", "hluet", "tuuen", and "beuu") and the words found along the top row ("buuen", "hei", and "beuu") can exchange positions. After exchanging positions, the compound words cannot be followed by an object, and usually are used in imperative mood.

==== Linking verbs ====
Linking verbs are placed before nouns, noun phrases or pronouns, combining two grammatical parts as a predicate, to provide information about the objects, e.g.,

Hou man Hlai, ghwaix Moei.
I am Li, {am not} Han/Chinese
"I am a Li, not a Han." (Chinese: 我是黎族，不是汉族)

Na man pashlaus hou.
He is {older brother} my
"He is my older brother." (Chinese: 他是我的哥哥)

The linking verbs can be omitted, e.g.,

Na pasghueng hou.
He {younger brother} my
"He is my younger brother." (Chinese: 他是我的弟弟)

But, when the subject or predicate is too long, or when the predicate includes numbers, the linking verbs cannot be omitted, e.g.,

Gha uengxtoengs bhaeisbhaeis ruus man uxaeu Dongxgok.
We everyone all all are people China
"All of us are Chinese." (Chinese: 咱们大家都是中国人)

Linking verbs cannot go with words that indicate the tense (like "faets" or "bhaeis" or "dhuas"), nor with directional verbs or with the complement, nor be modified by adverbials, or be doubled.

==== Reciprocal verbs ====
When the suffix "toengs" is added to some verbs, the compound words become reciprocal verbs, and cannot be followed by any objects, e.g.,

Duis tut'toengs.
{Water buffalo} {collide with each other}
"The buffaloes collided with each other." (Chinese: 牛互相碰撞)

Na hlaus zuen oeptoengs dhat.
He/she two CL {love each other} truly
"The two of them love each other very much." (Chinese: 他们两人很相爱)

==== Nouns and verbs ====
Some words in Hlai language are both nouns and verbs, e.g.,

	noun	verb
fun	fun long rain big "heavy rain" (Chinese: 大雨)	fun bhe! rain, ACCENT "It is raining!" (Chinese: 下雨了！)
coem	coem cai fruit tree "fruit" (Chinese: 果子)	cai coem tree {bear fruit} "The tree bears fruit." (Chinese: 树结果)
dzuuem	dzuuem kai egg chicken "chicken egg" (Chinese: 鸡蛋)	kai dzuuem chicken {lay egg} "The chicken is laying an egg." (Chinese: 鸡下蛋)
haeis	haeis duis excrement {water buffalo} "water buffalo's excrement" (Chinese: 牛屎)	duis haeis {water buffalo} excrement "The water buffalo is defecating." (Chinese: 牛拉屎)

In Chinese and English, the verb "wear" can apply to different actions, like wearing a necklace, wearing a hat, or wearing earrings. However, in Hlai language these different actions are distinguished by different verbs, e.g.,

- "to wear"
  - kienx (for wearing a necklace);
  - mieng (for wearing earrings);
  - ngwaus (for wearing a hat);
  - pien (for wearing a skirt, pants, shoes);
  - cat (for wearing a top, a shirt)
- "noise"
  - roeng (from an insect or bird);
  - vuns (from a dog);
  - hyoen (from a rooster);
  - ngwaety (from a human)

== Adjectives ==
=== Describing the characteristics of a person or thing ===
- 【hleny，好】: good
- 【reek，坏】: bad, not good
- 【kaeix，冷】: cold
- 【fous/faus，热】: hot
- 【dza，老】: old
- 【bluuek，年轻】: young
- 【hloek，深】: deep
- 【tuuens，浅】: shallow
- others

=== Describing the forms/attributes of thing ===
- 【long，大】: big, large
- 【enyx，小】: small
- 【peek，高】: tall, high
- 【tauus，矮】: short
- 【daeus，长】: long
- 【taty，短】: short
- others

=== Describing the state of actions or emotions ===
- 【dzuuns，快】: quick
- 【dais，慢】: slow
- 【hluengs，松】: loose
- 【guung，紧】: tight
- 【hlenyfaty，快乐】: happy
- 【heen，容易】: easy
- others

=== Basic rules for adjectives ===
==== Use of adjectives ====
In Hlai language, adjectives cannot be a subject, nor an object, but can act as a predicate, attribute, adverbial, or complement.

===== As a predicate =====
The adjective goes after the subject, e.g.,

Zuu hom coem hauux long baisias.
One CL fruit that big/large {very much}
"That fruit (is) large!" (Chinese: 那一个果子很大)

Zuu zuen aeu max reek.
One CL man/person there bad
"That man (is) bad/notorious." (Chinese: 那一个人坏)

===== As an attribute =====
The adjective goes after the noun that is modified, e.g.,

dhop kieu
cloth blue/green
"(a) blue cloth" (Chinese: 蓝布)

fun long
rain big
"heavy rain" (Chinese: 大雨)

===== As an adverbial =====
The adjective is placed before the verb, e.g.,

Meuu dais dais lax as.
You slow slow eat ACCENT
"(You) Eat slowly." (Chinese: 你慢慢地吃吧！)

Na kauuspaeis fei.
He/she {swift in action} walk
"He walked quickly." (Chinese: 他迅速地走)

===== As a complement =====
The adjective usually comes after the verb in a sentence, e.g.,

Na vuek reek he.
He/she do/make bad ACCENT
"He has broken (it)." (Chinese: 他弄坏了)

Meuu bhaeis laix hleny hyos?
You already plow well Q
"Have you finished plowing?" (Chinese: 你已经犁好了吗？)

==== Adverbs ====
An adjective also can be modified by adverbs, which can be placed either before or after the adjective, e.g.,

da hleny
not good
"not good" (Chinese: 不好)

vaeu reek
most bad
"worst" (Chinese: 最坏)

paens dhatdhat
colorful/floral truly/really
"very colorful" (Chinese: 很花)

==== Comparison ====
In Hlai language, adjectives have comparative and superlative degrees.

===== Comparative degree =====
Either "dhuas" or "bhi", denote comparative degree; the former one is a Hlai word, the latter a loan word. If the word "dhuas" is used, it should be placed after the adjective, and the adjective and "dhuas" should be placed between the two objects being compared, e.g.,

Baisdza peek dhuas hluuekbaiskaux.
Mother tall {more than} daughter
"The mother is taller than her daughter." (Chinese: 母亲高过女儿)

If the loan word "bhi" is used, it is placed between the two objects being compared, and the adjective is placed after the latter object, e.g.,

Meuu bhi dhes peek.
You COMP I tall
"You are taller than I (am)." (Chinese: 你比我高)

===== Superlative degree =====
Either "vaeu" or "duix", denote superlative degree; the former one is a Hlai word, the latter a loan word. If either "vaeu" or "duix" is used, it should be placed before the adjective, e.g.,

Pashlaus vaeu gieu.
{Older brother} most capable
"The older brother is most capable." (Chinese: 哥哥最能干)

Baiscuty duix hlenymuuen.
{Youngest daughter} most beautiful
"The youngest daughter is most beautiful." (Chinese: 幺妹最漂亮)

According to my Hlai language consultant, Mr. Liu, "The word veau could possibly imply a derogatory, an exaggerated or overstated statement." It depends on the context.

===== Others =====
"Zuugit", instead of indicating comparative or superlative degrees, denotes "(just) a little bit", e.g.,

Zuu kuuengx cai neix peek zuugit.
One CL tree this tall {a little bit}
"This three is just a little bit taller." (Chinese: 这棵树高一点)

==== Nominal adjectives ====
Except for adjectives that describe a mental/emotional status, adjectives can be made nominal by adding the prefix "uu-". Adjectives that are nominal cannot be a predicate, but can act as a subject, an object, or an attribute, e.g.,

Uu-hleny neix man guu meuu.
{The good one} this is POSS you
"This good one is yours." (Chinese: 这个好的是你的)

Na qieng dheuu uu-daeus.
He/she {want to} take {the long one}
"He wants to take the long one." (Chinese: 他想拿长的)

Kai uu-long hauux man guu dhes.
Chicken {the big one} that is POSS me
"That big chicken is mine." (Chinese: 那只大的鸡是我的)

==== Doubling ====
Adjectives for describing the forms/attributes of things, and those for describing the status of actions or emotions, can be doubled, but the adjective has to be monosyllabic. When the adjectives are doubled, the degree of the adjective increases, e.g.,

veengs kaeu kaeu
shirt/top white white
"white clothes" (Chinese: 白白的衣服)

dais dais fei
slow slow walk
"walk slowly" (Chinese: 慢慢走)

(When the Hlai people are saying farewell (bye), "dais dais fei" is the phrase they say to each other.)

Two different adjectives can be doubled like AABB, e.g.,

Blongs dhes baen baen hleny hleny.
House my new new good good
"My house is new and good." (Chinese: 我的房子又新又好)

Two different adjectives also can be positioned in an ABAB pattern, e.g.,

Guen neix peek tauus peek tauus.
Road this high short high short
"This road is rough/bumpy." (Chinese: 这条路高高低低)

Also, some monosyllabic adjectives express an increasing degree by the adding of a prefix, which combines the initial consonant of that adjective with a vowel like "i" or "u"; and the tone of the prefix is the first tone, e.g.,

li-loek
INT-dark
"pitch-dark" (Chinese: 黑漆漆)

gu-goeks
INT-concave
"full of bumps and holes/uneven" (Chinese: 黑漆漆)

==== Duplicated suffix ====
Some adjectives can have a duplicated suffix tagged on to the ends, which cannot exist independently, to intensify the description, e.g.,

kaeu-laepplaepp
{white-something looks bright}
"something is so white as to be bright" (Chinese: 亮晶晶)

tax fous-qiettqiett
rice {hot-something looks hot}
"the hot rice" (Chinese: 饭热乎乎)

==== Small and large ====
The word "enyx" is used to describe something small, and can either be placed before the noun or after; either way the emphasis is on the latter word, e.g.,

"enyx" + noun	noun + "enyx"
enyx hla small fish "small fish" (Chinese: 小鱼)	hla enyx fish small "small fish" (Chinese: 小的鱼)
enyx kai small chicken "chick" (Chinese: 小鸡)	kai enyx chicken small "chick" (Chinese: 小的鸡)

The word "long" is used to describe something big or large, and can either be placed before the noun or after; either way the emphasis is on the former word, e.g.,

"long" + noun	noun + "long"
long duis big {water buffalo} "big buffalo" (Chinese: 大的水牛)	duis long {water buffalo} big "big buffalo" (Chinese: 大水牛)
long hwoet big wind "big wind" (Chinese: 大的风)	hwoet long wind big "big wind" (Chinese: 大风)

Another way to express something big or large is to add the prefix "bais-" to nouns related to objects/things; but, if the prefix "bais-" is added to nouns related to mankind/persons, it becomes an indicator of gender, e.g.,

bais-fun
{big rain}
"heavy rain" (Chinese: 大雨)

bais-kuuengxcai
{big tree}
"big tree" (Chinese: 大树)

Nouns that have the prefix "bais-" added on to them can be modified by the word "long" to increase the degree, e.g.,

bais-qien long
{big stone} big
"large stone" (Chinese: 很大的石头)

If the speaker intends to increase the degree, the word "dhat" or "dhatdhat" can be added.

== Numbers ==
Numbers in Hlai language, including cardinal numbers, ordinal numbers, and numbers of approximation, usually act as subjects, predicate, or objects in a sentence. When numbers are used with classifiers, together they become a phrase that can be an attribute to modify the noun phrase.

=== Cardinal numbers ===
==== Basic numbers units ====
- 【ceuus/zeuus/zuu，一】: one (in some case, the word "lax" also mean the digit—"one")
- 【hlaus，二】: two
- 【fus，三】: three
- 【caus，四】: four
- 【ba，五】: five
- 【dom，六】: six
- 【tou，七】: seven
- 【ghou，八】: eight
- 【fauus，九】: nine
- 【fuet，十】: ten
- 【ghwaen，百】: hundred
- 【nguen，千】: thousand
- 【vaens，万】: ten thousand

==== Basic numbers unit combinations ====
- 【fuet ceuus，十一】: eleven
- 【fuet hlaus，十二】: twelve
- 【hlaus fuet，二十】: twenty
- 【fus fuet ba，三十五】: thirty five
- 【lax ghwaen hlaus fuet，一百二十】: one hundred twenty
- 【caus nguen uengx ceuus，四千零一】: four thousand zero one (4,001)
- 【zuu vaens，一万】: ten thousand

==== With nouns ====
Cardinal numbers by themselves usually cannot modify nouns, but need to be placed before a classifier to modify the noun that goes after the classifier, e.g.,

zuu lang kai
one CLF chicken
"one chicken" (Chinese: 一只鸡)

hlaus nguen kuuengx cai
two thousand CLF tree
"two thousand trees" (Chinese: 两千棵树)

However, in relation to dates (like year, month, day), numbers can modify these types of nouns without classifiers.

Meuuda doengs dhuus Bhakgengs zuu boux hei lo.
you live in Beijing one year pass ACCENT
"You have lived in Beijing for a year." (Chinese: 你们住在北京一年了)

Na hlaus hwan da kaen hwous geek guns lo.
he two day not {go up} mountain search firewood ACCENT
"These past two days he has not gone up to the mountain to look for firewood." (Chinese: 他两天不上山砍柴了)

==== Doubling ====
Cardinal numbers cannot be doubled, except for with "nguen" and "vaens"; when their pattern is AABB, and the resulting phrase means a number of great amount, e.g.,

Zaux nguen nguen vaens vaens aeu buuen.
have thousand thousand {ten thousand} {ten thousand} man come
"There are thousands of people coming." (Chinese: 有千千万万的人来)

Sometimes, the words "nguen" and "vaens" combine with "jieng" or "zuu" to form an ABAC phrase to modify a noun, synonymous in meaning to the AABB pattern, e.g.,

Zaux jieng nguen jieng vaens aeu hei.
have form thousand form {ten thousand} man go
"There are thousands of people going." (Chinese: 有成千成万的人去)

Zuu nguen zuu vaens aeu ngan qieng fas fun.
one thousand one {ten thousand} man all desire sky rain
"Thousands of people look forward to the rain." (Chinese: 千千万万的人都盼望天下雨)

==== One ====
There are four words ("zuu", "ceuus/zeuus", and "lax") that can represent the place value of "one", but each word has its own usage.

First, when Hlai people count, they will say, "ceuus/zeuus, hlaus, fus, caus…(1, 2, 3, 4…)", they won't use "zuu" or "lax" for one.

The word "zuu" needs to go with a classifier to modify a noun.

zuu lang duis
one CLF {water buffalo}
"one water buffalo" (Chinese: 一只水牛)

The digit 1, when it is either in the 100's, 1,000's, 10,000's, 100,000's.... place of a number, the word "zuu" should be used for 1, e.g.,

zuu ghwaen
one hundred
"one hundred" (Chinese: 一百)

zuu nguen
one thousand
"one thousand" (Chinese: 一千)

The digit 1, when it is either in the 10's or 1's place of a number, the word "ceuus/zeuus" should be used for 1, e.g.,

zuu ghwaen ceuus/zeuus fuet
one hundred one ten
"one hundred and ten (110)" (Chinese: 一百一十)

zuu vaens zuu nguen ceuus/zeuus fuet ceuus/zeuus
one {ten hundred} one thousand one ten one
"eleven thousand and eleven (11,011)" (Chinese: 一万一千零一十一)

zuu ghwaen uengx ceuus/zeuus
one hundred and one
"one hundred and one (101)" (Chinese: 一百零一)

However, if the number is used with a classifier, then the word "zuu" should be used, e.g.,

zuu nguen uengx zuu hom
one thousand and one CLF
"one thousand and one (objects)" (Chinese: 一千零一个)

The word "lax" cannot be used with a classifier. The word "lax" only can be used in the first digit when the number is bigger than ten. However, if the number is multiple of 10 like 100, 1000, 10000...etc., the word "zuu" should be used, instead of "lax". e.g.,

lax fuet ceuus/zeuus (= fuet ceuus/zeuus)
one ten one (= ten one)
"eleven (11)" (Chinese: 一十一)

lax nguen dom ghwaen (= zuu nguen dom ghwaen)
one thousand six hundred (= one thousand six hundred)
"one thousand six hundred (1600)" (Chinese: 一千六百)

==== Ten ====
There are two words ("fuet" and "bun") that are used for the place value of "ten," but each word has its usage.

First, "fuet" is used for the number ten when counting.

"Bun" does not need to go with a classifier to modify a noun. However, if the word "bun" does go with a classifier to modify a noun, the only two classifiers that can be used are "hom" and "lang"; but when "lang" is used with people, "bun" cannot be used.

hlaus bun hom gan (= hlaus bun gan)
two ten CLF money (= two ten money)
"twenty dollars" (Chinese: 二十块钱)

fus bun lang kai (= fus bun kai)
three ten CLF chicken (= three ten chicken)
"thirty chickens" (Chinese: 三十只鸡)

"Fuet" needs to go with a classifier to modify a noun, e.g.,

fuet lang duis
ten CLF {water buffalo}
"ten water buffalo" (Chinese: 十只水牛)

However, "fuet" can be placed in front of nouns, which are also classifiers, e.g.,

ba fuet boux
five ten CLF/year
"fifty years" (Chinese: 五十岁)

fus fuet waeu
three ten CLF/bowl
"thirty bowls" (Chinese: 三十岁)

==== Zero ====
In Hlai language, there is no word for the number "zero"; some areas adopted the loan word "lengs" (零，zero), e.g.,

zuu ghwaen lengs ba
one hundred zero five
"one hundred and five (105)" (Chinese: 一百零五)

However, the number "zero" can be represented by the conjunction "uengx" or "loms", e.g.,

zuu ghwaen uengx hlaus (hom)
one hundred and two (CLF)
"one hundred and two (102)" (Chinese: 一百零二（个）)

fus nguen loms hlaus fuet (hom)
three thousand again two ten (CLF)
"three thousand and twenty (3020)" (Chinese: 三千零二十（个）)

==== Rules for large numbers ====
In Hlai language, there are two rules to construct numbers:

(1) when any single digit from 1 to 9 is placed after "fuet", "ghwaen", "nguen", or "vaens", the relation between the digit and the word is addition, e.g.,

fuet ceuus {(= fuet + ceuus)}
ten one {}
"eleven (11)" (Chinese: 十一)

fuet hlaus {(= fuet + hlaus)}
ten two {}
"twelve (12)" (Chinese: 十二)

(2) when any single digit from 1 to 9 is placed before "fuet", "ghwaen", "nguen", or "vaens", the relation between the digit and the word is multiplication, e.g.,

fus fuet {(= fus × fuet)}
three ten {}
"thirty (30)" (Chinese: 三十)

hlaus ghwaen {(= hlaus × ghwaen)}
two hundred {}
"two hundred (200)" (Chinese: 二百)

=== Ordinal numbers ===
In Hlai language, the word "ghwous" (头，head) or "ceuus" (一，one) means "first", and the word "cuty" (尾，tail) means "last"; for all numbers in between first and last, the word "tom" (中间，middle) is used.

hluuek-ghwous-ghwa
{child-head-to plant}
"the first born child" (usually, it means "son"; Chinese: 老大（长子）)

hluuek-tom
child-middle
"the child(ren) in the middle" (Chinese: 老二，老三…)

hluuek-cuty
child-tail
"the youngest child" (Chinese: 老幺)

When one's gender is needed, the word "pasmaen" (男人，man) or "baiskaux" (女人，woman) can be added, e.g.,

hluuek-pasmaen-ghwous-ghwa = hluuek-ghwous-ghwa
{child-man-head-to plant} = {child-head-to plant}
"the first born son" (Chinese: 长子)

hluuek-baiskaux-ghwous-ghwa = hluuek-baiskaux-long
{child-woman-head-to plant} = child-woman-big
"the first born daughter" (Chinese: 大女儿)

Usually "ghwous" indicates the oldest male; "long" the oldest female, like "kauuslong" (大姐, oldest sister), "zoulong" (大嫂，wife of oldest brother).

Moreover, the prefix "pas-" (男性，man) or "bais-" (女性，woman) can be added to the words "tom" and "cuty", to indicate gender, e.g.,

pas-tom
M-middle
"the son in the middle" (Chinese: 次子)

bais-cuty
F-tail
"the youngest daughter" (Chinese: 幺女)

When ordinal numbers apply to things, usually the phrase is constructed by "ghwous" + "zuu" + a proper classifier to represent the first one, e.g.,

ghwous zuu kuuengx
head one CL.tree
"the first (tree)" (Chinese: 头一棵)

To present the last one, usually the phrase is constructed with the words "baiscuty" + "zuu" + a proper classifier, e.g.,

baiscuty zuu hom
last/tail one CL
"the last (one)" (Chinese: 最后一个)

To present the middle one(s), usually the phrase is constructed with the words "baistom" + "zuu" + a proper classifier, e.g.,

baistom zuu lang
middle one CL
"the 2nd, or 3rd…" (Chinese: 第二，或第三…)

==== Counting with ordinal numbers ====
Usually, any accuracy in communication is done with loan words from Chinese, e.g.,

- 【dhoeis-iet，第一】: first
- 【dhoeis-dzis，第二】: second
- 【dhoeis-das，第三】: third
- 【dhoeis-dis，第四】: fourth
- 【dhoeis-ngau，第五】: fifth
- 【dhoeis-laekk，第六】: sixth
- 【dhoeis-qiet，第七】: seventh
- 【dhoeis-bhoeix，第八】: eighth
- 【dhoeis-gaeus，第九】: ninth
- 【dhoeis-dapp，第十】: tenth

dhoeis-bhoeix dhuix
eighth team
"the eighth team" (Chinese: 第八队)

==== Counting the passage of years, months, days, or time ====
In Hlai culture, people use a way similar to the Chinese Zodiac to count years, and even days, e.g.,

- year
  - 【boux-diu，鼠年】: the year of the mouse
  - 【boux-duis，牛年】: the year of the buffalo
  - 【boux-cauus，鱼年】: the year of the fish
  - 【boux-bous，兔年】: the year of the rabbit
  - 【boux-dang，龙年】: the year of the dragon
  - 【boux-zan，虫年】: the year of the insect
  - 【boux-ngas，马年】: the year of the horse
  - 【boux-mat，人年】: the year of the man
  - 【boux-nok，猴年】: the year of the monkey
  - 【boux-kai，鸡年】: the year of the chicken
  - 【boux-tety/hwanba，狗年】: the year of the dog
  - 【boux-bou，猪年】: the year of the pig
- day
  - 【hwan-diu，鼠日】: the day of the mouse
  - 【hwan-duis，牛日】: the day of the buffalo
  - 【hwan-cauus，鱼日】: the day of the fish
  - 【hwan-bous，兔日】: the day of the rabbit
  - 【hwan-dang，龙日】: the day of the dragon
  - 【hwan-zan，虫日】: the day of the insect
  - 【hwan-ngas，马日】: the day of the horse
  - 【hwan-mat，人日】: the day of the man
  - 【hwan-nok，猴日】: the day of the monkey
  - 【hwan-kai，鸡日】: the day of the chicken
  - 【hwan-tety/hwanba，狗日】: the day of the dog
  - 【hwan-bou，猪日】: the day of the pig

For counting months, in Hlai culture, there are two kinds of calendar: one is following the Han's solar calendar, e.g.,

1. 【zuu-nyaen-baen，一月、正月】: January
2. 【hlaus-nyaen，二月】: February
3. 【fus-nyaen，三月】: March
4. 【caus-nyaen，四月】: April
5. 【ba-nyaen，五月】: May
6. 【dom-nyaen，六月】: June
7. 【tou-nyaen，七月】: July
8. 【ghou-nyaen，八月】: August
9. 【fauus-nyaen，九月】: September
10. 【fuet-nyaen，十月】: October
11. 【fuetceuus-nyaen，十一月】: November
12. 【fuethlaus-nyaen，十二月、腊月】: December

The other is following the Han's lunar calendar, e.g.,

- 【zuu-hwan-nyaen，初一】: the first day of a lunar month
- 【hlaus-hwan-nyaen，初二】: the second day of a lunar month
- 【fus-hwan-nyaen，初三】: the third day of a lunar month
- 【caus-hwan-nyaen，初四】: the fourth day of a lunar month
- ..........
- 【fuetceuus-hwan，十一日】: the 11th day of a lunar month
- 【fuetceuus-hwan，十二日】: the 12th day of a lunar month
- ..........
- 【hlausfuetceuus-hwan，二十一日】: the 21st day of a lunar month
- 【fusfuet-hwan，三十日】: the 30th day of a lunar month

=== Number of approximation ===
==== With sequential numbers ====
In Hlai language, one way to represent approximate numbers is to place two or three sequential numbers together, e.g.,

hlaus fus (hom)
two three (CL)
"two or three" (Chinese: 两三（个）)

tou ghou fauus (hom)
seven eight nine (CL)
"seven, eight, or nine" (Chinese: 七八九（个）)

Usually, the numbers one and two are not put together.

==== With "probably" ====
Another way to represent approximate numbers is to use the word "dzaengsloepp" (大约/大概，probably), e.g.,

dzaengsloepp zaux fuet dom hom
probably have ten six CL
"probably have sixteen (ones)" (Chinese: 大概有十六个)

The word "dzaengsloepp" also can be shortened to "loepp", e.g.,

loepp zaux tou fuet ceuus kuuengx
probably have seven ten one CL.tree
"probably have seventy-one (trees)" (Chinese: 大约有七十一棵)

==== With "more than" ====
Another way to represent approximate numbers is to use the word "dza" (余，a surplus/more than), e.g.,

hlaus dza hom
two surplus CL
"more than two (less than three)" (Chinese: 两个多)

fuet dza boux
ten surplus year
"more than ten years (less than twenty)" (Chinese: 十多年)

The word "dza" can also be used with "loepp" to represent approximate numbers. The construction is "loepp" + zaux + number + "dza", e.g.,

Na loepp zaux fuet dza boux da buuen he.
he probably have ten surplus year not come ACCENT
"He hasn't come (to this place) for more than ten years." (Chinese: 他大约有十余年没来了)

The word "zaux" in this construction can be omitted, e.g.,

Zuu hom as neix loepp fuet dza gins.
one CL watermelon this probably ten surplus {CL, about 500 g}
"This watermelon is a little more than 10 gins." (Chinese: 这个西瓜大约有十多斤)

==== Small amounts ====
There are some synonyms, like "zuugit", "zuugitgit", "zuugitlaei", that can be used to represent approximate numbers. These words indicate the uncertainty of a small amount, e.g.,

Na naus lax zuugit vi!
he just/only eat {a little bit} ACCENT
"He only ate a little bit." (Chinese: 他才吃一点点)

Hou zaux zuugitgit.
I have {a little bit}
"I have a little bit." (Chinese: 我有一点点)

bhinx zuugitlaei
lack {a little bit}
"lacks a little bit." (Chinese: 缺了一点点)

The word "zuutom" (一部分，a part/some) represents the uncertainty of a given amount, e.g.,

zuutom hei zuutom buuen
some go some come
"Some (people) go, some (people) come." (Chinese: 一部分（人）去，一部分（人）来)

paem na dhuus zuutom guen
meet he in part way
"meet him part way" (Chinese: 在半路上碰见他)

Sometimes, the word "zuutom" means "half", e.g.,

zuu pas zuutom
one CL.man half
"each one (gets) half" (Chinese: 一人一半)

Another word to represent the uncertainty of a given amount is "gei" (几, 若干, several), which implies the amount is less than ten, e.g.,

gei hwan neix
several day this
"these days" (Chinese: 这几天)

Mansnyoengx zaux gei zuen aeu buuen.
only have several CL man come
"Only a few people come (less than ten)" (Chinese: 只有几个人来)

==== Large amounts ====
The word "hloei" (多, many/much) can represent the uncertainty of a great amount; if the amount is even greater, this word, "hloei" is repeated, "hloeihloei", e.g.,

Bhous na hauux hloei duis dhat.
village he that many {water buffalo} very
"There are a lot of buffalo in his village." (Chinese: 他那个村牛很多)

Dhuix fa neix zaux uxaeu hloeihloei.
team we this have man {so many}
"We have so many people on this team." (Chinese: 我们这个队有许多人)

When a certain amount is requested, the word "hloeiras" (多少，how many/much) can be used in an interrogative sentence, e.g.,

Meuu boux neix hloeiras boux?
you year this {how many} year
"How old are you this year?" (Chinese: 你今年多大岁数？)

Meuu zaux hloeiras zuen hluuekghueng?
you have {how many} CL {younger sister or brother}
"How many younger brothers and sisters do you have?" (Chinese: 你有多少个弟弟妹妹？)

== Classifiers ==
=== Classifiers that modify nouns ===
==== Common classifiers ====
- 【hom，个、块、所、颗、粒、朵、元、座、盏、顶...】: most frequently used, and used with inanimate objects (including fruit, month, story, building, flower, money, mountain, light-stand, hat...), e.g.,
  zuu hom waeu
  one CL bowl
  "a bowl" (Chinese: 一个碗)
- 【zuen，位】: it is only used with humans, e.g.,
  hlaus zuen bhiengs
  two CL soldier
  "two soldiers" (Chinese: 两个士兵)
- 【laus，个、位】: it is only used with males whether a baby, child, boy or young man, e.g.,
  zuu laus hluuek
  one CL child
  "a boy" (Chinese: 一个男孩)
- 【hauus，个、位】: it is only used with females whether a baby, child, girl or young woman, e.g.,
  hlaus hauus hluuek
  two CL child
  "two girls" (Chinese: 两个女孩)
- 【lang，只】: it can be used with humans, animate objects and spiritual beings, e.g.,
  fus lang kai
  three CL chicken
  "three chickens" (Chinese: 三只鸡)
- 【kuuengx，棵】: it is used with larger plants (flowers use "hom"), e.g.,
  caus kuuengx cai
  four CL tree
  "four trees" (Chinese: 四棵树)
- 【fans，件】: it is used with shirts or blouses, e.g.,
  ba fans veengs
  five CL shirt/top
  "five shirts or blouses" (Chinese: 五件衣裳)
- 【hyax，条、件】: it is used with trousers/pants, e.g.,
  hlaus hyax kous
  two CL pants
  "two pairs of pants" (Chinese: 两条裤子)
- 【ruet，条】: it is used with skirts, e.g.,
  zuu ruet riens
  one CL {the traditional Hlai skirt}
  "a skirt" (Chinese: 一条筒裙)
- 【tos，套】: it is used with a suit of clothes or an outfit, e.g.,
  zuu tos veengs kous
  one CL shirt/top pants
  "a suit or outfit having a matching top and bottom" (Chinese: 一套衣服裤子)
- 【tut，套】: it is used with a suit or outfit of clothes, e.g.,
  zuu tut veengs
  one CL shirt/top
  "a suit of clothes" (Chinese: 一套衣服)
- 【dhanx，条、根】: it is used with linear objects, e.g.,
  zuu dhanx dhoei
  one CL rope
  "a rope" (Chinese: 一根绳子)
  dom dhanx noms
  six CL river
  "six rivers" (Chinese: 六条河)
- 【viens，块，张】: it is used with massive or planar objects, e.g.,
  tou viens noeng duis
  seven CL skin {water buffalo}
  "seven pieces of cow hides" (Chinese: 七张牛皮)
- 【rueis，块、张】: it is usually used with flat surfaced planar objects, e.g.,
  hlaus rueis aek bou
  two CL meat pig
  "two slabs of pork" (Chinese: 两块猪肉)
  fus rueis noeng loei
  three CL skin muntjak
  "three pieces of chamois (small antelope) hide" (Chinese: 三张麂子皮)
- 【ban，头、只】: it is used with cows or horses, e.g.,
  hlaus ban gas
  two CL horse
  "two horses" (Chinese: 两匹马)
- 【pous/paus，堆】: it is used with a relative smaller pile (pous/paus is also a verb), e.g.,
  zuu pous van
  one CL earth
  "a pile of earth" (Chinese: 一堆土)
- 【kun，堆】: it is used with a relative bigger pile, e.g.,，
  zuu kun muens
  one CL {rice in the husk}
  "a large pile of rice" (Chinese: 一大堆稻谷)
- 【baep，把】: it is usually used with seedling (There is no wheat on the Island of Hainan/Hlai people's territory.), e.g.,
  zuu baep fan
  one CL seedling
  "a handful of rice seedlings" (Chinese: 一把秧)
- 【hax，把】: it is usually used with rice, e.g.,，
  zuu hax muens
  one classifier rice
  "one handful of rice" (Chinese: 一把稻子)
- 【bhaeng，间】: it is usually used with a room or building, e.g.,
  zuu bhaeng blongs
  one CL house
  "a building/house" (Chinese: 一间屋子)
  zuu bhaeng qiafei
  one CL train
  "a box car" (Chinese: 一节火车厢)
- 【bhaengs，梭/颗、封】: it is usually used with letters (a written communication as one sent through the mail) a bullet or a firecracker, e.g.,
  zuu bhaengs veji
  one CL bullet
  "a bullet" (Chinese: 一梭/颗子弹)
  zuu bhaengs dienx
  one CL letter
  "a letter" (Chinese: 一封信)
- 【bhak，块】: it is usually used with flat objects, e.g.,
  zuu bhak gias
  one CL glass
  "a piece of glass" (Chinese: 一块玻璃)
  zuu bhak qias
  one CL paper
  "a piece of cardboard" (Chinese: 一块硬纸片)
- 【bheek，幅】: it is usually used with a picture or painting, e.g.,
  zuu bheek ueix
  one CL picture/painting
  "a picture/painting" (Chinese: 一幅画)
- 【bhuek，把】: it is usually used with straw, e.g.,
  zuu bhueks ngwiengs
  one CL straw
  "a handful of straw" (Chinese: 一把稻草)
- 【bhui，本】: it is usually used with books, e.g.,
  hlaus bhui qias
  two CL book
  "two books" (Chinese: 两本书)
- 【cax，座】: it is usually used with mountains, e.g.,
  zuu cax hwous
  one CL mountain
  "a mountain" (Chinese: 一座山)
- 【ceuus，枝、秆】: it is usually used with a pen or stick, e.g.,
  zuu ceuus bhit
  one CL pen
  "a pen" (Chinese: 一支笔)
- 【cueng，枚】: it is usually used with a needle, e.g.,
  zuu cueng guty
  one CL needle
  "a needle" (Chinese: 一枚针)
- 【dhien，畦or 幅】: it is usually used with farmland (rectangular plots of land in a field, separated by ridges, usually for growing vegetables), also used with cloth, e.g.,
  zuu dhien van bheuudaeis
  one CL land/earth vegetables
  "a bed of vegetables" (Chinese: 一畦菜地)
  zuu dhien dhop
  one CL cloth
  "a piece of cloth" (Chinese: 一幅布)
- 【dhun，户、家】: it is usually used with households, e.g.,
  bhous fa zaux hlaus fuet dhun blongs.
  Village our have two ten CL households
  "There are twenty households in our village." (Chinese: 我们村子有二十户人家)
- 【gas，辆、架】: it is usually used with a car or a plane, e.g.,
  zuu gas qia
  one CL car
  "a car" (Chinese: 一辆车)
  zuu gas vabheny
  one CL airplane
  "an airplane" (Chinese: 一架飞机)
- 【ghoeix，行、排】: a row, a line, e.g.,
  fus ghoeix cai
  three CL tree
  "three rows of trees" (Chinese: 三行树)
  zuu ghoeix qias
  one CL word/letter
  "one line of words" (Chinese: 一行字)
- 【ha，缕】: it is usually used with light.
- 【hus，副】: it is usually used with playing cards, poker.
- 【hwoens，堆、块】: it is usually used with fields or objects that can be organized in a pile, e.g.,
  zuu hwoens guns
  one CL firewood
  "a pile of firewood" (Chinese: 一堆柴火)
  zuu hwoens dax
  one CL field
  "a field" (Chinese: 一块水田)
- 【hluut，层】: it means "layers" or "levels", e.g.,
  fus hluut laeus
  three CL {the floor in building}
  "three floors" (Chinese: 三层楼)
  Van neix zaux fus hluut na.
  Land this have three CL thickness
  "This soil has three layers." (Chinese: 这土有三层厚)
- 【ka，枝】: it is usually used with branches, e.g.,
  zuu ka cai
  one CL tree
  "a branch" (Chinese: 一枝树枝)
- 【kok，棵】: it is usually used with mushrooms, e.g.,
  zuu kok dhety
  one CL mushroom
  "a mushroom" (Chinese: 一棵菌子)
- 【koen，只】: it is usually used with one object in a pair, e.g.,
  zuu kuen zuugoems
  one CL shoe
  "a shoe" (Chinese: 一只鞋)
  zuu koen fiek
  one CL CL
  "a pole balanced on a shoulder by half a load being carried in the front and the other half being carried in the back" (Chinese: 半挑东西)
  (fiek: the action of carrying stuff on a shoulder becomes a classifier)
- 【kou，张、顶】: it is usually used with mesh, e.g.,
  zuu kou ghoeis hla
  one CL net fish
  "a fishing net" (Chinese: 一张鱼网)
- 【liemx，瓣】: it is usually used with a clove or segment of fruit, e.g.,
  zuu liemx coembhem
  one CL grapefruit
  "a piece of grapefruit" (Chinese: 一瓣柚子)
- 【leep，叠】: it is usually used with thin objects like paper, e.g.,
  hlaus leep qias
  two CL paper
  "two sheets of paper" (Chinese: 两层纸)
- 【leeps，瓣、片、层】: it is usually used with thin objects
- 【luuengs，把】: it is usually used with a saw (tool for sawing)
- 【moux，种、类】: it means a "kind, sort", e.g.,
  neix zuu moux hleny
  This one CL good
  "This is a good one." (Chinese: 这一种好)
  zaux hlenyhloei moux muens
  have many CL rice
  "There are many kinds of rice." (Chinese: 有好多种稻子)
- 【paeng，串】: it is usually used with fruit, e.g.,
  zuu paeng zuuloengs
  one CL {betel nut}
  "a cluster of betel nut" (Chinese: 一串槟榔)
- 【pienx，把】: it is usually used with knives e.g.,
  zuu pienx gas
  one CL knife
  "a knife" (Chinese: 一把刀)
- 【puens，杆、根】: it is usually used with tree trunks or any bar-like or rod-like objects, e.g.,
  zuu puens cai
  one CL tree
  "a stump (or tree trunk)" (Chinese: 一根树干)
  zuu puens bhit
  one CL pen
  "a pen" (Chinese: 一支笔)
- 【raeis，块、片】: it is used with fields, e.g.,
  zuu raeis dax
  one CL field
  "a field" (Chinese: 一片田)
- 【ras，棵，株】: it is usually used with grass or rice, e.g.,
  zuu ras gans
  one CL grass
  "a blade of grass" (Chinese: 一棵草)
- 【rok，块】: it is usually used with hillside fields (fields far from a water source), e.g.,
  zuu rok ang
  one CL field
  "a field" (Chinese: 一块刀耕地)
  (ang: specifically, a burned up plot of land that is fertilized for future farming by the remaining ashes; an ancient farming way of Hlai people, but now forbidden by the CN government)
  fus rok pos
  three CL {hillside field}
  "three fields on the hillside" (Chinese: 三块旱地)
- 【ruets，摞】: it is usually used with massive objects
- 【taeu，批、群】: it is usually used with a batch of goods or a group of animals, e.g.,
  caty zuu taeu liem
  buy one CL sickle
  "buy a bundle of sickles" (Chinese: 买一批镰刀)
  zuu taeu dzeeng
  one CL goat/sheep
  "a flock of goats" (Chinese: 一群羊)
- 【tuueng，把】: it is usually used with farm tools, e.g.,
  zuu tuueng rik
  one CL rake
  "a rake" (Chinese: 一把耙)
- 【vaen，梳、下】: it is usually used with comb-like, comb-shaped objects, e.g.,
  zuu vaen hweek
  one CL banana
  "a bunch of bananas" (Chinese: 一梳芭蕉)
  or it is used for counting the number of times of pestling, e.g.,
  ceek fuet vaen
  pestle ten CL
  "pestle ten times" (Chinese: 舂十下)
- 【vans，张、页、幅、块】: it is usually used with paper products, e.g.,
  zuu vans qia
  one CL paper
  "a piece of paper" (Chinese: 一张纸)
  zuu vans diets
  one CL picture
  "a photograph" (Chinese: 一幅照片)
- 【voei，桶】: it is usually used with something that can be carried in a bucket, e.g.,
  zuu voei ghei
  one CL rice
  "a bucket of rice" (Chinese: 一桶米)
- 【vong，嘟噜】: it is usually used with something formed as a cluster (tropical fruit is usually in clusters, such as coconuts, betel nuts), e.g.,
  zuu vong coemcai
  one CL fruit
  "a cluster of fruit" (Chinese: 一嘟噜果子)

==== Classifiers for measurement ====
- 【mous，亩】: (Chinese acre) a unit of area to measure a land or field, about 667 square meters, e.g.,
  zuu mous dax
  one CL field
  "one mu of field" (Chinese: 一亩田)
- 【dho，丈】: a unit of length to measure the length of linear objects, 1 dho is about 350 centimeters, e.g.
  zuu dho dhop
  one CL {cloth or textile}
  "one zhang of cloth" (Chinese: 一丈布)
- 【qieux，尺】: a unit of length to measure the length of linear objects, 1 qieux is about 35 centimeters, 10 qieux = 1 dho.
  hlaus qieux dhop
  two CL {cloth or textile}
  "two feet of cloth" (Chinese: 两尺布)
- 【cuns，寸】: a unit of length to measure the length of linear objects, about 3.5 cm, 10 cuns = 1 qieux.
  fus cuns dhop
  three CL {cloth or textile}
  "three inches of cloth" (Chinese: 三寸布)
- 【hlaenx，庹】: the length of two arms, about the height of a person, about 5–6 feet.
- 【hwuup，拃】: the distance between the thumb and the middle finger pressed down on a surface in a straight line, about 15–20 centimeters, e.g.,
  zuu hwuup daeus
  one CL length
  "one zuo length" (Chinese: 一拃长)
- 【tunx，节】: the length of a finger, about 6–9 centimeters.
- 【dhas，石】: a unit of weight, e.g., fuetdhas ghei (fuet: ten, ghei: uncooked rice). 1 dhas is probably equal to 150 gins, about 75 kg.
- 【dhaeu，斗】: a unit of weight, e.g., zuu dhaeu ghei (zuu: one, ghei: uncooked rice). 10 dhaeu = 1 dhas; 1 dhaeu = 10 kax = 15 gins, about 7.5 kg.
- 【kax，升】: a unit of weight, e.g., fus kax ghei (fus: three, ghei: uncooked rice). 1 kax = 1.5 gins, about 0.75 kg.
- 【gins，斤】: a unit of weight, e.g., zuu gins hla (zuu: one, hla: fish). 1 gins = 16 luuengx; 1 gins = 0.5 kg.
- 【luuengx，两】: a unit of weight, e.g., zuu luuengxnyaeus (zuu: one, nyaeus: salt). 1 gins = 16 luuengx; 1 gins = 500 g; so 1luuengx = 31.25 g
- 【dhun，吨】: a modern unit of weight, 1000 kg, e.g., fauus dhun ghoei, "a ton of iron (fauus: nine, ghoei: iron)."

==== Classifiers derived from nouns or verbs ====
- 【kop，捧 or 把】: the original action of holding or carrying something in both hands becomes a measurement, e.g.,
  zuu kop ghei
  one CL rice
  "one scoop of rice" (Chinese: 一捧米)
- 【koens，捆】: the original action of tying, binding or bundling up becomes a measurement, e.g.,
  zuu koens hya
  one CL {thatch or couch grass}
  "a sheaf of thatch" (Chinese: 一捆茅草)
- 【bhiek，捆】: it is usually used with a bundle of objects that is carried on one's shoulders, e.g.,
  zuu bhiek guns
  one CL firewood/sticks
  "a bundle of firewood/sticks" (Chinese: 一捆柴)
- 【zeems，撮】: the original action of picking up (with all five fingers) becomes a measurement, e.g.,
  zuu zeems nyaeus
  one CL salt
  "one pinch (using all five fingers) of salt." (Chinese: 一撮盐)
- 【jims，撮】: the original action of picking up (with the thumb and forefinger/index finger) becomes a measurement, e.g.,
  jims zuugit nyaeus
  {pick up} {a little of} salt
  "a pinch (using only two fingers) of salt" (Chinese: 拈一点盐)
  hlaus jims nyaeus
  two CL salt
  "two pinches of salt" (Chinese: 两撮盐)
- 【fiek，担or 双】: the original action of carrying a pole (usually bamboo-made) on a shoulder that is used for measurements becomes a measurement for things that were carried on poles, e.g.,
  zuu fiek guns
  one CL firewood
  "a bundle of firewood" (Chinese: 一担柴)
  zuu fiek zuugoems
  one CL shoe
  "a pair of shoes" (Chinese: 一双鞋)
- 【gok，杯、瓶】: a cup (or a bottle), originally a noun, becomes a classifier, e.g.,
  zuu gok noms
  one CL water
  "a cup of water" (Chinese: 一杯水)
  zuu gok ghweis
  one CL oil
  "a bottle of oil" (Chinese: 一瓶油)
- 【waeu，碗】: a bowl, originally a noun, becomes a classifier, e.g.,
  zuu waeu tax
  one CL {cooked rice}
  "a bowl of rice" (Chinese: 一碗饭)
- 【boux/baux，岁】: a year, originally a noun, becomes a classifier, e.g.,
  zuu fuet ghou boux
  one ten eight CL
  "18 years old" (Chinese: 十八岁)
- 【bhaem，围】: the original action of embracing something with two arms becomes a measurement, e.g.,
  hlaus blaem cai
  two CL tree
  "tree size of two men's arms wrapped around it" (Chinese: 两围的树)
- 【comx，袋】: usually, objects that can be carried in bags that have become classifiers, e.g.,
  zuu comx ghei
  one CL rice
  "a bag of rice" (Chinese: 一袋米)
- 【ding，升】: a barrel (made of coconut shells), originally a noun, becomes a measurement, e.g.,
  zuu ding ghei
  one CL rice
  "a barrel of rice" (Chinese: 一升米)
- 【dhak，滴】: the original action is dripping; the meaning is "a drop", used as a classifier, e.g.,
  zuu dhak noms
  one CL water
  "a drop of water" (Chinese: 一滴水)
- 【dzuen，挂】: the stalk bananas grow on, originally a noun, becomes a classifier, e.g.,
  zuu dzuen hweek
  one CL banana
  "a stalk of bananas" (Chinese: 一大挂芭蕉)
- 【fas，阵】: as a noun it means sky, but it can also be used as a classifier, e.g.,
  zuu fas fun
  one CL rain/shower
  "a (rain) shower" (Chinese: 一阵雨)
- 【fiens，把】: as a noun it is the handle of farm tools, but it can also be used as a classifier, e.g.,
  zuu fiens gwaek
  one CL hoe
  "a hoe" (Chinese: 一把锄头)
- 【fok，块】: as a noun it is a place, area, or region, but it can also be used as a classifier, e.g.,
  zuu fok gom neix
  one CL region this
  "this region" (Chinese: 这块地方)
- 【gieps，夹】: the original action is sheaving the thatch, but it can also be used as a classifier, e.g.,
  hlaus gieps hya
  two CL thatch
  "two sheaves of thatch" (Chinese: 两夹茅草)
- 【guengs，篮、框】: a basket, originally a noun, becomes a classifier, e.g.,
  zuu guengs ghei
  one classifier hoe
  "a basket of rice" (Chinese: 一筐米)
- 【guety，串】: a stick for threading some objects together, originally a noun, becomes a classifier, e.g.,
  zuu guety hla
  one CL fish
  "a string of fish" (Chinese: 一串鱼)
- 【neny，串】: a bamboo stick for threading some objects together, originally a noun, becomes a classifier, e.g.,
  zuu neny hla
  one CL fish
  "a string of fish" (Chinese: 一串鱼)
- 【neny，枝】: as a noun it means a little branch, but it can also be used as a classifier with a branch or flower, e.g.,
  zuu neny ceeng
  one CL flower
  "a flower" (Chinese: 一枝花)
- 【ghongs，丛】: as a noun it means a grove, but it can also be used as a classifier, e.g.,
  zuu ghongs hweek
  one CL banana
  "a grove of banana trees" (Chinese: 一丛芭蕉树)
- 【hoep，盒】: as a noun it means a box, but it can also be used as a classifier, e.g.,
  zuu hoep cuax
  one CL matches
  "a box of matches" (Chinese: 一盒火柴)
- 【hwang，圈】: as a noun it means a ring, ferrule, or band, but it can also be used as a classifier, e.g.,
  zuu hwang zuu hwang noms
  one CL one CL water
  "a ripple (of water)" (Chinese: 一圈一圈的水)
- 【hwaeng，垄】: as a noun it means a balk, that is to be heaped up with soil into ridges, e.g.,
  zuu hwaeng man
  one CL {a general term for potato}
  "a ridge of sweet potatoes" (Chinese: 一垄甘薯)
- 【hwoens，丘、床】: as a noun it means something lined up forming a pattern, e.g.,
  zuu hwoen dax
  one CL field
  "a field" (Chinese: 一丘田)
  zuu hyoen haeus
  one CL quilt
  "a quilt" (Chinese: 一床被子)
- 【op，抱】: the original action is holding a baby, e.g.,
  zuu op guns
  one CL firewood
  "an armful of firewood" (Chinese: 一抱柴火)
- 【puuen，代】: as a noun it means seniority in respect to age, and as a classifier it means "generations," e.g.,
  fa buuen neix bhaeis zaux fus puuen bhe
  We come here already have three CL ACCENT
  "We've been here for three generations." (Chinese: 我们来这儿已有三代了)
- 【rei，枝】: as a noun it means sprouts, and as a classifier it is used with sprouts.
- 【ruek，窝、笼、盒】: as a noun it means nest, cage, or box, and it can be used as a classifier, e.g.,
  zuu ruek bou
  one CL pig/hug
  "a litter of pigs" (Chinese: 一窝猪)
  zuu ruek kai
  one CL chicken
  "a cage of chickens" (Chinese: 一笼鸡)
  zuu ruek aenx
  one CL cake
  "a box of cakes" (Chinese: 一盒点心)
  Sometimes, it is also used with urine, e.g.,
  zuu ruek dhou
  one CL urine
  "a stream of urine" (Chinese: 一泡尿)
- 【taen，场、趟】: as a noun it means altar (usually for worship of the demons or the ancestors), but it can also be used as a classifier, e.g.,
  bhaeis vuek zuu taen dings.
  Already do one CL demon
  "(The priest) already sacrificed once to the demons." (Chinese: 已经祭了一趟鬼)
- 【taeng，桶】: a bucket, originally a noun, becomes a classifier, e.g.,
  zuu taeng noms
  one CL water
  "a bucket of water" (Chinese: 一桶水)
- 【tiep，夹】: the original action is picking up food up with chopsticks, but as a noun it means chopsticks, which can be used as a classifier referring to the food amount that is taken up with a pinch of the chopsticks, e.g.,
  zuu tiep bheuucai
  one CL vegetable
  "a chopstick-pinch of food" (Chinese: 一夹菜)
- 【tuck，包】: the original action is to wrap up; bind up; enclose; pack, but it can also be used as a classifier, e.g.,
  zuu tuek dza
  one CL cigarettes
  "a pack of cigarettes" (Chinese: 一包烟)
- 【veeng，户】: as a noun it means lord or master, and as a classifier it can be used with households, e.g.,
  zuu veeng
  one CL
  "a household" (Chinese: 一户(人家))
- 【zaemx，步】: as a noun it means step, and the verb is stepping or walking, but it can also be used as a classifier, e.g.,
  zuu ghwaen zaemx
  one hundred CL
  "one hundred steps" (Chinese: 一百步)
- 【zeeng，穗、粒】: as a noun it means kernels (husks) of rice, but it can also be a classifier to mean the husks from a stalk of rice or something with larger kernels, e.g.,
  zuu zeeng muens
  one CL rice
  "a stalk of rice" (Chinese: 一穗稻子)
  zuu zeeng nyaeus
  one CL salt
  "a grain of coarse salt" (Chinese: 一粒粗盐)

=== Classifiers for modifying verbs ===
- 【faei，下、次、回】: time, e.g.,
  taeix zuu faei
  hit/beat one CL
  "to hit/beat once" (Chinese: 打一下)
- 【gaeis，回、次、遍】: time, e.g.,
  na bhaeis rien hlaus gaeis
  he/she already say/speak two CL
  "He already said (it) two times." (Chinese: 他已经说了两遍了)
- 【guen，趟、遍】: time, e.g.,
  hei zuu guen
  go one CL
  "go (there) one time" (Chinese: 去一次)
- 【caety，阵、遍】: it is usually used by women, it means "time", e.g.,
  bhaeis fun zuu caety
  Already rain one CL
  "It already showered." (Chinese: 下了一阵雨)
  kai bhaeis hyoen fus caety
  Chicken already {cock crow} three CL
  "The chicken has already crowed three times." (Chinese: 鸡已叫了三遍)
- 【pienx，遍】: time, e.g.,
  tak zuu pienx
  study one CL
  "read one time" (Chinese: 读一遍)
- 【caeu，阵】: it is usually used by the elderly, it means "time", e.g.,
  zuu caeu fun
  one CL rain
  "a shower (describing rain)" (Chinese: 一阵雨)
  zuu caeu hwoet
  one CL wind
  "a gust of wind" (Chinese: 一阵风)
- 【caens，顿】: classifier for meal, e.g.,
  zuu caens tax
  one CL rice
  "a meal" (Chinese: 一顿饭)
- 【kok，脚】: feet, e.g.,
  teeks zuu kok
  kick one CL
  "give (it) a kick" (Chinese: 踢一脚)
- 【boms，口】: mouth, e.g.,
  gaenys zuu boms
  bite one CL
  "to take a bite" (Chinese: 咬一口)
- 【feek，口or 句】: mouth, e.g.,
  lax zuu feek tax
  eat one CL rice
  "to take a bite of food" (Chinese: 吃一口饭)
  na zuu feek tun ruus da rien
  he/she one CL word even not say
  "He did not even say a word." (Chinese: 他一句话也不说)
- 【pui，阵、遍】: it means "time" and is used to count sleep, e.g.,
  gaux zuu pui
  sleep one CL
  "time spent in rest/sleep" (Chinese: 睡一觉)

=== Basic rules for classifiers ===
Classifiers cannot be doubled as AA (e.g., lang lang), but can be used in an AB+AB pattern, e.g.,

Daty zuu kun zuu kun bheny.
bird one CL one CL fly
"Birds fly in groups." (Chinese: 鸟成群成群地飞)

Classifiers cannot modify nouns alone; classifiers and numbers must be used together to modify nouns, e.g.,

Zuu lang ba neix long dhat!
one CL dog this big really/truly
"This dog is really big!" (Chinese: 这只狗真大！)

Classifiers (for modifying verbs) and numbers must be used together and be placed after the verb as a complement; in some regions, the combination (number+classifier) would be placed before the verb, e.g.,

Raux fus gaeis = Fus gaeis raux
{read aloud} three CL = three CL read
"read three times" (Chinese: 读三遍)

In some occasions, the combination of numbers and classifiers exists alone, whereby they are not modifying any nouns or verbs, e.g.,

Hou caty zuu hom, meuu ngan caty zuu hom.
I buy one CL you also buy one CL
"I buy one, and you buy one." (Chinese: 我买一个，你也买一个)

== Pronouns ==
There are three kinds of pronouns: the personal pronoun, demonstrative pronoun, and interrogative pronoun.

=== Personal pronouns ===
	singular	plural
1st person	hou, "我" (polite) dhes, "我" (casual)	fa, "我们" (exclusive) gha, "咱们" (inclusive)
2nd person	meuu, "你"	meuuda, "你们"
3rd person	na, "他/她/它"	kun, "他们" kunaeu, "他们"

The different usage of "hou" and "dhes":

1. The women prefer to use "hou" when women talk to women, or women to men. They prefer to use "hou" in order to express themselves as a humble woman and to show respect to their listeners.
2. When a senior member of the family (an elderly, parents, older brothers or sisters...etc.) is angry with a junior, he/she could choose to use "hou" or "dhes"; on the contrary, juniors are forbidden to use "dhes" when speaking with the seniors in conversation, or when they are angry at them.
3. Among blood relatives, when men speak to women, they use "hou"; when men speak to men, either "hou" or "dhes" can be used; when juniors speak to a senior, they usually use "hou".
4. Among in-laws, no matter whether men, women, seniors, or juniors, when they speak to each other, the word "hou" is preferable to express politeness.
5. Between hosts and guests, no matter the gender or age, the word "hou" must be used to express politeness and respect.
6. When someone asks a who question, "Asras…?" If it is answered with the first personal pronoun, "hou" is preferable over "dhes", e.g.,
  Q: Asras dhuus hauux? A: Hou res!
  Q‍: Who is there? A‍: I ACCENT
  Q: Who is there? A: (It's) I. (Chinese: Q: 谁在那里？A: 我呀！)
  1. If someone answers with the word "dhes", it expresses his impatient attitude. Usually, it occurs between family members' conversations, e.g.,
    Q: Asras dhuus hauux? A: Dhes vi! Asras?
    Q‍: Who is there? A‍: Me ACCENT Who?
    "Q: Who is there? A: (It's) I! Who else?" (Chinese: Q: 谁在那里？A: 我嘛！还有谁？)
  2. When a man sings to a woman to express his love to her, he will definitely use "hou"; if he uses "dhes", she would think he is not sincere, e.g.,
    Tuuen dhang duuengx hou nga; tuuen ca duuengx hou laeis
    {Go out} face give me look {go out} eye give me see
    "Let me see your face; let me look into your eyes." (Chinese: 露脸给我瞧；露眼睛给我见)
7. When someone speaks rudely, he uses "dhes" instead of "hou".
8. In today's Hlai society, the difference between "hou" and "dhes" is not so strict. Generally, women mostly use "hou"; men usually use "dhes". The word "hou" expresses politeness and respect to the listener, and the word "dhes" is more casual.

P.S. My language consultant said: the word "kun" is a simplified form of "kunaeu". Usually, in a conversation held between those of the same gender group, "kun" is used; in a conversation held between those of different gender groups, "kunaeu" would be used to show respect. Or, if a conversation were made up of those from both the older and younger generation, the younger generation would need to use "kunaeu" to show respect toward the elderly.

	Singular 单数	Plural 复数
Reflexive pronouns 反身代名词	paszauus, "自己, self" (男性用, man/male use); zuenzauus, "自己, self" (女性用, woman/female use); veengzauus, "自己, self" (通用, general use) goemzauus, "自己, self" (委婉, polite use)	
General pronouns 泛称代名词	uengxtoengs, "大家, everyone"; aeu, "人家, people"; himax, "某人, someone"; aeu uughwaix, "别人, others"	

Personal pronouns can be both a subject and an object, e.g.,

Na taeix hluuek daty.
he hit child bird
"He hit the little bird." (Chinese: 他打小鸟)

dheuu toencai taeix na
take stick hit him
"take a stick to hit him" (Chinese: 拿木棍打他)

Personal pronouns can also act as an attribute to indicate the possessive relation, e.g.,

Gha vou tun na hei vuek.
we follow words his to do
"Let's follow his words to do (it)." (Chinese: 咱们按照他的话去做)

Reflexive pronouns can be an appositive to another pronoun to emphasize the pronoun, e.g.,

Neix man hou zuenzauus vuek.
this is I self do
"I made it myself." (Chinese: 这是我自己做的)

The auxiliary word "guu" can be placed before a personal pronoun to indicate the possessive relation. After placing the word "guu", the pronoun cannot be a subject, an object, nor an attribute, but only a predicate, e.g.,

Neix zuu lang kai man {guu na.}
this one CLF chicken is his
"This chicken is his." (Chinese: 这一只鸡是他的)

Blongs neix man {guu dhes.}
house this is mine
"This house is mine." (Chinese: 这房子是我的)

=== Demonstrative pronouns ===
- 【neix，这】: this; here; so; such
- 【hauux，那】: that; there; so; such
- 【max，那】: that; there

The word "neix" refers to someone, or something, at a close distance; the word "hauux" is farther away than the word "neix"; the word "max" is even farther. These three words also can be combined to the words "dhong" or "hi" and become compound words as below,

- 【dhongneix，这】: like this
- 【dhonghauux，那】: like that
- 【hineix，这】: such
- 【hihauux，那】: like that

Other demonstrative pronouns are:

- 【uughwaix，别的】: other
- 【ranx，每】: every

When a demonstrative pronoun acts as a subject, it is placed before the head word, e.g.,

Neix veengs baen.
this shirt/top new
"This (is) a new dress." (Chinese: 这是新的衣服)

Hauux duis long.
that {water buffalo} big
"That (is) a big buffalo." (Chinese: 那是大水牛)

When a demonstrative pronoun combines with a number, a classifier, and a noun to form a noun phrase, the demonstrative pronoun acts as an attribute, e.g.,

Hauux zuu kuuengx cai hleny baisias.
that one CLF tree good very
"That tree is very good." (Chinese: 那一棵树好得很)

When a demonstrative pronoun acts as an attribute in a noun phrase, it can be placed either in the beginning or at the end of the noun phrase, e.g.,

Neix zuu lang kai ghweis.
this one CLF chicken fat
"This chicken is fat." (Chinese: 这一只鸡肥)

Zuu lang kai neix ghweis.
one CLF chicken this fat
"This chicken is fat." (Chinese: 这一只鸡肥)

If the linking verb is placed between the demonstrative pronoun and the noun, the demonstrative pronoun acts as a subject, e.g.,

Neix man hlaus lang kai enyx.
this are two CLF chicken little
"These are two chicks." (Chinese: 这是两只小鸡)

The words "neix", "hauux", and "max" can be a subject, an attribute, an adverbial, and an object; the word "uughwaix" can be a subject, an attribute, and an object; the compound words "dhongneix", "dhonghauux", "hineix", and "hihauux" can be a subject, an attribute, an adverbial, and a predicate, e.g.,

Dhongneix vuek yos?
{like this} do Q
"Is it done like this?" (Chinese: 这样做吗？)

Gong dhongneix hleny yos?
stuff {like this} good Q
"Is such a thing as this good?" (Chinese: 这样的东西好吗？)

Yous rien dhonghauux.
don't say {like that}
"Don't say that." (Chinese: 别那样说)

Meuu dhonghauux yos.
you {like that} Q
"Are you like that?" (Chinese: 你是那样的吗？)

There is no declension in demonstrative pronouns to indicate singular or plural. So, the demonstrative pronouns need to go with the number and classifier, or the word "zuugit" to indicate singular or plural, e.g.,

Zuu kun daty hauux bheny he.
one CLF bird that fly ACCENT
"The flock of birds (is) flying away." (Chinese: 那一群鸟飞了)

Zuugit ghei neix ghei uuras?
some rice this rice whose
"Whose rice is this?" (Chinese: 这些米是谁的？)

When the demonstrative pronoun acts as an attribute, it is usually placed after the head word, e.g.,

Buuemx neix long.
shrimp this big
"This shrimp is big." (Chinese: 这只虾大)

Na qieus hloei neix.
he take many/much so/such
"He took so much." (Chinese: 他拿这么多)

Meuu dheuu raux hauux.
you take/want little/few so/such
"You took/want so little." (Chinese: 你要这么少)

When the demonstrative pronoun is placed after the personal pronoun, or the interrogative pronoun, the demonstrative pronoun loses its meaning, and becomes an empty word that functions as an emphasis to make it sound fluent, e.g.,

Meuu neix kweis dheuu gong meshes?
you {empty word} want take stuff what
"What are you going to take?" (Chinese: 你要拿什么东西？)

Uuras hauux gongx hou?
who {empty word} {look for} me
"Who is looking for me?" (Chinese: 谁找我？)

The demonstrative pronoun "ranx" is only placed before the classifier, and can be doubled for emphasis, e.g.,

Ranx zuen lax zuu hom.
every CLF eat one CLF
"Everyone eats one." (Chinese: 每个人吃一个)

Ranx ranx zuen uuaeu ruus lax zuu hom.
every every CLF man all eat one CLF
"Everyone eats one." (Chinese: 每一个人都吃一个)

The demonstrative pronoun "uughwaix" can be an attribute and an object, e.g.,

gong uughwaix
stuff other
"other stuff" (Chinese: 别的东西)

aeu uughwaix
man other
"other's" (Chinese: 别的东西)

Zaux uughwaix cas da?
have other or not
"Do (you) have (any) other stuff?" (Chinese: 有别的没有？)

=== Interrogative pronouns ===
- 【ras，哪，如何】: Where? Which? How?
- 【uuras/asras，谁】: Who?
- 【dhongras，怎样】: How?
- 【qiras，何时】: When? What time?
- 【hloeiras，多少】: How much? How many?
- 【meshes，什么】: What?
- others

The interrogative word "uuras" ("asras") can be a subject, an attribute, or an object, e.g.,

Uuras gongx hou?
who? {look for} me
"Who is looking for me?" (Chinese: 谁找我？)

Meuu laeis uuras?
you see who?
"Who do you see?" (Chinese: 你看见谁？)

Na buuen blongs uuras?
he come house who?
"Whose house is he coming to?" (Chinese: 他来谁的家？)

Just like personal pronouns, when the auxiliary word "guu" is placed before an interrogative pronoun, it indicates a possessive relation, and the interrogative pronoun cannot be a subject, an object, nor an attribute, but only a predicate, e.g.,

Nyiu max man {guu uuras}?
cow that is whose?
"Whose cow is that?" (Chinese: 那黄牛是谁的？)

Veengs neix man {guu uuras}?
shirt/top this is whose?
"Whose shirt/top is this?" (Chinese: 这衣服是谁的？)

The interrogative word "meshes" cannot be a subject, only an attribute or an object, e.g.,

Gong meshes vaeu hleny?
stuff what most good
"What is the best stuff?" (Chinese: 什么东西最好？)

Na kweis dheuu meshes?
he want take what
"What does he want to take?" (Chinese: 他要拿什么？)

The interrogative word "ras" cannot be a subject, only an attribute, an adverbial or an object., e.g.,

Na dhuus ras?
he exist where?
"Where is he?" (Chinese: 他在哪里？)

When the word "ras" acts as an attribute, it is usually used with a number and clasiifier, and is placed before a noun, e.g.,

Ras zuu hom blongs vaeu long?
which one CLF house most big
"Which house is the biggest one?" (Chinese: 哪一个房子最大？)

When the word "ras" acts as an adverb, it is usually placed after the adjective, e.g.,

Coem neix long ras?
fruit this big how
"How big is this fruit?" (Chinese: 这果子有多大？)

The interrogative word "dhongras" usually acts as an adverbial, and is most often is placed before a verb, but sometimes it can be placed after a verb, e.g.,

Dhongras lax ngan da bhaeis.
How eat also not finish
"There is more food than we can eat." (Chinese: 怎么吃也吃不完)

Ang neix ghwa dhongras?
{hilly field} this plant how?
"How is this hilly field to be planted?" (Chinese: 这山栏地怎样种？)

The interrogative word "qiras" most often acts as an adverbial, and must be placed before the verb, e.g.,

Meuu qiras hei qix?
you when go street
"When are you heading out for the streets (to buy something)?" (Chinese: 你什么时候上街？)

Na qiras beuubuuen ohyaeu?
he when {go back} school
"When is he going back to school?" (Chinese: 他什么时候返校？)

The interrogative word "hloeiras" most often acts as an object, e.g.,

Meuu zaux hloeiras, hou dheuu hloeiras.
you have {how many} I take {how many}
"However many you have, I will take them." (Chinese: 你有多少，我要多少)

== Adverbs ==
=== Negation ===
- 【da，不】: not
- 【yous，不要，别】: Do not
- others

These adverbs modify verbs or adjectives, and usually are placed before the verbs or adjectives, e.g.,

Hansneix na da hei.
now he/she not go
"Today he won't go." (Chinese: 今天他不去)

Gong neix reek he, yous lax.
stuff this bad ACCENT don't eat
"This stuff (is) bad, don't eat (it)!" (Chinese: 这东西坏了，别吃！)

When the adverb "da" modifies verbs or adjectives, and "zo", an accentuated emphatic particle, is placed at the end of the sentence, "da" means "not yet", e.g.,

Na da buuen.
he/she not come
"He won't come." (Chinese: 他不来)

Na da buuen zo
he/she not come ACCENT
"He hasn't come yet!" (Chinese: 他还没来呢)

When the adverb "da" is placed at the end of a sentence, then the word "da" signals a question, e.g.,

Meuu zaux kius da?
you have ball Q
"Do you have a ball?" (Chinese: 你有球吗？)

=== Degree ===
- 【veau，最】: for expressing superlative degree
- 【duix，最】: for expressing superlative degree (this is a loan word)
- 【zangs，太】: too
- 【nguenxges，更加】: more, even more (this is a loan word)
- 【loeppvaix，恰恰，相当】: just right, just enough, exactly
- 【dhat，很】: very
- 【baisias，很，极，非常】: very much
- others

These adverbs are usually placed before the adjectives to modify them, e.g.,

vaeu reek
most bad
"worst" (Chinese: 最坏)

zangs fous
too hot
"too hot" (Chinese: 太热)

nguenxges hleny
even good
"even better" (Chinese: 更好)

loeppvaix hleny
exactly good
"just right" (Chinese: 恰恰好)

But, the adverbs "dhat" and "baisias" are placed after the adjectives. These two words also can modify verbs, e.g.,

kaeix dhat
cold very
"very cold" (Chinese: 很冷)

dzuuns baisias
quick {very much}
"very quick" (Chinese: 非常快)

To increase the degree of something, two different adverbs can modify the same term, e.g.,

vaeu dzuuns baisias
most quick {very much}
"Very, very (extremely) quick" (Chinese: 快极了)

The word "dhat" can be doubled to increase the degree, e.g.,

Veengs neix hleny dhatdhat.
shirt/top this good {very much}
"This shirt/top is a very good one." (Chinese: 这件衣服非常好)

=== Scope, extent, or range ===
- 【ruus，都】: all
- 【ngan，也，都】: also, all
- 【nyoengx，仅，只】: only
- 【mans，仅，只】: only
- others

These adverbs are usually placed before the verbs to modify them, e.g.,

Uengxtoengs ruus qim.
everyone all believe
"Everyone believes that." (Chinese: 大家都相信)

Hou ngan vuek.
I also do
"I also do (that)." (Chinese: 我也做)

Na mans/nyoengx dheuu zuu hom coem.
he/she only take one CLF fruit
"He only took one fruit." (Chinese: 他只要一个果子)

These adverbs "mans" and "nyoengx" can be linked together to emphasize the voice, e.g.,

Na mans-nyoengx zaux zuu zuen hluuek.
he/she only have one CLF child
"He has only one child." (Chinese: 他只有一个孩子)

=== Timing ===
- 【bhaeis，已经】: already
- 【kuenx，先】: earlier, before, first, in advance
- 【naeus，刚】: just, a moment ago
- 【faets，正在】: in process
- 【dhom，还】: still, yet
- 【fan，就，便】: then (This word is usually used in a narrative when describing something.)
- 【goms，就】: then (This word is usually used in a quote.)
- others

These adverbs cannot be doubled for intensity, except for the adverb "naeus", e.g.,

Na {naeus naeus} buuen.
he/she just come
"He has just come." (Chinese: 他刚刚来)

Adverbs for indicating timing usually modify verbs, and are placed before the verbal phrase, e.g.,

Na dhom da hei zo.
he/she still not go ACCENT
"He hasn't gone yet." (Chinese: 他还没去呢)

Zuughanx hluet blongs hou fan laeis na.
{right after} enter house I then see he/she
"As soon as I entered the house, I saw him." (Chinese: 一进门我就看见他)

meuu buuen dhaens neix goms bhaeisyous hei beuu.
you come to here then never/not go back
"(Since) You came here, don't go back." (Chinese: 你来到这里了，就别再回去了)

Meuu kuenx rien.
you first say
"You speak first." (Chinese: 你先说)

However, the adverb "kuenx" can also be placed after the verbal phrase, e.g.,

Meuu rien kuenx.
you say first
"You speak first." (Chinese: 你先说)

=== Duplication or continuation ===
- 【loms，又，再，还】: also, again,
- 【uuloms，又，再，还】: also, again,
- 【toengs，互相】: each other
- others

These adverbs modify verbs; the word "loms" or "uuloms" is placed before a verb, and the word "toengs" is placed after a verb, e.g.,

Meuu loms rien zuu gaeis.
you again say one CLF
"Repeat that once more." (Chinese: 你再说一遍)

Kun taeix toengs he.
they fight {each other} ACCENT
"They fought each other." (Chinese: 他们互相打架了)

The verb being modified by the adverb "toengs" can be modified by other adverbs, which are placed before the verb, e.g.,

Meuuda yous taeix toengs as!
{you.PL} don't fight {each other} ACCENT
"Don't fight each other!" (Chinese: 你们别互相打架了！)

=== Emphasis or transition ===
- 【oms，又，却】: but, a signal word for a transition
- 【naus，到底】: a signal word for emphasis
- 【cuuslax，原来】: so, a signal word for a transition
- others

These adverbs modify verbs or adjectives, and usually are placed before the verb or adjective, e.g.,

Baiscai long neix oms caeu.
big-tree big such but break
"Such a big tree, but (it) was broken!" (Chinese: 这样大的树却断了)

Aeu naus cas meuu vuek meshes
others EMPH scold you do {what (= why)}
"Why do people scold you?" (Chinese: 人家到底为什么骂你？)

A more unusual placement of these adverbs is at the beginning of a sentence, e.g.,

Cuuslax na dhuus max.
so he/she exist/in there
"So, there he is!" (Chinese: 原来他在那里！)

== Conjunctions ==
=== Link nouns, pronouns, noun phrases, or verb-object phrases ===
- 【uengx，和，与】: and
- 【ku，跟，同，和】: and, to, with
- 【nyuek，同，和】: and, with
- others

That link nouns:

Ba ku bou zestoengs kweis lax tax.
dog and pig {fight each other} want eat rice
"A dog and a pig fight each other for food to eat." (Chinese: 狗和猪争吃)

Toengsdhun nyuek toengsblongs uengxtoengs ojiep.
wife and husband together learn
"A husband and (his) wife study together." (Chinese: 妻子和丈夫共同学习)

That link pronouns:

Hou uengx meuu uengxtoengs vuek gong.
I and you together do work
"I and you will work together." (Chinese: 我和你共同干活)

That link noun phrases:

Hou duuengx meuu dheuu zuu hom coem long ku hlaus hom guengs.
I give you AUX one CLF fruit big and two CLF basket
"I'll give you the big fruit and two large baskets." (Chinese: 我给你一个大果子和两个大箩筐)

That link verb-object phrases:

Dhes hei qix lax tax ku lax bhiengx.
I go street eat rice and eat {sticky rice wine}
"I hit the streets to eat rice and drink wine." (Chinese: 我上街吃饭和喝酒)

These conjunctions can be added to more than two nouns, pronouns, or phrases; These conjunctions can even be placed before the first noun, pronoun, or phrase, e.g.,

Uengx hou uengx meuu uengx na hei caty gong.
and I and you and he go buy stuff
"I and you and he will go shopping." (Chinese: 我和你和他去买东西)

These conjunctions can also function as prepositions, as can be seen in the chart below:

	As a conjunction	As a preposition
Ku	Hou ku na hei. I and he go "I and he go." (Chinese: 我和他去)	Hou rien ku na. I say to him "I said to him."(Chinese: 我跟他说)
Uengx	Meuu zaux bhit uengx qias hyos? You have pen and paper Q "Do you have pen and paper?" (Chinese: 你有纸和笔吗？)	Meuu rien uengx na hyos? You say to him Q "Are you talking to him?" (Chinese: 你跟他说吗？)
Nyuek	Pasdza nyuek hluuek dhuus blongs. Father and child(ren) in house "The father and the child(ren) are at home." (Chinese: 父亲和孩子在家)	Baisdza gaux nyuek hluuek. Mother {lie down} with child(ren) "The mother sleeps with her child(ren)." (Chinese: 母亲和孩子睡)

The word "nyuek" is used in Hlai's folk song, and can be linked with a verb, e.g.,

Baisdza zok nyuek cas, pasdza cas nyuek taeix.
Mother rebuke and scold, father scold and beat
"(The) mother rebuked and scolded, (the) father scolded and beat." (Chinese: 母亲边数落边骂，父亲又骂又打)

Some adverbs, like "loms" (又，却，again) and "hloeis" (顺便，by the way, 而且 and), can also function as conjunctions, e.g.,

Duis hauux long hloeis ghweis.
{water buffalo} that big and fat
"That buffalo is big and fat." (Chinese: 那头水牛大而且肥)

Guen neix bheeng loms muety.
road this wide and straight
"This road is wide and straight." (Chinese: 这条路宽而且直)

=== Link verbs, adjectives, and phrases ===
- 【cuus，或者，还是】: or
- 【cas，或者，还是】: or
- 【cuusnaus，还是】: or
- others

Meuu gaux cuus zongs ngan loepp.
You {lie down} or sit also allow
"You are allowed to either lie down or sit down." (Chinese: 你躺或者坐着都可以)

naeusneix meuu hleny cas da？
Recently you good or not
"How have you been recently?" (Chinese: 近来你好吗？)

Generally, the word "cas" is a synonym of "cuus." Both can be used in indicative and interrogative sentences. But, another synonym "cuusnaus" can only be used in interrogative sentences, e.g.,

Na hei cuusnaus hou hei？
He go or I go
"Is he going or should I go?" (Chinese: 他去还是我去？)

=== Link a single subordinate clause ===
- 【hans，因为】: because
- 【dosdzis，所以】: so
- 【laeis，如果】: if
- 【tom，但是】: but
- 【dagoms，不然】: otherwise
- others

Hans na da buuen, hou da hei bhe.
Because he not come, I not go ACCENT
"Because he didn't come, I didn't go." (Chinese: 因为他不来，所以我不去了)

Na kueng caqias, dosdzis na kuengghweuu li.
He know script so he know principle
"Because he knows the script, he understands the principle." (Chinese: 因为他有知识，所以他懂道理)

Laeis meuu hei, hou goms dzoeng meuu.
If you go I then wait you
"If you go, then I'll wait for you." (Chinese: 如果你去，我就等你)

qimax gha vaet baisias, tom hansneix da dhong qihauux bhe.
Before we poor {very much} but now not like before ACCENT
"Before we were very poor, but now we are not like we were before." (Chinese: 以前我们很穷，但是现在和那个时候不同了)

Meuu hei, dagoms na hei.
You go otherwise he go
"You go, otherwise he'll go." (Chinese: 你去，不然他去)

The word "dagoms" also means "not only" or "or", e.g.,

Na dagoms gieu laix dax, uuloms gieu kieux muens.
He {not only} {know how} plow field {but also} {know how} reap rice
"Not only does he know how to plow, but he also knows how to harvest." (Chinese: 他不但会犁田，而且会割稻)

Meuu fei guen hei, dagoms zongs qia hei.
You walk road go otherwise sit car go
"You (can) walk (there), or take a bus (there)." (Chinese: 你走路去，或者坐车去)

=== Link two or more clauses ===
The first clause	The latter clause
Not only... 不但...	but also/even... 而且...
dacaux... danyoengx... dagoms...	uengx... koms... toep...

Gas dacaux lax gans, lax uengx noms.
Horse {not only} eat grass eat also water
"A horse not only eats grass, but also drinks water." (Chinese: 马不但吃草，而且喝水)

Na dacaux taeix meuu, taeix koms hou.
He {not only} beat you beat even me
"Not only did he beat you, he even beat me." (Chinese: 他不但打你，而且打我)

Dhes dacaux zaux pasghueng, zaux toep baisghueng.
I {not only} have {younger brother}, have even {younger sister}
"I not only have (a) younger brother(s), (but) I even have (a) younger sister(s)." (Chinese: 我不但有弟弟，而且有妹妹)

Generally, the word "danyoengx" or "dagoms" is the synonym of the word "dacaux", e.g.,

Duis neix danyoengx long kaux, uuloms doengs gans.
buffalo this {not only} big strength {but also} live grass
"The cow is not only strong, but it also eats grass quietly." (Chinese: 这头牛不但力气大，而且安静吃草)

Na dagoms gieu laix dax, uuloms gieu kieux muens.
He {not only} {know how} plow field {but also} {know how} reap rice
"He not only knows how to plow the field, but he also knows how to harvest the rice." (Chinese: 他不但会犁田，而且会割稻)

The first clause	The latter clause
Because... 因为...	so/therefore... 所以...
hans... ienxuis... (this is a loan word)	dosdzis... (this is a loan word)

Hans uupans fas fun, dosdzis hou gax buuen.
Because yesterday sky rain so I cannot come
"(Because) It was raining yesterday, so I couldn't come." (Chinese: 因为昨天下雨，所以我不能来)

=== Relationships between linked elements ===
==== Parallel relationship ====
The conjunction words that express a parallel relationship are "uengx" (和, and), "ku" (和, and), and "nyuek" (和, and), e.g.,

Hou uengx meuu hei.
I and you go
"I'll go with you." (Chinese: 我和你去)

Toengsdhun nyuek toengsblongs uengxtoengs ojiep.
Wife and husband together study/learn
"The husband and wife study together." (Chinese: 妻子和丈夫共同学习)

Hou hei qix caty veengs ku caty kous.
I go street buy shirt/top and buy pants
"I went shopping to buy a coat and to buy pants. (Chinese: 我上街买上衣和买裤子)

==== Progressive relationship ====
The conjunctions that express a progressive relationship are "loms" (又, again), "hloeis"(并且, 而且, and), and similar phrases like "dacaux…koms…" (不但...而且...，not only... but also...), e.g.,

Na lax zuu feek loms zuu feek.
He eat one bite and one bite
"He eats (one) bite by (one) bite." (Chinese: 他吃一口又一口)

Gong neix fas hloeis ghety.
stuff this sour and hot
"This is sour and hot." (Chinese: 这东西又酸又辣)

Na dacaux cas hou, cas koms/uengx meuu.
He {not only} scold me scold even/and you
"Not only did he scold me, but he even/also scolded you." (Chinese: 他不但骂我，而且骂你)

In the construction of phrases like "dacaux…koms…" ("not only…but also…"), the conjunctions "but also" ("koms", "uengx", or "toep") must be placed in the second clause, between the verb and the object.

==== Optional relationship ====
The conjunctions that express an optional relationship are "cuus" (或, or), "cas" (或, or), "cuusnaus" (或, or), "casnus" (或, or), and "dagoms" (或, or), e.g.,

Meuuda kweis hei geek hla cuus da?
You want go {look for} fish or not
"Are you going to go fishing or not?" (Chinese: 你要去捕鱼还是不去？)

Meuu kweis dheuu zuucoeis cuusnaus dheuu zuuyunx？
You want take litchi or take coconut
"Do you want to choose litchi or coconut?" (Chinese: 你要拿荔枝还是椰子？)

==== Transitional relationship ====
The conjunctions that express a transitional relationship are "tom" (但是, but), "oms" (却, but), and "tus" (但是, but), e.g.,

Na ghwaix Hlai, tom kueng rien tun Hlai
He {is not} Li but know say language Li
"He is not a Li, but he speaks the Li dialect." (Chinese: 他不是黎族，但会讲黎话)

Na kweis hei, oms wenysnaeis hwan
He want go but no day
"He's willing to go, but there's no time." (Chinese: 他愿意去，但没有时间)

==== Conditional relationship ====
The conjunctions that express a conditional relationship are "laeis", "dalunx", e.g.,

Dalunx na rien dhongras, hou ngan hei
{no matter what} he say how I also go
"No matter what he says, I'll go." (Chinese: 不管他怎样说，我都去)

Laeis na da buuen, hou goms hei lo
If he not come I then go ACCENT
"If he doesn't come, then I'll go." (Chinese: 如果他不来，我就去了)

==== Causal relationship ====
The conjunctions that express a causal relationship are "hans" (因为, because), "dagoms" (不然, otherwise), e.g.,

Dhes da hei, hans zaux cok
I not go because have sickness
"I'm not going because I'm sick." (Chinese: 我不去，因为有病)

Fas fun, yous hei, dagoms ia cok
Sky rain don't go otherwise gain sickness
"It's raining. Don't go! Otherwise, you'll get sick." (Chinese: 天下雨了，别去，不然要得病)

== Prepositions ==
=== Place, direction, or time ===
The prepositional phrase, which is constructed by the prepositions below, usually is placed after a verb, and acts as an adverbial to modify the verb.

- 【dhuus，在】: in, at, on
- 【tuuen，从】: from
- 【ueks，里】: inside

Meuu doengs dhuus max hyo!
You live in there ACCENT
"You live there!" (Chinese: 你住在那里哟！)

Meuu buuen tuuen ras?
You come from where?
"Where do you come from?" (Chinese: 你从哪里来？)

However, as more and more young generation Li have mingled with Han culture, they have gradually adopted Chinese grammar, and have placed the prepositional phrase before the verb, e.g.,

Meuu dhuus max doengs hyo!
You in there live ACCENT
"You live there!" (Chinese: 你住在那里哟！)

The word "ueks" can be placed after the preposition "dhuus", e.g.,

zongs dhuus ueks hauux
Sit in inside there
"Sit in (inside) there" (Chinese: 坐在那里面)

The prepositional phrase being constructed by the word "ueks" can also act as a subject, e.g.,

Ueks blongs neix mangshais baisias.
Inside house this dark very
"Inside of the house is very dark." (Chinese: 这屋子里面暗得很)

The prepositional phrase, which is constructed by the prepositions below, usually is placed after the verb, and acts as a complement.

- 【dhaens，到】: until
- 【zok，往，向】: toward, to
- 【dhuas，过】: through
- 【buu，在】: on, in
- 【beeng，沿】: along

Bhousaeu dzoeng meuu dhaens cop.
Guest wait you until night
"The guest(s) waited for you until night." (Chinese: 客人等你到晚上)

Fa hei zok ohyaeu.
We go to/toward school
"We are going to the school." (Chinese: 我们到学校去)

Aeu fei reuureuu dhuas ngaeix bhous.
People walk {back and forth} along edge village
"People walk back and forth along the outskirts of the village." (Chinese: 人们络绎不绝走过村边)

Ghais na pien buu huen.
Tell him wear on body
"Tell him to wear it." (Chinese: 叫他穿在身上)

fei beeng ngaeix noms
walk along edge/bank river
"walk along the river bank" (Chinese: 沿着河边走)

The prepositional phrase, which is constructed by the prepositions below, usually is placed before a verb, and acts as an adverbial to modify the verb.

- 【niens，沿】: along

Na niens guen hauux hei ohyaeu.
He along road that go school
"He traveled along that road to school." (Chinese: 他沿着那条路去学校)

However, the prepositional phrase of "niens" can also be placed after a verb, e.g.,

fei niens hyoen dax
walk along ridge field
"walk along the ridge of the field" (Chinese: 沿着田埂走)

=== Prepositions related to method ===
- 【aens，按】: by, according to (this is a loan word)

Kunaeu aens laeustaeng gieu ku gax buuen gauxtoengs.
They {according to} work strong and weak come distribute
"They distributed the work according to the capability of the laborers." (Chinese: 他们按劳动的强弱来分配)

=== Prepositions related to reason, or purpose ===
- 【guu ghais，为了】: for the purpose
- 【uis，为了】: for (this is a loan word)
- 【uislaeus，为了】: for (this is a loan word)
- 【cuuslax，由于】: because of

vuuengx hwoek cuuslax meuu
disturb heart {because of} you
"upset because of you" (Chinese: 心烦由于你)

The word "cuuslax" is only used in poetry as above.

Veeng duis kweis beuu fan taeix duis, {guu ghais} duis dzuuns fei.
Master {water buffalo} want {go back} then hit {water buffalo} {in order that} {water buffalo} fast/quick walk
"The buffalo's owner wanted to go home and so hit the buffalo, in order to get the buffalo to walk fast." (Chinese: 牛主人要回家就打牛，为了叫牛快走)

Since more and more young generation Li have mingled with Han culture, sometimes they express the purpose by using the loan word "uis" or "uisliaeus".

=== Prepositions related to object ===
The prepositional phrase, which is constructed by the prepositions below, usually is placed after verbs, and acts as an adverbial to modify the verb.

- 【toep，连】: even
- 【koms，连】: even
- 【goem，对，和，与】: to, with
- 【ku，对，和】: to

Na vaet toep/koms fok gaux ngan wenysnaeis.
He poor even place {to sleep} also no
"He is so poor that he even has no place to sleep." (Chinese: 他穷得连睡的地方也没有)

vuektun goem na.
sing with him
"Sing a song with him." (Chinese: 和他对唱山歌)

Baisdza rien ku na.
Mother say to him
"(His) mother told him." (Chinese: 母亲对他说)

However, because of the influence of Chinese grammar, the "ku" prepositional phrase can also be placed before the verb, e.g.,

Baisdza ku na rien.
Mother to him say
"(His) mother told him." (Chinese: 母亲对他说)

When a prepositional phrase, constructed by the preposition "dhuas," modifies an adjective as a complement, it indicates a comparison.

- 【dhuas，过】: than

Ghueng baiscuty hlenymuuen dhuas kun hluuekkauus.
{Younger sister} youngest beautiful than plural {older sister}
"The youngest sister is more beautiful than her older sisters." (Chinese: 幺妹子比姐姐们漂亮)

The prepositional phrase, which is constructed by the prepositions below, usually is placed before the verb, and acts as an adverbial to modify the verb.

- 【uengx，和，跟】: with

Na uengx enyxlauux taeixtoengs.
He with kids fight
"He fought with the child(ren)." (Chinese: 他跟小孩打架)

However, the prepositional phrase using "uengx" can also be placed after the verb, e.g.,

Na buuen doengs uengx hluuekpasghueng.
He come play with {young brother}
"He came to play with (his) little brother." (Chinese: 他来跟小弟玩)

=== Prepositions related to agent ===
The prepositional phrase, which is constructed by the prepositions below, usually is placed before the verb, and acts as an adverbial to modify the verb.

- 【ia，被】: by
- 【ghoems，被】: by
- 【dheuu，把】: by using

Na ia ba gaenys he!
He by dog bite ACCENT
"He was bitten by a dog!" (Chinese: 他被狗咬了)

Hou ghoems na taeix bhe.
I by him hit ACCENT
"I was hit by him." (Chinese: 我被他打了)

Baisdza dheuu ghei roengx tax.
Mother use rice cook rice
"Mother cooked rice from grains of rice." (Chinese: 母亲把米煮成饭)

== Auxiliary words ==
=== Structural auxiliary words ===
There are three words in the category of structural auxiliary words: "guu", "uu-", and "dhaens"

When the word "guu" is placed before a noun or a pronoun to indicate subordination, this combination functions as a possessive phrase, and can only be in the predicate of the sentence, e.g.,

Gong neix guu meuu.
Stuff this {belong to} you
"This is yours." (Chinese: 这东西是你的)

Blongs hauux man guu dhes.
House that is {belong to} me
"That house is mine." (Chinese: 那房子是我的)

However, the word "guu" can be omitted, e.g.,

Veengs neix veengs na.
shirt/top this shirt/top he/she
"This dress is hers." (Chinese: 这件衣服是她的)

The auxiliary prefix "uu-" can be added to some verbs or adjectives. After adding this prefix, the nominalized verb or adjective can be a subject, object, or an attribute, but cannot be a predicate, e.g.,

Uu-ghaens hleny.
NMLZ-red good
"The red one is good." (Chinese: 红的好)

Neix man gong uu-lax.
This is stuff NMLZ-eat
"This is something that can be eaten." (Chinese: 这是吃的东西)

Another structural auxiliary word is "dhaens". It is usually placed after a verb or an adjective, and is followed by a complement that indicates the result or degree of the action/situation, e.g.,

Kaeix dhaens nyan.
Cold {so as to} shiver
"It is so cold as to (make one) shiver." (Chinese: 冷得发抖)

Na hei dhaens ngaeix noms fan beuuluung.
He go arrive edge/bank river then {come back}
"He went to the riverside and later he will come back." (Chinese: 他去到河边就回来)

=== Past tense auxiliary word ===
The word "dhuas" is placed after a verb to indicate an action has already happened, e.g.,

Hou hei dhuas Bhakgengs.
I go PERF Beijing
"I have been to Beijing." (Chinese: 我去过北京)

=== Acting-receiving auxiliary words ===
Both the auxiliary words "lax" and "dheuu" are often used to indicate the relationship of acting and receiving between an agent and a patient.

The original meaning of the word "lax" is "to eat", however, the meaning changes when it acts as an auxiliary word; the word "lax" is usually placed after the person-object in double-object sentences, even when the thing-object is absent.

Pashlaus hou duuengx na lax zuu lang ba.
{Older brother} my give him AUX one CLF dog
"My brother gave him a dog." (Chinese: 我哥哥给他一只狗)

Hou rien duuengx na lax.
I say to him AUX
"I spoke to him." (Chinese: 我讲给他)

The original meaning of the word "dheuu" is "to take", however, the meaning changes when it acts as an auxiliary word, e.g.,

Na duuengx hou dheuu zuu hom coem.
He give me AUX one CLF fruit
"He gave me one fruit." (Chinese: 他给我一个水果)

Zuu hom zuuyunx neix duuengx meuu dheuu.
One CLF coconut this give you AUX
"This coconut is for you." (Chinese: 这一个椰子给你)

Generally, the word "lax" and "dheuu" are exchangeable.

== Accent markers ==
=== Indicative mood ===
There are several words used in the indicative mood, like "lo", "bhe", "ve/vi", "he", "zu/zo", and "rus"

==== 【lo, 了】 ====
This word indicates that something is in the process, or is forth coming, and it expresses the feeling of hope or surprise, e.g.,

Fas fun lo.
sky rain ACCENT
"It's going to rain." (Chinese: 天要下雨了)

Meuu dhongneix vuek goms da dhiu lo.
you {like this} do then not right ACCENT
"It is not right for you to do this." (Chinese: 你这样做就不对了)

==== 【bhe, 啊】 ====
This word indicates something has already happened, and it usually does not express the subjective feeling, e.g.,

Fas fun bhe.
sky rain ACCENT
"It is raining (it rained)." (Chinese: 天（已经）下雨了)

Aeu reek hauux hlaeux bhe.
person bad that die ACCENT
"That bad man died." (Chinese: 那个坏人死了)

==== 【ve/vi, 的, 了】 ====
This word indicates that the speaker is explaining something, and the speaker's tone is certain, e.g.,

Qias neix ghwaix hou taeis ve.
letter this {is not} I write ACCENT
"This word is not what I wrote." (Chinese: 这字不是我写的)

Meuu duuengx hou goms bhaeis ve.
you give I then finish ACCENT
"Give (it to) me, then it's done." (Chinese: 你给我就行了)

==== 【he，啦】 ====
This word indicates something has already happened, and it does not express the subjective feeling, and the speaker's tone is certain, e.g.,

Dhes vuek gong bhaeis he.
I do work finished ACCENT
"I finished (my) job." (Chinese: 我做完工了)

==== 【zo/zu，还…呢】 ====
This word indicates something is a fact or true, in which the speaker tries to persuade others, and the speaker's tone is certain, e.g.,

Hla dhom hlou zo.
Fish still alive ACCENT
"The fish is still alive." (Chinese: 鱼还活着呢)

Na dhom da vuek zo!
He still not do ACCENT
"He hasn't done it yet." (Chinese: 他还没做呢)

Sometimes the words "zo/zu" can have "ho" or "nex" added to them to put an emphasis on the mood, e.g.,

Aeu reek hauux da hlaeux zuho!
person bad that not die ACCENT
"Why hasn't the bad man died yet?" (Chinese: 那个坏人怎么还没死呢！)

Hou da laeis meshes zunex!
I not see anything ACCENT
"I haven't seen anything!" (Chinese: 我什么都没看见呢)

==== 【rus，呢】 ====
This word indicates that something is not sure, and the speaker's tone is mild and indirect, tactful, e.g.,

Hwanneix na da buuen rus.
today he not come ACCENT
"He won't come today." (Chinese: 今天他不来呢)

Fa neix zuu tienx zans zuu tienx luei, da laeis rus.
we this one {fish's name} up one {fish's name} down not see ACCENT
"(A fish said:) We fish swam back and forth, (you) did not see." (Chinese: 我们这鲩鱼一下游上，一下游下，没看见呢)

=== Interrogative mood ===
There are several words used in the interrogative mood, like "hos", "yos", "os", "hyos", "zuumos", "huux", "hauux", "yax", "nex/nix", "zuurasve", "bas/vixbas", and "zuuras/cuusras".

==== 【hos，yos，os，hyos, zuumos，吗】 ====
These words are used in common interrogative sentences, e.g.,

Meuu da hei vuek gong hos?
you not go do work Q
"Don't you go to work?" (Chinese: 你不去干活吗？)

Neix man {guu meuu} os?
this is yours Q
"Is this yours?" (Chinese: 这是你的吗？)

Meuu beuu ngop dhang hou vi zuumos?
You {come back} think face my ACCENT Q
"You came back (because) you are thinking of me?" (Chinese: 你回来是因为想我吗？)

==== 【huux，hauux，呢，呀】 ====
These words are used in sentences with an interrogative pronoun, e.g.,

Meuu caty gong meshes huux?
you buy stuff what Q
"What do you buy?" (Chinese: 你买什么东西呢？)

Meuu uuras hauux?
you who Q
"Who are you?" (Chinese: 你是谁？)

==== 【nex/nix，yax，呢，呀】 ====
These words are used in common interrogative sentences, e.g.,

Gha uengxtoengs kweis caep cas caem nix?
we everyone AUX {carry by hands} or {carry or shoulders} Q
"Do we carry (it) with our hands or carry (it) on our shoulders?" (Chinese: 咱们大家要挑还是抬呢？)

Neix {guu asras} yax?
this whose Q
"Whose is this?" (Chinese: 这是谁的呀？)

==== 【zuuras/cuusras，吗】 ====
These words are used in interrogative sentences where the speaker inquires by questioning closely, e.g.,

Hwanneix hou uengx na kweis hei Damxax, meuu loms da hei zuuras?
today I and he auxiliary go, Sanya you again not go Q
"Today I'm going to Sanya with him, aren't you going?" (Chinese: 今天我和他要去三亚，难道你又不去吗？)

Kun uengxtoengs vuek gong, meuu oms da vuek cuusras?
they everyone do work you but not do Q
"Everyone is working, but why aren't you?" (Chinese: 他们一起干活，难道你不干吗？)

==== 【zuurasve，bas/vixbas，吧，了吧】 ====
These words express a possibility, e.g.,

Na buuen zuurasve?
he come Q
"Did he come?" (Chinese: 他来了吧？)

meuu bhaeis cuis ang vixbas?
you already burn field Q
"Did you already burn the field?" (Chinese: 你烧山栏地了吗？)

meuu kweis hei bas?
you FUT go Q
"Are you going to go?" (Chinese: 你要去吗？)

=== Imperative mood ===
There are several words used in the imperative mood, like "as", "bas", "res", "bhislo".

==== 【as，吧，啊】 ====
This word is used to enjoin or to exhort someone to join in to do something, and the tone is soft and gentle, e.g.,

Meuuda dzueis gas fa as!
you look horse we IMP
"Look at our horses!" (Chinese: 你们看我们的马吧！)

Goms dhonghauux as！
then {like that} IMP
"That's it!" (Chinese: 就那样吧！)

==== 【bas，啊，吧】 ====
This word is used to command, to request, or to exhort someone to do something, e.g.,

Meuu dheuu bas!
you take IMP
"Take it!" (Chinese: 你拿吧！)

Duuengx hou zuu hom ghaeix bas!
give me one CLF {cucurbita gourd} IMP
"Give me a gourd!" (Chinese: 给我一个葫芦瓜吧！)

==== 【bhislo，咯】 ====
This word is used by one with a discontented mood to command, to request, or to hasten someone to do something, e.g.,

Vuek dzuuns bhislo!
do quickly IMP
"Do it quickly!" (Chinese: 快做咯！)

Hansneix bhaeis zaux caqias gha Hlai, uengxtoengs guulax tuuen kaux o bhislo!
now already have script we Li, everyone should out. strength learn IMP
"Now that we Li already have a script, we should do our best to learn it!" (Chinese: 现在已经有咱们黎族文字，大家应该要努力学习咯！)

Sometimes the word "bhislo" is also used to put an emphasis on the indicative mood, e.g.,

Meuu hluumsghweuu mos？ Neix man caqias Hlai bhislo!
You NEG-know Q This is script Li ACCENT
"Don't you know? This is Li people's script!" (Chinese: 你不知道吗？这就是黎族文字呀！)

==== 【res，吧】 ====
The usage of this word is similar with the word "bas", however, the tone of the word "res" is kind and warm, e.g.,

Meuuda dzuuns lax res!
you quickly eat IMP
"Come on, eat quickly!" (Chinese: 你们快吃吧！)

Hluet buuen res!
enter come IMP
"Come on in!" (Chinese: 进来吧！)

=== Exclamatory mood ===
There are several words used in the exclamatory mood, like "ho", "a", "aei", "aiho", and "o". These words strongly express the speaker's feeling, e.g.,

Meuu rien dhiu dhat ho!
you say right very EXCM
"You're right!" (Chinese: 你说对极了！)

Yous taeixtoengs a!
don't {fight each other} EXCM
"Don't fight!" (Chinese: 别打架了！)

Usually, these words are placed in the end of a sentence; however, sometimes these words act as one word sentences, e.g.,

O! Pasceuus hauux hleny dhat o!
EXCM guy that good very EXCM
"Ah! That young man is great!" (Chinese: 啊！那小伙子好极了！)

Aei! Bhaeis poens he.
EXCM already break ACCENT
"Oh! It's broken." (Chinese: 唉！已经破了。)

Aiho! Cok baisias ho!
EXCM pain {very much} EXCM
"Oh! It's painful!" (Chinese: 哎哟！痛极了！)

== Onomatopoeic words ==
Onomatopoeic words for expressing the feeling of surprise, exclamation, or agreement. Usually, these words are independent/separated from a sentence or clause, e.g.,

Aidza! Cok raeis ha!
Ouch! Pain intestines ACCENT
"Oh dear! What stomach pains!" (Chinese: 哎呀！肚子疼啊！)

Aiho! Cok baisias ho!
Ouch! Pain {very much} ACCENT
"Oh, what great pain!" (Chinese: 哎哟，痛极了！)

Ihyos! Noms bhaeis long bhe!
Ah! River already big ACCENT
"Yo! The water has gone up!" (Chinese: 哟！水涨了！)

Isdzos! Neix man meshes?
Mmm! This is what
"Oh, what is this?" (Chinese: 哟，这是什么？)

However, some onomatopoeic words can go with or within a sentence or clause, e.g.,

Euu, dhonghauux {} bhe!
Yes, that (is) ACCENT
"Yes, just like that!" (Chinese: 唉，是那样！)

Na bhaeis euu cas da?
He already agree or not
"Did he already agree or not?" (Chinese: 他唉（答应）了吗？)

Onomatopoeic words for imitating human, animate, or nature sounds，e.g.,

Hluuek'ueng raeux hihi dhuus hauux.
Girl laugh ONOMATOPOEIA in there
"The girl laughed there." (Chinese: 姑娘在那里嘻嘻地笑)

Fas fun fosfos bhe.
sky rain ONOMATOPOEIA ACCENT
"It is raining." (Chinese: 天哗哗地下雨了)

Gaet fan loms roeng, "Beets! Beets! Beets!"
{Frog (with-long-legs)} then again call ONOMATOPOEIA ONOMATOPOEIA ONOMATOPOEIA
"The frog called again, "Ribbit! Ribbit! Ribbit!" (Chinese: 长腿蛙又叫，"别！别！别")

More onomatopoeic words below:

Birds	catcatscat, "鸟叫声; bird"; hwaxhwax, "鸟叫声"; jitjit, "喳喳（鸟叫声）" aekk/aekaek, "乌鸦的叫声，crow"; guxguguxgus, "布谷鸟的叫声"; gaengxgoeng, "冈工（鸟叫声）"; zatzat, "麻雀叫声"; aepaep, "鸭叫声，duck" weepweep, "母鸡叫声"; gokgok, "母鸡叫小鸡的声音"; goksguudheek, "母鸡下蛋的叫声" jiepp, "小鸡叫声"
Four-legged animal	bhesbhes, "黄牛的叫声，cow"; uungas, "（牛）叫；牛叫声"; hexhex, "羊叫声，goat"; ixhes, "马叫声，horse"; vuns, "狗叫，吠"; kuek, "（麂子）叫"; mieuxmieux, "咪咪（猫叫声）"; nyaeuxnyaeux, "猫叫声"
Insect	nongxniengx, "蝉叫声"; hwexhwex, "蝉叫声" rixrix, "蟋蟀鸣叫声" guuroks, "一种青蛙"（guuroks 像它的叫声）"
Sounds of nature or action	bhoengs, "当当（打锣声）"; bhopp, "东西落地声"; bloks, "小石头或青蛙落水声"; blongx, "扑通（重物落地或落水声）"; ceepp, "脚步声"; blus, "扑通（落水声）"; dongdong, "咚咚（打鼓声）"; fittfitt, "哭泣声"; gakgak, "笑声"

== Phrases ==
=== The construction of phrases and their basic rules ===
There are five kinds of phrases: the coordinative phrases, the attribute phrases, the verb-object phrases, the complement phrases, and the subject-predicate phrases.

==== Coordinative phrases ====
The method used to coordinate equivalent elements in a coordinative phrase is to use conjunctions, but another method is not to use conjunctions. The nouns and pronouns sometimes use the conjunctions, sometimes they do not.

父 母
bais pas
mother father
"parents"

鸡 和 鸭
kai ku/uengx eps
chicken and duck
"chicken and duck"

Usually, the verbs and adjectives need conjunctions.

taeix loms cas
beat and scold
"beat and scold"

fas hloeis ghety
sour and hot
"sour and hot"

However, when the verbs and adjectives are doubled, there is no need for conjunctions.

往 往 返 返
hei hei luueng luueng
go go back back
"go back and forth"

红 红 绿 绿
kiu kiu ghaens ghaens
green green red red
"green and red"

==== Attribute phrases ====
The elements in the attribute phrases are not equivalent; one element is the head word, and the other element is the modifier that modifies the head word. Usually, the head word is a noun, a verb, or an adjective.

===== Noun as the head word =====
Usually, the modifier is placed after the noun head word.

====== Noun (the head word) + noun ======
猪 肉
aek bou
meat pig
"pork"

牛 角
hau duis
horn {water buffalo}
"buffalo's horn"

====== Noun + adjective ======
noms ghan
water cold
"cold water"

veengs baen
shirt/top new
"new shirt/top"

The word "enyx" (小, small) is the exception where the modifier is placed before the head word, e.g.,

enyx veengs
small shirt/top
"kid's shirt (it also means brassiere)"

enyx duis
small {water buffalo}
"calf (young water buffalo)"

enyx dziengx
small finger
"little finger (pinkie)"

====== Noun + verb ======
fok gaux
place sleep
"a place for sleeping"

daty bheny
bird fly
"(a) flying bird(s)"

====== Noun + pronoun ======
pashlaus hou
{older brother} my
"my older brother"

blongs hauux
house that
"that house"

====== Number + classifier + noun (the head word) ======
The modifier, which is constructed with a number and classifier, must be placed before the head word.

fus zuen aeudza
three CL {old man}
"three old men"

hlaus hom dzuuem
two CL egg
"two eggs"

====== Attribute phrases influenced by Chinese ======
Like Chinese, these modifiers are placed after the head word, and most of these words are loan words, e.g.,

Noun + noun (the head word)

Dongxgoknaengsmiens
China people
"Chinese people"

Adjective + noun (the head word)

hiuxdius odex
superior student
"superior student"

Verb + noun (the head word)

goeisgiet muixdhoeis
resolve problem
"resolving (the) problem"

===== Verb as the head word =====
The modifiers that modify verbs are the adverbs, adjectives, pronouns, nouns, numbers, or verbs. Usually, the monosyllabic modifier is placed before the head word; the disyllabic/doubled adjective, the pronoun, or the number can be either placed before or after the head word, e.g.,

====== Adverb + verb ======
da oep
not love/like
"don't like"

bhaeis lax
already eat
"already ate"

yous rien
Don't say
"don't say"

naeus buuen
just come
"just came"

ais lax
{not willing to} eat
"not willing to eat"

====== Adjective + verb ======
dzuuns rien
quick say
"(be)quick (to) say(it)" (it means out with it)

hleny lax
good eat
good (to) eat" (it means delicious)

gin lax
hurry eat
"busy eating"

====== Noun + verb ======
cai vuek
wood make
"made of wood"

uuhaux hei
tomorrow go
"(will) go tomorrow"

====== Verb + verb (the head word) ======
oep lax
like eat
"like to eat"

hei dzok
go steal
"go (and) steal"

gaux dzueis
{lie down} look
"reading lying down"

====== Disyllabic/doubled adjective + verb (the head word), or verb (the head word) + disyllabic/doubled adjective ======
dais dais fei= fei dais dais

slow slow walk

"慢慢走，walk slowly" (This is also used to say good bye.)

dzuuns dzuuns raux = raux dzuuns dzuuns

quick quick read

"快快读，read quickly"

hleny hleny rien = rien hleny hleny

good good say

"好好说，say (it) nicely"

liloek vuek= vuek liloek

dark do

"漆黑做，do (it in) darkness"

====== Pronoun + verb (the head word), or verb (the head word) + number ======
dhonghauux nyop = nyop dhonghauux

like that sew

"那样缝，sew like that"

dhongras vuek? = vuek dhongras?

how do

"怎么做？How is it to be done?"

qiras hei? = hei qiras?

When go

"何时走？When (is it time to) go?"

====== Number + verb (the head word), or verb (the head word) + number ======
zuu gaeis hei = hei zuu gaeis

one classifier go

"去一趟，(make) a trip" (means to run an errand)

fus faei taeix= taeix fus faei

three classifier beat

"打三下，beat (something) three times"

zuu kuuengx zuu kuuengx ghwa= ghwa zuu kuuengx zuu kuuengx

one classifier one classifier plant

"一棵一棵地种，plant one by one"

zuu boms zuu boms lax= lax zuu bomszuu boms

one classifier one classifier eat

"一口一口地吃，eat one (bite) at a time"

===== Adjective as the head word =====
The modifiers that modify adjectives are adjectives, adverbs, or pronouns. Usually, when the modifier is an adjective or adverb, the modifier is placed before the head word, e.g.,

====== Adjective + adjective (the head word) ======
hleny coem
good sharp
"so sharp"

reek coem
bad sharp
"not sharp"

====== Adverb + adjective (the head word) ======
duix reek
most bad
"worst"

bhaeis reek
already bad
"already (gone) bad"

Only few adverbs, like "dhat" (真, 很, really, very) or "baisias" (非常, 极, very much, most), are placed after the head word, e.g.,

====== Adjective (the head word) + adverb ======
dzuuns dhat
quick very
"very quick"

hleny baisias
good {very much}
"very good"

Also, when the modifier is a demonstrative pronoun, interrogative pronoun or noun, the modifier is placed after the head word, e.g.,

====== Adjective (the head word) + demonstrative pronoun ======
vaet neix
poor this
"this poor"

long dhongneix
big {like this}
"this big"

peek dhonghauux
high {like that}
"that high"

====== Adjective (the head word) + interrogative pronoun ======
bheeng ras?
wide How?
"How wide?"

hloei ras?
many/much how?
"How many/much?"

====== Adjective (the head word) + noun ======
long nyiu
big bull
"big as a bull"

bheeng laengs
wide sea
"wide as the sea"

The construction of the phrase above actually is: Adjective (the head word) + dhong/bhaen + noun, the word "dhong" (像, as, like) or "bhaen" (像, as, like) is omitted, e.g.,

long (dhong) nyiu
big as bull
"big as a bull"

==== Verb-object phrases ====
The verb is the head word, and the object can be a noun, a pronoun, a number, or a verb. Usually, the verb is placed before the object, e.g.,

===== Verb (the head word) + noun (object) =====
lax tax
eat rice
"eat rice (the meaning is to eat)"

dzueis qias
look book
"read book (the meaning is to read)"

===== Verb (the head word) + pronoun (object) =====
dheuu hauux
take that
"take that one"

ngwaety meuu
call you
"(I'll) call you"

bhiek meshes
{carry (something) on shoulder} what?
"carry what"

===== Verb (the head word) + verb (object) =====
dhas rien
fear say
"怕说，fears to say"

auux vuuek
dare do
"dare to do (something)"

===== Verb (the head word) + number (object) =====
caty zuu hom
buy one CL
"buy one"

lax fus waeu
eat three CL
"eat three bowls (of food)"

===== Verbal adjective (the head word) + noun (object) =====
Some verbal adjectives can act as the head word with the noun as the object, e.g.,

leis aeu
thin people
"(makes) people thin"

ghweis aeu
fat people
"(makes) people fat"

==== Complement phrases ====
The complement phrases include both a verb-complement phrase and an adjective-complement phrase.

===== Verb-complement phrase =====
The verb is the head word, and the complement can be a verb, an adjective, or a number with a classifier. The verb is placed before the complement.

====== Verb (the head word) + verb (complement) ======
fei hluet
walk {go into}
"walk in"

dheuu buuen
take come
"plan to come"

====== Verb (the head word) + adjective (complement) ======
lax kuuem
eat full
"ate (until) full (stuffed)"

riemx hleny
fix good
"fixed well"

roengx fui
cook cooked
"cooked thoroughly"

====== Verb (the head word) + number (complement) ======
fei zuu guen
walk one CL
"(make) a trip" (means to run an errand)

fun ba hwan ba cop
run five day five night
"(it) rained five days and five nights"

====== Verb (the head word) + noun (complement) ======
In this case, the verb must be an intransitive verb, and the phrase can be an independent clause or a predicate.

bhaeis hlaeux duis he.
already die {water buffalo} ACCENT
"The water buffalo already died."

===== Adjective-complement phrase =====
The adjective is the head word, and the complement can be a verb, an adjective, or a number with a classifier. The complement indicates the result of the head word, so usually the auxiliary word "dhaens" is placed between the complement and the head word.

====== Adjective (the head word) + dhaens + verb (complement) ======
kaeix dhaens nyan
cold {as to} shiver
"(so) cold as to shiiver"

reek haeis dhaens asras ruus ais dheuu
bad smell {as to} who all {not willing to} take
"(so) foul smelling as to not one is willing to take (it)"

====== Adjective (the head word) + dhaens + adjective (complement) ======
gheuu dhaens ghau
thin {as to} transparency
"(so) thin as to be transparent"

fui dhaens ghaens
cooked {as to} red
"(so) cooked (hot) as to become red"

====== Adjective(the head word) + number (complement) ======
long fus boux
big three CL/year
"three years older"

hloei zuu hom
many one CL
"one more"

peek zuutom ghwous
high half head
"a half-head taller"

====== Adjective (the head word) + noun (complement) ======
In this case, the adjective acts not as an attribute to the noun, but functions as expository to the noun. The phrase can be an independent clause or a predicate.

Long hwoet bhe！
big wind ACCENT
"The wind (is) strong!"

Cok bok dhat lo！
hurt stomach very ACCENT
"A stomachache! (very painful)"

==== Subject-predicate phrases ====
This kind of phrase is constructed by the subject and the predicate; usually, the subject is a noun or a pronoun, and the predicate is a verb or an adjective.

Wenysnaeis aeu rien na reek.
no people say he bad
"No one said he (is) bad."

Uengxtoengs ruus rien gong neix fas.
everyone all say stuff this sour
"Everyone (all) says this stuff (is) sour."

Daty bheny lo.
bird fly ACCENT
"Birds have flown (away)."

Na buuen lo.
he come ACCENT
"He has come."

The construction of the subject-predicate phrase is the same as the attribute phrase.Usually, if there is an element, like an accent, an adverb, or a noun, that is either placed after or before the phrase, then it is a subject-predicate phrase. See the chart below:

Subject-predicate phrases		Attribute phrases	
Daty bheny bhe. birds fly accent	鸟飞了 The birds have flown away.	daty bheny birds fly	飞的鸟 the flying birds
Aeu buuen he. people come accent	人家来了 People have come.	aeu buuen people come	来的人 the people (who) have come
qi coem duuek time fruit ripe	果子成熟的时候 time to harvest fruit	coem duuek fruit ripens	熟的果子 ripened fruit
cai peek baisias tree tall very much	树高得很 The tree (is) very tall.	cai peek tree tall	高的树 tall tree

== Sentence construction and the basic rules ==
blongs dhuus ngaeix noms hauux
house in/exist edge/bank river that
"the house that (is) on the bank of the river"

pashlaus hou uengx pasghueng meuu
{older brother} my and {younger brother} your
my older brother and your younger brother

The statements above are incomplete sentences. But, when we add some critical words, they become complete sentences to communicate a complete thought that makes sense to the listeners or readers, e.g.,

Blongs hauux dhuus ngaeix noms hauux.
house that in/exist edge/bank river that
"That house (is) on the bank of that river."

Pashlaus hou uengx pasghueng meuu ngan gaengxnaengs.
{older brother} my and {younger brother} your also worker
"My older brother and your younger brother (are) both workers."

The chart below presents the grammatical elements that construct a sentence. These elements are a subject, a predicate, an object, a complement, an attribute and an adverbial phrase.

Subject 主语			Predicate 谓语					
Subject 主语			Verb 述语			Object 宾语		
(Attribute) （定语）	Head word 中心语	Attribute 定语	Adverbial 状语	Head word 中心语	(Adverbial) （状语）	(Attribute) （定语）	Head word 中心语	Attribute 定语
(Attribute) （定语）	Head word 中心语	Attribute 定语	Adverbial 状语	Head word 中心语	Complement 补语	(Attribute) （定语）	Head word 中心语	Attribute 定语

=== Subjects ===
The subject is placed before the predicate; and either the nouns, pronouns, numbers, or phrases can be the subject.

=== Predicates ===
The predicate is placed after the subject to provide information about the subject. Usually, verbs or adjectives are the predicate; however, nouns, pronouns, and phrases can also be the predicate.

==== Passive voice ====
In the examples above, the subjects are the actors who act out the actions; however, the subjects can also receive the actions, which is called passive voice. Auxiliary words like "ia" or "ghoems" can be used to denote passive voice, e.g.,

Kai ghoems dauxmuty gaeny bhe.
Chicken by fox bite ACCENT
"A chicken was bit by a fox."

Bhous hauux ghoems fei cuis lo.
Village that by fire burn ACCENT
"That village was burned by fire."

=== Objects ===
An object follows a verb. However, if the sentence is passive voice, the object can be placed before the verb phrase. Usually, a noun, pronoun or phrase can act as an object; sometimes, a number or verb can also be a subject, e.g.,

==== Double objects (with giving-receiving relation) ====
The construction is Verb + person-object + lax/dheuu + thing-object, e.g.,

Baisdza duuengx na lax zuu ruet riens.
Mother give her {auxiliary word} one CL skirt
"Mother gave her a skirt."

Hou dun meuu lax tun Hlai.
I teach you {auxiliary word} language Li
"I teach you the Li lauguage."

Pashlaus duuengx pasghueng dheuu zuu hom zuucoeis.
{older brother} give {younger brother} auxiliary one CL litchi
"The older brother gave (his) younger brother a litchi (a kind of fruit)."

The auxiliary word "lax" can be replaced by the verb "duuengx" (给, give), then the construction becomes Verb + thing-object + duuengx + person-object, and the objects generally cannot be omitted, e.g.,

Hou caty coembhans duuengx meuu.
I buy {longan (fruit)} give you
"I bought longan (to) give to you."

Baisdza caep noms duuengx pasghueng.
Mother carry water give {younger brother}
"The mother carried water (to) give to the younger brother."

Hluuekkauus roengx tax duuengx baisghueng.
{Older sister} cook rice give {younger sister}
"The older sister cooked rice (to) give to the younger sister."

Sometimes, the verb "duuengx" (给, for) can be placed both before the thing-object and the person-object, then the sentence construction becomes Verb + duuengx + thing-object + duuengx + person-object, e.g.,

Na duuengx veengs duuengx hou.
He give shirt/top give me
"He gave a shirt to me."

Pasdza da duuengx nomstaengs duuengx dhes.
Father not give sugar give me
"(My) Father did not give me sugar."

When both speaker and listener are clear what the thing-object is, or the subject itself is the given thing, the thing-object can be omitted, but the auxiliary needs to be kept, e.g.,

Meuu duuengx na dheuu.
You give him {auxiliary word}
"You give it to him."

Zuu pienx enyx gas neix duuengx meuu lax.
One CL small knife this give you {auxiliary word}
"This small knife (was) given (to) you."

Zuu lang kai neix duuengx meuu lax.
One CL chicken this give you {auxiliary word}
"This chicken (was) given (to) you."

==== Double objects (without giving-receiving relation) ====
Although some verbs in double-object sentences do not imply the giving-receiving relation, the auxiliary word "lax", which indicates that the subject is "helping" the person-object, is still needed. e.g.,

Hou reengs meuu lax.

I move you auxiliary word (help)

"我帮你搬，I will help you (to) move."

Meuu laix na lax.

You plow him auxiliary word (help)

"你帮他犁田，You help him (to) plow."

Baisdza caep hluuekbaiskaux lax.

Mother carry daughter auxiliary word (help)

"母亲帮女儿挑，A mother helps her daughter carry (the stuff)."

The auxiliary word "lax" can be followed by another object, e.g.,

Taeix dhes lax tax.

Put me auxiliary word (help) rice

"帮我打饭，Please help get me (some) rice."

Hou caty meuu lax bheuucai.

I buy you auxiliary word (help) vegetable

"我帮你买菜，I'll help you buy (some) vegetables."

Na rien na kueng poengs meuu lax ceengcai.

He say he would water you auxiliary word (help) flower

"他说他会帮你给花浇水，He said he would help you water the flowers."

==== Complement ====
There are three kinds of complements: sequential, directional, and quantitative complements. A complement goes after the verb or the adjective, in order to explain the sequence, degree, direction, or amount of the action. Usually, the verb, adjective, number, or phrase acts as a complement. Generally, a complement is placed after a verb, but if an object follows that verb, then the sequential complement and quantitative complement have to be placed after that object; the directional complement can either be placed after or before that object, e.g.,

===== Sequential complement =====
Dzax ghoems taeix hlaeux bhe.

Snake by hit die accent

"蛇被打死了，The snake was beaten to death by (someone)."

Hou bhaeis lax kuuem he.

I already eat full accent

"我已经吃饱了，I have already eaten (rice) and am full."

Na lax tax kuuem he.

He eat rice full accent

"他吃饱饭了，He ate and is full."

If the sequential complement is a phrase, the prepositional word "dhaens" is needed to be placed before the phrase, e.g.,

Na gwaeng dhaens tuuen nomswoms.

He pull preposition go out sweat

"他拉到出汗，He pulled until he sweat."

Duis ghoux dhaens ngaeix noms hauux.

Water buffalo run preposition edge/bank river that

"水牛跑到那河边，The water buffalo ran to the bank of that river."

Veengs neix baen dhaens asras ruus qieng cat.

shirt/top this new preposition whoever also want wear

"这衣服新到谁都想穿，This shirt is so new that everyone wants to wear it."

===== Directional complement =====
The directional complement is constructed by a verb + a directional verb, e.g.,

fei buuen walk come 走来, walk and come	fei beuu walk come back 走回去, walk back	fei dhaens walk arrive 走到, walk to	fei kaen walk go up 走上, walk up	fei hluet walk go into 走进, walk into
fei hei walk go 走去, walk and go	fei luueng walk go back 走回来, walk back	fei dhuas walk pass 走过, walk through	fei luei walk go down 走下, walk down	fei tuuen walk go out 走出, walk out

a. Directional complement without an object

Most directional complements can act as a complement after alone verb, e.g.,

Na qieus buuen bhe.

He bring come accent

"他拿来了，He brought something here."

Duis ghoux hei lo!

Water buffalo run go accent

"水牛跑去了，The water buffalo ran (away)."

Aeudza buuen luueng bhe

Old man come go back accent

"老人回来了，The old man came back."

Uengxtoengs caep hei beuu bhe

Everyone carry go come back accent

"大家挑回去了，Everyone carried (something) back (home)."

Na ais caus. luei ba.

He is not willing to come down down accent

"他不愿意走下来吧，He is not willing to come down."

Na ghoux tuuen hos?

He run go out accent of question

"他跑出来了吗？Did he run out (from there)?"

b. Directional complement with an object

These three directional verbs, "dhuas", "kaen", and "hluet", need an object to go after them, e.g.,

Tuas zuens dhuas zuu dhanx dhaeix.

Rabbit jump over one classifier stream

"兔子跳过一条小沟，The rabbit jumped over a stream."

Uengxtoengs caem kaen hwous max.

Everyone carry on shoulders go up mountain that

"大家抬到那山上，Everyone shouldered (something) up that mountain."

Diu bhaeis ghoux hluet cuengs he.

Mouse already run go into hole accent

"老鼠已经跑进洞，The mouse already ran into the hole."

===== Quantitative complement =====
The quantitative complement, which is constructed by either (number + verbal classifier), or (number + time classifier), usually goes after a verb, sometimes goes after an adjective, e.g.,

a. Verb + (number + verbal classifier)

Hou uengx meuu hei zuu gaeis.

I and you go one classifier

"我和你去一趟，I and you (can) go (there)."

Kai bhaeis hyoen fus dzax bhe.

Chicken already crow three classifier accent

"鸡已经啼三遍了，The rooster has already crowed three times."

b. Verb + (number + time classifier)

Fa bhaeis o zuu bhoux he.

We already learn one year/classifier accent

"我们已经学一年了，We (have) already studied for one year."

Na bhaeis doengs fus hwan he.

He already stay three day accent

"他已经住三天了，He (has) already stayed (for) three days."

Na beuu blongs zaux hlaus nyaen bhe.

He go back home have two month accent

"他回家有两个月了，He has been home for two months now."

c. Adjective + (number + classifier)

Blongs neix peek dhuas blongs hauux zuugit.

House this high/tall than house that a little bit

"这房子比那房子高一点，This house (is just) a little bit taller than that house."

Waeu neix hloei fus hom.

Bowl this more three classifier

"这碗多三个，This bowl (has) three extra (ones)."

==== Attribute ====
The attribute is to modify or to define the subject or object, in order to indicate the characteristics, amount, or possession. Usually, the attribute, which can be an adjective, a noun, a pronoun, a number, a verb, or different kinds of phrases, is placed after the head word, except when a number acts as an attribute, the number must be placed before the head word, e.g.,

===== Noun (head word) + noun (attribute) =====
aek duis

meat water buffalo

"牛肉，beef"

feekx hweek

skin banana

"香蕉皮，banana peel"

coem coeis

fruit litchi

"荔枝果，litchi (fruit)"

dzuuem kai

egg chicken

"鸡蛋，chicken egg"

Na kueng rien tun Hlai.

He know say/speak language/word Li

"他会说黎话，He knows(how to) speak the Li's language."

Neix man bheuu cai.

This is leaf tree

"这是树叶，This is a tree's leaf."

===== Noun (head word) + adjective (attribute) =====
tau loek

pot black

"黑锅，black pot"

zuu fans veengs kaeu

one classifier shirt/top white

"一件白上衣，one white shirt"

noms neix noms ghan.

water this water cold

"这水是冷水，This water (is) cold water."

===== Noun (head word) + pronoun (attribute) =====
Gha Hlai zaux caqias veengzauus bhe.

We Li people have script self accent

"咱们黎族有自己的文字了，We, Li people, have our own script."

Hluuek na kweis hei zok Damxax.

Older sister his/her is going to go to/toward Sanya

"他姐姐要去三亚，His older sister is going to go to Sanya."

===== Number (attribute) + noun (head word) =====
Zuu zuen aeu dhuus blongs max.

One classifier man in house that

"一个人在那边房子，A man (is) in that house."

Hlaus lang duis neix ghweis dhat dhat.

Two classifier water buffalo this fat very very

"这两头牛肥极了，These two water buffalos (are) very, very fat."

===== Noun (head word) + verb (attribute) =====
Dhuus max wenysnaeis fok gaux.

In/at there no place lie down

"在那里没有地方睡，At that place, (there is) no place to sleep."

Toep laty ghoux ruus zeuu loem.

Even wild boar run also shoot right

"连跑的野猪也射中，He shot even a running wild boar right on."

Neix gong lax fa.

This stuff eat our

"这是我们吃的东西，This (is) our food ."

===== Noun (head word) + phrase (attribute) =====
veengs dhuus blongs hauux

shirt/top in house that

"在那房子的衣服，the shirt (that is) in that house"

hluuekueng naeus buuen hauux

girl just come that

"那位刚来的姑娘，that girl (who) just came"

zuu lang duis lax gans kuuem

one classifier water buffalo eat grass full

"一只吃饱草的水牛，a water buffalo (that) eats grass (until it's) full"

qi meuu buuen hauux

time you come that

"你来的那个时候，that time (when) you came"

==== Adverbial ====
The adverbial modifies or defines verbs or adjectives, in order to indicate the why, how, when, and where of the verb, or the degree of the adjective. Most often it is an adverb, an adjective, or a verb that acts as an adverbial; sometimes, a noun, a demonstrative pronoun, interrogative pronoun, a number, and various phrases can also be adverbials. Adverbials can either be placed before or after the verb or adjective. e.g.,

===== Adverbs as adverbials =====
Most adverbs are placed before the verb or adjective, e.g.,

Na oms da buuen zo.

He still not come accent

"他还没来呢，He has not come (yet)."

Hwanneix fas vaeu fous hos.

Today sky mosthot accent

"今天天气很热啊，Today the weather (is) very hot."

Qi lax tax yous rien tun!

Time eat rice don't say/speak word

"吃饭时别说话！It is eating time, don't talk!"

Zuu lang aeu neix da hlenymuuen.

One classifier man this not beautiful

"这个人不漂亮！This person (is) not beautiful."

Only fewadverbs, like "dhat", "luueng", "baisias" and "dhatdhat", are placed after the verb or adjective, e.g.,

Na buuen dhat.

He come really

"他真的来了，He really came."

Na vuek luueng.

He do back

"他重新做，He (is) re-doing (it)."

Gong neix hleny dhatdhat.

Stuff this good really

"这东西真好，This is really good stuff."

Maeis neix dheeng baisias.

Sugarcane this sweet very

"这甘蔗非常甜，This sugarcane (is) very sweet."

===== Adjectives as adverbials =====
Most adjectives are placed before verb or adjective head words. Only a few adjectives, like "hleny" (好, good/so), and "reek" (坏, bad/not so), can be adverbials to modify adjective head words, e.g.,

reek coem

bad/not so sharp

"不锋利，not so sharp"

Gas neix hleny coem hos！

Long knife this good/so sharp accent!

"这把刀好快啊！This knife is (so) sharp!"

Dais fei as, baisdza！

Slow walk accent, old lady!

"慢走啊，老大娘，Slow(ly) walk, (lady/old woman)."

Meuu dzuuns buuen bhe！

You quick come accent

"你快来吧，(You) quick(ly) come."

If an adjective is doubled, it can be placed after the verb, e.g.,

Meuu buuen dzuunsdzuuns bhe！

You come quick quick accent

"你快快来吧，(You) come double quick."

===== Verbs as adverbials =====
When verbs act as adverbials to modify the head word, the head word must be a verb, and the adverbial verbs are placed before that head word, e.g.,

Na ngais rien.

He/she cry say

"她哭着说，She said (it while) crying."

Meuu dzok dzueis meshes?

You steal/secretly look what

"你偷看什么？What are you secretly looking at?"

Na oep lax zuuyunx.

He like eat coconut

"他爱吃椰子，He likes to eat coconuts."

===== Nouns as adverbials =====
When nouns act as adverbials to modify the head word, the head word must be a verb, and the adverbial nouns are placed before that head word, e.g.,

Neix man cai vuek

This is tree make

"这是木制的，This is made of wood."

Meuu ashaux hei hyos?

You tomorrow go question accent

"你明天去吗？Are you going tomorrow?"

===== Pronouns as adverbials =====
When pronouns act as adverbials to modify the head word, the head word must be a verb, and the adverbial pronouns can either be placed before or after that head word, e.g.,

Na dhongneix rien. = Na rien dhongneix.

He like this say = He say like this

"他这样说，He said (it) like this."

Gong neix dhongras vuek = Gong neix vuek dhongras

work this how do = work this do how

"这活儿怎样做？How (is) this work done?"

Qiras dhaens = dhaens qiras

When arrive = arrive when

"何时到？When (will he) arrive?"

However, when pronouns act as adverbials to modify a head word that is an adjective, the adverbial pronouns are only placed after that head word, e.g.,

Gom neix bheeng dhonghauux.

Region this wide/vast like that/so

"这地方那么宽，This region (is) so vast."

Zuu zuen aeu neix hleny dhonghauux.

One classififer man this good/kind like that/so

"这个人那么好，This man (is) so good."

Zuu dhanx dhoei neix daeus ras?

One classififer rope this long how?

"这一条绳子有多长？How long (is) this rope?"

===== Prepositional phrases as adverbials =====
When a prepositional phrase, using the prepositions "ia" (被, by) or "dheuu" (被, by), act as adverbials, the prepositional phrase only modifies a head word that is a verb, and must be placed before that head word, e.g.,

Ia ba gaenys

by dog bite

"被狗咬，bit by a dog"

dheuu na taeix

by him hit

"被他打，hit by him"

When a prepositional phrase, using the prepositions "tuuen" (从, by), "dhuus" (在, in/at), "ku" (对, to), "uengx" (和, and), or "nyuek" (和, and) act as adverbials, the prepositional phrase only modifies the head word that is a verb, and must be placed either before or after that head word, e.g.,

tuuen max zuu dhanx guen kaen hwous

From that one classifier road go up mountain

"从这一条路上山，by that road (one can) go up the mountain"

toek tuuen deuu cai

drop from on tree

"从树上掉下来，drop from the tree"

dhuus blongs dzoeng meuu = dzoeng meuu dhuus blongs

at house/home wait you = wait you at house/home

"在家等你，(I'll) wait for you at home."

ku na rien = rien ku na

to him say = say to him

"对他说，say to him"

uengx meuu hei= hei uengx meuu

With you go = go with you

"同你去，(I'll) go with you."

meuu doengs nyuek na. = meuu nyuek na doengs.

You play with/and him = You with/and him play

"你和他玩，You play with him."

Some prepositions, like "bhi" (比, than/compare), "dhuas" (过, than), "dhong" (同/像/如, same/be like), or "bhaen" (像, be like), have nouns as adverbials to modify the adjective head word, of which some are placed before that head word, others after, and still others either before or after, e.g.,

Before the adjective head word:

Meuu bhi dhes peek.

You than/compare me tall

"你比我高，You (are) taller than me."

After the adjective head word:

Meuu peek dhuas na.

You tall than him

"你高过他，You (are) taller than him."

Ba long dhuas mieux.

Dog big than cat

"狗大过猫，A dog (is) bigger than a cat."

Before or after the adjective head word:

hloek bhaen laengs

deep like/as sea

"像海一样深，as deep as the sea."

enyx dhong guty

small like/as needle

"像针一样小，as small as a needle."

Kai neix bhaen eps ghweis. = Kai neix ghweis bhaen eps.

Chicken this like/as duck fat = Chicken this fat as duck

"这只鸡像鸭一样肥，This chicken (is) as fat as (a) duck."

== Sentence patterns and types ==
=== Sentence patterns and their basic rules ===
==== Simple sentence ====
The simple sentence includes subject-predicate sentence, no subject sentence, one word sentence, e.g.,

===== Subject-predicate sentences =====
Fas fun lo.

sky rain accent

"天要下雨了，It's going to rain."

Na hei bhe.

He go accent

"他去了，He went."

Enyxlauux raeu he.

Child laugh accent

"小孩笑了，(The) child(ren) laughed."

The simple sentences above include two elements: subjects and predicates, however, other elements like objects, complements, or adverbials can be included, e.g.,

(subject + predicate + object)

Hou lax tax.

I eat rice

"我吃饭，I eat rice."

(subject + predicate + complement)

Na qieus buuen bhe.

He bring come accent

"他拿来了，He brought (it with him)."

(subject + adverbial + predicate + complement)

Enyxlauux bhaeis fei hluet blongs.

Child already walk into house

"小孩走进屋子，(The) child(ren) walked into the house."

===== No subject sentences =====
This simple sentences look like inverted sentences, e.g.,

Tuut dhoei bhe.

Break rope accent

"断绳了，The rope (is) broken."

Hloei aeu dhat.

Many people really/very

"人真多，(There are) so many people."

Hlaeux hlai bhe.

Die fish accent

"鱼死了，The fish died."

===== One word sentence =====
Asras？

Who？

"谁？Who?"

Ahyo!

Oh my!

"哎哟！Oh my!"

A: "Meuu kweis da kweis？" B: "Kweis."

    You     be willing to  NEG be willing to        be willing to

A: 'Are you willing (or) not willing?' B: '(Yes, I am) willing.'

A: 你愿意不愿意？B:愿意

==== Compound sentences ====
There are two kinds of compound sentences; one is a coordinate compound sentence, the other is a subordinate compound sentence, e.g.,

===== Coordinate compound sentences =====
The linked clauses in a coordinate compound sentence are equivalent. There are three kinds of relationships between linked clauses: parallel, progressive, and optional.

====== The parallel relationship ======
Usually, there is no need of conjunctions between clauses.

Hou kweis hei kuishuix, na kweis hei ang.

I will go have a meeting he will go field

"我要去开会，他要去山栏地，I'm going to a meeting, he's going to the field."

Coem hweek hou ngan lax dhuas,

Fruit banana I also eat auxiliary past tense

zuuyunx hou ngan lax dhuas.

coconut I also eat auxiliary past tense

"香蕉我吃过，椰子我也吃过，I've eaten bananas, and I have also eaten coconuts."

Na hoen vuek veengs vuek riens,

He/she know how to do shirt do skirt

hoen vuek ang vuek dax.

know how to do hilly field do plain field

"她能做衣服做裙子，能耕田种地，She can make shirts and skirts, (she also) can work (in) hilly (and) plain fields."

====== The progressive relationship ======
The conjunction words that express a progressive relationship between clauses are "loms" (又, still),"oms" (还, 却, yet),"ruus" (都, all), "koms" (连, even/also), and their similar phrases such as "dacaux…koms/uuloms…"(不但...而且...，not only... but also...), e.g.,

Fas bhaeis cop, na loms da beuu.

Sky already late he still not come back

"天已经晚了，他还不回来，It was late, and he still (had) not come back."

Fas oms da dhenys, na bhaeis hei ang he.

Sky yet not bright, he already go field accent

"天尚未亮，他已经去田里了，It was not yet the break of dawn, and he had already gone to the field."

Meuuda man Moei, fa man Hlai, gha ruus man uxaeu Dongxgok.

You are Han, we are Li, we all are people China

"你们是汉族，我们是黎族，咱们都是中国人，You are Han, we are Li, we are all Chinese."

Na kueng rien tun Hlai,

He know how to speak language/word Li

kueng rien koms tun Moei.

know how to speak also/even language/word Han

"他会说黎话，也会说汉话，He knows how to speak the Li language, also knows how to speak the Han language."

hou dacaux dzueis bhaeis, uuloms taeis bhaeis.

I not only read finished, but also write finished

"我不仅看完了，而且写完了，Not only did I finish reading, but I also finished writing."

c. The optional relationship

The conjunction words that express an optional relationship between clauses are "cuus" (或, or), "cas" (或, or), "casnus" (或, or), "cuusnaus" (或, or), and "dagoms" (或, or), e.g.,

Pashlaus meuu buuen, cas pasghueng meuu buuen.

Old brother your come, or younger brother your come

"你哥哥来，还是你弟弟来，(Either) your older brother (will) come, or your younger brother (will) come."

Lax man cuusnaus lax tax？

Eat potato or eat rice

"吃白薯还是米饭？Do you eat potatoes or rice?"

Meuu rien ku na, dagoms rien ku hou.

You say/tell to him, or say/tell to me

"你对他说，或者告诉我，You tell him, or tell me."

===== Subordinate compound sentences =====
The linked clauses in a coordinate compound sentence are not equivalent. There are three kinds of relationships between linked clauses: transitional, conditional, and causal.

====== The transitional relationship ======
Usually, the first clause is the subordinate clause, and the latter one is the major clause. The conjunction words that express a transitional relationship are "tom" (但是, but), "oms" (却, but), and "dagoms" (不然, otherwise), "tus" (但是, but), e.g.,

Uupans hou hei zok na, tom na hei qix.

Yesterday I go to him, but he go street

"昨天我到他家去，但是他已经上街去了，Yesterday I went to (find) him (at his house), but he had already hit the streets."

Na kweis vuek tun, oms dhas zuugheidhang.

She want sing a song, but fear shame

"她想唱歌，又怕害羞，She wants to sing, but fears embarrassment."

Kweis o goms o dhat, dagoms beuu blongs.

Want learn then learn well, otherwise go back home

"要学就真正地学，不然就回家去，(If you) want to learn, then learn (it) well, otherwise, go back home."

====== The conditional relationship ======
Usually, the first clause is the subordinate clause indicating the condition, and the latter one is the major clause expressing the consequence. The conjunction words that express a conditional relationship are "laeis" (如果, if), "dalunx" (无论, no matter what), e.g.,

Dalunx na rien dhongras, hou ngan hei.

no matter what he say how, I also go

"不管他怎样说，我都去，No matter what he says, I'll also go."

Laeis na da buuen, dhes fan hei gongx na.

If he not come, I then go find him

"如果他不来，我就去找他，If he doesn't come, then I'll go find him."

Laeis zaux tax, hou goms lax.

If have/there is rice, I then eat

"如果有饭，我就吃，If there is rice, then I (will) eat."

Laeis na euu, meuu goms waeix ku hou bas.

If he agree, you then tell to me accent

"如果他答应，你就告诉我吧，If he agrees, then (you) tell me."

Sometimes, the conditional sentence does not need a conjunction word, e.g.,

Tuuen kaux vuek gong, nge zaux gan zaux jien.

Out strength do work, must have money have money

"努力工作，一定会有金钱，(If you) use strength to work, (you) will have money."

====== The causal relationship ======
Usually, the first clause is the major clause indicating the result, and the latter one is the subordinate clause expressing the cause. The conjunction words that express a causal relationship are "hans" (因为, because), "dagoms" (不然, otherwise), e.g.,

Fas fun yous hei, dagoms ia cok.

Sky rain don't go otherwise gain/get sickness

"天下雨了，别去，不然要得病，It's raining, don't go, otherwise (you'll) get sick."

Dhes da hei, hans dhes cok bhe.

I not go because I sick accent

"我不去，因为我病了，I'm not going because I'm sick."

Hou beuu bat dhoei, hans tuut bhaeis.

I come back take rope, because break totally

"我回来拿绳子，因为全断了，I came back to take a rope, because (my rope is) totally broken."

Sometimes, the word "hans" also can be used in a conditional clause, e.g.,

Jieng, hans hloei ges fa ngan duuengx.

Success, no matter what much price/cost we also give

"能成功的话，那么多少钱我们都给，(Achieve) success, no matter how much it costs."

When the loan words "ienxuis…dosdzis"are used to present the cause-result relationship, the causal clause is placed before the result clause, e.g.,

Ienxuis boux neix fas raenx, dosdzis daenslieng aiszangs peek.

Because year this sky dry, so produce not so high

"因为今年天旱，所以产量不太高，Because this year it (is) dry, (so) the produce (is) not so much."

===== Compressed compound sentences =====
In view of idea expressed, the compressed sentence is a compound sentence; in view of construction, it is a simple sentence.

Dhes ghais meuu vuek meshes goms vuek meshes.

I tell you do what then do what

"我叫你做什么就做什么，Whatever I tell you to do, do (it)."

Hou kweis rien oms dhas.

I want say but fear

"我想说又害怕，I want to speak but (I) fear (to say it)."

Na faets ngop faets hlenyvis.

He more... think more... happy

"他越想越高兴，The more he thinks the more happy he is."

Bou neix luuengx bhoux luuengx ghweis.

Pig this more... feed more... fat

"这只猪越喂越肥，The more this pig is fed the fatter it is."

Na lax vuek lax dzuuns.

He more... do more... fast

"他越做越快，The more he works the faster he gets/becomes."

Aeu ceeng buuen ceeng hloei.

He more... come more... many

"人越来越多，The people coming (are) more and more."

=== Sentence types and their basic rules ===
According to the function and mood, Hlai sentences can be classified as declarative sentences, interrogative sentences, imperative sentences, and exclamatory sentences.

==== Declarative sentence ====
===== Affirmative sentence =====
Hou kweis hei ang.

I will go hilly field

"我要去山栏地，I will go to the hilly field."

Neix man veengs na.

This is shirt/top her/his

"这是他/她的衣服，This is her/his shirt/top."

Sometimes, the linking verb is omitted, e.g.,

Neix veengs na.

This shirt/top her/his

"这是他/她的衣服，This (is) her/his shirt/top."

===== Negative sentence =====
Neix ghwaix veengs na.

This is not shirt/top her/his

"这不是他/她的衣服，This is not her/his shirt."

Na da buuen zo.

He not come accent

"他还没来呢，He has not come yet."

==== Interrogative sentence ====
===== Using interrogative pronouns =====
There are several interrogative pronouns that are used: "uuras/asras" (谁, who?), "meshes" (什么, what?), "dhongras" (怎样, how?), "ras" (哪，如何, where? which? how?), "qiras" (何时, when?), and "hloeiras" (多少, How much/many?), e.g.,

Neix veengs asras?

This shirt/top who?

"这是谁的衣服，Whose shirt is this?"

Uuras uengx hou hei?

Who with me go?

"谁跟我去？Who(will) go with me?"

Neix man meshes?

This is what?

"这是什么？What is this?"

Vuek dhongras naus dhiu?

Do how just right?

"怎么样做才好？How should it be done, so that it will be done right?"

Meuu hei zok ras?

You go to/toward where?

"你去哪儿？Where are you heading?"

Na qiras buuen?

He when come?

"他何时来？When (will) he come?"

zaux hloeiras zuen uucok?

Have how many classifier sick

"有几个病号？How many (people) are sick?"

===== Using interrogative accent words =====
These questions require an answer: "Yes or no".

Ghwaix na bas?

Is not him accent

"不是他吧？It is not him, right?"

Neix guu meuu hos?

This belong to you accent

"这是你的吗？Does this belong to you?"

Meuu bhaeis lax tax hixhos?

You already eat rice accent

"你已经吃过饭了吗？Did you already eat (rice)?"

(There are several more words used in the interrogative mood, so please see the section on accented words.)

===== Using negation words ("da") =====
Meuu kweis hei da?

You will go NEG?

"你要去吗？Won't you go?"

Meuu kweis da?

You be willing to NEG?

"你愿意吗？Aren't you willing?"

Meuu kweis laeis hisdhop da?

You want see movie NEG?

"你要看电影吗？Don't you want to see a movie?"

Gong neix hleny da?

Stuff this good NEG?

"这东西好吗？Isn't this stuff good?"

The conjunction word "cuus/cas" can be added before the negative words "da" to express a question, e.g.,

Meuu qieng dheuu cuus da?

You want take or not?

"你想拿吗？Do you want to take (it) or not?"

Meuu bhaeis lax cuus da?

You already eat or not?

"你已经吃了吗？Have you already eaten or not?"

Veengs neix hleny cas da?

shirt/top this good or not?

"这件衣服好吗？Is this shirt/top good or not?"

===== Using conjunction words ("cuus/cas") =====
The conjunction word "cuus/cas" can be added between two options to express a question, e.g.,

Meuu dheuu cuus ais?

You want or don't want?

"你要不要？Do you want (it) or not?"

Fa caem cuus bhiek?

We carry with hands or carry on shoulders?

"我们抬还是扛？Should we carry (it) with (our) hands or on (our) shoulders?"

Dhat cas tuas?

Genuine/real/true or false/fake?

"真的还是假的？Are you telling the truth, or did you make it up?"

Another related conjunction word "cuusnaus/casnus" can be added between two options to express a question, e.g.,

Na hei cuusnaus hou hei？

He go or I go?

"他去还是我去？Will he go or should I go?"

==== Imperative sentence ====
When a speaker demonstrates a request or a command, usually he will express it with an accent. When the subject is omitted, it can become a one word sentence, e.g.,

Buuen!

Come

"来！Come！"

Uuhaux laus zuucoeis bas.

tomorrow pick litchi (fruit) accent

"明天摘荔枝吧！Tomorrow let's (finish) pick(ing) litchi (=a kind of fruit)!"

Uengxtoengs dzuuns buuen res!

Everyone quickly come accent

"大家快来吧！Everyone, come quickly!"

(There are several more words used in the imperative mood, so please see the section on accented words.)

When a speaker expresses a prohibition, usually the adverbial word "yous" (别, don't) is used.

Yous vuek!

Don't do

"别做！Quit doing that!"

==== Exclamatory sentence ====
There are several words used in the exclamatory mood, like "ho", "a", "aei", "aidzo", "aiho", "euu", and "o". These words strongly express the speaker's feelings.

===== An accented word in one word sentence =====
Euu! Hauux bhe!

Yes! That is (it)!

"嗯！是！Yes! That's it!"

Aei! Dhongras vuek naus hleny?

Oh my! How do just/then good

"哎哟！怎么做才好？Oh my! What's a good way to do this?"

===== An accented word follows one word or one phrase =====
Cok ho!

Pain accent

"疼啊！Ouch!"

Hleny hloei ho!

good/so many accent

"好多啊！So many!"

===== An accented word at the end of a sentence =====
Aidzo! Keuuhwoek ho!

Oh my! Poor accent

"哎哟！可惜啊！Oh (my)! Poor (guy)!"

Tau bhaeis poens a!

Pot already break accent

"锅已经破了！The pot broke!"

Bheuucai neix hleny lax ho!

Vegetable this good eat accent

"这菜好吃啊！This vegetable (=dish) (is) good to eat (=delicious)!"

Noms neix ghan a!

Water this cold accent

"这水凉啊！This water is cold!"

(There are several more words used in the exclamatory mood, so please see the section on accented words.)

== Influence of Chinese grammar ==
Due to the frequent contacts made between the Li (黎族) and the Han (汉族) over a relatively lengthy stretch of time, the Hlai language has been influenced by the Chinese language and its grammar. As previously mentioned, the Hlai counting system for dates, ordinal numbers, and measurements have been influenced by Chinese. In this chapter, the Chinese influence in Hlai's word order of attribute phrases, verb-object-complement phrases, and interrogative sentences is discussed.

=== Attribute phrases ===
Nouns act as head words, and the attribute word is a number. Natively, the number should be placed before the head word. But, due to the Chinese influence, the number can be placed after the head word, e.g.,

Original order	Influenced order
三 只 野猪 fus lang laty three CLF boar "three boars"	野猪 三 只 laty fus lang boar three CLF "three boars"
一 个 果子 zuu hom coem one CLF fruit "one fruit"	果子 一 个 coem zuu hom fruit one CLF "one fruit"
两 条 竹子 hlaus dhanx roenx two CLF bamboo "two bamboo"	竹子 两 条 roenx hlaus dhanx bamboo two CLF "two bamboo"

When nouns act as head words, and the attribute words are demonstrative pronouns and numbers, the number is placed before the head word and the demonstrative pronoun after the head word. But, due to Chinese influence, the word order has become more like the word order in Chinese, e.g.,

Original order	Influenced order
zuu hom ngaen neix one CLF pillow DEM "this pillow"	这 一 个 枕头 neix zuu hom ngaen DEM one CLF pillow "this pillow"
dom fans veengs hauux six CLF shirt DEM "these six shirts"	那 六 件 衣服 hauux dom fans veengs DEM six CLF shirt "these six shirts"
tou kuuengx zuuyunx max seven CLF coconut DEM "those seven coconut tree"	那 七 棵 椰子树 max tou kuuengx zuuyunx DEM seven CLF coconut "those seven coconut tree"

When two nouns are placed together as an attribute phrase, the front noun is the head word, and the back one the attribute word. However, due to Chinese influence, the word order can be changed, but only when applied to loan word attribute phrases, e.g.,

Original order	Influenced order
dengs Haeisnaems province Hainan "Hainan province"	海南 省 Haeisnaems dengs Hainan province "Hainan province"
gwaeis Lokdhongs county Ledong "Ledong county"	乐东 县 Lokdhongs gwaeis Ledong county "Ledong county"
dhiens Bhausdzius township Baoyou "Baoyou township"	抱由 镇 Bhausdzius dhiens Baoyou township "Baoyou township"

Another kind of attribute phrase is where the noun is the head word and the adjective is the attribute word. When the words in the phrase are all loan words, the word order follows the Chinese one, e.g.,

新 中国
dienx Dongxgok
new China
"new China"

新 裙子
dienx gun
new skirt
"new skirt"

大 救星
dhuax giuscex
big savior
"great savior"

However, when the words in the phrase are not all loanwords, the adjective is placed after the noun, e.g.,

Dongxgok baen
China new
"new China"

neix man gun baen.
DEM.this is skirt new
"This is a new skirt."

giuscex long
savior big
"great savior"

=== Verb-object-complement phrases ===
When verbs act as head words, the word order is verb-object-complement. But, due to Chinese influence, the word order, verb-complement-object has also been adopted, e.g.,

Original order	Influenced order
lax tax bhaeis eat rice finished "finished eating"	吃 完 饭 lax bhaeis tax eat finished rice "finished eating"
vuek gong bhaeis do work finished "finished working"	做 完 工 vuek bhaeis gong do finished work "finished working"
lax bhiengx bhaeis eat {rice wine} finished "finished drinking"	吃 完 酒 lax bhaeis bhiengx eat finished {rice wine} "finished drinking"

=== Interrogative sentences ===
The native ways to denote a question in the Hlai language are using interrogative pronouns, interrogative accents, or placing the negation word da at the end of a sentence. However, due to Chinese influence, a new word order has appeared, which is, verb (head word) + negation + verb, e.g.,

你 去 不 去？
Meuu hei da hei?
You go NEG go
"Are you going?"

=== The possessive auxiliary word gaeis ===
The native possessive auxiliary word in Hlai is guu. In the Chinese language, the possessive auxiliary word is gaeis, and both its usage and function have been imputed into the Hlai language, e.g.,

北京 的 颐和园
Bhakgengs gaeis Ihwashueis
Beijing AUX.POSS {the name of emperor's Summer Palace}
"Beijing's Summer Palace"

海南 的 乐东 县
Haeisnaems gaeis Lokdhongs gwaeis
Hainan AUX.POSS Ledong township
"Hainan's Ledong township"

早晨 的 太阳
gaeusdhom gaeis cahwan
morning AUX.POSS sun
"the morning's sun"

== Bibliography ==
- Mingying Wen 文明英; Jing Wen 文京 (2006). Liyu Jichu Jiaocheng 黎语基础教程. Beijing 北京: Central University for Nationalities Press 中央民族大学出版社. ISBN 9787811080018.
- Mingying Wen 文明英; Jing Wen 文京 (2009). Liyu Changpian Huayu Cailiaoji 黎语长篇话语材料集. Beijing 北京: Central University for Nationalities Press 中央民族大学出版社. ISBN 9787811086980.
- Zhongshu Yuan 苑中树 (1994). Outline of Hlai language Grammar 黎语语法纲要. Beijing 北京: Central University for Nationalities Press 中央民族大学出版社. ISBN 7810018922.
