= Classical Chinese lexicon =

Almost all lexemes in Classical Chinese are individual characters one spoken syllable in length. This contrasts with modern Chinese dialects where two-syllable words are extremely common. Chinese has acquired many polysyllabic words in order to disambiguate monosyllabic words that sounded different in earlier forms of Chinese but identical in one region or another during later periods. Because Classical Chinese is based on the literary examples of ancient Chinese literature, it has almost none of the two-syllable words present in modern varieties of Chinese.

Classical Chinese has more pronouns compared to the modern vernacular. In particular, whereas Mandarin has one general character to refer to the first-person pronoun, Literary Chinese has several, many of which are used as part of honorific language, and several of which have different grammatical uses (first-person collective, first-person possessive, etc.).

In syntax, Classical Chinese words are not restrictively categorized into parts of speech: nouns used as verbs, adjectives used as nouns, and so on. There is no copula in Classical Chinese; 是 (shì) is a copula in modern Chinese but in old Chinese it was originally a near demonstrative ('this'), the modern Chinese equivalent of which is 這 (zhè).

Beyond grammar and vocabulary differences, Classical Chinese can be distinguished by literary and cultural differences: an effort to maintain parallelism and rhythm, even in prose works, and extensive use of literary and cultural allusions, thereby also contributing to brevity.

Many final particles (歇語字; xiēyǔzì) and interrogative particles are found in Literary Chinese.

== Function words ==
Char.	Function	Example
而	Conjunction: 又 'also'; 而且 'and'; 卻 'but'; 如果 'if'; 接著 'followed by'	學而時習之，不亦悅乎。 Learn and practice often, is it not a pleasure? — Analects
而	Pronoun: 你的 'your'	
而	Alternative for 'can' 能	
何	Pronoun, often before the modal particles 哉 and 也	
何	'why' 為什麼; 'where' 哪裡; 'what' 什麼	
何	Adverb, or used in the first sentence before the verb, that question can be translated as 'how' 怎麼	
乎	Preposition: 於	
乎	Modal particle expressing doubt, praise, surprise, or to highlight the word in front	
乎	Expresses a question when placed at the end of a phrase	人不知而不慍，不亦君子乎。 Others fail to understand you, but you are not angered, is this not the mark of a gentleman?
乃	Preposition: 於	
乃	Modal particle expressing doubt, praise, surprise, or to highlight the word in front	
乃	Expresses a question when placed at the end of a phrase	
爾	'then'; 'indeed'; 'after all'; 'namely'	乃懼，復造善脈者診之。 Then he got scared, and found someone who was good at pulse-reading to diagnose it. — Chapter 23 of Volume 2 of Pu Songling's 聊齋志異
爾	Pronoun: 'you'; 'your	
爲	Preposition, that the object, which is equivalent to 'substitute for', 'give', 'once upon a time', 'opposed', 'with', 'with regards to'	
爲	Preposition pointed out that the reason for the equivalent of 'because'	
爲	Preposition, that the passive, which is equivalent to 'be'	
爲	Verb: 'make'; 'for'; 'become'	
爲	Preposition: 'at'; 'when'	
爲	Modal particle, often with the pronouns 何 or 焉	
焉	Tone for the end of the sentence, equivalent to 啊 or 呢	生而有疾惡焉，順是，故殘賊生而忠信亡焉。 Humans were born with hatred; because people followed it, cruelty and brutality grew within them, and faithfulness died out (end of sentence).
焉	Tone of the words express a standstill for the sentence	
焉	Pronoun: 'he'; 'them'; 'it'; 'here'; 'where'	
焉	Pronoun equivalent to: 豈 'how', 'what'; 如何 'what'	
以	Preposition indicating reason equivalent to 'in order to'. Originally derived from a noun meaning 'reason'.	故常無欲，以觀其妙。 Therefore, (people) often keep themselves void of desire, in order to see the secret of life. — Tao Te Ching 何其久也？必有以也！ Why does he take this long? There must be a reason! — "Mao Qiu", Classic of Poetry
以	Preposition indicating means: 'with'; 'using'	殺人以挺與刃，有以異乎？ To kill using a club or blade, is there anything to distinguish them? — Mencius
以	Preposition introducing action, where activity takes place within a certain period and location, equivalent to 'at', 'from'	文以五月五日生。 Wen was born on the fifth day of the fifth month. — Records of the Grand Historian
以	Conjunction to indicate juxtaposition, a linked relationship, objective, or causality; similar to 而.	談笑以死。 They talked with laughter before they died (were executed). — Zhang Pu
其	Third-person possessive pronoun	未有仁而遺其親者也。 There has never been a humane person who abandoned his parents. — Mencius
其	Modal particle expressing doubt or possibility	其無後乎？ Surely he must not have any descendants? — Mencius
其	Modal particle expressing a softened imperative: an exhortation or wish (rather than a command)	其無廢先君之功！ Please do not destroy the previous sovereign's achievements! — Zuo Zhuan
且	'and'; 'furthermore'	
若	'if'; 'assuming that'	夕惕若厲。 — Being careful every day as if there were dangers.
所	'that which'	
也	Used at the end of the sentence to provide a positive, emphasizing or doubtful tone. If used within the sentence, indicates a pause to delay the mood.	其西有大山，天下至高者也。 In the west of it there is a large mountain, (which is) the tallest under heaven.
因	'rely on'; 'build on'; 'inherit'	為高必因丘陵。 To build high, one necessarily relies on hills and mounts. — Mencius 周因於殷禮。 Zhou inherits the rituals of Yin. — Analects
于	Preposition for place, reason; expression of action behaviour and the introduction of premises, time, motion, target, location, relationship between people, introduction to the object of comparison or analogy.	
與	'and'; 'with'; 'to'; 'for'; 'give'	
則	Conjunction: 'just'; 'still, but...'; 'however'; 'in that case'	
者	Particle referring to people, objects, times, locations, etc. When placed after the subject, indicates a slight pause, or expresses determination.	
之	Third-person object pronoun	民不畏死，奈何以死懼之？ The people do not fear death; how can one frighten them with it? — Tao Te Ching
之	Near demonstrative pronoun, 'this'	之子于歸，宜其室家。This lady goes to her marriage, befitting for her chamber and house. — "Tao Yao", Classic of Poetry
之	Possessive marker for personal pronouns similar to modern 的.	孫子曰：兵者，國之大事，死生之地，存亡之道，不可不察也。 Sun Tzu says: Of war, life-and-death's field, survival and extinction's way, should not be unexamined. The Art of War
之	Nominalization marker inserted between subject and predicate to convert a clause into a noun phrase. Can be thought of as an extension of (2) above.	喜怒哀樂之動乎中，必見乎外。 The welling of happiness, anger, grief, or pleasure in one's heart is always outwardly expressed.
之	Transitive verb 'to go'	吾欲之南海，如何？ I wish to go to the southern seas; what do you think?
曰	Speech indicator similar to 'says' or 'said'	翁笑曰：平昔不相往還，何由遺魂吾家？The old man laughed and said, "In normal days we don't have much of a relation, why would you want to call back the dead's soul in my house?"
亦	'also', 'too'	
故	'therefore'; 'cause'; 'reason'; 'happening'; 'instance'	何以故？ Why is this? (lit. 'what caused this?')
將	Adverb: indicating future action ('will'); indicating uncertainty ('if')	將入門。 When they were about to enter the gate.
矣	Particle indicating completion	否則我終泯而子亦不起矣。 Otherwise, I will ultimately disappear, and you will also not rise again. — Truyền kỳ mạn lục
蓋	Sentence-initial particle indicating uncertainty	蓋莫之爲而爲者天。 It seems that one who does not do anything, but does it is heavenly. — Truyền kỳ mạn lục
猶	'to be like'; 'still'	想彼念卿亦猶卿念彼。 Missing her, I remember you, also just like when I missed you, I remember her. — Truyền kỳ mạn lục

== Content words ==
As with function words, there are many differences between the content words of Classical Chinese and those of Baihua. Below are synonyms used in the two registers. Some Classical Chinese words can have more than one meaning.

However, Classical Chinese words still exist among many chengyu, or Chinese idioms.

The Classical Chinese words and examples will be written in traditional characters, and the modern vernacular will be written in both simplified and traditional characters.

Classical Chinese word	Part of speech	Baihua word (simplified)	Baihua word (traditional)	Meaning	Classical Chinese example	Baihua translation (simplified)	Baihua translation (traditional)	English meaning
日	noun	太阳	太陽	sun	雲開見日	拔开云雾，见到太阳。	拔開雲霧，見到太陽。	The clouds opened and the sun shone through.
目	noun	眼睛	眼睛	eye	每毙一人掩其目	因此每射杀一个人，都会闭上眼睛不忍直视。	因此每射殺一個人，都會閉上眼睛不忍直視。	Whenever he killed a man, he covered his eyes.
虎	noun	老虎	老虎	tiger	不入虎穴焉得虎子	不敢进入虎穴，就不能捉到老虎的崽子。	不敢進入虎穴，就不能捉到老虎的崽子。	One may only catch the tiger cub by entering the tiger's den.
犬	noun	狗	狗	dog	一犬吠形，百犬吠聲	一只狗看到影子叫起来，很多狗也跟着乱叫。	一隻狗看到影子叫起來，很多狗也跟著亂叫。	One barking dog sets all the street abark.

== See also ==
- Chinese adjectives
- Chinese particles
- Chinese verbs
- Classical Chinese grammar

== Sources ==
=== Works cited ===
- 《新高中文言手册》 （1998年 北京华书）
- 《新华字典》 （第10版
