= Classical Chinese grammar =

The term "Classical Chinese" refers to the written language of the classical period of Chinese literature, from the end of the Spring and Autumn period (early 5th century BC) to the founding of the Qin dynasty in 221 BC—or in a broader sense to the end of the Han dynasty in 220 AD. "Classical Chinese" is also often used for the higher language register used in writing during most of the following centuries, a register generally referred to as "Literary Chinese"; this article focuses on the grammar used during the classical period.

This article uses modern Standard Chinese readings of characters, following the common practice among scholars, even though it is also possible to read Classical Chinese using the literary readings of other modern Chinese varieties—for example, Cantonese readings are common in Hong Kong—or other languages of the Sinosphere or even a historical reconstruction of character readings used in previous centuries.

Classical Chinese's most obvious contrast with modern written vernacular Chinese is that the former rarely uses words of more than one character; nearly all Classical words are one character in length. This stands directly in contrast with vernacular Chinese, in which two-character words are extremely common. This phenomenon exists in part because compounding was used to resolve ambiguities as sound changes created homophones among words.

== Typology ==
Unlike Old Chinese, Classical Chinese has long been noted for the absence of inflectional morphology: nouns and adjectives do not inflect for case, definiteness, gender, specificity or number; neither do verbs inflect for person, number, tense, aspect, telicity, valency, evidentiality or voice. However, in terms of derivational morphology, it makes use of compounding, reduplication and perhaps affixation, although not in a productive way. There is also an extensive use of zero-derivation.

The basic constituent order of Classical Chinese is subject-verb-object (SVO), but is not fully consistent: there are particular situations where the VS and OV word orders appear. Topic-and-comment constructions are often used. Neither a topic, nor the subject nor objects are mandatory, being often dropped when their meaning is understood (pragmatically inferable), and copular sentences often do not have a verb.

Within a noun phrase, demonstratives, quantifying determiners, adjectives, possessors and relative clauses precede the head noun, while cardinal numbers can appear before or after the noun they modify. Within a verb phrase, adverbs usually appear before a verb. The language, as analyzed in this article, uses coverbs (in a serial verb construction) and postpositions. Classical Chinese makes heavy use of parataxis where English would use a dependent clause; however, there are means to form dependent clauses, some of which appear before the main clause while others appear after. There are also a number of sentence-final particles.

Two simple coordinated nouns can be joined with a conjunction, but this is not always the case. This, combined with the fact that two nouns in a possessor-possessed construction are not always marked for their functions either, can lead to ambiguity: 山林 shān lín (literally: "mountain forest") could mean either "mountains and forests" or "the forest of a mountain".

With the absence of inflectional morphology, Classical Chinese is largely a zero-marking language, except that possessors and relative clauses are usually dependent-marked with a grammatical particle.

Negation is achieved by placing a negative particle before the verb. Yes–no questions are marked with a sentence-final particle, while wh-questions are marked with in-situ interrogative pronouns. There are a number of passive constructions, but passives are sometimes not marked differently from active constructions, at least when written.

== Word class flexibility ==
The Classical Chinese lexicon has been traditionally divided into two large categories: content words (實字 shí zì, literally: "substantial words") and function words (虛字 xū zì, literally: "empty words"). Scholars of Classical Chinese grammar notably disagree on how to further divide these two categories exactly, but a classification using word classes similar to those of Latin (noun, adjective, verb, pronoun, etc.) has been common. However, this remains debated, as many words can be used as multiple parts of speech, like so:

- adjective used as noun: 聖益聖 shèng yì shèng; lit: "wise increase wise", actually means: "the wise becomes wiser"
- adjective used as verb: 勝地不常 shèngdì bù cháng; lit: "a good place not pertinent", actually means: "a good place will not be pertinent"
- adjective used as adverb: 白費 báifèi; lit: "vain cost", i.e. "vainly cost (subject) ... "
- noun used as verb: 順流而東也 shùnliú ér dōng yě; lit: "along the river East", actually means: "going down the river to the East"
- noun used as adverbial: 犬坐於前 quǎn zuò yú qián; lit: "(a wolf) dog sit in the front", actually means: "(a wolf) is sitting in the front like a dog"
- verb used as noun (rare case): 乘奔御風 chéng bēn yùfēng; lit: "ride gallop or wind", actually means: "ride a galloping horse or wind"
- verb used as adverb (rare case): 爭割地 zhēng gēdì; lit: "compete cede territory", actually means: "cede territory spontaneously and actively"

== Verbs ==
While an English sentence can be divided into active voice or passive voice depending on the form of the verb within the sentence, the verbs in classical Chinese have several usages based on the relationship between the verb and the object. These are separated into yìdòng usage (Chinese: 意動; original meaning), shǐdòng usage (Chinese: 使動), wèidòng usage (Chinese: 為動), and bèidòng (Chinese: 被動; "passive") usage. Moreover, a verb does not change its form at different situations, with the exception of the beidong usage of verbs. Within the examples shown below, the words located within parentheses do not appear in the original Chinese sentence.

=== Yidong (意動) usage ===
In classical Chinese, it is common for nouns or adjectives to be used as verbs or adjectives, and most of these cases involve a yidong usage of verbs. One peculiarity is that a word that is originally a verb does not share the same usage. In addition, there are slight differences in meaning between the noun and the adjective in the usage.

For a noun, it becomes an action done by the subject which indicates the subjects opinion about the object in the form "consider (object) as + (the noun)".

{} 父 利 {其 然 也}
{} fù lì {qí rán yě}
(Zhongyong's) father profit {the thing}
The father considered the thing as profitable.

For an adjective, it becomes an observation in the form of "consider (object) (the adjective)".

漁 人 甚 異 之
yú rén shèn yì zhī
fish man very strange {the thing}
The fisherman considers the thing very strange.

=== Shidong (使動) usage ===
In this case, nouns, verbs and adjectives share usage, but with different meanings.

For a noun, it means "make ... + (the noun)". For instance:

先 破 秦 入 咸陽 者 王 之
xiān pò qín rù Xiányáng zhě wàng zhī
first defeat Qin enter Xianyang person crown him
"He who defeated Qin and entered Xianyang first would be crowned."

Literal translation: (Fulfilling the agreement that) the person who defeated the Qin dynasty and entered Xianyang first, [people] would king him.
(Note: Such scenarios are rare, though historical cases exist in ancient China. The translation of the sentence is rather controversial; the interpretation provided above represents the most widespread consensus.)

For a verb, it could mean "make... + do/done/to do", depending on the sentence. For instance:

- 泣孤舟之嫠婦

Literal translation: (The music was so sad that) cry the widow in a lonely boat
Semantic translation: (The music was so sad that it) made the widow in a lonely boat cry.

For an adjective, it means "make... + (the adjective)". For instance:

- 既來之，則安之

Literal translation: Since you have been here, then calm yourself here
Semantic translation: Since you have been here, make yourself calm here.

=== Weidong (爲動) usage ===
The following examples demonstrate weidong usage of verbs. Such usage may occur:

- to express a motion that is based on a purpose. For instance:

等死，死國可乎？

Literal translation: It's equally death (delay for work and protest the rule of the Qin dynasty), is die country an option?
Semantic translation: It's death in any case, is dying for the country an option?

- to express an action due to a particular reason. For instance:

便苦咳嗽

Literal translation: He suffer(v.) cough
Semantic translation: He suffered from a cough.

- to help the object do something. For instance:

自序其詩

Literal translation: Himself introduction his own poem
Semantic translation: He wrote the introduction to his own poem .

- to execute a motion to the object. For instance:

泣之三日

Literal translation: Cry it for three days
Semantic translation: Cry over it for three days.

== Pronouns ==
Pronouns can be separated into the following groups:

- Personal, e.g. 汝 rǔ 'you'
- Demonstrative: 此 cǐ, 斯 sī, 兹 zī 'this, these'; 彼 bǐ, 夫 fú 'that, those'; 之 zhī, 是 shì '(anaphoric) this, that'
- Reciprocal: 彼此 bǐcǐ 'each other'
- Reflexive: 己 jǐ, 身 shēn 'oneself, themselves'
- Interrogative, e.g. 誰 shéi 'who'
- Indefinite: 他 tuō 'another, others', 某 mǒu 'someone, so-and-so', 人 rén 'someone', 人人 rénrén 'everyone', 諸 zhū 'all'

Personal pronouns
1st person	吾 wú, 我 wǒ, 余 yú, 予 yú, 朕 zhèn
2nd person	爾 ěr, 汝/女 rǔ, 而 ér, 若 ruò
3rd person	之 zhī (accusative), 其 qí (genitive)

Classical Chinese did not distinguish number in some of its pronouns, for example, 我 wǒ could mean either 'I, me' or 'we, us'. There was no 3rd-person personal pronoun form that could be used in subject position, but the distal demonstrative 彼 bǐ 'that, those' and the anaphoric demonstrative 是 shì frequently take that role.

The use of some nouns as pronoun-like terms is also attested. Common examples in texts are the humble 臣 chén 'servant' in the 1st person, and 子 zǐ 'son; master' in the 2nd person.

Classical Chinese interrogative pronouns and adverbs are notably polysemic, many of them bearing multiple meanings.

Interrogative pronouns and adverbs
Classical Chinese	Translation
誰 shéi	who
孰 shú	which
何 hé	what, why, how
曷 hé	when, what
奚 xī, 胡 hú	where, how, why
安 ān, 焉 yān	where, how
盍 hé	why not
惡/烏 wū	where, in what

An example where this polysemy is exploited is found in a tale in the Zhuangzi (chapter 17). Zhuangzi is asked "how do you know this?" (with the interrogative 安 ān), but being unable to answer the question, intentionally misinterprets it as "where did you (get to) know this?".

== Core constituent order ==
The usual order of core constituents in Classical Chinese is subject, verb, and direct object (SVO).

吾 有 大 樹
wú yǒu dà shù
1 have big tree
"I have a large tree." (Zhuangzi 1.6)

Important exceptions to this basic order exist. When a verb is negated, a personal pronoun serving as the direct object is placed between the negative particle and the verb, leading to OV order.

我 未 之 見 也
wǒ wèi zhī jiàn yě
1 {not yet/never} 3 see STV
"I've never seen him." (Analects of Confucius 4.6)

Interrogative pronouns similarly generally precede the verb when they're the direct object.

之 二 蟲 又 何 知？
zhī ér chóng yòu hé zhī?
DEM two bug {in addition} what know
"What should these two bugs know in addition?" (Zhuangzi 1.1)

Exclamatory sentences, often but not necessarily marked with 哉 zāi, can optionally invert the order of the predicate's verbal phrase and the subject, leaving the subject afterwards.

賢 哉 回 也！
xián zāi Huí yě
sage EXCLAM Hui TOP
"Hui is a sage!" (Analects of Confucius 6.11)

惡 在 其 為 民 父 母 也！
wū zài qí wéi mín fù mǔ yě
{in what} {be in} 3.POSS be people father mother TOP
"Where is his being the father and mother of the People?!" (Mencius 1B.4)

In the latter example, the predicate's verbal phrase is 惡在 wū zài "to be/lie where", while the following words (until 也 yě) are the subject.

When the topic-and-comment construction is used, the topic phrase (which expresses what a sentence "is about": "Regarding this person...", "As for this thing...") goes at the front (start) of the sentence, often but not always marked with a topic particle, alternatively repeated by a resumptive pronoun.

夫 孝， 德 之 本 也
fú xiào, dé zhī běn yě
TOP {filial piety}, virtue POSS origin STV
"Regarding filial piety, it is the origin of moral character." (Classic of Filial Piety 1)

人 之 所 教， 我 亦 教 之
rén zhī suǒ jiāo, wǒ yì jiāo zhī
person POSS REL.PASS declare, 1 also declare 3
"What others profess, I will also profess (it)." (Tao Te Ching 42)

== Copular sentences ==
Classical Chinese typically does not use a copula verb to express positive nominal predication ("X is a/the Y"). Instead, it places two noun phrases (one of which could be a pronoun) followed by a final particle, usually 也 yě. The particle can be omitted but rarely is.

滕 小 國 也
Téng xiǎo guó yě
Teng small state STV
"The state of Teng is a minor state." (Mencius 1B.13)

天 之 生， 是 使 獨 也
tiān zhī shēng, shì shǐ dú yě
Heaven POSS {give life}, this CAUS one-footed STV
"Heaven giving [me] life, this is what made [me] one-footed." (Zhuangzi 3.13)

It is the above kind of sentence, with 是 shì serving to repeat the topic as a resumptive pronoun, that later led to the use of 是 shì as a copula (already in texts of the early Han dynasty).

However, Classical Chinese did not lack copula verbs, as it not only had the negative copula 非 fēi (used to express "X is not Y"), but also the positive 為 wéi. The final particle is commonly optional when these verbs are used.

子 非 我
zǐ fēi wǒ
2 {not be} 1
"You are not me." (Zhuangzi 17.7)

道 可 道， 非 常 道
dào kě dào, fēi cháng dào
way {can be} speak, {not be} common/constant way
"If the Way can be stated, it is not the constant way." (Tao Te Ching 1, transmitted version)

道 可 道 也， 非 恆 道 也
dào kě dào yě, fēi héng dào yě
way {can be} speak TOP, {not be} eternal way STV
"If the Way can be stated, it is not the eternal way." (Tao Te Ching 1, unearthed versions)

天 也， 非 人 也
tiān yě, fēi rén yě
Heaven STV, {not be} person STV
"It was Heaven, not someone." (Zhuangzi 3.13)

子 為 誰？
zǐ wéi shéi?
2 be who?
"Who are you?" (Analects of Confucius 18.6)

== See also ==
- Chinese adjectives
- Chinese grammar
- Chinese honorifics
- Chinese particles
- Chinese pronouns
- Chinese verbs
- Classical Chinese
- Classical Chinese lexicon
- Vernacular Chinese

== Sources ==
- Aldridge, Edith (2013). Battistella, Edwin; Schilling, Natalie (eds.). "Chinese Historical Syntax: Pre-Archaic and Archaic Chinese" (PDF). Language and Linguistics Compass: Historical Linguistics. 7 (1). John Wiley and Sons Ltd.: 58–77. doi:10.1111/lnc3.12007. Archived from the original (PDF) on 2020-08-29.
- Barnes, Archie; Starr, Don; Ormerod, Graham (2009). Du's Handbook of Classical Chinese Grammar. Great Britain: Alcuin Academics. ISBN 978-1904623748.
- Dawson, Raymond (1984). A New Introduction to Classical Chinese. Oxford: Clarendon Press. ISBN 978-0-19-815460-0.
- Norman, Jerry (1988). Chinese. Cambridge: Cambridge University Press. ISBN 0-521-29653-6.
- Peyraube, Alain (2008). "Ancient Chinese". In Woodard, Roger (ed.). The Cambridge Encyclopedia of the World's Ancient Languages. Cambridge, New York, Melbourne, Madrid, Cape Town, Singapore, São Paulo: Cambridge University Press. ISBN 978-0-521-56256-0.
- Pulleyblank, Edwin (1995). Outline of Classical Chinese Grammar. Vancouver: UBC Press. ISBN 0774805056.
- Schuessler, Axel (2007). ABC Etymological Dictionary of Old Chinese. Honolulu: University of Hawai'i Press. ISBN 978-0-8248-2975-9.
- Zádrapa, Lukáš (2011). Word Class Flexibility in Classical Chinese. Leiden and Boston: Brill. ISBN 9789004206311.
