= Cantonese grammar =

Cantonese is an analytic language in which the arrangement of words in a sentence is important to its meaning. A basic sentence is in the form of SVO, i.e. a subject is followed by a verb then by an object, though this order is often violated because Cantonese is a topic-prominent language. Unlike synthetic languages, seldom do words indicate time, gender and number by inflection. Instead, these concepts are expressed through adverbs, aspect markers, and particles, or are deduced from the context. Different particles are added to a sentence to further specify its status or intonation.

A verb itself indicates no tense. The time can be explicitly shown with time-indicating adverbs. Certain exceptions exist, however, according to the pragmatic interpretation of a verb's meaning. Additionally, an optional aspect particle can be appended to a verb to indicate the state of an event. Appending interrogative or exclamative particles to a sentence turns a sentence into a question or shows the attitudes of the speaker.

== Verbal aspect ==
In contrast to many European languages, Cantonese verbs are marked for aspect rather than tense—that is, whether an event has begun, is ongoing, or has been completed. Tense—where an event occurs within time, i.e. past, present, future—is specified through the use of time adverbs. In addition, verbal complements may convey aspectual distinctions, indicating whether an event is just beginning, is continuing, or at completion, and also the effect of the verb on its object(s).

Aspect particles are usually treated as suffixes bound to the verb. Aspect particles can also be added to an adjective and function as a verb "be (adjective)".

Aspect	Marker	Usage	Example
Perfective	咗 zo2	To emphasise a completed activity the result of which still applies to the present situation	我 喺 香港 住咗 一 年 ngo5 hai2 {hoeng1 gong2} {zyu6 zo2} jat1 nin4 I at/in {Hong Kong} live-PFV one year I have been living in Hong Kong for a year (and still live here)
Experiential	過 gwo3	To emphasise an activity completed in the indeterminate past which no longer applies to the present situation	我 喺 香港 住過 一 年 ngo5 hai2 {hoeng1 gong2} {zyu6gwo3} jat1 nin4 I at/in {Hong Kong} live-EXP one year I lived in Hong Kong for a year (but am now elsewhere)
Progressive	緊 gan2	To emphasise a dynamic activity which may undergo a change of state	我 著緊 衫 ngo5 {zoek3 gan2} saam1 I wear-PROG clothes I am putting on clothes
Durative	住 zyu6	To emphasise a continuous activity without a change of state	我 著住 衫 ngo5 {zoek3 zyu6} saam1 I wear-DUR clothes I am wearing clothes
Delimitative	吓 haa5	To emphasise an activity of brief duration	等 我 著吓 dang2 ngo5 {zoek3 haa5} Let me wear-DEL; Let me wear it for a while
Habitual	開 hoi1	To emphasise an activity protracted over a period of time to the point that it has become characteristic or habitual	我 做開 鐘點 嘅 ngo5 {zou6 hoi1} {zung1 dim2} ge3 I do-HAB part-time SFP; I normally work part-time
Inchoative	起 上 嚟 hei2 soeng5 lai4	To emphasise the beginning of an activity	個 阿咇 突然之間 喊起上嚟 go3 {aa3 bit6} {dat6 jin4 zi1 gaan1} {haam3 hei2 soeng5 lai4} CL baby suddenly cry-INCH; The baby suddenly began crying
Continuative	落 去 lok6 heoi3	To emphasise the continuation of an activity	你 唔 使 再 講落去 喇 nei5 m4 si2/sai2 zoi3 {gong2 lok6 heoi3} laa3 you NEG need again speak-CONT SFP; You don't have to go on speaking
Returning	返 faan2	To emphasise the return of the "supposed state". Meanings can include: "continue a paused action" or "return to" (Example 1) Note: When added to an adjective, it can also function as a verb of "becoming (adjective) again". (Example 2)	畀 返 啲 錢 我 bei2 faan1 di1 cin2 ngo5 Give back those money me Give me the money back 個 天 未 好 返 go3 tin1 mei6 hou2 faan1 the sky {not yet} good back The weather is not yet well

== Pronouns ==
Cantonese uses the following pronouns, which like in many other Sinitic languages, function as both nominative (English: I, he, we) and accusative (me, him, us):

	singular	plural
1st person	我 ngo5 I / me	我 哋 ngo5 dei6 we / us
2nd person	你 nei5 you (singular)	你 哋 nei5 dei6 you (plural)
3rd person	佢 keoi5 he / she / it	佢 哋 keoi5 dei6 they / them

== Copula ("to be") ==
States and qualities are generally expressed using stative verbs that do not require the verb "to be". For example, to say "I am hungry", one would say 我肚餓 ngo5 tou5 ngo6 (literally: I stomach hungry).

With noun complements, the verb 係 hai6 serves as the verb "to be".

尋 日 係 中 秋 節。
cam4 jat6 hai6 zung1 cau1 zit3
Yesterday was [the] Mid-Autumn festival

Another use of 係 is in cleft constructions for emphasis, much like the English construction "It's ... that ...". The sentence particle 嘅 ge3 is often found along with it.

佢 係 完 全 唔 識 講 廣 東 話 嘅。
keoi5 hai6 jyun4 cyun4 m4 sik1 gong2 Gwong2 dung1 waa^{6-2} ge
"(It is the case that) s/he doesn't know Cantonese at all."

To indicate location, the words 喺 hai2 (a "lazy" variation is 响 hoeng2) which are collectively known as the locatives or sometimes coverbs in Chinese linguistics, are used to express "to be at":

我 而 家 喺 圖 書 館。
ngo5 ji4 gaa1 hai2 tou4 syu1 gun2
I am at the library now

(Here 而家 ji4 gaa1 means "now".)

== Negations ==
Many negation words start with the sound m- in Cantonese; for example, 唔 m4 "not", 冇 mou5 "to not have (done something)", 未 mei6 "not yet". Verbs are negated by adding the character 唔 m4 in front of it. For example:

我 食 得 花生 ngo5 sik6 dak1 {faa1 sang1} 1SG {to eat} can peanut "I can eat peanuts"	$\longrightarrow$	我 唔 食 得 花生 ngo5 m4 sik6 dak1 {faa1 sang1} 1SG NEG {to eat} can peanut "I can't eat peanuts"

The exception is the word 有 jau5 'to have', which turns into 冇 mou5 'to not have' without the use of 唔 m4.

The negative imperative is formed by prefixing 唔好 m4 hou2 (also pronounced mou2) or 咪 mai5 in front of the verb:

唔 好 睇 戲
m4 hou2 tai2 hei3
"Don't watch movies"

咪 睇 戲
mai5 tai2 hei3
"Don't watch movies"

In contrast to the examples of sentential negation above where the entire sentence is negated, 唔 m4 can be used lexically to negate a single word. The negated word often differs slightly in meaning from the original word; that is, this lexical negation is a kind of derivation. Evidence for this is that they can be used with the perfective aspect particle 咗 zo2, which is not possible with sententially negated verbs.

見 {} 唔見
gin3 {} {m4 gin3}
"see" $\longrightarrow$ "lose"

記得 {} 唔記得
{gei3 dak1} {} {m4 gei3 dak1}
"remember" $\longrightarrow$ "forget"

錯 {} 唔錯 / 冇錯
co3 {} {m4 co3} / {mou5 co3}
"wrong" $\longrightarrow$ {"pretty good; not bad"} / "right"

我 唔 見 咗 我 本 書
ngo5 m4 gin3 zo2 ngo5 bun2 syu1
"I lost my book"

is perfectly acceptable, but

* 我 唔 食 咗 嘢
{} ngo5 m4 sik6 zo2 je5
"I did not eat"

is ungrammatical. (The correct expression should be 我冇食嘢 ngo5 mou5 sik6 je5: 我(I)冇(did not)食(eat)嘢(something/anything), but actually with an emphasis on not doing an action, as it is the negation of 我有食嘢 ngo5 jau5 sik6 je5: 我(I)有(did)食(eat)嘢(something/anything).)

== Questions ==
Questions are not formed by changing the word order as in English. Sentence final particles and certain interrogative constructions are used instead.

=== Yes–no questions ===
There are two ways to form a yes–no questions. One way is by the use of final particle and/or intonation alone. The question particle 呀 aa4 indicates surprise or disapproval. It tends to presuppose a positive answer.

吓? 你 下 個 禮 拜 放 假 呀?
Haa2? Nei5 haa6 go3 lai5 baai3 fong3 gaa3 aa4?
(What?) You are going on leave next week!? (The questioner is surprised that you are going on leave, or doesn't agree that you should.)

The particle 咩 me1 is exclusively interrogative, indicating surprise and used to check the truth of an unexpected state of affairs.

乜 你 唔 知 嘅 咩?
Mat1 nei5 m4 zi1 ge3 me1?
(You mean) you don't know?

A question may be indicated by a high rising intonation alone at the end of a question. (This intonation can be considered a nonsyllabic final particle indicating a question.) This intonation pattern usually modifies or exaggerates the basic tone of the last syllable. This type of question is used especially for echo, where the questioner repeats a statement out of surprise.

「我 唔 見 咗 條 鎖 匙」 「咩 話? 你 唔 見 咗 條 鎖 匙?」
"ngo5 m4 gin3 zo2 tiu4 so2 si4" "me1e5 waa6? nei5 m4 gin3 zo2 tiu4 so2 si4"
"I lost the key." "What? You lost the key?" (The last syllable of 鎖匙 so2 si4 "key" is pronounced longer, first finishing the low falling tone, then rising at the end like the high rising tone.)

The other way to form yes–no questions uses a special construction in which the head of the predicate, say X, is replaced by X-not-X. Final particles may be used in addition.

- For example

你 識 講 廣東話 nei5 sik1 gong2 {Gwong2 dung1 waa2} you know speak Cantonese; You know how to speak Cantonese.	$\longrightarrow$	你 識唔識 講 廣東話? nei5 {sik1 m4 sik1} gong2 {Gwong2 dung1 waa2} you {know not know} speak Cantonese; Do you know how speak Cantonese?

- As the negative form of 有 is 冇, the corresponding yes–no question uses the form 有冇:

有 紅綠燈. jau5 {hung4 luk6 dang1} have red-green-light There is a traffic light.	$\longrightarrow$	有冇 紅綠燈? {jau5 mou5} {hung4 luk6 dang1} {have not have} red-green-light Is there a traffic light?

- As for 係 hai6 ("to be"), the yes–no question often uses the contraction 係咪 hai6 mai6 (note that 咪 mai6 is not the prohibitive 咪 mai2) instead of 係唔係 hai6 m4 hai6.

佢 係 加拿大人. keoi5 hai6 {gaa1 naa4 daai6 jan4^{-2}} (s)he is Canada-person (S)he is a Canadian	$\longrightarrow$	佢 係咪 加拿大人? keoi5 {hai6 mai6} {gaa1 naa4 daai6 jan4^{-2}} (s)he {is isn't} Canada-person; Is (s)he a Canadian?

- With multisyllable verbs, only the first syllable is repeated:

你 鍾意 年糕. nei5 {zung1 ji3} {nin4 gou1} you like year-cake You like new-year cakes	$\longrightarrow$	你 鍾唔鍾意 年糕? nei5 {zung1 m4 zung1 ji3} {nin4 gou1} you {like not like} year-cake Do you like new-year cakes?

- A special case is when a question asking whether something has occurred is formed. In a negative sentence, the adverb 未 mei6 should precede the verb to indicate that the event has not yet occurred. In yes–no questions, however, 未 appears at the end of the question (but before the final particle, if exists):

你 去過 德國. nei5 {heoi3 gwo3} {Dak1 gwok3} you go-EXP Germany; You have been to Germany	$\longrightarrow$	你 去過 德國 未? nei5 {heoi3 gwo3} {Dak1 gwok3} mei^{6-2} you go-EXP Germany not-yet Have you ever been to Germany?

This form of yes–no questions looks less similar to the "X-not-X" type, but it is still considered in this type, because the "X" after "not" is omitted. For example, the example question above can be expanded as 你去過德國未去過? nei5 heoi3 gwo3 Dak1 gwok3 mei6 heoi3 gwo3.

A syntax of yes–no question in the form "X-not-X" is actually a contraction of a combination of syntax of an affirmative sentence and the syntax of a negative sentence.

=== Interrogative words ===
- The interrogative words are as follows:

Interrogative	Pronunciation	English equivalent
邊個	bin1 go3	who
乜(嘢) / 咩	mat1 (je5) / me1e5	what
邊度 / 邊處	bin1 dou6 / bin1 syu3	where
幾時	gei2 si4	when
點解	dim2 gaai2	why
點	dim2	how about
點(樣)	dim2 (joeng6-2)	how (in what manner)
幾	gei2	how (adjective)
幾多	gei2 do1	how many/much

Questions use exactly the same word order as in statements. For example: 你係邊個? nei5 hai6 bin1 go3 "who are you?" (literally "you are who"), 你幾時去邊度見邊個呀? nei5 gei2 si4 heoi3 bin1 dou6 gin3 bin1 go aa3 "When will you go? Where will you go and who will you meet?" (literally "you when go where meet who"). Note that more than one interrogative word can be used in a single sentence.

== Demonstratives ==
The proximal demonstrative ("this"), is 呢 ni1 / nei1, or more frequently in fast speech, 依 ji1 (+ measure word). For example:

呢本書 ni1/nei1 bun2 syu1 "this book"

依本書 ji1 bun2 syu1 "this book"

The distal demonstrative ("that") is 嗰 go2. For example:

嗰本書 go2 bun2 syu1 "that book"

Between the demonstrative and its noun, a certain word to link them must be used, whether a corresponding classifier for the noun for singular count nouns or 啲 di1 for plural count nouns and mass nouns:

呢架車 ni1/nei1 gaa3 ce1 "this car"

呢啲車 ni1/nei1 di1 ce1 "these cars"

嗰啲水 go2 di1 seoi2 "that water"

== Possessives ==
- For singular nouns, the word 嘅 ge3 is roughly equivalent to English " 's":

爸 爸 嘅 屋 企
baa^{1-4} baa1 ge3 uk1 kei2
"father's house"

- Plural nouns take 啲 di1:

你 啲 動 物
nei5 di1 dung6 mat6
"your animals"

N.B.: 啲 di1 is a very versatile word in Cantonese, besides pluralizing certain phrases, it can also mean "a little/few", e.g. 一啲 jat1 di1 "a little", or 早啲 zou2 di1 "earlier" (literally: early + (intensifier)).

- Possessive pronouns (i.e. "mine", "his", "hers") are formed by adding 嘅 ge3 after the pronoun.

係 佢 嘅 呀!
hai6 keoi2 ge3 aa3
"It's his!"
(呀 aa3 is a particle used to end affirmative statements)

However, in the case where there's an implied plural noun, one does not say:

* 係 佢 啲 呀!
{} hai6 keoi5 di1 aa3
"It's his!"

For example:

呢 啲 書 係 邊 個 嘅 呀？
ni1/nei1 di1 syu1 hai6 bin1 go3 ge3 aa3
"Whose books are these?"

係 佢 嘅 呀!
hai6 keoi5 ge3 aa3
"It's his! [referring to his books]"

嘅呀 ge3 aa3 is usually shortened in speech into one syllable, 㗎/嘎 gaa3.

- One could also say:

係 佢 啲 書 嚟 㗎！
hai6 keoi5 di1 syu1 lei4 gaa3
"It's his books!"

Both of these are generic possessives.

== Part of speech ==
The "part of speech" (POS) in Cantonese is different from English. Usually, a word can be used in different POS, without any changes. Example: 跑步 (Meaning: running), can be either verb or noun.

你可以喺公園跑步 (You can run at the park) [跑步 act as a verb]

跑步係我嘅興趣 (Running is my hobby) [跑步 act as a noun]

Moreover, particles may also change the POS.

E.g. 碗湯係熱嘅 OR 碗湯熱嘅 means: the bowl of soup is hot

But 碗湯係熱 means: the bowl of soup == (the concept of) hot, which does not make sense. (Since with 係, the word after it is understood as a noun but not adjective. 熱嘅 should be used, as the POS of 熱嘅 would only be adjective.)

This concept is similar in Mandarin Chinese, replacing 係 with 是, and replacing 嘅 with 的.

To alter the mood or lead other focuses, other final particles can also be used to substitute the particle 嘅, like 㗎.

== Differences from Mandarin grammar ==
The following Cantonese grammatical points are not found in Mandarin Chinese.

=== Word order ===
The direct object precedes the indirect object when using the verb 畀 bei2 "to give". In Mandarin verbs of giving, an indirect object precedes a direct object.

畀 嗰 本 書 我
bei2 go2 bun2 syu1 ngo5
give that CL book 1SG
"Give that book to me."

compared to Mandarin

給 我 這 本 書
gěi wǒ zhè běn shū
give 1SG this CL book
"Give me the book."

=== Morphology ===
The suffix used for the plural of pronouns, 哋 dei6, cannot associate with human nouns, unlike its similar Mandarin counterpart 們 -men. Mandarin 學生們 xuéshengmen "the students" would be rendered in Cantonese as:

(啲) 學生
(di1) {hok6 saang1}
(CL) students
"(the) students"

While the vocative use of 學生們 xuéshengmen "students" would be rendered in Cantonese as:

各位 學生
{gok3 wai2} {hok6 saang1}
everyone students
"Students!"

There are words in Mandarin which often require the suffixes 子 -zi or 頭 -tou, but they are normally optional in Cantonese, e.g. Mandarin 鞋子 xiézi "shoe" and 石頭 shítou "rock" can be 鞋 haai4 and 石 sek6 in Cantonese.

=== Classifiers ===
Classifiers can be used instead of the possessive 嘅 ge3 to indicate possession of a single object. Classifiers cannot be used this way in Mandarin.

佢 本 書
keoi5 bun2 syu1
3SG CL book
"his book"

Classifiers in both Cantonese and Mandarin can serve to individualize a noun, giving it a singular meaning (or plural in the case 啲 di1). However, such a construction in Mandarin will be of indefinite reference, unless a demonstrative (e.g. 這 zhè "this") or the universal quantifier (每 měi "every") is present. Furthermore, there are great limitations on using this construction in subject position in Mandarin. In Cantonese, these restrictions do not exist.

架 車 撻 唔 著
gaa3 ce1 taat3 m4 zoek6
CL car start not burn
"The car won't start," and it cannot be interpreted as "the cars".

=== Comparison ===
Adjective comparison in Cantonese is formed by adding the marker 過 gwo3 after an adjective. The adjective-marker construction serves as a transitive verb which takes the standard of comparison as an object.

佢 高 過 我
keoi5 gou1 gwo3 ngo5
3SG tall COMP 1SG
"He is taller than me."

In Standard Mandarin, comparison is marked by adding 比 bǐ, which serves in an adverbial phrase, leaving the adjective itself unchanged. The sentence above is translated into Mandarin as:

他 比 我 高
tā bǐ wǒ gāo
3SG COMP 1SG tall
"He is taller than me."

Alternatively the plural marker 啲 di1 alone (without the numeral 一 jat1) can be used use as the sole complement of the verbal adjective.

佢 高 啲
keoi5 gou1 di1
3SG tall COMP
"He is taller."

=== Aspect markers ===
Cantonese has a dedicated habitual aspect marker, 開 hoi1, with no similar counterpart in Mandarin.

我 住 開 香港
ngo5 zyu6 hoi1 {Hoeng1 Gong2}
1SG live HAB {Hong Kong}
"I've been living in Hong Kong."

=== Passives ===
In Cantonese, there must always be an agent in a passive, while in Mandarin this isn't the case. If there's no known or specific agent, Cantonese must at least use 人 jan4 "someone" as a dummy agent.

{筷 子} 畀 人 用 咗
{faai3 zi2} bei2 jan4 jung6 zo2
chopsticks by person use PRF
"the chopsticks have been used" (and not *筷子畀用咗 *faai3 zi2 bei2 jung6 zo2)

=== Sentence particles ===
It is possible to stack various of such particles one after the other, while Mandarin is restricted to sentence-final 了 and one particle.

你 食 咗 啦 吓?
nei5 sik6 zo2 laa3 haa5
2SG eat PRF COS Q
"You already ate, right?"

=== Pronouns ===
There is no gender distinction between the third person singulars of he, she and it in spoken or written Cantonese (佢); however in written Cantonese of formal register, which is similar to Mandarin, male and female may be distinguished with two different characters, 他 for male and 她 for female, as well as 它 for inanimate objects (including plants), 牠 for (non-human) animals, and 祂 for god(s), which all have the same pronunciation.

== See also ==
- Chinese grammar
