= Delimitative aspect =

The delimitative aspect is a grammatical aspect that indicates that a situation lasts only a certain amount of time. This aspect is comparable to "continuative aspect" and "durative aspect".

In Polish, stałem i gadałem 'I stood and chatted' contrasts with postałem i pogadałem 'I stood and chatted for a while' (the prefix po- marking the delimitative aspect in this example).

Delimitative aspect in Chinese is often marked by reduplication of the verb. For details see Chinese grammar§Aspects.
