= Chinese particles =

Particles in Chinese

Grammatical particles, or simply particles, are words that convey certain grammatical meanings. The term is often applied to words that are difficult to classify according to traditional grammar. Both Classical Chinese and Modern Standard Chinese make use of particles. In Chinese, particles are known as zhùcí (simplified Chinese: 助词; traditional Chinese: 助詞) or yǔzhùcí (语助词; 語助詞). They belong to function words (虚词; 虛詞; xūcí). In other words, they have no lexical meaning, but are used to indicate certain grammatical information. This contrasts with content words (实词; 實詞; shící). Particles in Chinese usually take the neutral tone.^{: p. 238}

== Studies by earlier authors ==
The first book devoted to the study of Chinese particles, 《語助》, was written by Lu Yi-Wei (盧以緯) in the period of the Yuan dynasty (1271–1368). Later important works include 《助字辨略》 (Some Notes on the Helping Words) by Liu Qi (劉淇) and 《經傳釋詞》 (Explanations of the Articles Found in the Classics) by Wang Yin-Zhi (王引之), both published during the Qing dynasty (1644–1911). These works focus on particles in the Confucius classics. Particles used in the vernacular literature did not draw much attention. The first work covering the particles found in the vernacular literature, 《詩詞曲語辭彙釋》 (Compilation and Explanations of the Colloquial Terms Found in Classical Poetry and Operas) by Zhang Xiang (張相), appeared posthumously in 1953.

== Linguistic sketch ==
Linguists often categorise Chinese particles into the following types:

- Structural particle (结构助词; 結構助詞; jiégòu zhùcí): This class of particles concern syntactic relations. The particles can be distinguished only in written form because they are usually pronounced the same.
  - 地(dì/de) is used to mark adverbials (狀語). E.g.: 安靜地睡著了 (ānjìng dì/de shuì zháo le) 'fell asleep quietly'
  - 得(dé/de) is used to mark verb complements (補語). E.g.: 學習得很認真 (xuéxí dé/de hěn rènzhēn) 'study very hard'
  - 的(dè/de), according to traditional analysis, is used to mark attributive (定語). It is often analysed as a nominaliser. E.g.: 書的封面很漂亮 (shū dè/de fēngmiàn hěn piàoliang) '(the) cover of the book (is) very beautiful'
- Aspectual particle (动态助词; 動態助詞; dòngtài zhùcí): Commonly dubbed aspect markers (動貌標記 or 動貌標誌), the particles signal grammatical aspect. The most renowned ones are the perfective 了(le), durative 著(zhe), durative 在(zaì), and experiential 過(guò).^{: p. 185}
- Modal particle (语气助词; 語氣助詞; yǔqì zhùcí): Often called sentence-final particles (句末助詞), the particles signal linguistic modality. Common ones include 了(le), 呢(ne), 吧(ba), and 嗎(mā/ma).^{: p. 238}

Particles like 的(dè/de) and 了(le) remain disputable since no satisfactory analysis is present.

== Illustrations ==
=== In classical Chinese ===
The function of a Chinese particle depends on its position in the sentence and on context. In many cases, the character used for a particle is a phonetic loan; therefore, the same particle could be written with different characters that share the same sound. For example, qí/jī (其, which originally represented the word jī "winnowing basket", now represented by the character 箕), a common particle in classical Chinese, has, among others, various meaning as listed below.

The following list provides examples of the functions of particles in Classical Chinese. Classical Chinese refers to the traditional style of written Chinese that is modelled on the Classics, such as Confucius's Analects. Thus, its usage of particles differs from that of modern varieties of Chinese.

Preceding syntactic element	Example sentence	Translation
qí/jī 其	Can have various functions depending on context.	
third-person possessive adjective: his/her/its/their	Gōng yù shàn qí shì, bì xiān lì qí qì. 工欲善其事，必先利其器。	A workman who wants to do his job well has to sharpen his tools first.
demonstrative adjective: that/those	Yǐ qí rén zhī dào, huán zhì qí rén zhī shēn. 以其人之道，還治其人之身。	Punish that person (someone) with his very own tricks.
suffix before adjective or verb	Běifēng qí liáng, yǔ xuě qí pāng. 北風其涼，雨雪其雱。	The northern wind is cool; the snow falls heavily.
to express doubt, uncertainty	Wú qí huán yě. Jūn qí wèn zhū shuǐ bīn. 吾其還也。 君其問諸水濱。	I had better go. You have to go to the riverside to make an inquiry, I'm afraid.
to express hope, command	Wúzi qí wú fèi xiān jūn zhī gōng! 吾子其無廢先君之功！	Boy, don't ruin the accomplishment of your father!
to form a rhetorical question	Yù jiāzhī zuì, qí wú cí hu? 欲加之罪，其無辭乎？	How could we fail to find words, when we want to accuse someone?
zhī 之	Possessive marker	
personal pronoun	Hérén zhī jiàn 何人之劍	Whose sword is this?
proper noun	Dōngfāng zhī guāng 東方之光	The light of the East
yǔ 与/與	Translates to: "and" (conjunction); "with" or "as with" (preposition).	
yě 也	Emphatic final particle.	
ér 而	Conjunction	
hu 乎	Can have various functions depending on context.: 1. A preposition 2. A modal particle to express doubt, praise, surprise, or to highlight the word in front 3. To express a question, when placed at the end of a phrase	
Phrases: question	Bù yì jūnzǐ hu 不亦君子乎	Is this not the mark of a gentleman?

=== In modern varieties of Chinese ===
==== Baihua ====
Written vernacular Chinese (白话; 白話; báihuà), refers to written Chinese that is based on the vernacular language used during the period between imperial China and the early 20th century. The use of particles in vernacular Chinese differs from that of Classical Chinese, as can be seen in the following examples. Usage of particles in modern Standard Chinese is similar to that illustrated here.

Preceding syntactic element	Example sentence	Translation
ba 吧	Emphatic final particle. Indicates a suggestion, or softens a command into a question. Equivalent to using a question tag like "aren't you?" or making a suggestion in the form of "let's (do something)".	
Verbs	Wǒmen zǒu ba. 我們走吧。	Let's go.
de 的	Used as a possession indicator, topic marker, nominalization. Vernacular Chinese equivalent of Classical 之.	
Nominal (noun or pronoun): possession	Zhāngsān de chē 張三的車	Zhangsan's car.
Adjective (stative verb): description	Piàoliang de nǚhái 漂亮的女孩	Pretty girl.
Verbal phrase: relativization (creates a relative clause)	Tiàowǔ de nǚhái 跳舞的女孩	The girl who dances (dancing girl)
děng 等	Translates to: "for example, things like, such as, etc., and so on". Used at the end of a list.	
Nouns	Shāngpǐn yǒu diànnǎo, shǒujī, yídòng yìngpán děng děng. 商品有電腦，手機，移動硬盤等等。	Products include computers, mobile phones, portable hard drives, et cetera. (The second 等 can be omitted)
gè 個	Used as a counter, also called a measure word.(general classifier) This is the most commonly used classifier, but anywhere from a few dozen to several hundred classifiers exist in Chinese.	
Number	Yī gè xiāngjiāo 一個香蕉	One banana
	Yī xiē xiāngjiāo 一些香蕉	Some bananas
Note: general classifier	All Chinese classifiers generally have the same usage, but different nouns use different measure words in different situations.	ie: 人(rén; person) generally uses 個(gè), but uses 位(wèi) for polite situations, 班(bān) for groups of people, and 輩(bèi) for generations of people, while 花(huā; flower) uses 支(zhī) for stalks of flowers and 束(shù) for bundles of flowers.
hái 還	Translates to: "also", "even", "still"	
Verbs	Wǒmen hái yǒu wèixīng píndào! 我們還有衛星頻道！	We also have satellite television channels!
Verbs	Tā hái zài shuìjiào ne. 他還在睡覺呢。	He is still sleeping.
hé 和	Translates to: "and" (conjunction); "with" or "as with" (preposition). Vernacular Chinese equivalent of Classical 與.	
Nouns: conjunction	Zhāng Sān hé Lǐ Sì shì wǒmen zuì cōngmíng de xuéshēng. 張三和李四是我們最聰明的學生。	Zhang San and Li Si are our most intelligent students.
kě 可	Translates to: "could", "-able"	
Verbs	Nǐ kěyǐ huí jiāle. 你可以回家了。	You can go home now.
Verbs	Kě'ài 可愛	Loveable (i.e. cute)
le 了	Used to indicate a completed action. Within informal language, can be alternatively replaced with 啦 la or 嘍 lou.	
Action	Tā sǐ le 他死了	He has died.
ma 嗎	Used as a question denominator.	
Phrases: question	Nǐ jiǎng gúoyǔ ma? 你講國語嗎？	Do you speak Mandarin?
shì 是	Used as the copula "to be"; as a topic marker.	
Nouns	Zhège nǚhái shì měiguó rén. 這個女孩是美國人。	This girl is an American.
yě 也	Translates to: "also"	
Nouns	Wǒ yěshì xuéshēng. 我也是學生。	I am also a student.
zhe 著	Used to indicate a continuing action.	
Action	Tā shuìzhejiào shí yǒurén qiāomén 他睡着覺時有人敲門	Someone knocked while he was sleeping.
zhǐ 只	Translates to: "only, just"	
Nouns	Zhǐyǒu chéngrén kěyǐ rù nèi. 只有成人可以入内。	Only adults are permitted to enter.

== See also ==
- Chinese exclamative particles
- Chinese pronouns
- Chinese adjectives
- Chinese verbs
- Chinese grammar
- Classical Chinese grammar
- Okinawan particles
- Japanese particles
- Korean particles
