= Chinese adjectives =

Adjectives in Chinese

Chinese adjectives (simplified Chinese: 形容词; traditional Chinese: 形容詞; pinyin: xíngróngcí) differ from adjectives in English in that they can be used as verbs (for example 天黑了; tiān hēi le; lit. "sky black _{perfective}") and thus linguists sometimes prefer to use the terms static or stative verb to describe them.

== Attributive (before nouns) ==
When a noun is modified using an adjective, the associative particle 的 de is inserted between the adjective and the noun. For example, 高兴的孩子 gāo xìng de hái zi "happy child". 的 is sometimes omitted to reduce repetitiveness (e.g., two or more instances of 的 within a sentence); it is also omitted in some established adjective-noun pairs to improve sentence flow (e.g., the TV show 快乐中国 in China). It is also more typical to omit 的 when a single-syllable adjective is used than for a multi-syllable adjective (e.g., compare 坏人 (壞人) with 奇怪的人). In general, there are no strict rules regarding when 的 can be omitted; however, some adjectives and adjective-noun pairs are more often seen without the associative particle than others.

Some examples:

- 坏(huài) 人(rén) （壞人）— "bad person"
- 奇怪(qíguài) 的(de) 人(rén) — "strange person"
- 可爱(kěài) 的(de) 熊猫(xióngmāo) （可愛的熊貓）— "cute panda"

== Predicative (after nouns) ==
=== First pattern ===
Unlike English, subjects and predicate adjectives in a Chinese sentence are not linked by copula but by degree adverbs, such as 很 hěn "very," 好 hǎo "highly", 真 zhēn "really," and 非常 fēicháng "extraordinarily, extremely." For example, the following sentences express increasing degrees of "beauty":

她 很 漂亮。
tā hěn piàoliang
She is beautiful.

她 好 漂亮。
tā hǎo piàoliang
She is very beautiful.

她 真 漂亮。
tā zhēn piàoliang
She is really beautiful.

她 非常 漂亮。
tā fēicháng piàoliang
She is extraordinarily beautiful.

A complementary adverb (e.g. 极了 jí le) can also specify the degree of an adjective:

她 漂亮 极 了。
tā piàoliang jí le
She is exceedingly beautiful.

NB: 很 often functions as a dummy linking adverb and does not carry the meaning of "very". For example, 她很漂亮 is often understood and translated as "She is beautiful".

Besides, in colloquial Chinese the pattern "AA死了" (sǐ le, literally "to death") or "AA死BB了" is sometimes used in exaggeration to highlight the extent of influence, where AA is an adjective and BB is the thing being affected. Examples include

- "热死了" (热 rè = hot) - meaning "It's so hot [to the extent that I cannot bear any more]"
- "饿死了" (饿 è = hungry) - meaning "[I feel] so hungry [to the extent that I cannot bear any more]"
- "热死我了" - meaning "I feel so hot [to the extent that I cannot bear any more]"

=== Second pattern ===
The linking verb 是 shì (to be) is used with adjectives in the pattern—Noun + 是 + Adj + 的—to state or emphasize a fact or a perceived fact. For example:

他 是 男 的。
tā shì nán de
3SG {to be} male {}
He is male.

那 辆 车 是 新 的。
nà liàng chē shì xīn de
that CL car {to be} new {}
That car is new.

那 只 猫 是 黑 的。
nà zhī māo shì hēi de
that CL cat {to be} black {}
That cat is black.

Since 的 is a possessive particle, and the following noun is understood here, more precise translations would be "He is a male one", "That car is a new one", and "That cat is a black one".

== Parts of speech ==
- Chinese pronouns
- Chinese verbs
- Chinese particles
- Chinese grammar
