= Pronouns in Chinese =

Words in Chinese that substitute for a noun or noun phrase

Chinese pronouns (Note: Chinese: 代词/代詞; pinyin: dàicí or Chinese: 代名詞; pinyin: dàimíngcí) are pronouns in the Chinese languages. This article highlights Mandarin Chinese pronouns. There are also Cantonese pronouns and Hokkien pronouns.

Chinese pronouns differ somewhat from English pronouns and those of other Indo-European languages. For instance, there is no differentiation in the spoken language between "he", "she" and "it" (though a written difference was introduced after contact with the West), and pronouns are not inflected to indicate whether they are the subject or object of a sentence. Mandarin Chinese further lacks a distinction between the possessive adjective ("my") and possessive pronoun ("mine"); both are formed by appending the particle 的 de. Pronouns in Chinese are often substituted by honorific alternatives.

== Personal pronouns ==
=== In Mandarin ===
Personal pronouns
Person	Singular		Plural	
1st	我 wǒ I, me		我们 / 我們* wǒmen we, us	咱们 / 咱們^{†} zánmen we, us (inclusive)
2nd	你 nǐ thou, you (informal)	您 nín you (formal)	你们 / 你們 nǐmen you (generic)	您 nín you (formal)
3rd	他, 她, 它 tā he, him / she, her / it		他们 / 他們, 她们 / 她們, 它们 / 它們 tāmen they, them	

* 我们 / 我們 can be either inclusive or exclusive, depending on the circumstance where it is used.
^{†} 咱们 / 咱們 is mainly used by northern speakers.

Following the iconoclastic May Fourth Movement in 1919, and to accommodate the translation of Western literature, written vernacular Chinese developed separate pronouns for gender-differentiated speech, and to address animals, deities, and inanimate objects.

This can be traced back to colonialism and Western-oriented linguistics in the early 1900s, where Eurocentric standardization of language and culture emerged to purify and create "effective governance." English was seen as progressive, while Chinese was characterized as a delayed language. Before written Chinese, spoken Chinese did not differentiate between genders in regard to pronouns. Written Chinese was only relevant to the public under imperial decrees, and literacy was a privilege that ordinary citizens rarely had access to, due to Confucianist ideals. There was an assumption that alphabetic literacy was superior in nature, and the assimilation of the Chinese language was initiated by Catholic missionaries from the West. During the transition from the Qing Dynasty to the Republic of China, the modern nation urgently moved to adopt European ideologies, which translated to culture and linguistics.

The focus on building a unified state was a driver in standardizing the Chinese language, which largely pushed Putonghua to be the dominant dialect. On the other hand, China's minority languages suffered a huge blow—with diversity and culture being eradicated in the name of assimilation. Language standardization, thus, became the norm as it was seen as a positive and rational step towards industrialization.

An early usage of the pronoun 她 (tā); Emancipation Pictorial, August 1921

Throughout the 1920s, a debate continued between three camps: those that preferred to preserve the preexisting use of 他 without distinction between genders, those that wished to preserve the spoken non-gendered pronoun but introduce a new female pronoun 她 in writing, and those that wished to introduce a differently pronounced female pronoun 伊. The pronoun 伊 enjoyed widespread support in the 1920s and 1930s but lost out to 她 after the Chinese Civil War. Currently, written pronouns are divided between the masculine human 他 (he, him), feminine human 她 (she, her), and non-human 它 (it), and similarly in the plural. This distinction does not exist in the spoken language, where moreover tā is restricted to animate reference; inanimate entities are usually referred to with demonstrative pronouns for 'this' (这/這 zhè) and 'that' (那 nà).

Other, rarer new written pronouns in the second person are nǐ (祢 "you, a deity") and nǐ (妳 "you, a female"). In the third person, they are tā (牠 "it, an animal"), tā (祂 "it, a deity"), and tā (它 "it, an inanimate object"). Among users of traditional Chinese characters, these distinctions are only made in Taiwanese Mandarin; in simplified Chinese, tā (它) is the only third-person non-human form and nǐ (你) is the only second person form. The third person distinction between "he" (他) and "she" (她) remains in use in all forms of written standard Mandarin.

Different written forms of the Mandarin third-person personal pronoun tā

In the early 21st century, some members of genderfluid and queer Chinese online communities started using X也 and TA to refer to a generic, anonymous, or non-binary third person. In September 2025, the character U+323BF 𲎿 CJK UNIFIED IDEOGRAPH-323BF, a combination of 㐅 (imitating the Latin "X") and 也, was added to the Unicode standard. Since at least 2014, Bilibili has used TA in its user pages. In September 2025 as well, the specifically male version, a combination of 男 (meaning "male") and 也 was also added to the standard, as U+32C3C 𲰼 CJK UNIFIED IDEOGRAPH-32C3C.

==== Additional notes ====
- The first-person pronouns 俺 ǎn and 偶 ǒu "I" are infrequently used in Mandarin conversation. They are of dialectal origin. However, their usage is gaining popularity among the young, most notably in online communications.
- According to Wang Li, the second person formal pronoun nín (您 "you, formal; polite") is derived from the fusion of the second person plural nǐmen (你们 "you, formal; polite"), making it somewhat analogous to the T–V distinction in Romance languages. Consistent with this hypothesized origin, *nínmen is traditionally considered to be a grammatically incorrect expression for the formal second person plural. Instead, the alternative phrases dàjiā (大家, "you, formal plural") and gèwèi (各位, "you, formal plural") are used, with the latter being somewhat more formal than the former. In addition, some dialects use an analogous formal third person pronoun tān (怹, "he/she, formal; polite").

=== In other Sinitic languages ===
There are many other pronouns in modern Sinitic languages, such as Taiwanese Hokkien 恁 (Pe̍h-ōe-jī: lín) "you" and Written Cantonese 佢哋 (keúih deih) "they." There exist many more pronouns in Classical Chinese and in literary works, including 汝 (rǔ) or 爾 (ěr) for "you", and 吾 (wú) for "I" (see Chinese honorifics). They are not routinely encountered in colloquial speech.

		Historical			Modern				
		Shang and early Zhou period	Classical Chinese	Northern and Southern dynasties period and Tang dynasty	Standard Chinese (Mandarin Chinese)	Shanghainese (Wu Chinese)	Hokkien (Min Chinese)	Meixian Hakka (Hakka Chinese)	Cantonese (Yue Chinese)
Singular	1.	余 *la, 予 *laʔ, 朕 *lrəmʔ	我 *ŋˤajʔ, 吾 *ŋˤa (subjective and possessive only), 余 *la, 予 *laʔ	我 ngaX, 吾 ngu	我 wǒ	吾 ŋu˩˧	我 góa, óa	𠊎 ŋai^{11}	我 ŋɔː˩˧
Singular	2.	汝/女 *naʔ, 乃 *nˤəʔ	爾 *neʔ, 汝/女 *naʔ, 而 *nə, 若 *nak	爾 nejX, 汝/女 nyoX, 你 nejX	你 nǐ	儂 noŋ˩˧	汝 lí, lír, lú	你 n^{11}, ŋ^{11}, ɲi^{11}	你 nei˩˧
Singular	3.	厥 *kot (possessive), 之 *tə (objective), 其 *gə (possessive), third person subject pronoun did not exist	之 *tə (objective), 其 *gə (possessive), third person subject pronoun did not exist	其 gi, 渠 gjo; 伊 'jij, 之 tsyi, 他 tha	他, 她, 它 tā	伊 ɦi˩˧	伊 i	佢 ɡi^{11}, i^{11}	佢 kʰɵy˩˧
Plural	1.	我 *ŋˤajʔ	same as singular	Singular + 等 tongX, 曹 dzaw, 輩 pwojH	Both INCL. and EXCL. 我們 wǒmen INCL. 咱們 zánmen	阿拉 ɐʔ˧ lɐʔ˦	EXCL. 阮 goán, gún, ún INCL. 咱 lán	EXCL. 𠊎兜/𠊎等 ŋai^{11} deu^{24}/ŋai^{11} nen^{24} INCL. 這兜/大家 en^{24} ia^{31} deu^{24}/en^{24} tai^{55} ga^{24}	我哋 ŋɔː˩˧ tei˨
Plural	2.	爾 *neʔ	same as singular	Singular + 等 tongX, 曹 dzaw, 輩 pwojH	你們 nǐmen	㑚 na˩˧	恁 lín	你兜/你等 ŋ^{11} deu^{24}/ŋ^{11} nen^{24}	你哋 nei˩˧ tei˨
Plural	3.	(not used)	same as singular	Singular + 等 tongX, 曹 dzaw, 輩 pwojH	他們, 她們, 它們 tāmen	伊拉 ɦi˩ lɐʔ˧	𪜶 in	佢兜/佢等 ɡi^{11} deu^{24}/i^{11} nen^{24}	佢哋 kʰɵy˩˧ tei˨

== Possessives ==
To indicate alienable possession, 的 (de) is appended to the pronoun. For inalienable possession, such as family and entities very close to the owner, this may be omitted, e.g. 我妈/我媽 (wǒ mā) "my mother". For older generations, 令 (lìng) is the equivalent to the modern form 您的 (nínde), as in 令尊 (lìngzūn) "your father". In literary style, 其 (qí) is sometimes used for "his" or "her" or as a gender-neutral pronoun; e.g. 其父 means "his father" or "her father".

In Cantonese, for possessive, 嘅 (ge3) is appended to the pronoun. It is used in the same way as 的 in Mandarin.

In Taiwanese Hokkien, possessive pronouns are homophonous with plural pronouns. For example, 恁 (Pe̍h-ōe-jī: lín) can mean either "your" or "you (plural)".

== Demonstrative pronouns ==
The demonstrative pronouns work the same as in English.

	Singular	Plural
Proximal	这个 / 這個 zhège this	这些 / 這些 zhèxiē these
Distal	那个 / 那個 nàge that	那些 nàxiē those

The distinction between singular and plural are made by the classifier 个/個 (gè) and 些 (xiē), and the following nouns remain the same. Usually inanimate objects are referred using these pronouns rather than the personal pronouns 它 (tā) and 它們 (tāmen). Traditional forms of these pronouns are: 這個 (zhège), 這些 (zhèxiē), 那個 (nàge), and 那些 (nàxiē).

== Interrogative pronouns ==
Pronoun	Alternative HÉ-system	English
谁 / 誰 shéi	何人 hérén (what person)	who
哪个 / 哪個 nǎge	何个 / 何個 hége (what one)	which one
什麼 / 什么 shénme	何 何物 hé / héwù (what)	what
哪裡 / 哪里 nǎlǐ 哪兒 / 哪儿 nǎr	何处 / 何處 héchù 何地 hédì (what location)	where
什麼時候 / 什么时候 shénme shíhou	何时 / 何時 héshí (what time)	when
为什么 / 為什麼 wèi shénme	爲何 / 為何 wèihé (for what)	why
怎么 / 怎麼 zěnme	如何 rúhé (what to follow)	how
多少 duōshǎo 几 / 幾 jǐ	几何 / 幾何 jǐhé (what the amount)	how much

== Indefinite pronouns ==
Pronoun	English
大家 dàjiā	everyone
谁都 shéidōu	everyone
谁也 shéiyě	anybody
谁都不 shéidōubù	no one
谁也不 shéiyěbù	nobody

== Pronouns in imperial times ==
See also Chinese honorifics.

In imperial times, the pronoun for "I" was commonly omitted when speaking politely or to someone with higher social status. "I" was usually replaced with special pronouns to address specific situations. Examples include guǎrén (寡人) during early Chinese history and zhèn (朕) after the Qin dynasty when the Emperor is speaking to his subjects. When the subjects speak to the Emperor, they address themselves as chén (臣), or "your official". It was extremely impolite and taboo to address the Emperor as "you" or to refer to oneself as "I".

In modern times, the practice of self-deprecatory terms is still used in specific formal situations. In résumés, the term guì (贵/貴; lit. noble) is used for "you" and "your"; e.g., guì gōngsī (贵公司/貴公司) refers to "your company". Běnrén (本人; lit. this person) is used to refer to oneself.

== See also ==
- Chinese honorifics
- Chinese grammar
- Chinese language
- Cantonese pronouns
- Hokkien pronouns

== Bibliography ==
- Kane, Daniel (2006). The Chinese Language: Its History and Usage. North Clarendon, VT: Tuttle. ISBN 0-8048-3853-4. OCLC 77522617.
- Sun, Chaofen (2006). Chinese: A Linguistic Introduction. Cambridge: Cambridge University Press. pp. 166–169. ISBN 0-521-82380-3. OCLC 70671780.
- Yip, Po-Ching; Rimmington, Don (2004). Chinese: A Comprehensive Grammar. London; New York: Routledge. pp. 47–58. ISBN 978-0-415-15031-6. OCLC 52178249.
