= Ejen =

Manchu title

Ejen (Manchu: ᡝᠵᡝᠨ; Chinese: 額真 or 主) is a Manchu word literally meaning "lord" or "master". It was used during the Qing dynasty of China to refer to leaders or officials of the Eight Banners or the Emperors of the Qing dynasty as the supreme leaders of the Eight Banners system.

== History ==
The term can be traced back to the Later Jin dynasty before 1636. At this time, ejen was a borrowed word from Mongolian, meaning "lord" or "master". During the Later Jin dynasty the objects referred to by the term ejen in Manchu were originally diverse. For example, after the establishment of the Eight Banners system in the early 17th century, the term was used in the official names of the Eight Banners, such as Gūsa ejen, Meiren-i ejen, Jalan ejen, and Niru ejen. At this time Jurchens (later became known as the Manchus) commonly used Khan to refer to the sovereign, and ejen was rarely used in this sense. Even when it was used with this meaning, it appeared in general expressions such as gurun i/de ejen ("lord of/in the country"), and it was also used to the refer to the Mongol khans and the Emperor of the Ming dynasty. But by 1634, the term ejen in the official names of the Eight Banners mentioned above, except for the highest-level Gūsa ejen, was changed to janggin (meaning "general"), such as Meiren-i janggin, Jalan janggin, and Niru janggin. After the Ming-Qing transition, ejen began to become a title for the emperor of the Qing dynasty who was the supreme leader of the Eight Banners system, along with titles like the Son of Heaven and Huangdi. The word was often used by Bannermen officials to refer to the emperor of the Qing dynasty during the reign of the Qianlong Emperor, and by this time it was rarely used as a common noun to refer to the "master" of various groups. Since the relationship between Bannermen officials and the Emperors was comparable to that between "master and servant" in a household, Bannermen officials often used the term Booi Aha or Nucai (meaning "servant") for self-address at court when addressing the Emperor.

== Ranks ==
- Gūsa-i ejen ᡤᡡᠰᠠ ᡳ
  ᡝᠵᡝᠨ (固山额真; 固山額真; gùshān é'zhēn), meaning "master of a banner", later Sinicised to become dutong (都統; dūtǒng), meaning "colonel";
  - Evolved into zongbing (总兵; 總兵; zǒngbīng), meaning "chief commander";
  - Then into amba janggin ᠠᠮᠪᠠ
    ᠵᠠᠩᡤᡳᠨ (昂邦章京/按班章京; ángbāng zhāngjīng/ànbān zhāngjīng; Их занги), meaning "grand general";
  - Then into jinkini hafan ᠵᡳᠩᡴᡳᠨᡳ
    ᡥᠠᡶᠠᠨ (精奇尼哈番; jīngqíní hāfān), meaning "prime officer";
  - Which was finally Sinicised to become zi (子; zǐ), meaning "viscount".
- Meiren-i ejen ᠮᡝᡳᡵᡝᠨ ᡳ
  ᡝᠵᡝᠨ (梅勒额真/美淩額真; 梅勒額真/美凌額真; méilè é'zhēn/měilíng é'zhēn), meaning "vice master", Sinicised to become fu dutong (副都统; fù dūtǒng), meaning "vice colonel";
  - Evolved into fujiang (副将; 副將; fùjiàng), meaning "vice general";
  - Then into meiren-i janggin ᠮᡝᡳᡵᡝᠨ ᡳ
    ᠵᠠᠩᡤᡳᠨ (梅勒章京; méilè zhāngjīng; Мэйрэний занги), meaning "vice general";
  - Then into ashan-i hafan ᠠᠰᡥᠠᠨ ᡳ
    ᡥᠠᡶᠠᠨ (阿思尼哈番; ā'sīní hāfān), meaning "vice officer";
  - Which was finally Sinicised to become nan (男; nán), meaning "baron".
- Jalan-i ejen ᠵᠠᠯᠠᠨ ᡳ
  ᡝᠵᡝᠨ (甲喇额真; 甲喇額真; jiǎlā é'zhēn), meaning "master of a sub-banner", Sinicised to become canling (参领; 參領; cānlǐng), meaning "staff captain";
  - Evolved into canjiang (参将; 參將; cānjiàng), meaning "staff general", or youji (游击; 游擊; yóujī), meaning "vanguard" or "skirmish leader";
  - Then into jalan-i janggin ᠵᠠᠯᠠᠨ ᡳ
    ᠵᠠᠩᡤᡳᠨ (扎兰章京; 扎蘭章京; zhālán zhāngjīng; Залангийн занги), meaning "general of a sub-banner";
  - Then into adaha hafan ᠠᡩᠠᡥᠠ
    ᡥᠠᡶᠠᠨ (阿达哈哈番; 阿達哈哈番; ā'dáhā hāfān), meaning "chariot officer";
  - Which was finally Sinicised to become qingche duwei (轻车都尉; 輕車都尉; qīngchē dūweì), meaning "master commandant of light chariot".
- Niru-i ejen ᠨᡳᡵᡠᡳ
  ᡝᠵᡝᠨ (牛录额真; 牛錄額真; niúlù é'zhēn), meaning "master of an arrow" (an "arrow" was a basic unit of a banner army), later Sinicised to become zuoling (佐领; 佐領; zuólǐng), meaning "assistant captain";
  - Evolved into beiyu (备御; 備御; bèiyù), meaning "rearguard";
  - Then into niru-i janggin ᠨᡳᡵᡠᡳ
    ᠵᠠᠩᡤᡳᠨ (牛录章京; 牛錄章京; niúlù zhāngjīng; Сумын занги), meaning "general of an arrow";
  - Then into baitalabura hafan ᠪᠠᡳᡨᠠᠯᠠᠪᡠᡵᡝ
    ᡥᠠᡶᠠᠨ (拜他喇布勒哈番; bàitālābùlè hāfān), meaning "adjutant officer";
  - Which was finally Sinicised to become ji duwei (骑都尉; 騎都尉; jì dūweì), meaning "master commandant of cavalry".

== See also ==
- List of emperors of the Qing dynasty
- Chinese honorifics
- Khan (title)
- Booi Aha
- Nucai
