= Hokkien profanity =

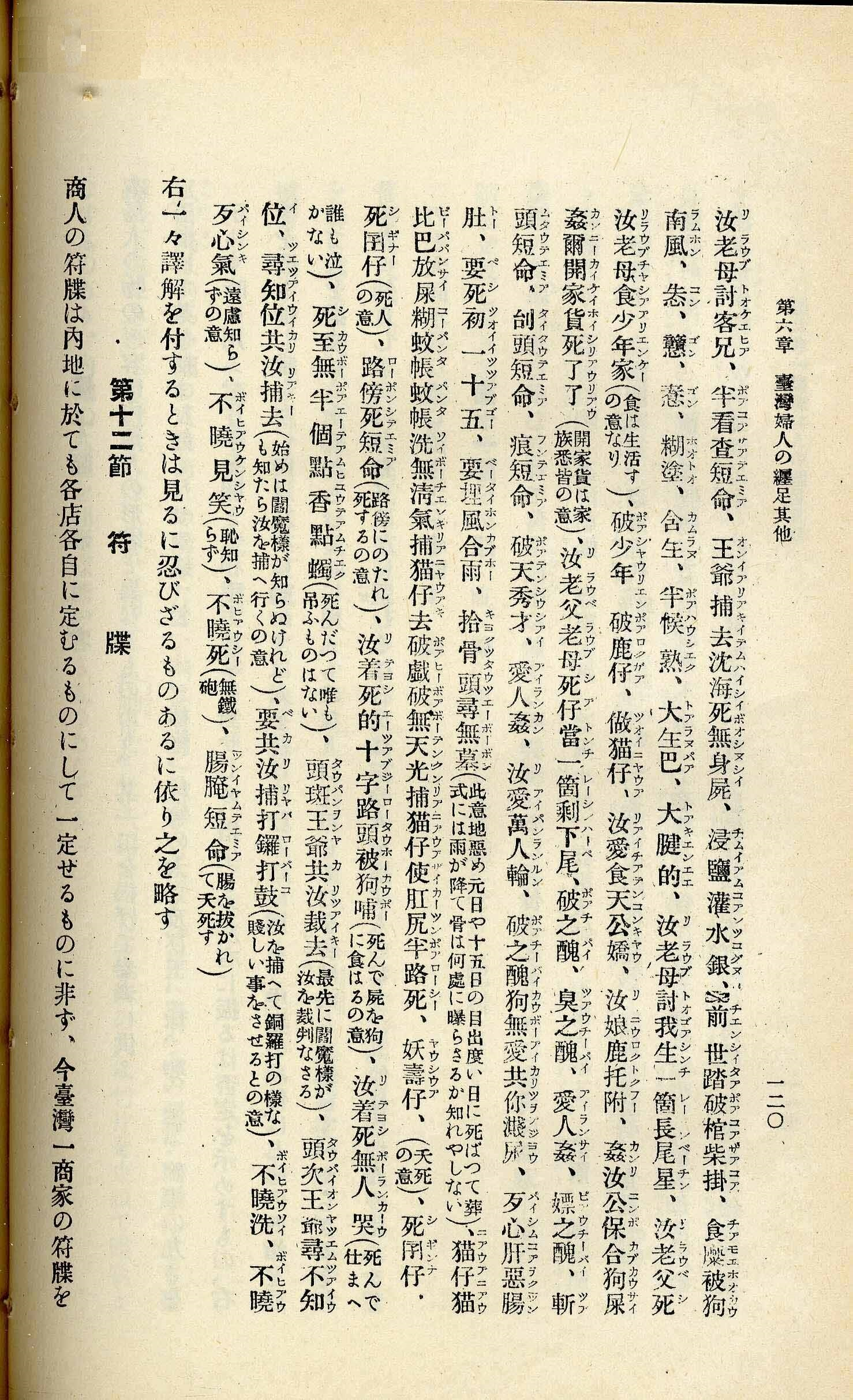
- Profanities of Taiwanese Hokkien in Japanese ruled era
- Hàn-jī: 垃圾話
- Pe̍h-ōe-jī: Lap-sap-ōe / Lah-sap-ōe
- Tâi-lô: lap-sap-uē / lah-sap-uē

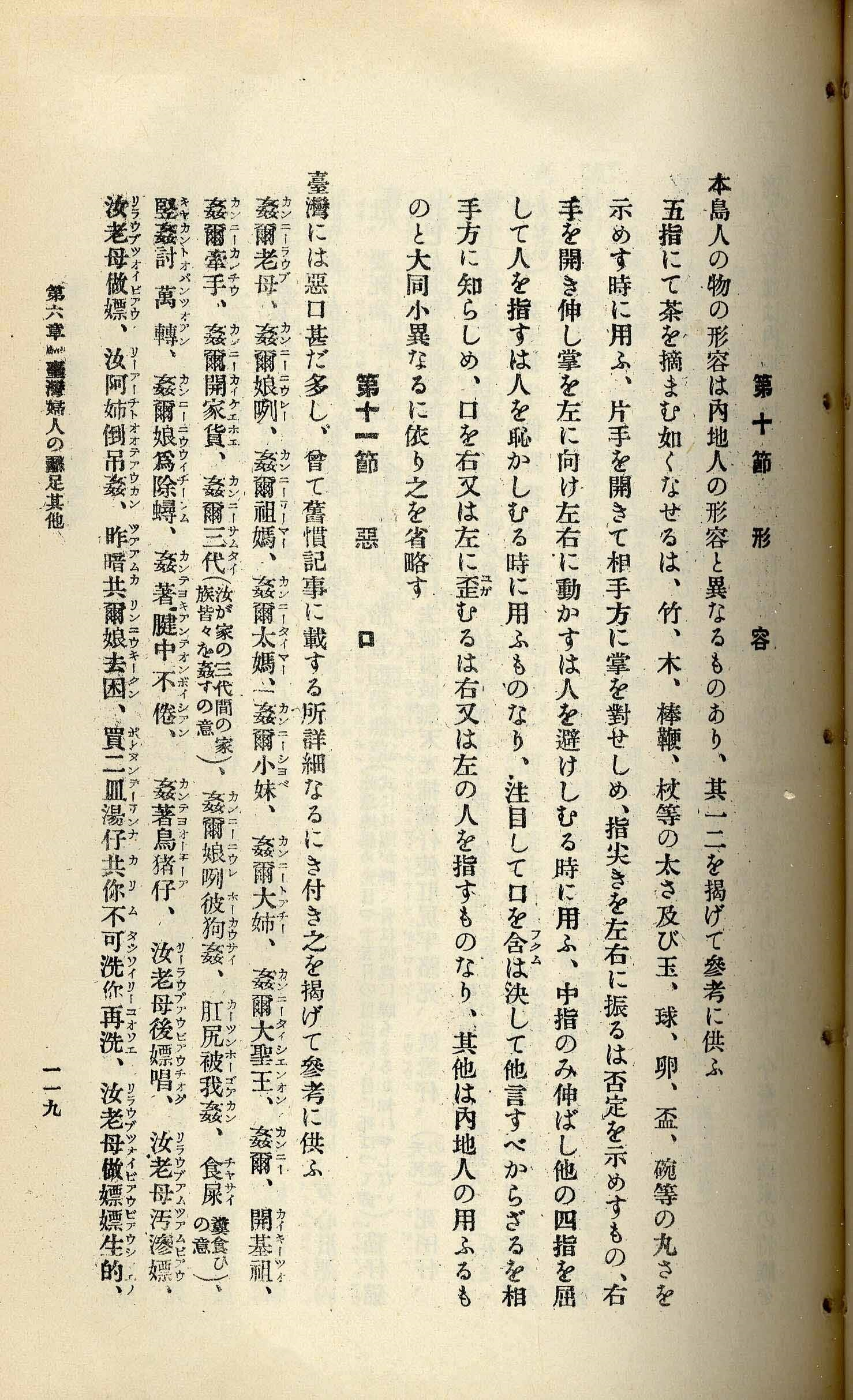
Profanities of Taiwanese Hokkien Japanese ruled era

Hokkien is one of the largest Chinese language varieties worldwide. Profanity in Hokkien most commonly involves sexual references and scorn of the object's ancestors, especially their mother. The mentioning of sexual organs is frequently used in Hokkien profanity.

Hokkien is the preferred language for swearing in Singapore.

As in English, a vulgar word for the sexual act fuck is used in insults and expletives. Below are the most commonly used Hokkien vulgar words.

== Vulgarities involving sexual acts ==
=== Kan ===
Kan (Chinese: 姦; Pe̍h-ōe-jī: kàn), literally meaning fuck, is the most common but grossly vulgar profanity in Hokkien. It's sometimes also written as 幹. It is a common swear word in Taiwan, Malaysia, and Singapore. Used in a manner similar to the English word fuck, kan can express dismay, disgrace, and disapproval. It is extremely offensive when used to insult someone.

kàn lín lāu-bú chhàu chi-bai (Chinese: 姦恁老母臭膣屄), often abbreviated to kàn lín lāu-bú (Chinese: 姦恁老母) or simply "kàn lín niâ" (Chinese: 姦恁娘), is the most notoriously popular Hokkien expletive meaning "fuck your mother's smelly vagina (Cunt can also be substituted in this.)".

Variety of phrases associated with Kan:

- kàn lín-niâ (Chinese: 姦恁娘) = fuck your mother
- kàn lín lāu-bú (Chinese: 姦恁老母) = fuck your mother
- kàn lín lāu-bú chhàu chi-bai (Chinese: 姦恁老母臭膣屄) = fuck your mother's smelly vagina
- kàn lín chó͘-má (Chinese: 姦恁祖媽) = fuck your great grandmother
- kàn lín lāu-su (Chinese: 姦恁老師) = fuck your teacher
- kàn lín-niâ chi-bai (Chinese: 姦恁娘膣屄) = fuck your mother's vagina
- kàn lín-niâ chhàu chi-bai (Chinese: 姦恁娘臭膣屄) = fuck your mother's smelly vagina
- kàn lín lāu-bú poah chi-bai (Chinese: 姦恁老母撥膣屄) = fuck your mother's broken vagina, literally means "fuck your mother broken vagina"
- kàn lín-niâ-bú chhàu chi-bai (Chinese: 姦恁娘母臭膣屄) = fuck your mother's smelly vagina. In Singapore, niâ-bú 娘母 (mother) also exists in other variants of pronunciation such as nâ-bú (a vowel change from niâ to nâ when spoken quickly), nâ-beh (Chinese: 娘尾).
- kàn lí chin-sóng(Chinese: 姦你真爽) = literally means "it's cool to rape/fuck you"
- kàn kah ē khan-si (Chinese: 姦甲會牽絲) = literally means "fucking you until it becomes wet". Describing that vagina will become wet and intertwined like a spider web during sexual intercourse
- lín-niâ (Chinese: 恁娘), lín-niâ—leh (Chinese: 恁娘咧) or lín-niâ khah-hó (Chinese: 恁娘較好) = short form for kàn lín-niâ (Chinese: 姦恁娘), meaning "fuck your mother".
- sio-kàn (Chinese: 相姦 ) = means having sex, fucking each other, to fuck
- tio̍h kàn (Chinese: 著姦 ) = to get fucked
- hiông-kàn (Chinese: 雄姦 ) = expression used in anger, meaning "go get fucked!"
- khí-kàn (Chinese: 起姦) = start scolding someone in vulgarity, start swearing
- kàn kha-tshng (Chinese: 姦尻川) = sodomy, anal or oral sex
- káu-kàn-tūi(Chinese: 狗姦懟 ) = to curse someone being fucked/raped by a dog
- hō͘-káu-kàn-kàn leh (Chinese: 予狗姦姦咧) = to curse someone to be fucked by a dog

=== Others ===
- poah (撥) - to fuck or fucking
- bôa (磨)- literally 'to rub' or 'to grind'. Slang for 'having sex', the imagery being two bodies rubbing against each other.
- tēⁿ (捏)- literally 'to squeeze' or 'to lie on something'. Slang for 'fuck'.
  - "lí hō͘ lâng tēⁿ" (汝予人捏) - you let yourself get (squeezed).
- sè (勢) - literally 'to whack'. Slang for 'fuck'.
  - "lí hō͘ lâng sè" (汝予人勢) (you let yourself get fucked).
- kā (咬) - literally 'to bite'; slang for fellatio. Expression:
  - "lí khàm goá lān-chiáu" (汝崁我𡳞鳥) (suck my cock), used in anger as in "up yours!"
- khàm (崁)- literally 'to cover'; slang for fellatio. Expression:
  - "khàm lān" (崁𡳞) (stupid cock).
- phah chhíu-chhèng (拍手銃)- literally 'to fire a hand-gun'; slang for male masturbation
- chhīu-ni/chhiū-leng (樹奶) - literally 'rubber'; slang for condom

== Vulgarities involving sexual organs ==
=== Female organs ===
- chi-bai (膣屄) - vagina; cunt
- chhàu chi-bai (臭膣屄)- smelly vagina
- ni, leng (奶)- breast

=== Male organs ===
- lān-chiáu (𡳞鳥) - penis; also used as an expression to indicate incredulity, as in the English "Bullshit!". Expressions:
  - koài-lān (怪𡳞) - literally 'weird penis', used to call somebody fucked up or abnormal.
  - kóng lān-chiáu oe (講𡳞鳥話) - to talk rubbish
  - khoàⁿ siáⁿ-mih lān-chiáu? (看啥物𡳞鳥) - "What the hell are you looking at?"
- lān-pha (𡳞脬)- scrotum; also used as an expression to indicate incredulity, as in the English "Bollocks!" Nasal assimilation takes place as the onset of the second syllable is a bilabial, turning the underlying form /n/ in the coda of the first syllable to the surface form /m/.
- lān-hu̍t (𡳞核) - testes; used in a similar way as the above examples.

=== Gender-neutral organs ===
- kha-chhng (尻川) - buttocks or anus
- kha-chhng khang (尻川孔) - anus; arsehole

== Vulgarities without sexual references ==
- khàu-pē khàu-bú (哭爸哭母) - literally 'cry father cry mother', refers to annoying and noisy complaining. This expression is considered vulgar possibly due to the practice of professional mourners wailing for the dead; one using this phrase would be inauspicious due to the allusion to this practice.

== Hokkien profanities grouped by word ==
Hokkien profanities
– Chi-bai –
Pe̍h-ōe-jī	Hàn-jī	literal meaning	English translation	Notes
chi-bai	膣屄	cunt		
chhàu chi-bai	臭膣屄	smelly cunt		
– Kàn –
Pe̍h-ōe-jī	Hàn-jī	literal meaning	English translation	Notes
kàn	姦	to fuck		
kàn lín chó͘-má	姦恁祖媽	to fuck your grandmother		
kàn lín lāu-bú	姦恁老母	to fuck your mother		
kàn lín lāu-bú chhàu chi-bai	姦恁老母臭膣屄	to fuck your mother's smelly cunt		
kàn lín lāu-su	姦恁老師	to fuck your teacher		Often used in Taiwan.
kàn lín niâ	姦恁娘	to fuck your mother		Pronounced as kan ni na in Singapore and Malaysia
kàn lín niâ chhàu chi-bai	姦恁娘臭膣屄	to fuck your mother's smelly cunt		
tio̍h-kàn	著姦	to be fucked		The prefix 著 (tioh8) implies passive.
– Khàu –
Pe̍h-ōe-jī	Hàn-jī	literal meaning	English translation	Notes
khàu	哭	to cry		
khàu iau	哭枵	to cry for hunger		哭 (khau^{3}) means to cry, and 枵 (iau^{1}) means hunger.
khàu pē	哭爸	to cry for father		哭 (khau^{3}) means to cry, and 爸 (pe^{7}) means father.
– Lān –
Pe̍h-ōe-jī	Hàn-jī	literal meaning	English translation	Notes
lān	𡳞	male reproductive system		
lān-chiáu	𡳞鳥	penis	bullshit	
lān-hu̍t(-á)	𡳞核(-仔)	testes	bullshit	
lān-pha	𡳞脬	scrotum	bollocks	
lān-sîn	𡳞神	the god of penis	lazy man	
ōe hó͘ lān	畫虎𡳞	to draw the tiger's penis	boast	
– Siâu –
Pe̍h-ōe-jī	Hàn-jī	literal meaning	English translation	Notes
siâu	潲	semen		
chia̍h siâu	食潲	to eat semen	no way	
gê-siâu	㤉潲		to loathe, dislike	
gia̍t-siâu	孽潲		be naughty	
hau-siâu	嘐潲		boast	For example, Mái thiaⁿ i teh hau-siâu! (Don't believe what he says!).
siáⁿ-siâu	啥潲		what the hell	For example, Lí sī teh kóng siáⁿ-siâu haⁿh?! (What the hell are you talking about?!).
soe-siâu	衰潲		be unlucky	For example, Kin-á-ji̍t chin soe-siâu! (It's an unlucky day!).
chhap-siâu	插潲		to care about	For example, Mái kā i chhap-siâu lah! (Don't care about it!).
– Others –
Pe̍h-ōe-jī	Hàn-jī	literal meaning	English translation	Notes
kha-chhng	尻川	ass	buttocks or anus	
lín chó͘-má	恁祖媽	your grandmother	first personal pronoun	Used by female speakers as a rude modality, see Hokkien pronouns.
lín niâ	恁娘	your mother		
lín pē	恁爸	your father	first personal pronoun	Used by male speakers as a rude modality, see Hokkien pronouns.
tio̍h-kâu	著猴	be monkey-like	to become crazy	
cha̍p-chéng	雜種/十種	mixed breed / ten breed	mongrel; fucker	
piáu-siⁿ	婊生	prostitute/bitch-born	son of a bitch; bastard	
soaⁿ-kâu	山猴	mountain monkey	stupid; clueless; fool	
chhàu-hǐ	臭耳	smelly ear	deaf; rude; brusque	
chhàu-hoan	臭番	smelly foreigner / barbarian	roughshod; lowly	
siáu-siáu	痟痟	insane; mad	crazy; dumb	
iáu-siū	夭壽	die young	Damn!	
