= Pronouns in Cantonese =

Words in Cantonese that substitute for a noun or noun phrase

Pronouns in Cantonese are less numerous than their Indo-European languages counterparts. Cantonese uses pronouns that apply the same meaning to function as both subjective (English: I, he, we) and objective (me, him, us) just like many other Sinitic languages.

== Personal pronouns ==
Cantonese personal pronouns
Person	Singular		Plural*	
First person	我 - ngo5	'I/me'	我哋 - ngo5 dei6	'we/us'
Second person	你 - nei5	'you'	你哋 - nei5 dei6	'you (all)'
Third person	佢 - keoi5	'he/she/it'	佢哋 - keoi5 dei6	'they/them'

* Personal pronouns are the only items in Cantonese with distinct plural forms. The character to indicate plurality is formed by adding the suffix 哋 (dei6).

There exist many more pronouns in Classical Chinese and in literary works, including 汝 (jyu5) or 爾 (ji5) for "you", and 吾 (ng4) for "I" (see Chinese honorifics). However, they are not used in colloquial speech.

Third person singular (keoi5) Although (keoi5) is primarily used to refer to animate nouns (people or animals)in higher registers, it can also refer to inanimate objects and abstract entities in some restricted contexts. When (keoi5) is being referred to an inanimate item it is primarily found in the object position, rather than the subject position. In colloquial speech, its use is frequently extended to refer to nothing at all.

我 想 睇 晒 佢 先 還
ngo5 soeng2 tai2 saai3 keoi5 sin1 waan4
I want read all it first return
'I want to finish reading it before I return it.'

Plural suffix (-dei6) One of the few grammatical suffixes in the language, the suffix (-dei6) cannot be used to form plural forms of nouns.

   Example: (sin1saang1-dei6) can't be used to mean teachers

Other than the personal pronouns as shown above, its two other uses are:

1. In the form (jan4-dei6) which is used for indefinite pronouns (people, one, etc.)

人哋 睇住 你
jan4-dei6 tai2-zyu6 nei5
People are watching you

In this usage, the word (jan4) 'person' can also take (dei6) to mean 'people'. Despite the suffix (-dei6), (jan4-dei6) may have a singular or plural reference depending on the content.

This form can also be used to refer indirectly to oneself:

   Example: A: 你點解唔出聲㗎？ Nei5 dim2 gaai2 m4 ceot1 seng1 gaa3?   Why don't you say anything?
            B: 人哋唔好意思吖嘛 Jan4 dei6 m4 hou2 ji3 si1 aa1 maa3     It's because I'm embarrassed.

2. In contracted forms with names

   Example: Paul keoi5 dei6 → Paul-dei6         Paul and his family/friends
            A-Chan keoi5 dei6→ A-Chan-dei6      Chan and his family/company, etc.

== Possessive pronoun ==
To indicate possession 嘅 (ge3) is appended to the pronoun.

For serious use, 令 (ling6) to replace 你, as in 令尊 (ling6 zyun1) "Your father" as 你老竇 (nei5 lou5 dau4). In literary style, 其 (kei4) is sometimes used for "his" or "her"; e.g., 其父 (kei4 fu6) means "his father" or "her father".

== Omitted pronoun ==
In literature, daily phrases (especially ones about family or concepts very close to the owner, or when the subject or object of the sentence is already known, then it may be omitted, e.g. 我老母 (ngo5 lou5 mou5*2) or replace possession indicator with classifier, e.g. 我架車 (ngo5 gaa3 ce1).

Subject and object pronouns may be omitted in Cantonese under either of these two conditions:

1. The omitted subject or object has been the topic of a previous sentence, question or dialogue.
2. The reference is clear from the context. This applies especially to the first and second person subjects, and to third person entities which are present at the time of speaking.

== Reflexive pronoun ==
The singular personal pronouns (for humans) may be made reflexive by appending 自己 (zi6 gei2), "self". The reflexive form (zi6 gei2) is used for all persons: myself, yourself, herself, ourselves, etc. It may be distinguished into two different functions:

1. The true reflexive pronoun
2. An emphatic function, where it reinforces a pronoun or noun phrase.

我 自己 唔 會 咁 做
Ngo5 zi6-gei2 m4 wui5 gam2 zou6
I myself not would so behave
I myself would not behave like that

As a reflexive, (zi6 gei2) is subject-oriented. Another common function is to indicate 'by oneself' or 'alone'.

我 自己 買 餸 煮 飯
Ngo5 zi6-gei2 maai5 sung3 zyu2 faan6
I myself buy groceries cook rice
I’ll buy the groceries and cook by myself

== Pronouns in imperial times and self-deprecatory ==
In imperial times, the pronoun for "I" was commonly omitted when speaking politely or to someone with higher social status. "I" was usually replaced with special pronouns to address specific situations. Examples include 寡人 gwaa2 jan4 during early Chinese history and 朕 zam6 after the Qin dynasty when the Emperor is speaking to his subjects. When the subjects speak to the Emperor, they address themselves as 臣 (shen), or "your official". It is extremely impolite and taboo to address the Emperor as "you" or to address oneself as "I".

In modern times, the practice of self-deprecatory terms is still used. In formal letters, the term 貴 (gwai3; lit. important) is used for "you" and "your"; e.g., 貴公司 refers to "your company". 本人 (bun2 jan4; lit. this person) is used to refer to oneself.

== Demonstrative pronouns ==
Cantonese demonstrative pronouns
	Singular	Plural
Proximal	呢個 - ni1 go3	呢啲 - ni1 di1
Distal	嗰個 - go3*2 go3	嗰啲 - go3*2 di1

Single proximal demonstrative refers to as "this," single distal as "that," plural proximal as "these," and plural distal as "those."

呢 (ni1) and 嗰 (go3*2) indicates if the demonstratives are proximal or distal, respectively; whereas 個 (go3) and 啲 (di1) indicates if the demonstratives are single or plural, respectively.

== Interrogative pronouns ==
Cantonese interrogative pronouns
What	Which	Who	Where	When	How	Why
乜嘢 - mat1 je5; 咩呀 - me1 aa3	邊個 - bin1 go3	邊個 - bin1 go3; 邊位 - bin1 wai6*2; 乜誰 - mat1 seoi4*2; 乜人 - mat1 jan4*2	邊度 - bin1 dou3; 邊處- bin1 syu3	幾時 - gei2 si4*2; 幾點- gei2 dim2	點樣 - dim2 joeng6*2	點解 - dim2 gaai2; 為乜 - wai6 mat1

== See also ==
- Cantonese grammar
- Chinese pronouns
