= Nucai =

Chinese term for an obsequious person/minion/lackey

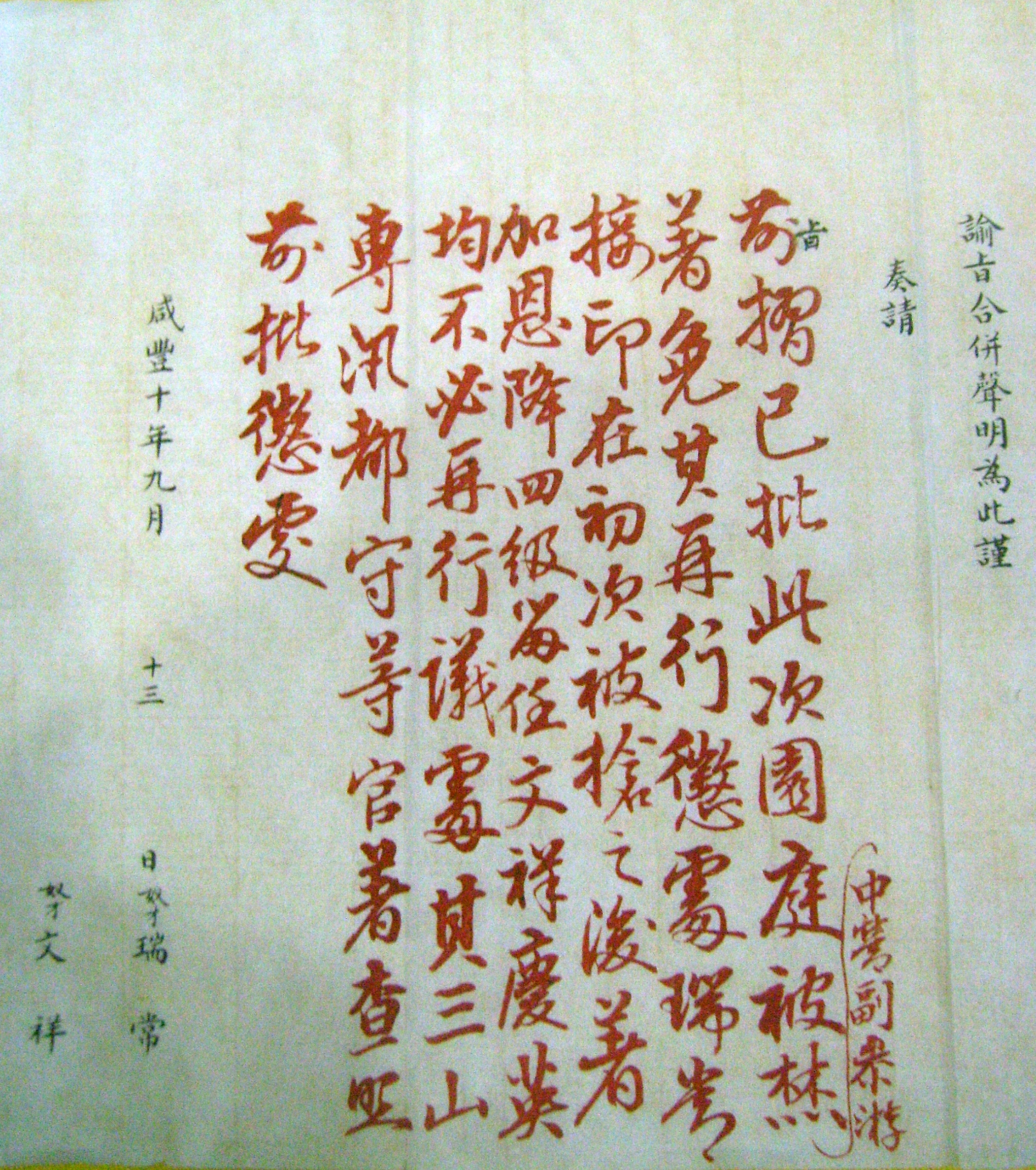
Petition from the Manchu officials Wenxiang and Ruichang to the Xianfeng Emperor in the 19th century, was signed "Nucai" on the bottom left-hand corner as a form of deprecatory self-address

Nucai (Chinese: 奴才; pinyin: Núcái; Manchu: ᠠᡥᠠ, Mölendroff: aha) is a Chinese term that can be translated as, 'lackey', 'yes-man', 'servant', 'slave', or a 'person of unquestioning obedience'. It originated in the tribes of northeastern China as a negative and derogatory term, often reserved for insult for someone perceived to be useless or incompetent. However, it was used most prominently in the Qing dynasty as a deprecatory first-person pronoun by Manchu or Bannermen officials at court when addressing the Emperor. Ordinary Han Chinese officials were forbidden from using the term for self-address; they used "chen" (Chinese: 臣) instead. The Qianlong Emperor once directed all his officials to call themselves "chen", but for some reason the directive never took effect.

== Usage ==
During the Qing dynasty, addressing oneself as nucai became a sort of 'privilege' reserved for Bannermen officials. Ordinary Han Chinese officials were forbidden to address themselves as nucai, and must address themselves as chen (臣, literally "your subject"). The rule was applied both in written and spoken situations. Such a rule surrounding the term nucai reflected the relationship between Manchu or Bannermen officials and the Emperor as that between "master and servant" in a household, while that between ordinary Han Chinese officials and the Emperor as simply between ruler and subject. The equivalent Manchu term for nucai is booi aha. The exclusivity of the term nucai meant that ordinary Han Chinese officials were given lower status at court, even though chen was historically considered a more prestigious form of self-address.

In 1773, the Qianlong Emperor received a joint memorial about imperial examinations from Manchu official Tianbao and Han Chinese official Ma Renlong. Both officials jointly signed the memorial as nucai, angering the Qianlong Emperor, who accused Ma Renlong of 'pretending to be a nucai' when he was not, and later decreed that if a Han Chinese and Manchu official were jointly petitioning the Emperor, they must uniformly use chen instead of nucai.

Chinese scholar Li Xinyu wrote that although the words of "master and servant" (i.e. nucai) has been institutionally abolished with the Chinese monarchy in 1911, people's "nucai mentality" (pejorative phrase for an attitude of servitude to the state or other authority figures) still exists in contemporary China.

Social critics point out that there is a degree of support for the so-called "nucai mentality" within elite circles, particularly by those who adhere by "Asian values". At the 2009 Boao Forum for Asia, actor Jackie Chan criticized the 2008 Chinese milk scandal, Taiwanese and Hong Kong society as "chaotic" because they are "too free", saying "I'm gradually beginning to feel that we Chinese need to be managed. If we're not being managed, we'll just do what we want." In the ensuing controversy, the Democratic Progressive Party of Taiwan attacked Chan for having "too strong of a nucai mentality" (奴才意識) and demanded that the Taipei Municipal Government remove Chan as the spokesman of the Taipei Deaflympics.

"Nucai mentality" has often been used as a slur to indiscriminately attack Chinese culture as a whole, leading critics to consider it as a form of internalized racism.

== See also ==
- Booi Aha
- Ejen
- Chinese honorifics
- Slavery in China
