= Booi Aha =

Hereditarily servile people in 17th-century Qing China

"Booi aha" in Manchu script

Booi Aha (Manchu: ᠪᠣᠣᡳ ᠨᡳᠶᠠᠯᠮᠠ (booi niyalma) for male, ᠪᠣᠣᡳ ᡥᡝᡥᡝ (booi hehe) for female; Chinese transliteration: 包衣阿哈) is a Manchu word literally meaning "household person", referring to hereditarily servile people in the Eight Banner system in 17th-century Qing China. It is often directly translated as "bondservant", although sometimes also simply rendered as the common word, slave, or more specifically within Chinese social and political context as nucai.

They were largely divided into three categories translated into English:

- company servants (Chinese: 佐領下人; Chinese: zuǒlǐng xiàrén)
- half-company servants (Chinese: 管領下人; Chinese: guǎnlǐng xiàrén)
- estate bannermen (Chinese: 莊頭旗人; Chinese: zhuāngtóu qírén) (Note: It can be shortened to zhuāngtóu rén without the qí.)

== Concept ==
According to Mark C. Elliott, the word "booi" could be confusing due to the absence of a proper Chinese word having the same meaning. The Manchu phrase literally means "of the household", but calling booi aha "slaves" conveys the wrong meaning. The reason is that there is no corresponding social status in Chinese society for booi, who often served in powerful positions and were sometimes intimates of the emperor.

As a compromise in Chinese they were called "bao-yi", but this caused further misunderstanding. In Manchu documents, booi only sometimes means "bond servant", and despite the common belief it can simply refer to "people to my house" in some occasions.

Pamela Kyle Crossley wrote in her book Orphan Warriors: "The Mongol is the slave of his sovereign. He is never free. His sovereign is his benefactor; [the Mongol] does not serve him for money." This Mongolian "traditional model of slave to owner" was taken up by the Manchu during the development of the Eight Banner military system.

Crossley gave as the definition of Manchu: "A Manchu was, moreover, a man who used his skills exclusively to serve the sovereign....banners as institutions were derived from Turkic and Mongolian forms of military servitude, all enrolled under the banners considered themselves slaves of the emperor and called themselves so (aha, Chinese: 奴才; pinyin: nucai) when addressing him...".

== Usage ==
Booi was sometimes regarded as synonymous with booi aha, but booi usually referred to household servants who performed domestic service, whereas aha usually referred to the servile people who worked in fields.

== Status ==
Manchu families adopted Han Chinese sons from families of bondservant Booi Aha origin and they served in Manchu company registers as detached household Manchus and the Qing imperial court found this out in 1729. Manchu Bannermen who needed money helped falsify registration for Han Chinese servants being adopted into the Manchu banners and Manchu families who lacked sons were allowed to adopt their servant's sons or servants themselves.

The Manchu families were paid to adopt Han Chinese sons from bondservant families by those families. The Qing Imperial Guard captain Batu was furious at the Manchus who adopted Han Chinese as their sons from slave and bondservant families in exchange for money and expressed his displeasure at them adopting Han Chinese instead of other Manchus.

These Han Chinese who infiltrated the Manchu Banners by adoption were known as "secondary-status bannermen" and "false Manchus" or "separate-register Manchus", and there were eventually so many of these Han Chinese that they took over military positions in the Banners which should have been reserved for Manchus. Han Chinese foster-son and separate register bannermen made up 800 out of 1,600 soldiers of the Mongol Banners and Manchu Banners of Hangzhou in 1740 which was nearly 50%. Han Chinese foster-son made up 220 out of 1,600 unsalaried troops at Jingzhou in 1747 and an assortment of Han Chinese separate-register, Mongol, and Manchu bannermen were the remainder. Han Chinese secondary status bannermen made up 180 of 3,600 troop households in Ningxia while Han Chinese separate registers made up 380 out of 2,700 Manchu soldiers in Liangzhou.

The result of these Han Chinese fake Manchus taking up military positions resulted in many legitimate Manchus being deprived of their rightful positions as soldiers in the Banner armies, resulting in the real Manchus unable to receive their salaries as Han Chinese infiltrators in the banners stole their social and economic status and rights. These Han Chinese infiltrators were said to be good military troops and their skills at marching and archery were up to par so that the Zhapu lieutenant general couldn't differentiate them from true Manchus in terms of military skills.

Manchu Banners contained a lot of "false Manchus" who were from Han Chinese civilian families but were adopted by Manchu bannermen after the Yongzheng reign. The Jingkou and Jiangning Mongol banners and Manchu Banners had 1,795 adopted Han Chinese and the Beijing Mongol Banners and Manchu Banners had 2,400 adopted Han Chinese in statistics taken from the 1821 census.

Despite Qing attempts to differentiate adopted Han Chinese from normal Manchu bannermen the differences between them became hazy. These adopted Han Chinese bondservants who managed to get themselves onto Manchu banner roles were called kaihu ren (開戶人) in Chinese and dangse faksalaha urse in Manchu. Normal Manchus were called jingkini Manjusa.

== See also ==
- Imperial Household Department
- Nucai
- Ejen
- Slavery in China
