= Hokkien pronouns =

- Pronoun
- Hàn-jī: 代名詞
- Pe̍h-ōe-jī: Tāi-bêng-sû
- Tâi-lô: tāi-bîng-sû
- Bbánpìng: dâibbíngsú

Hokkien pronouns pose some difficulty to speakers of English due to their complexity. The Hokkien language use a variety of differing demonstrative and interrogative pronouns, and many of them are only with slightly different meanings.

== Basic personal pronouns ==
The plural personal pronouns tend to be nasalized forms of the singular ones.

	Singular			Plural		
	Chinese character	vernacular / colloquial	literary	Chinese character	vernacular / colloquial	literary
First person	我	góa	ngó͘	阮	goán / gún (exclusive)	-
First person	俺	án (possessive determiner)	-	咱	lán (inclusive)	-
Second person	汝	lí	lú	恁	lín	-
Third person	伊	i	i	𪜶	in	-

== List of Hokkien personal pronouns ==
Pe̍h-ōe-jī	Hàn-jī	Level of speech	Gender	Grammatical number	Notes
– first person –
chū-kí	自己	formal, written	neutral	singular	
góa	我	formal / informal	neutral	singular	
góa-lâng	我儂	informal	neutral	plural	儂 (-lâng) is typically suffixed for plural in Southeast Asian Hokkien dialects. (see also list of pluralising suffixes, below)
goán	阮	formal / informal	neutral	plural	Exclusive
gún	阮	informal	females, rarely males	singular	阮 (gún only, not goán) is typically used in Taiwanese Hokkien lyrics.
goán	阮	informal	neutral	singular	
ka-kī	家己	formal / informal	neutral	singular	
ka-kī-lâng	家己儂	informal	neutral	plural	儂 (-lâng) is suffixed for plural. Here, it is not only used in Southeast Asian Hokkien dialects, but also in Chinese Hokkien and Taiwanese Hokkien. (see also list of pluralising suffixes, below)
kò-jîn	個人	formal	neutral	singular	
lán	咱	formal / informal	neutral	plural	Inclusive
lán-lâng	咱儂	informal	neutral	plural	儂 (-lâng) is typically suffixed for plural in Southeast Asian Hokkien dialects. (see also list of pluralising suffixes, below)
lâng	儂	informal	neutral	singular	It originally means "person".
lín-chó͘-má	恁祖媽	very informal, rude	females	singular	It originally means "your grandmother".
lín-pē	恁父	very informal, rude	males	singular	It originally means "your father".
ngó͘	吾 / 我	formal, written	neutral	singular	
sió-seng	小生	formal, written	males	singular	
– second person –
chiok-hā	足下	formal, written	males	singular	
koh-hā	閣下	formal, written	males	singular	
kun	君	formal, written	males	singular	
lí	汝	formal / informal	neutral	singular	
lín	恁	formal / informal	neutral	plural	
lín-lâng	恁儂	informal	neutral	plural	儂 (-lâng) is typically suffixed for plural in Southeast Asian Hokkien dialects. (see also list of pluralising suffixes, below)
– third person –
i	伊	formal / informal	neutral	singular	
i-lâng	伊儂	informal	neutral	plural	儂 (-lâng) is typically suffixed for plural in Southeast Asian Hokkien dialects. (see also list of pluralising suffixes, below)
in	𪜶	formal / informal	neutral	plural	
lâng	儂	informal	neutral	singular	It originally means "person".

=== Archaic personal pronouns ===
Pe̍h-ōe-jī	Hàn-jī	Level of speech	Gender	Meaning	Notes
chhiap-sin	妾身	formal	females	I	It means "concubine" or "mistress". It is seldom used in modern societies.
pē-hā	陛下	formal, written	neutral, emperors, kings, queens	You	
tiān-hā	殿下	formal, written	neutral, princes, princesses	You	

== Suffixes ==
Suffixes are added to pronouns to make them plural.

Pe̍h-ōe-jī	Hàn-jī	Level of speech	Gender	Examples	Notes
lâng	儂	informal	neutral	我儂, góa-lâng (we); 家己儂, ka-kī-lâng (we); 咱儂, lán-lâng (we); 恁儂, lín-lâng (you); 伊儂, i-lâng (they)	儂 (-lâng) is typically suffixed for plural in Southeast Asian Hokkien dialects, but some of them like ka-kī-lâng (we) is also used in Chinese and Taiwanese Hokkien.

== Demonstrative and interrogative pronouns ==
Usually, Hokkien pronouns are prefixed with ch- for thing or things near the speaker, and h- for one or ones distant from the speaker.

Pe̍h-ōe-jī	Hàn-jī	Meaning
che	此 / 即 / 這	this thing (near the speaker)
he	彼 / 許	that thing (distant from the speaker)
tó-chi̍t-ê	佗一个	which thing(s)?
chit-ê	此个 / 即个 / 這个	this (near the speaker)
chia-ê	遮个	these (near the speaker)
hit-ê	彼个 / 許个	that (distant from the speaker)
hia-ê	遐个	those (distant from the speaker)
chia	遮	here (near the speaker)
hia	遐	there (distant from the speaker)
tó-ūi	佗位	where

== See also ==
- Hokkien language
- Hokkien grammar
- Hokkien numerals
