= Chinese honorifics =

Polite forms of address

Chinese honorifics (Chinese: 敬語; pinyin: Jìngyǔ) and honorific language are words, word constructs, and expressions in the Chinese language that convey self-deprecation, social respect, politeness, or deference. Once ubiquitously employed in ancient China, a large percent has fallen out of use in the contemporary Chinese lexicon. The promotion of vernacular Chinese during the New Culture Movement (新文化運動 or 五四文化運動) of the 1910s and 1920s in China further hastened the demise of a large body of Chinese honorifics previously preserved in the vocabulary and grammar of Classical Chinese.

Although Chinese honorifics have simplified to a large degree, contemporary Chinese still retains a sizable set of honorifics. Many of the classical constructs are also occasionally employed by contemporary speakers to convey formality, humility, politeness or respect. Usage of classical Chinese honorifics is also found frequently in contemporary Chinese literature and television or cinematic productions that are set in the historical periods. Honorific language in Chinese is achieved by using honorific or beautifying alternatives, prefixing or suffixing a word with a polite complement, or by dropping casual-sounding words.

In general, there are five distinct categories of honorific language:

- Respectful Language (敬辭; Jìngcí), which is used when referring to others to show deference and politeness.
- Humble Language (謙辭; Qiāncí), which is used when referring to oneself in a self-deprecating manner to show humbleness and humility.
- Indirect Language (婉辭; Wǎncí), which is the use of euphemisms or tactful language to approach sensitive topics and show respect.
- Courteous Language (客套語; Kètàoyǔ), which employs praising and laudatory words or phrases with the intent to flatter the addressee.
- Elegant Language (雅語; Yáyǔ), which employs elegant and beautiful expressions and words in lieu of more casual words and phrases to describe people, objects, actions or concepts. It is often used on occasions where casual language may be deemed inappropriate. Due to the lack of equivalent expressions in English, translated phrases often do not convey the same sense of beauty or elegance.

Because of its widespread usage as a Lingua Franca, Mandarin Chinese is used herein synonymously with the term "contemporary Chinese". Variations in honorifics used and their usage exist in the other Sinitic languages, as well as among the various Mandarin dialects.

== Introduction ==
The term 知書達禮 (Literally -- one who knows the books and achieves proper mannerism) has been used to praise and characterize those of high academic and moral accomplishments and those of proper manner and conduct. Using the proper honorific or humble forms of address and other parts of speech toward oneself and toward others is an important element or requirement in the proper observation of 禮儀 (lǐyí, etiquette, formality, and rite). Honorific parts of speech include pronoun substitutes, modified nouns, proper nouns, and pronouns, modified verbs, honorific adjectives, honorific 成語 (chéngyǔ, "canned phrases/idioms"), and honorific alternatives for other neutral or deprecating words.

In ancient China, myriad humble and respectful forms of address, in lieu of personal pronouns and names, were used for various social relationships and situations. The choice of a pronoun substitute was often in adherence to the concepts of 尊卑(zūnbēi) (Lit. above-beneath / superior-subordinate, “social hierarchy”), 貴賤(guìjiàn) (Lit. worthy-worthless, "social class"), and 輩分(bèifèn) ("seniority") or 輩(bèi) for short.

=== Social hierarchy and class ===
In the Confucian philosophical classic of 易傳·繫辭上(yìzhuàn xìcí shàng) or "Yizhuan - Xici"—a latter day commentary on the book of 易經(yìjīng) or "I Ching" ("Book of Changes"), it is stated "天尊地卑，乾坤定矣。卑高以陳，貴賤位矣。" -- it was believed in ancient China that both the order of nature, i.e., 天尊地卑 (heaven be above, earth be beneath), and from it the derived order of man, were long predetermined and dictated by the heavens, e.g., 君尊臣卑 (king be above/superior, court officials be beneath/subordinate), 男尊女卑 (man superior, woman subordinate), 夫尊婦卑 (husband superior, wife subordinate), and 父尊子卑 (father superior, son subordinate) etc. Every king and their subject, every man and woman, every husband and wife, and every father and son, should naturally follow this predetermined order and practice proper 禮儀(lǐyí) and conduct. As a large part of 禮儀(lǐyí), proper speech was of great importance.

Therefore in speech, among other forms of 禮儀(lǐyí) and social behaviors, the "subordinate" or "inferior" would employ self-deprecating and humble language towards self and respectful language towards the "superior" as a recognition of their relative places in the "natural" hierarchy. On the other hand, the "superiors" would often also use humble language as a display of humility and virtue. Unsurprisingly, the characters 尊~ and 卑~ also became honorific and humble prefixes, respectively. For example, the humble substitute 卑下(bēixià)(this inferior one below) would be used, among other deprecating substitutes, in place of the pronoun "I", and the honorific substitute 尊上(zūnshàng) (the superior one above) would replace the pronoun "you" (later also used for "your parents").

Related to 尊卑(zūnbēi) is the concept of 貴賤(guìjiàn). Those with power, money and status were 貴 (worthy, honorable), and those without were 賤 (worthless, despised). These two characters also became the honorific and humble prefixes 貴~ and 賤~. Examples: 貴國 (your honorable country), 貴庚 (your honorable age), 貴姓 (your honorable surname), 貴公司 (your honorable company), and 賤姓 (my unworthy surname), 賤民 (the unworthy and despised commoner), 賤妾 (this unworthy wife of yours), 賤内 (my unworthy wife), etc. 貴~ remains a commonly used honorific prefix to this day.

=== Seniority ===
Likewise, those of a junior 輩份(bèifèn) (i.e., 晚輩(wǎnbèi) or 後輩(hòubèi)) would show respect and deference to their 前輩(qiánbeì) ("senior"), 長輩(zhǎngbeì) or 先輩(xiānbeì) ("elder"), and 祖輩(zǔbeì) ("ancestors"). 辈分(bèifèn) is not necessarily based on age, for example, a younger person who entered a school or profession before an older person would be considered the 前輩(qiánbeì). A person who is much younger than his/her nephew in a large extended family would still be a 長輩(zhǎngbeì) to the nephew. If two people are of the same 輩份(bèifèn) (i.e., 平輩(píngbeì) or 同輩(tóngbeì)), then either experience or age would determine the hierarchy depending on the situation.

Contemporary Chinese mostly abandoned the 尊卑(zūnbēi) and 貴賤(guìjiàn) distinctions (especially 卑 and 賤) in its honorific practice, but retains elements of the 輩份(bèifèn) distinctions. For example, the suffixes ~姐(jiě) (Lit. elder sister) and ~哥(gē) (Lit. elder brother) are commonly used by junior people when addressing their 平辈(píngbeì) seniors. Those of the next higher 輩份(bèifèn) (i.e., 長輩(zhǎngbeì)) acquire the suffixes ~姨，~叔 etc. Those even higher in 輩份(bèifèn) receive the suffixes ~婆，~公，~伯 etc. When addressing a 平輩(píngbeì) junior, the suffixes ~妹, ~弟 are used. While these suffixes derived from kinship names, they are commonly used between unrelated people. Example: when addressing a group leader at work whose name is 芳(fāng)，the less experienced person in the group might call her 芳姐 Fāng-jiě. Because these suffixes have an age connotation, their use and application are not always appropriate. Variations were created such as ~小哥哥 (Lit. little elder brother)， ~小姐姐 (Lit. little elder sister) to soften age connotations. A wrong 輩份(bèifèn) suffix can also be used intentionally to please or belittle another person. For example, some older women may prefer a ～姨 rather than ～婆 suffix, and a middle age woman may prefer to still be called ~姐 rather than ~姨. When these suffixes are used without a preceding name, or when a name is not complemented by one of these suffixes, the intimacy prefix 阿(ā)~ is often added. 阿(ā) is a functional particle without an actual meaning by itself, but when combined with a name (e.g., 阿芳，阿強) or with one of the 輩份(bèifèn) related suffixes (e.g., 阿哥，阿姨，阿伯，阿婆), 阿(ā) adds a sense of intimacy (i.e., closeness, affection) with the addressed. 阿(ā) can be used together with a 輩份(bèifèn) suffix, e.g., 阿芳姐 (ā-Fāng-jiě)，阿强哥 (ā-Qiáng-gē). Other related honorific modifiers include 老~，大~，小~，~總，~董, see noun complements section below for more details.

=== Honorific verbs ===
Like nouns and proper nouns, some Chinese verbs can also be complemented with an honorific modifier. For example, the verbs 告(gào) ("to tell"), 還(huán) ("to return")，陪(péi) ("to accompany"), 勸(quàn) ("to urge")，送(sòng) ("to gift") can be complemented by the honorific prefix 奉(fèng)~ (Lit. to offer respectfully) to form the more polite versions 奉告 (I respectfully tell you), 奉還 (I respectfully return to you), 奉陪 (I respectfully accompany you), 奉勸 (I respectfully urge you), and 奉送 (I respectfully gift you). Another example is the honorific prefix 恭(gōng)~ (Lit. "look forward to respectfully"), e.g., 恭賀 (I respectfully congratulate you), 恭候 (I respectfully await you), 恭請 (I respectfully invite you)，恭迎 (I respectfully welcome you). The addition of the honorific prefix turns these verbs into a politer version. Unlike adverbs, the prefixes are often verbs themselves, and the compounded honorific verb functions as a single language unit (i.e., a single verb). Other common prefixes for verbs and verb examples are summarized in the verb complements section below.

=== Grammar ===
In practice, many of the honorific compound words are used as canned polite word alternatives, rather than being grammatically composed as people speak. There is not a systemic rule in Chinese grammar to alter words (e.g., conjugation or other inflections) for the purpose of increasing speech politeness, though the same effect can often be achieved. However, in letters (書信(shūxìn)，家書(jiāshū)) and official documents (公文(gōngwén)), a complex system of honorifics and rule sets exists.

== Examples of honorific speech ==
Example 1:

你(nǐ) 姓(xìng) 甚麼(shénmè) ？
你(nǐ) 姓(xìng) 什么(shénme) ？
"What is your family name (surname)?"

The sentence above is a perfectly acceptable question when addressing others of equal or lower status (e.g., addressing a junior or a child). To increase politeness, e.g., if the addressee is of higher status or the person asking the question wants to show more respect, several changes may be employed:

1. The honorific prefix 請 (lit. to request) + verb 問 (to ask) (qǐngwèn, "May I please ask..."; lit. [I] request to ask) may be added
2. The regular second-person pronoun 你 (nǐ, "you") may be replaced by the honorific second-person pronoun 您 (nín, "you" [courteous])
3. The honorific prefix 貴 (guì, lit. "worthy", "honorable") may be added before 姓 (xìng, "family name"); 姓 is used as a verb (i.e., "to have the family name of").
4. If the honorific prefix 貴 is added, the contemporary interrogative pronoun 甚麽 (shénme, "what") is usually dropped.

The resulting sentence:

請(qǐng) 問(wèn) 您(nín) 貴姓(guìxìng) ？
请(qǐng) 问(wèn) 您(nín) 贵姓(guìxìng) ？
"May I (respectfully) request to ask you (whom I cherish) for your honorable surname?"

is more polite and commonly used among people in formal situations.

Example 2:

小姐(xiáojiě)，你(nǐ)多大(duōdà)了(le)？
"Miss, how old are you?"

The above can be changed to a more polite question by employing the honorific prefix 敢 (lit. to dare) + verb 問 (to ask) (gǎnwèn, "[May I] dare to ask..."), and honorific prefix 芳 (fāng, lit. fragrant, virtuous, beautiful) + noun 齡 (líng, age).

敢問(gǎnwèn)小姐(xiáojiě)芳齡(fānglíng)?
敢问(gǎnwèn)小姐(xiáojiě)芳龄(fānglíng)?
"May I dare to ask for this Miss's age (of fragrance and beauty)?"

The second-person pronoun 你 ("you") is substituted entirely by the honorific title 小姐 ("Miss") in this case. This latter way of questioning is more of classical usage, but is still occasionally used in contemporary Chinese. It is also an example of elegant speech (雅語(yáyǔ)).

== Categorization ==
In general, there are several types of honorifics used in the Chinese language as described below.

=== Respectful language ===
敬語(jìngyǔ) - Respectful Language employs modified words or substitutes called 敬辭(jìngcí) (Lit. respectful vocabulary) that convey a sense of respect for the addressee. For example:

- 令愛(lìng'ài): Lit. the beautiful and beloved -- Your daughter; the honorific prefix 令~ replaces the pronoun "your".
- 令千金(lìngqiānjīn): Lit. the beautiful one who is worth a thousand gold -- Your daughter.
- 貴寶號(guìbǎohào): Lit. the highly valued precious banner—Your business; the honorific prefix 貴~ replaces the pronoun "your", and the prefix 寳~ modifies 號 to form an honorific substitute for someone's business.

=== Humble language ===
謙語(qiānyǔ) - Humble Language employs modified words or substitutes called 謙辭(qiāncí) (Lit. humble vocabulary) that convey a sense of self-deprecation and humility for the speaker. For example:

- 在下(zàixià): Lit. this one who is beneath you -- used as pronoun "I"
- 寒舍(hánshè): Lit. Humble and Insignificant Residence -- my home
- 賤内(jiànnèi): Lit. the worthless despised one inside—my wife

=== Indirect language ===
婉語(wǎnyǔ) - Indirect Language employs words called 婉辭(wǎncí) (Lit. indirect vocabulary - e.g., euphemisms) that are used to hide or beautify an otherwise unfortunate event or action. For example:

- 歸天(guītiān): Lit. return to heaven -- to have died
- 挂彩(guàcaǐ): Lit. to hang colorful decorations—to have been shot
- 冤家(yuānjia): Lit. destined/mortal enemies—often used to mean lovers

=== Courteous language ===
客套語(kètàoyǔ) - Courteous Language employs specific words or phrases that have courteous and praising connotations intended to flatter the addressee. For example:

- 不敢高攀(bùgǎn gāopān): Lit. dare not climb up high to you -- I dare not compare myself to you
- 久仰大名(jiúyǎng dàmíng): Lit. long admired big name -- I've known and admired you for a long time; used when meeting someone you've heard of (not necessarily admired).
- 高擡貴手(gāotái guìshǒu): Lit. lift up high honorable hand -- Please be magnanimous and don't hurt me (i.e., stop doing what you intend to do to me)

=== Elegant language ===
雅語(yáyǔ) - Elegant Language employs elegant or beautiful expressions and words in lieu of everyday casual words and phrases to describe people, objects, actions or concepts. It is often used on occasions where casual language may be inappropriate. Due to the lack of equivalent expressions in English, the translated phrases often do not convey the same sense of beauty or elegance. Examples:

- 紅顔知己(hóngyán zhījǐ): Lit. red face / know self—beautiful beloved girlfriend ("red" refers to the make up or the natural color on a beautiful young woman's face; "know self" means someone who knows one well as in the close friendship between lovers). Compared to the casual alternative: 情人 or 女朋友 (lover / girlfriend)
- 請用茶(qǐng yòngchá): Lit please use tea—please have some tea. Compared to the casual alternative: 喝茶吧 (Lit. "drink tea")
- 請慢用(qǐng mànyòng): Lit. please take your time to use—please enjoy [your meal]. Compared to the casual alternative: 你们慢慢吃 (Lit. "you guys eat slowly")
- 請代為美言幾句(qǐng dàiwéi měiyán jǐjù): Lit. please on my behalf beautify some of your language—please say something nice about me/my situation in front of... Compared to the casual alternative: 幫我說幾句好話啊 (Lit. "help me say some good words")

== Honorific and humble forms of address ==
敬辭(jìngcí) (respectful vocabulary) and 謙辭(qiāncí) (humble vocabulary) are frequently found in the various forms of address in the Chinese language. Below is a collection of the better known honorific forms of address that have been used at one time or another in the Chinese lexicon. Although many are obsolete in usage, most remain relevant in contemporary literature and in the understanding of the Chinese language. Pronunciations given are those of today's Mandarin Chinese. Because of the vast number and complexity, the list provided is intended for reference rather than completeness.

=== First-person ===
When referring to oneself in ancient China, people avoided first-person pronouns ("I", "me", "we", and "us"). Instead, a third-person descriptor was used, which varied according to the situation. Referring to oneself in the third-person could be used arrogantly as well, to assert one's superiority or dominance over one's audience. This was most common in the imperial middle management – the imperial consorts, the military, and the imperial bureaucracy (e.g., 本官，本將軍，本宮，本大爺), with the emperor instead often describing himself in sorrowful terms out of respect for his deceased father (e.g., 孤王 "This Orphaned King"，寡人 "This Lonesome Man").

For the same reasons, and to a much lesser degree, the first-person pronouns are sometimes avoided also in contemporary usage. Often, the generic self-referencing prefix 本~，该~， or a humble / self-deprecating prefix such as 敝~ is used with a third-person descriptor, for example: 本人是来自甲公司的，敝公司想跟您做个访问。-- Literally, "This person is from company A, this unkempt company would like to do an interview with you." translated to "I am from company A, we would like to do an interview with you."

Provided below are some first-person honorific substitutes and usages. Their relevancy (i.e., contemporary vs. classical) and gender association are also indicated. Plurals ("we", "us") in classical Chinese are formed by the suffixes ~等 or ~众人 etc., and in contemporary Chinese by ~们. A "classical usage" designation does not preclude usage in contemporary speech or writing, as contemporary Chinese often incorporates classical elements, though it is much less likely to be seen or used in the contemporary context.

==== Commoners and the humble ====
The following directly replace the pronoun "I" in usage by commoners or people of low social status. Example: rather than 吾(我)以為此方不可 - "I think this idea will not work" one would say 愚以為此方不可 - "This unintelligent one thinks this idea will not work."

Traditional Chinese	Old Chinese	Simplified Chinese	Pinyin	Literal Meaning	Meaning in Usage	Gender	Contemporary or Classical Usage	Notes
在下	*dzˤəʔgˤraʔ	在下	zàixià	This one who is beneath you	I, me	Male	Contemporary and Classical	Occasionally used in contemporary Chinese. Also 下走 in classical.
本人	*pˤənʔniŋ	本人	běnrén	This person	I, me	Neutral	Contemporary and Classical	This is not necessarily a humble substitute, but is sometimes preferred over the pronoun "I" for formality.
人家	niŋkˤra	人家	rénjiā	This other person/people	I, me	Neutral	Contemporary and Classical	Usually used by a child, or a grown woman who tries to act childish or submissive. Often used as a form of sajiao (i.e., acting cute).
老粗		老粗	lǎocū	This uneducated chap	I, me	Neutral	Contemporary and Classical	老~ ("Old") is a recurring prefix. Also “大老粗”，“大老粗兒”，“老粗兒”
愚		愚	yú	This unintelligent one	I, me	Male	Classical	愚~ is also a humble prefix: 愚兄 (this unintelligent senior brother/friend of yours), 愚见 (my unintelligent opinion) Also 蒙.
鄙人	*prəʔniŋ	鄙人	bǐrén	This lowly/unlearned one	I, me	Male	Classical	鄙~ is also a humble prefix: 鄙意 (my humble intent), 鄙见 (my humble opinion)
敝人	*bet-sniŋ	敝人	bìrén	This unkempt/ragged one	I, me	Male	Classical	敝~ is also a humble prefix: 敝校 (this school), 敝公司 (this company), 敝处 (this home/place)
卑下	*pegˤraʔ	卑下	bēixià	This inferior one	I, me	Male	Classical	
竊	*tsʰˤet	窃	qiè	This humble one	I	Male	Classical	Employed by one in lower position when providing a suggestion or opinion: 窃以为 (I think) Also “窃闻”, “窃思”. 窃 means in private. Using of 窃 implies that I am not entitled, or privileged, to speak to you in public so i have to speak to you in private, which implies that I am the humble one.
僕(人)	*bˤok	仆(人)	pú (rén)	This servant	I, me	Male	Classical	Literally, "charioteer"
婢(女)	*beʔ	婢(女)	bì (nǚ)	This servant	I, me	Female	Classical	
妾(身）	*tsʰap	妾(身）	qiè (shēn)	This consort	I, me	Female	Classical	
賤妾	*dzen-stsʰap	贱妾	jiànqiè	This worthless consort	I, me	Female	Classical	
小人	*sewʔniŋ	小人	xiǎorén	This little man	I, me	Male	Classical	小~ (Lit. small, insignificant) is a recurring humble prefix.
小女(子)	*sewʔnraʔ	小女(子)	xiǎonǚ(zǐ)	This little woman	I, me	Female	Classical	小~ (Lit. small, insignificant) is a recurring humble prefix.
草民	*tsʰˤuʔmiŋ	草民	cǎomín	This worthless commoner	I, me	Male	Classical	
民女	*miŋnraʔ	民女	mínnǚ	This common woman	I, me	Female	Classical	
奴才	*nˤadzˤə	奴才	núcai	This slave	I, me	Male	Classical	Also used by servants and even low-level officials who are not literally slaves, especially in later dynasties.
奴婢	*nˤabeʔ	奴婢	núbì	This slave	I, me	Female	Classical	Also used by servants who are not literally slaves, especially in later dynasties. 奴 and 婢 were sometimes used alone for the same meaning.
奴家	*nˤakˤra	奴家	nújiā	This slave of yours	I, me	Female	Classical	Can be used with strangers by a woman to show humbleness.

==== Royalty ====
The following directly replace the first person pronoun "I" in usage by the royalty. For kings and emperors, gender is assumed to be male for simplicity, because the overwhelming majority of Chinese kings and emperors were men, with only a few exceptions. Sometimes the generic self-referencing prefix 本~ was used with the speaker's title. For example, 本贵人。

Traditional Chinese	Old Chinese	Simplified Chinese	Pinyin	Literal Meaning	Meaning in Usage	Gender	Contemporary or Classical Usage	Notes
孤(王)/(家)	*kʷˤa	孤(王)/(家)	gū(wáng)(jiā)	This orphaned one	I, me	Male	Classical	Employed by the king out of respect for his father, who usually (though not always) had predeceased him
寡(人)	*kʷˤraʔ(niŋ)	寡(人)	guǎ(rén)	This lonesome one	I, me	Male	Classical	As above
不穀	*pəqˤok	不谷	bùgǔ	This grainless one	I, me	Male	Classical	Employed by the emperor out of modesty regarding his administration (cf. the importance of the Five Grains), particularly compared to his father's rule
予一人		予一人	yǘyìrén	This solitary one	I, me	Male	Classical	Employed exclusively by the Pre-Qin kings of China.
朕	*lrəmʔ	朕	zhèn	I	I, me	Male	Classical	The original generic first-person pronoun, arrogated to the emperors during the reign of Shi Huangdi. Comparable to the royal we.
本王		本王	běnwáng	This king / This Nobleman	I, me	Male	Classical	Originally by pre-imperial kings. Later by royalty and nobleman with the title: 王爷. 本~ ("This") is a recurring prefix.
哀家	*ʔˤəjkˤra	哀家	āijiā	This sad house	I, me	Female	Classical	Employed by the emperor's mother out of respect for her deceased husband
本宮		本宫	běngōng	This one of the palace	I, me	Female	Classical	Employed by an empress or a high-ranking consort when speaking to a person or an audience of lower rank or status 本~ ("This") is a recurring prefix.
臣妾	*gintsʰap	臣妾	chénqiè	This subject and consort	I, me	Female	Classical	Employed by the empress and consorts before the emperor. 妾身 is also used.
兒臣	*ŋegin	儿臣	érchén	This child and subject	I, me	Neutral	Classical	Employed by the emperor before the empress dowager and by the imperial family before their parents or the emperor's other consorts

==== Government and military ====
The following directly replace the first person pronoun "I" in usage by government and military officials.

Traditional Chinese	Old Chinese	Simplified Chinese	Pinyin	Literal Meaning	Meaning in Usage	Gender	Contemporary or Classical Usage	Notes
臣	*gin	臣	chén	This subject	I, me	Neutral	Classical	Employed by officials when addressing the emperor, based on a word that originally meant "slave" during the Zhou dynasty.
下官	*gˤraʔkʷˤan	下官	xiàguān	This lowly official	I, me	Neutral	Classical	Employed by officials when addressing other bureaucrats of higher rank
末官	*mˤatkʷˤan	末官	mòguān	This lesser official	I, me	Neutral	Classical	As above.
小吏	*sewʔrəʔ‑s	小吏	xiǎolì	This little clerk	I, me	Neutral	Classical	As above. 小~ (Lit. small, insignificant) is a recurring humble prefix.
卑職	*petək	卑职	bēizhí	This inferior office	I, me	Neutral	Classical	Employed by officials when addressing their patrons or other bureaucrats of equal rank
屬下		属下	shǔxià	This subordinate of yours	I, me	Neutral	Classical	Used by subordinates in front of their superior officer or leader
末將	*mˤattsaŋ‑s	末将	mòjiàng	This lesser commander	I, me	Neutral	Classical	Employed by military officers when addressing other officers of higher rank
本府		本府	běnfǔ	This office	I, me	Neutral	Classical	Employed by officials when addressing other bureaucrats of lower rank. Commonly found in fiction. 本~ ("This") is a recurring prefix.
本官	*pˤənʔkʷˤan	本官	běnguān	This Official	I, me	Neutral	Classical	Employed by officials when addressing those of lower status 本~ ("This") is a recurring prefix.
本帥	*pˤənʔs‑rut‑s	本帅	běnshuài	This Marshal	I, me	Neutral	Classical	Employed by general officers when addressing their commanders 本~ ("This") is a recurring prefix.
本將軍	*pˤənʔtsaŋ‑skʷər	本将军	běnjiāngjun	This General	I, me	Neutral	Classical	Employed by general officers when addressing their commanders 本~ ("This") is a recurring prefix.

==== Elderly ====
The following directly replace the first person pronoun "I" in usage by the elderly.

Traditional Chinese	Old Chinese	Simplified Chinese	Pinyin	Literal Meaning	Meaning in Usage	Gender	Contemporary or Classical Usage	Notes
老朽	*rˤuʔqʰuʔ	老朽	lǎoxiǔ	This old and senile one	I, me	Neutral	Contemporary and Classical	老~ ("Old") is a recurring prefix.
老拙	*rˤuʔtot	老拙	lǎozhuó	This old and clumsy one	I, me	Neutral	Contemporary and Classical	老~ ("Old") is a recurring prefix.
老漢	*rˤuʔn̥ˤar-s	老汉	lǎohàn	This old man	I, me	Male	Contemporary and Classical	老~ ("Old") is a recurring prefix.
老夫	*rˤuʔpa	老夫	lǎofū	This old man	I, me	Male	Classical	老~ ("Old") is a recurring prefix.
老身	*rˤuʔn̥iŋ	老身	lǎoshēn	This old body	I, me	Female	Classical	老~ ("Old") is a recurring prefix.

==== Academia and religion ====
The following directly replace the first person pronoun "I" in usage by scholars and monks.

Traditional Chinese	Old Chinese	Simplified Chinese	Pinyin	Literal Meaning	Meaning in Usage	Gender	Contemporary or Classical Usage	Notes
小生	*sewʔsreŋ	小生	xiǎoshēng	This later-born one	I, me	Neutral	Contemporary and Classical	Literally "smaller-born" but Chinese uses the idea of "big" and "small" in reference to age – e.g., 你多大? ("How big are you?") is a question about one's age and not about height or weight. Occasionally used in contemporary Chinese. 小~ (Lit. small, insignificant) is a recurring humble prefix.
晚輩		晚辈	wǎnbèi	This later-born one	I, me	Neutral	Contemporary and Classical	Literally "[belonging to a] later generation" 晚~("late") is a recurring humble prefix.
不肖	*pəsew‑s	不肖	búxiào	This unequal one	I, me	Neutral	Contemporary and Classical	Literally "unlike", but implying the speaker is unequal to the capability and talent of his audience. Often used as a prefix: 不肖子，不肖女，不肖徒
晚生	*morʔsreŋ	晚生	wǎnshēng	This later-born one	I, me	Neutral	Classical	晚~("late") is a recurring humble prefix. Also 侍生.
晚學	*morʔm‑kˤruk	晚学	wǎnxué	This later-taught one	I, me	Neutral	Classical	晚~("late") is a recurring humble prefix. 后学 and 后进 were also used.
不才	*pədzˤə	不才	bùcái	This inept one	I, me	Neutral	Classical	不~("not") is a recurring humble prefix, usually used to negate a desired quality to self-deprecate.
不佞		不佞	búnìng	This incapable one	I, me	Neutral	Classical	不~("not") is a recurring humble prefix, usually used to negate a desired quality to self-deprecate.
老衲		老衲	lǎonà	This old and patched one	I, me	Male	Classical	Employed by monks, in reference to their tattered robes. Used by senior/older monks.
貧僧		贫僧	pínsēng	This penniless monk	I, me	Male	Classical	贫~("poor") is a recurring humble prefix.
貧尼		贫尼	pínní	This penniless nun	I, me	Female	Classical	贫~("poor") is a recurring humble prefix.
貧道	*brənkə.lˤuʔ	贫道	píndào	This penniless priest/priestess	I, me	Neutral	Classical	Employed by Taoist adepts 贫~("poor") is a recurring humble prefix.

==== Pejorative slang ====
In some parts of China, the following are used in place of "I" to indicate contempt for the listener, to assert the superiority of oneself, or when teasing:

- 老子 (Lǎozi, not to be confused with Laozi the philosopher, written the same way): I, your dad (referring to oneself as superior)
- 爺·爷 (Yé): I, your lord. Used in parts of Northern China
- 恁父 (Hokkien: lín-pē): I, your dad (referring to oneself as superior).
- 姑奶奶 (Gūnǎinai): lit. great-aunt. Also used to disparage a woman seen as self-aggrandizing.

When used towards a person less well known or on formal occasions, these terms are considered to be incredibly rude, and are usually used to purposely disgrace the addressee; however, it is less of an issue when spoken among close friends, though even some friends might still be offended by their use.

=== First-person possessive ===
Similarly, the possessive case "my" and "our" are avoided by virtue of being associated to the humble self. This is often achieved by a humble or self-deprecating prefix, while in other cases by an honorific substitute as described below.

==== Referring to own family ====
Humble substitutes are used by people when referring to their own family or family members, and replace terms such as my/our family, my wife, my husband, my/our father, my/our mother, my/our son, my/our daughter etc.

Traditional Chinese	Old Chinese	Simplified Chinese	Pinyin	Literal Meaning	Meaning in Usage	Gender	Contemporary or Classical Usage	Notes
家~	*kˤra	家~	jiā	Home	My/Our	Neutral	Contemporary and Classical	A prefix used when referring to living elder family members: my father (家父), my elder brother (家兄), &c.
舍~	*r̥ak-s	舍~	shě	House / Residence	My/Our	Neutral	Contemporary and Classical	Literally "my lodging-house's", a prefix used when referring to younger family members: my younger brother (舍弟), my younger sister (舍妹), my family or relative (舍親) &c.
愚~		愚~	yú	Unintelligent	My/Our	Neutral	Classical	A prefix used when referring to oneself and another family member: this unintelligent couple (愚夫婦), this unintelligent father and son (愚父子), these unintelligent brothers (愚兄弟), this unintelligent brother (愚兄)
先~ / 亡~	*sˤər	先~ / 亡~	xiān / wáng	Deceased...	My/Our	Neutral	Contemporary and Classical	Literally "first", a prefix used when referring to deceased elder family members: my late father (先父), my late elder brother (先兄). Others include 先考, 先慈, 先妣, 先贤. The 亡~ prefix is used in a similar manner.
內~	*nˤəp	内~	nèi	Inside	My	Female	Classical	A prefix used when referring to one's wife (内人, 内子, &c.)
寒舍	*ə.gˤanr̥ak-s	寒舍	hánshè	Humble Insignificant Residence	My/Our house		Contemporary and Classical	Literally "cold lodging-house"; could be used as a metonym for the family itself Also 舍間、舍下
拙荊	*totkreŋ	拙荆	zhuōjīng	Clumsy thorn	My wife	Female	Classical	Employed by men to refer to their wives Also 山荊、荊屋、山妻.
賤內	*dzen-snˤəp	贱内	jiànnèi	Worthless one inside	My wife	Female	Classical	Employed by men to refer to their wives
賤息		贱息	jiànxí	Worthless son	My son	Male	Classical	Also 息男
拙夫	*totpa	拙夫	zhuōfū	Clumsy man	My husband	Male	Classical	Employed by wives to refer to their husbands
犬子	*kʷʰˤenʔtsəʔ	犬子	quǎnzǐ	Dog son/child	My son	Male	Classical	Employed by parents to refer to their sons
小兒	*sewʔŋe	小儿	xiǎo'ér	Young child/son	My son	Neutral	Classical	Employed by parents to refer to their sons
小女	*sewʔnraʔ	小女	xiǎonǚ	Young girl/daughter	My daughter	Female	Classical	Employed by parents to refer to their daughters Also 息女

==== Referring to own affiliations ====
The generic self-referencing prefix 本~ or humble prefix 敝~ is prepended to the speaker's affiliated organization to form an honorific. For example, 敝校 ("our school"), 敝公司 ("our company"), and 本單位("our unit") are used instead of a plural pronoun (E.g. 我們- in 我們學校，我們公司).

==== Ceremonial ====
The following are commonly found in spiritual tablets and gravestones for family members.

Traditional Chinese	Simplified Chinese	Pinyin	Meaning	Notes
顯考	显考	xiǎnkǎo	(My) honorable late father	
顯妣	显妣	xiǎnbǐ	(My) honorable late mother	
祖考	祖考	zǔkǎo	Ancestral father	
祖妣	祖妣	zǔbǐ	Ancestral mother	

=== Second-person and third-person ===
The same concept of hierarchical speech and etiquette affects terms of address towards others. Often, the same honorific substitutes can be used for both second-person and third-person.

In contemporary Chinese (both spoken and written), the second-person singular pronoun 你 (nǐ, "you") can be substituted with its polite form 您 (nín, "you" [cherished]) to express politeness. In some cases, the addressee's profession or title can be used. In others, specific honorific substitutes are used, e.g., 閣下 (Lit. beneath your pavilion) is used instead of the pronoun "you" to show respect. Historically, many other honorific usages existed.

In contemporary usage, the pronouns 你/您，你們，他/她，and 他/她們 are sometimes appended redundantly to the honorific substitute. For example, when saying 請閣下您慢走, 您 is optionally inserted after 閣下. This is likely out of a contemporary habit to use actual pronouns in speech.

Provided below are some of the better known second-person or third-person honorific substitutes and usages.

==== Royalty ====
The following were honorifics used when people addressed the Royalty in ancient China. Often, imperial titles were also used as pronoun substitutes. For example, the emperor may address the empress by her title 皇后. A royal servant may address a princess as 公主. Not all royal titles are listed.

Traditional Chinese	Simplified Chinese	Pinyin	Literal Meaning	Meaning in Usage	Gender	Contemporary or Classical Usage	Notes
陛下	陛下	bìxià	Beneath the ceremonial ramp	Your/His Majesty	Male	Classical	The implied context is "Your Majesty, beneath whose ceremonial ramp [I am standing]". It was used by officials when they addressed the emperor directly.
聖上	圣上	shèngshàng	The Holy and Exalted One	Your/His Majesty	Male	Classical	May be used when addressing the emperor directly or when referring to the emperor in the third person. Also 君上， 皇上，王上，大王，九重天，萬乘， 聖主, 王, 上, 君 可汗、單于 used for some minority rulers of China.
聖駕	圣驾	shèngjià	Holy procession	His Majesty	Male	Classical	Used when referring to the emperor in the third person, especially when the emperor was on the move.
天子	天子	tiānzǐ	The Son of Heaven	His Majesty	Male	Classical	One of the titles of the emperor.
萬歲	万岁	wànsuì	Of Ten Thousand Years.	Your/His Majesty	Male	Classical	"Ten thousand" is often used for an unspecified large number, analogous to "myriad" in English. "Years" here refers specifically to years of age. It may be roughly translated as "Long live the Emperor!".
萬歲爺	万岁爷	wànsuìyé	Lord of Ten Thousand Years	Your/His Majesty	Male	Classical	An informal way of addressing the emperor. Usually used by the emperor's personal attendants.
皇帝	皇帝	huángdì	Emperor	You	Male	Classical	Used by the emperor's parents or grandparents.
父皇 / 父王 / 父君 / 父帝	父皇 / 父王 / 父君 / 父帝	fùhuáng / fùwáng / fùjūn / fùdì	Imperial Father / Royal Father	Your Majesty / My Imperial or Royal Father	Male	Classical	Used by descendants of the emperor/king in pre-Qing dynasties. In the Qing dynasty, the Manchurian variant 皇阿玛 is used.
母后	母后	mǔhòu	Queen Mother	Your Royal Highness / My Imperial or Royal Mother	Female	Classical	Used by descendants of the empress/queen pre-Qing dynasties. In the Qing dynasty, the Manchurian variant 皇额娘 is used. Similar honorifics include 母妃, 母嫔
太后	太后	tàihòu	Empress Dowager	Your Royal Highness / My Imperial or Royal Grandmother	Female	Classical	Also 皇太后，皇祖母 by her royal descendants.
娘娘	娘娘	niángniang	Lady	Your/Her Royal Highness，My Lady	Female	Classical	Can be used alone or as a suffix ~娘娘 after an imperial title, for example: 皇后娘娘 ("Empress Your Highness")
殿下	殿下	diànxià	Beneath your palace	Your Royal Highness	Neutral	Classical	Used when addressing members of the imperial family, such as princes and princesses. Can be used as a suffix ~殿下, for example: 公主殿下， 王子殿下
千歲	千岁	qiānsùi	Of One Thousand Years	Your Royal Highness	Neutral	Classical	Literally "one thousand years", used to address Empresses, Dowagers, Crown Princes and other high-ranking imperials. The Taiping Rebellion also had a particular rank system based on how many "thousand years" a lord is entitled to.
先帝	先帝	xiāndì	Late emperor	The late emperor	Male	Classical	Referring to the deceased former emperor.

==== Government and military ====
The following were used when addressing government and military officials. Often, their title (e.g., 丞相，将军) can be used alone or as a suffix after their family name to form an honorific.

Traditional Chinese	Simplified Chinese	Pinyin	Literal Meaning	Meaning in Usage	Gender	Contemporary or Classical Usage	Notes
麾下	麾下	huīxià	Beneath your flag	You, Sir	Neutral	Classical	Used when addressing generals and military officers. 节下 was also used.
卿	卿	qīng	Official	You, My subject	Neutral	Classical	Used by the emperor and members of the imperial family when they address officials. Examples: 愛卿 (my dear subject) etc.
大人	大人	dàren	Significant Person	You, Sir	Neutral	Classical	A honorific used for an official or a person in authority. Can be used as an honorific suffix ~大人 after a title or a name. Examples: 知府大人，张大人

==== Acquaintances and friends ====
The following honorifics are used to address acquaintances or friends.

Traditional Chinese	Simplified Chinese	Pinyin	Literal Meaning	Meaning in Usage	Gender	Contemporary or Classical Usage	Notes
閣下	阁下	géxià	Beneath your pavilion	Your Excellency	Neutral	Contemporary and Classical	Used when addressing important people, or to show respect to the person. Equivalent to Excellency. Can be used as a suffix ~阁下 after a title or a name.
前輩	前辈	qiánbèi	Of an older generation.	You	Neutral	Contemporary and Classical	Used when addressing an elder or someone in the same profession who is more senior than the speaker. Can be used as a suffix ~前辈 after a title or a name.
台端	台端	táiduān	(See notes)	You	Neutral	Contemporary and Classical	"台" refers to the Three Ducal Ministers, the three highest-ranked officials in the Zhou dynasty. "端" is the honorific for assisting and advisory officials in the Six Dynasties. It is usually used in formal writing when addressing a person of similar social status.
仁兄	仁兄	rénxiōng	Kind elder friend	You	Male	Contemporary and Classical	Used when addressing an older male friend.
尊駕	尊驾	zūnjià	The respected procession	You	Neutral	Contemporary and Classical	Used when referring to a guest or a person of higher social status.
同志	同志	tóngzhì	Same ambition/goal	Comrade	Neutral	Contemporary	Literally means "you, who share the same ambition with me". Used by members of the Nationalist and Communist parties to address fellow members of the same conviction, thus it can translate to "comrade". It is also used by some older citizens in China to address others ranging from strangers to spouses. However, now among the younger and more urban Chinese, "同志" has definite implications of homosexuality (not necessarily in a pejorative way, however, as it has been adopted by the gay community, and thus is more analogous to the English term queer as compared to faggot).
節下	节下	jiéxià	Beneath your ceremonial banner	Your Excellency	Neutral	Classical	Used when addressing ambassadors from foreign lands.
賢家	贤家	xiánjiā	The virtuous house	You	Neutral	Classical	贤~ prefix
賢郎	贤郎	xiánláng	Virtuous young man	You	Male	Classical	Referring to one's son. 贤~ prefix
賢弟	贤弟	xiándì	Virtuous younger brother	You	Male	Classical	Could be either addressing one's own younger brother or referring to the addressee's younger brother. 贤~ prefix
仁公	仁公	réngōng	Kind lord	You	Male	Classical	Used when addressing a person more senior than the speaker.

==== Family members ====
The following are used between family members. Also see Familial Honorifics section below.

Traditional Chinese	Simplified Chinese	Pinyin	Literal Meaning	Meaning in Usage	Gender	Contemporary or Classical Usage	Notes
愛~	爱~	ài	Beloved	Beloved	Neutral	Contemporary and Classical	A prefix to show affection for lovers. Examples: 愛妻 (my beloved wife); 愛姬 (my beloved concubine); 愛妾 (my beloved concubine); 愛郎 (my beloved man/husband) etc. 愛人 (my beloved person) is a contemporary informal usage for "spouse" in mainland China. It's not used as 2nd person pronoun.
夫人	夫人	fūrén	Wife / Lady	You	Male	Contemporary and Classical	Means "you" when talking directly to wife. When introducing her to others it means "my wife". Contemporary in 3rd person only.
家~	家~	jiā	Home~	You, my~	Neutral	Contemporary and Classical	A prefix used when addressing elder family members in some contemporary dialects: 家姐，家嫂 Sometimes 长~ is used: 长兄，长姐
賢妻	贤妻	xiánqī	Virtuous wife	You	Female	Classical	贤~ prefix
賢弟	贤弟	xiándì	Virtuous younger brother	You	Male	Classical	"Xiandi" (贤棣; 賢棣; xiándì) is another less commonly used form. 贤~ prefix.
賢侄	贤侄	xiánzhì	Virtuous nephew	You	Male	Classical	贤~ prefix
夫君	夫君	fūjūn	Husband	You	Male	Classical	
郎君	郎君	lángjūn	Husband	You	Male	Classical	
官人	官人	guānrén	Husband / Man	You	Male	Classical	
相公	相公	xiànggōng	Husband	You	Male	Classical	It now refers to a male prostitute in some circles.
仁兄	仁兄	rénxiōng	Kind elder brother	You	Male	Classical	Contemporary use not as second person pronoun, but more as a respectful honorific for an older friend. Also 兄长

=== Second- and third-person possessive ===
Similarly, the possessive case "your" is avoided. This is often achieved by the honorific prefixes 令~, 尊~, 贤~, 贵~ as described below.

==== Referring to addressee's family ====
The following honorifics are used to show respect when referencing the addressee's family members.

Traditional Chinese	Simplified Chinese	Pinyin	Literal Meaning	Meaning in Usage	Gender	Contemporary or Classical Usage	Notes
令尊	令尊	lìngzūn	The beautiful and respected one	Your father	Male	Contemporary and Classical	"Lingzunweng" (令尊翁; lìngzūnwēng) is sometimes used. Also 令严.
令堂	令堂	lìngtáng	The beautiful and dignified hall.	Your mother	Female	Contemporary and Classical	"Lingshoutang" (令寿堂; 令壽堂; lìngshòutáng) is sometimes used. Also 令慈.
令閫	令阃	lìngkǔn	The beautiful door to the woman's room	Your wife	Female	Contemporary and Classical	
令兄	令兄	lìngxiōng	The beautiful elder brother	Your elder brother	Male	Contemporary and Classical	
令郎	令郎	lìngláng	The beautiful young man	Your son	Male	Contemporary and Classical	"Linggongzi" (令公子; lìnggōngzǐ) is sometimes used.
令愛	令爱	lìng'ài	The beautiful and beloved one	Your daughter	Female	Contemporary and Classical	Another form of "ling'ai" (令嫒; 令嬡; lìng'ài) is sometimes used.
令千金	令千金	lìngqiānjīn	The beautiful one who is worth a thousand gold	Your daughter	Female	Contemporary and Classical	
高堂	高堂	gāotáng	The highly respected hall.	Your parents	Neutral	Contemporary and Classical	
尊上	尊上	zūnshàng	The respected one above	Your parents	Male	Classical	
尊公	尊公	zūngōng	The respected lord	Your father	Male	Classical	"Zunjun" (尊君; zūnjūn) and "zunfu" (尊府; zūnfǔ) are sometimes used.
尊堂	尊堂	zūntáng	The respected and dignified one	Your mother	Female	Classical	
尊親	尊亲	zūnqīn	The respected and loved ones	Your parents	Neutral	Classical	
尊夫人	尊夫人	zūnfūrén	The respected wife	Your wife	Female	Contemporary and Classical	
賢喬梓	贤乔梓	xiánqiáozǐ	The virtuous father and son (archaic)	You (father and son)	Male	Classical	
賢伉儷	贤伉俪	xiánkànglì	The virtuous husband and wife (archaic)	You (husband and wife)	Neutral	Classical	
賢昆仲	贤昆仲	xiánkūnzhòng	The virtuous brothers (archaic)	You (brothers)	Male	Classical	
賢昆玉	贤昆玉	xiánkūnyù	The virtuous Mt. Kunlun jade	You (brothers)	Male	Classical	
冰翁	冰翁	bīngwēng	Ice old man	Wife's father	Male	Classical	Sometimes 泰山 is used.
貴子弟	贵子弟	guìzǐdì	Honorable sons	Your son(s)	Male	Contemporary and Classical	Usually when addressing strangers or less known people
貴子女	贵子女	guìzǐnǚ	Honorable children	Your children	Neutral	Contemporary and Classical	Usually when addressing strangers or less known people
貴家長	贵家长	guìjiāzhǎng	Honorable parents	Your parent(s)	Neutral	Contemporary	Usually when addressing strangers or less known people
貴夫人	贵夫人	guìfūrén	Honorable wife	Your wife	Female	Contemporary and Classical	Usually when addressing strangers or less known people
貴丈夫	贵丈夫	guìzhàngfū	Honorable husband	Your husband	Male	Contemporary and Classical	Usually when addressing strangers or less known people

==== Social relationships ====
The honorific prefixes 贵~ and 宝~ are often used.

Traditional Chinese	Simplified Chinese	Pinyin	Literal Meaning	Meaning in Usage	Gender	Contemporary or Classical Usage	Notes
貴~	贵~	guì	Honorable	~	Neutral	Contemporary and Classical	A prefix for persons and other things affiliated to the addressee. It is used for the purposes of courtesy and formality. Other examples: 貴體 (your body/health), 貴恙 (your sickness), 貴幹 (your concern/business)
貴公司	贵公司	guìgōngsī	Honorable company	Your company		Contemporary	
貴國	贵国	guìguó	Honorable country	Your country		Contemporary and Classical	
貴姓	贵姓	guìxìng	Honorable surname	Your surname / family name		Contemporary	Used when asking for the addressee's surname or family name.
貴庚	贵庚	guìgēng	Honorable age	Your age		Contemporary and Classical	Used when asking for the addressee's age.
寶~	宝~	bǎo	Valuable	~	Neutral	Contemporary and Classical	A prefix that means "valuable" or "precious".
貴寶號	贵宝号	guìbǎohào	Valuable Banner	Your valuable business		Contemporary and Classical	
貴府	贵府	guìfǔ	Noble residence	Your home		Classical	
府上	府上	fǔshàng	Stately residence	Your home		Classical	
先賢	先贤	xiānxián	The late virtuous	The late virtuous	Neutral	Classical	Referring to a deceased person who was highly regarded.

=== Honorific titles ===
Often, the addressee's profession or title (or as a suffix after their name) is used as an honorific form of address. Below are some common titles.

Traditional Chinese	Simplified Chinese	Pinyin	Meaning	Gender	Contemporary or Classical Usage	Notes
先生	先生	xiānshēng	Mr.	Male	Contemporary and Classical	Historically carrying the meaning of "teacher". Used for all men in contemporary society.
小姐 / 姑娘	小姐 / 姑娘	xiǎojiě / gūniang	Miss	Female	Contemporary and Classical	The use of standalone "xiaojie" is taboo in some parts of China as it may refer to prostitutes. In Suzhou, "xiaojie" is substituted with "yatou" (丫头; 丫頭; yātou), which in turn may be considered offensive in other parts of China because "yatou" also means "dumb girl".
女士	女士	nǚshì	Ms.	Female	Contemporary	Marriage status-agnostic address for adult women, for use with their maiden name. (See Chinese surname#Usage on maiden name retention.)
夫人	夫人	fūrén	Mrs., Madam, Lady	Female	Contemporary and Classical	Traditionally, the honorific of the consort of a Pre-Qin state ruler. During the imperial era, it was appropriated for vassals. In modern use, when a surname is used, the husband's surname precedes this honorific. It is appropriate for any married woman, or as a sign of respect for foreign women holding certain high positions (e.g. Margaret Thatcher 撒切尔夫人, First Lady 第一夫人, Marie Curie 居里夫人).
孺人	孺人	rúrén	Madam	Female	Classical	An old title for wives of some government officials or important people.
公子	公子	gōngzǐ	Mr.	Male	Classical	Old title for young males.
博士	博士	bóshì	Dr.	Neutral	Contemporary	Originally a court scholar. Refers to a Doctor of Philosophy (PhD) holder.
醫生	医生	yīshēng	Dr.	Neutral	Contemporary	Refers to a medical doctor. "Daifu" (大夫; dàifū) "Yishi" (醫師; yīshī) are sometimes used, usually in mainland China and in Taiwan respectively.
經理	经理	jīnglǐ	Manager	Neutral	Contemporary	
老師	老师	lǎoshī	Teacher	Neutral	Contemporary and Classical	"Laoshi" may sometimes be used as a polite reference to a more highly educated person, who may not necessarily be a teacher.
師父	师父	shīfù	Master	Neutral	Contemporary and Classical	See Sifu for further information.
師傅	师傅	shīfù	Master	Neutral	Contemporary and Classical	See Sifu for further information.
修士	修士	xiūshì	Monk (Catholic)	Male	Contemporary	
神父	神父	shénfù	Priest (Catholic); Father	Male	Contemporary	
教宗	教宗	jiàozōng	The Pope (Catholic)	Male	Contemporary	
執士	执士	zhíshì	Deacon (Christian)	Male	Contemporary	
牧師	牧师	mùshī	Pastor (Christian)	Neutral	Contemporary	
主教	主教	zhǔjiào	Bishop (Christian)	Neutral	Contemporary	
法師	法师	fǎshī	Monk / Nun (Buddhist)	Neutral	Contemporary and Classical	"Heshang" (和尚; héshàng) is also used, either to denote seniority or hierarchy in the monastery.
居士	居士	jūshì	Layman (Buddhist)	Neutral	Contemporary and Classical	
道長	道长	dàozhǎng	Priest / Priestess (Taoist)	Neutral	Contemporary and Classical	
爵士	爵士	juéshì	Sir (Knighthood)	Male	Contemporary	
仙姑	仙姑	xiāngū	Priestess (Taoist)	Female	Classical	"Daogu" (道姑; dàogū) is also used sometimes.
大夫	大夫	dàifu	Dr.	Neutral	Classical	

== Honorific modifiers ==
=== Noun and proper noun complements ===
Below is a list of common honorific prefixes and suffixes used with nouns and proper nouns to show intimacy, humility, honor, or respect. Some may have shown up in pronoun discussions. While noun modifiers are technically adjectives, honorific prefixes/suffixes are different from normal adjectives in that they become part of the noun in usage, and the meaning of the modifying prefix/suffix is usually not taken literally - only added functionally to show respect or humility. Because Chinese words are usually formed also by combining multiple root characters (each with a literal meaning), it is not always immediately apparent when using a polite version of a word that an honorific modifier is in use.

Traditional Chinese	Simplified Chinese	Pinyin	Literal Meaning	Contemporary or Classical Usage	Notes
阿~	阿~	ā	(see notes)	Contemporary and Classical	A prefix that shows affection or intimacy. Examples: 阿伯 (uncle); 阿妹 (sister); 阿哥 (brother); 阿爸 (father) etc. It may also be attached to the last character of a person's given name to address him/her intimately. Examples: 阿莲. More common in southern parts of China.
本~	本~	běn	This / Our	Contemporary and Classical	A prefix for things affiliated to oneself. Examples: 本公司 (this company / our company); 本校 (this school / our school) etc.
敝~	敝~	bì	Unkempt/ragged	Contemporary and Classical	A prefix for things affiliated to oneself. Examples: 敝公司 (this company / our company); 敝校 (this school / our school) etc.
為~	为~	wéi	As (your)	Classical	Examples: 為父 (I, your father); 為母 (I, your mother); 為兄 (I, your elder brother), 為師 (I, your teacher) etc.
愚~	愚~	yú	Unintelligent	Classical	Humble prefix: 愚兄 (this unintelligent senior brother/friend of yours), 愚见 (my unintelligent opinion)
鄙~	鄙~	bǐrén	Lowly/unlearned	Classical	Humble prefix: 鄙意 (my humble intent), 鄙见 (my humble opinion)
奴~	奴~	nú	Slave	Classical	Prefix for servants and slaves. Examples: 奴才，奴婢，奴家
~君	~君	jūn	Man	Classical	A suffix used for a male friend or a respected person.
~姬	~姬	jī	Woman	Classical	A suffix used for a female friend, maiden. "Guniang" (姑娘; gūniang) is sometimes used.
~郎	~郎	láng	Man	Contemporary and Classical	A suffix used for an intimate male friend or one's husband.
~子	~子	zǐ	Learned man	Classical	A suffix used for a wise or learned man. "Fuzi" (夫子; fūzǐ) is sometimes used.
小~	小~	xiǎo	Small, insignificant	Contemporary and Classical	Minimizes significance of oneself. Examples: 小人，小生，小女，小妾, 小店 Used often with personal surnames in contemporary Chinese: 小张，小明 as a diminutive. Related to usage of ~儿 in classical usage.
大~	大~	dà	big	Contemporary and Classical	Maximizes significance of something. Examples: 大名, 大慶, 大作, 大禮
~兄	~兄	xiōng	Brother	Contemporary and Classical	A suffix used for an older male friend. Also ~兄弟
~公	~公	gōng	Lord	Contemporary and Classical	A suffix used for a respected person.
~足下	~足下	zúxià	Beneath the feet	Classical	A suffix for a friend in writing a letter.
~先生	~先生	xiānshēng	Mr.	Contemporary and Classical	A suffix used for a person in a profession.
~前輩	~前辈	qiánbeì	Earlier Generation	Contemporary and Classical	A suffix used for an elder or a more senior person in the same profession as the speaker.
~大人	~大人	dàrén	Sir / Madam	Contemporary and Classical	A suffix used for an official or a person in authority.
~氏	~氏	shì	Surnamed	Classical	A suffix used after a surname to address someone not of personal acquaintance.
~兒	~儿	ér	Son / child	Classical	A suffix used for a young person.
~哥	~哥	gē	Elder brother	Contemporary and Classical	A suffix used for an older male friend or relative who is the same 辈分beìfèn (i.e., 平辈). Also ~大哥， ~大哥哥，~小哥哥
~弟	~弟	dì	Younger brother	Contemporary and Classical	A suffix used for a younger male friend or relative who is the same 辈分beìfèn (i.e., 平辈). Also ~小弟，~小弟弟，~小老弟
~姐	~姐	jiě	Elder sister	Contemporary and Classical	A suffix used for an older female friend or relative who is the same 辈分beìfèn (i.e., 平辈). Also ~大姐，大姐姐，~小姐姐
~妹	~妹	mèi	Younger sister	Contemporary and Classical	A suffix used for a younger female friend or relative who is the same 辈分beìfèn (i.e., 平辈). Also ~小妹，~小妹妹，~妹子，~小妹子
~姨	~姨	yí	aunt	Contemporary and Classical	A suffix used for an older female or relative +1 辈分beìfèn above self (i.e., 长辈). Also ~阿姨，~姑姑，~姑
~叔	~叔	shū	uncle	Contemporary and Classical	A suffix used for an older male or relative +1 辈分beìfèn above self (i.e., 长辈). Also ~叔叔, ~大叔
~伯	~伯	bó	grandpa	Contemporary and Classical	A suffix used for an older male or relative 2+ 辈分beìfèn above self or much older than self (i.e., 长辈). Also ~阿伯，~伯伯, ~阿公
~婆	~婆	pó	grandma	Contemporary and Classical	A suffix used for an older female or relative 2+ 辈分beìfèn above self or much older than self (i.e., 长辈). Also ~阿婆, ~婆婆，~嬷嬷，~奶奶
老~	老~	lǎo	old	Contemporary and Classical	An honorific prefix for people one respects. Examples: 老总，老张，老兄，老弟，老婆，老公，老伯. Sometimes used as a suffix.
~總	~总	zǒng	chief	Contemporary	An honorific suffix for people who lead an important position. Examples: 周总，张总。 Also: ~董 (from 董事长) 周董，张董
聖~	圣~	shèng	St. / Sage / Emperor	Contemporary and Classical	Used as a prefix to indicate holiness. May not necessarily be applied to only Catholic saints as a prefix, for example "孔圣" (Kongsheng) (孔聖; kǒngshèng), literally means "Saint Confucius" or "Sage Confucius". Also used for things related to the emperor, for example: 圣宠 (emperor's love), 圣
龍~	龙~	lóng	Dragon	Classical	Prefix for things related to the emperor, for example: 龙体 (Lit. The Dragon's Body—His majesty's health), 龍體欠安 (the Emperor is not feeling well)， 龍體無恙 (the Emperor is well) etc. 龙颜 (Lit. The Dragon's Face—His majesty's mood/feeling), 龍顏大悅 (the Emperor is very pleased); 龍顏大怒 (the Emperor is furious) etc.
鳳~	凤~	fèng	Phoenix	Classical	Similar to 龍， used for queens and empresses etc.
丈~	丈~	zhàng	Elder	Contemporary and Classical	Examples: 丈人，丈母娘
太~ / 大~	太~ / 大~	tài / dà	Elder	Contemporary and Classical	Examples: 太后 (Empress Dowager)，太父(grandfather)，太母/大母(grandmother)
薄~	薄~	bó	thin / insignificant	Contemporary and Classical	Humble prefix used in reference to items belong to self. Examples: 薄技, 薄酒, 薄礼, 薄面
拙~	拙~	zhuō	clumsy	Contemporary and Classical	Humble prefix used in reference to one's skill and idea. Examples: 拙笔, 拙见, 拙著, 拙荆
浅~	浅~	qiǎn	shallow	Contemporary and Classical	Example: 浅见，浅识，浅学，浅职，浅知，浅说，浅闻
屈~	屈~	qū	to bend	Contemporary and Classical	Examples: 屈驾、屈尊、屈身、屈己、屈膝
雅~	雅~	yǎ	elegant	Contemporary and Classical	Examples: 雅教、雅量、雅兴、雅意、雅致
芳~	芳~	fāng	fragrant, beautiful, wonderful	Contemporary and Classical	Examples: 芳邻, 芳龄, 芳名, 芳华
華~	华~	huá	beautiful	Contemporary and Classical	Examples: 华诞、华翰、华堂、华宗
令~	令~	lìng	beautiful	Contemporary and Classical	Examples: 令尊、令堂、令郎、令爱、令嫒、令兄、令弟、令婿、令侄
玉~	玉~	yù	jade	Contemporary and Classical	Beautifying prefix for one's body to one's pictures. Examples: 玉成、玉音、玉体、玉照
高~	高~	gāo	tall / high	Contemporary and Classical	Prefix that adds a "highly regarded", "highly above" connotation. Examples: 高见、高就、高龄、高论、高寿、高足
~下	~下	xià	beneath	Contemporary and Classical	Example: 殿下、阁下、麾下、膝下、足下。
台~	台~	tái	(derived from constellations)	Contemporary and Classical	Derived from Chinese constellation 三台星官. Examples: 台驾, 台甫, 台鉴, 台端 related to 兄台

=== Verb complements ===
Similar to nouns, verbs can be complemented with honorific prefixes to form more polite versions. Below are some examples.

Traditional Chinese	Simplified Chinese	Pinyin	Literal Meaning	Contemporary or Classical Usage	Notes
請~	请~	qǐng	to request	Contemporary and Classical	An honorific prefix when inviting another person to do something. Examples: 请教，请问
惠~	惠~	huì	to gift	Contemporary and Classical	An honorific prefix when requesting a gifting action from another person. Examples: 惠存, 惠临，惠顾，惠赠，惠允
拜~	拜~	bài	to bow	Contemporary and Classical	An honorific prefix when one's action may involve or impact the other person. Examples: 拜访，拜读，拜服，拜贺，拜托，拜望
賜~	赐~	cì	to bestow	Contemporary and Classical	An honorific prefix when requesting a gifting action from another person. Examples: 赐教，赐恩，赐复，赐见
奉~	奉~	fèng	to offer	Contemporary and Classical	An honorific prefix when one's action may impact the other person. Examples: 奉告, 奉还, 奉陪, 奉劝, 奉送
恭~	恭~	gōng	to look forward	Contemporary and Classical	An honorific prefix when one's action is out of due respect. Examples: 恭贺, 恭候, 恭请，恭迎
垂~	垂~	chuí	to hang down	Contemporary and Classical	An honorific prefix when one's receiving an honorable action from another person. Examples: 垂爱，垂青，垂问，垂念
敢~	敢~	gǎn	to dare	Contemporary and Classical	An honorific prefix when one's making a potentially inappropriate request. Examples: 敢问，敢请，敢劳，敢烦
劳~	劳~	láo	to labor	Contemporary and Classical	An honorific prefix when one's requesting an action that could trouble the other person. Examples: 劳驾，劳烦，劳步，劳神
謹~	谨~	jǐn	to use care	Contemporary and Classical	An honorific prefix when one's requesting an action be performed with care, often used in letters. Examples: 谨启,，谨复，谨言，谨肃，谨禀
見~	见~	jiàn	to see	Contemporary and Classical	An honorific prefix when inviting someone to do something to oneself. Examples: 见谅，见笑，见教
榮~	荣~	róng	gloriously	Contemporary and Classical	An honorific prefix for an achieving action. Examples: 荣升，荣获，荣立，荣任
忝~	忝~	tiǎn	to shame	Classical	Humble prefix used to indicate shamefulness or feeling of undeserving. Examples: 忝列, 忝在, 忝任
敬~	敬~	jìng	to respect	Contemporary and Classical	Adds a sense of respect. Examples: 敬告、敬贺、敬候、敬请、敬佩、敬谢
屈~	屈~	qū	to bend	Contemporary and Classical	Implies feeling bad about making or seeing someone endure some hardship or difficult situation. Examples: 屈就、屈居
俯~	俯~	fǔ	to look down	Classical	Often used in letters to request someone to do something to oneself—implies a self-deprecating lower position. Example: 俯察, 俯就, 俯念, 俯允
光~	光~	guāng	to lighten	Contemporary and Classical	Implies someone's action brings honor to oneself. Examples: 光顾、光临
過~	过~	guò	to surpass	Contemporary and Classical	Implies one is not worthy of a praising action. Examples: 过奖、过誉
叨~	叨~	tāo	to benefit from	Classical	Examples: 叨光、叨教、叨扰
鈞~	钧~	jūn	(a weight unit)	Classical	Prefix for when requesting actions from a superior, often in writing. Examples: 鈞座, 鈞裁, 鈞簽, 鈞啟
呈~	呈~	chéng	to show	Classical	Examples: 呈正，呈报，呈请
進~	进~	jìn	to advance	Contemporary and Classical	Examples: 进见，进言—honorifics for going to see someone and going to present something

== Other honorifics ==
There are innumerable words (nouns, verbs, adjectives, adverbs) in the Chinese language with specific humble, respectful, or beautifying honorific connotations, in addition to the base meaning of the word. It is not possible to catalog them all, but some additional examples are provided in this section. These words are often used in lieu of a bland, neutral, or deprecating alternative to show deference, respect, or elegance. Just like with Chinese 成语 (chéngyǔ, "canned phrases/idioms"), it is often difficult to translate these words into English or another language, because it would require an elaborate explanation of the meaning, metaphors, and nuances captured succinctly in the Chinese honorific equivalent.

=== Respectful language ===
Additional 敬辞(jìngcí) examples:

- 衛冕 verb: honorific to describe when someone is able to retain first ranking in a competition
- 駕臨 verb: honorific that describes someone's visit, e.g., 恭候大驾光临
- 名諱 noun: respectful version of the word "name", used with names of respected people
- 璧謝 verb: honorific for returning a gift and offering thanks
- 斧正 verb: used to ask someone to correct one's writing
- 借重 verb: leverage someone else's ability to help oneself
- 鼻祖 noun: honorific for pioneers in a field
- 高足 noun: honorific for someone's disciple
- 鼎力 adverb: indicate to someone they have your full support

=== Humble language ===
Additional 谦辞(qiāncí) examples:

- 承乏 verb: humble word indicating you took a position only because it hasn't been filled by someone more qualified yet
- 綿薄 adjective: humble word to describe the help you offer someone
- 陋见, 浅见 noun: humble way to describe one's opinion
- 错爱 noun: humble way to describe how someone has been taking care of oneself. e.g., 承蒙错爱
- 刍议 noun: self-deprecating description of one's words
- 斗胆 adjective: self-deprecating descriptor used as a warning when someone is about to do or say something out of line/expectation, unreasonable, or out of the norm
- 聊供补壁: Lit. offer a painting that's only worthy of being used to patch your walls—humble way to gift a painting
- 涂鸦 verb: humble way to describe one's painting skill. (Lit. like a child's spilled ink looking like a crow “忽来案上翻墨汁，涂抹诗书如老鸦")
- 急就章 noun: humble way to describe one-self's work was completed in haste and lacks thought

=== Indirect language ===
Additional 婉辞(wǎncí) examples:

- 作古、歸天、歸西、魂游地府、永眠、長眠、含笑九泉、無常、仙逝: Lit. became ancient, returned to heaven, soul wandered to the underworld, eternal sleep, entered Nine Springs with a smile, heavenly exit, etc. -- various expressions to describe someone's passing
- 掛花、掛彩: Lit. hang the flowers / hang the decors -- gun shot wound
- 升遐、驾崩、崩殂、大行: Lit. risen to faraway land / procession broken etc. -- various expressions for a king or emperor's death (classical usage)
- 坐化、圓寂、涅盤: Lit. changed/ascended while seated, attained perfection eliminated impurity, Nirvāṇa, etc—death of a monk/nun
- 乞骸骨: Lit. beg for the skeleton—retirement request for old government officials (classical usage)
- 見背: Lit. see back --- death of family elders (classical usage)
- 頓首: Lit. to stamp the ground with head—kowtow (used in letters; classical usage)
- 千古: Lit. lasts a thousand years—in remembrance of the dead
- 冤家: Lit. destined/mortal enemies—lovers
- 棄養: Lit. given up to raise—parents died (classical usage)
- 抱恙: Lit. holding ailments—sick
- 龙体违和: Lit. dragon's body broke harmony—the king is sick (classical usage)
- 薄命: Lit. thin life—died young
- 百年归老: Lit. return to old place at 100 years—used when talking about people's eventual death through aging

=== Courteous language ===
Additional 客套语(kètàoyǔ) examples:

- 勞駕：Lit. to labor your procession - used when asking someone for a favor / trouble someone for something
- 包涵：Lit. to contain [my mistakes] - used when asking someone for forgiveness.
- 借光：Lit. borrow light - used to mean benefited by association to another person; now it can mean excuse me.
- 賜教：Lit. bestow teaching upon - when asking someone to teach you something (from the other's perspective)
- 领教: Lit. receive teaching - when asking someone to teach you something (from own perspective)
- 久違：Lit. long time apart - said courteously when you haven't seen someone in a long time
- 久仰：Lit. admired for a long time - said courteously when meeting someone you've heard of
- 托福：Lit. by your fortune - a thankful expression indicating one's attainment/accomplishment of something is due to another person
- 赏脸：Lit. give face - used when asking someone to be a guest
- 关照: Lit. port / gate visa - when asking someone to look after you / your business
- 不吝指教：Lit. not be stingy about passing knowledge - used when asking someone to teach something
- 恕不遠送：Lit. forgive me for not walking/accompanying you far - used when the host is sending their guests away
- 洗耳恭聽：Lit. cleaned ears to listen - prepared to listen attentively to you
- 不足掛齒：Lit. not enough to hang on your teeth - often used to humbly minimize the significance of one's help towards others
- 借花獻佛：Lit. borrow flower to gift to Buddha - often used to describe one's merely re-gifting a gift; implies no need to put too much significance on the gift

=== Elegant language ===
Additional 雅语(yáyǔ) examples:

- 金蘭: Lit. gold orchid - used to describe sworn/god-brothers and sworn/god-sisters; metaphor implies the tight bond between sworn brothers/sisters is like a sharp sword able to break gold, and their aligned speech/opinion is fragrant to the senses like orchid.
- 芳名: Lit. fragrant / beautiful name - elegant alternative for the word "name" for a young female
- 千秋: Lit. thousand Autumns - elegant word for birthday
- 请留步: Lit. please stay your steps - used to tell someone they don't need to accompany you further (e.g., guests tell host upon leaving)
- 请用膳: Lit. please use meal - used to tell patrons or guests to eat
- 小便: Lit. little convenience - to take a leak
- 大便: Lit. big convenience - to take a dump
- 耳目一新: Lit. ears and eyes refreshed - describes encountering something new and interesting

别(bié) "to separate": elegant ways to describe various types of separations (i.e., bidding farewell) using the word 别. The sense of elegance / beauty for these words is not translatable, so they are not translated here.

- 告别, 握别, 揖别, 挥别, 吻别, 拜别, 饯别, 谢别, 赠别, 留别, 送别, 抛别, 惜别, 恋别, 阔别, 长别, 永别, 诀别

笔(bǐ) "brush / pen": elegant ways to describe various situations related to writing/painting, literature and work of art using the word 笔 as a metaphor.

- 动笔, 命笔, 逸笔, 辍笔, 赘笔, 亲笔, 谨笔, 代笔, 草笔, 文笔, 御笔, 随笔, 闲笔, 余笔, 工笔, 润笔, 歪笔, 执笔, 妙笔, 练笔, 伏笔

== Familial honorifics ==
Some familial honorifics and examples were described in the sections above. This section consolidates the common contemporary familial prefixes and suffixes; some usages may be regional. Also see article on Chinese Kinship.

Addressing own family members:

老(lǎo)~: elders / intimacy

- Elderly: 老爷, 老爷子, 老奶奶; these are less used
- Parents: 老爸, 老妈, 老头(儿); the suffix ~子 is used in some regions of China: 老头子，老妈子
- Husband and wife: 老公, 老婆

阿(ā)~: intimacy

- Grandparents: 阿公，阿婆，阿嫲
- Parents: 阿爸，阿妈
- Siblings: 阿哥，阿姐，阿妹; note: 阿弟 is less used

大(dà)~: usually reserved for the eldest sibling and eldest uncle/aunt; In classical Chinese 长(zhǎng)~ was also used: 长兄，长嫂，长姐 etc.

- Uncles and aunts: 大伯(父)，大姨(妈)，大姑母(妈)
- Wife of elder brother: 大嫂
- Elder siblings: 大哥，大姐

小(xiǎo)~: diminutive for youngsters

- Youngsters in the family: 小明，小芳; In classical Chinese the ~儿(ér) suffix was used: 明儿，芳儿
- Younger sister: 小妹; note: 小弟 is usually not used towards own family member

家(jiā)~: regional usage

- Elder sister: 家姐 (Cantonese)
- Sister in law: 家嫂 (Cantonese)

Referring to own family members in front of others:

家(jiā)~: less used in contemporary speech; used more in formal writing.

- My grandfather: 家祖父
- My grandmother: 家祖母
- My father: 家父，家严
- My mother: 家母，家慈
- My uncle: 家叔, 家舅
- My elder brother: 家兄
- My elder sister: 家姐

舍(shè)~: mostly only used in formal writing now.

- My relative: 舍亲
- My younger brother: 舍弟
- My younger sister: 舍妹
- My nephew: 舍侄; rare

Referring to another person's family members:

令(lìng)~: less used in contemporary speech; used more in formal writing

- Your relative: 令亲
- Your father: 令尊(翁) (still popular)，令严
- Your mother: 令(寿)堂 (still popular)，令慈
- Your siblings: 令兄，令弟，令妹; 令姐 is not used
- Your wife: 令夫人
- Your son: 令郎，令公子 (still popular)
- Your daughter: 令爱/嫒，令千金 (still popular)

贵(guì)~: used in social correspondence; sometimes in speech for formality

- Your children: 贵子弟，贵子女
- Your parents: 贵家长
- Your wife: 贵夫人
- Your husband: 贵丈夫；rare

尊(zūn)~: mostly obsolete in speech as a familial honorific prefix

- Your wife: 尊夫人; sometimes in speech for formality

== Salutations ==
Salutation is used at the beginning of a speech or a letter to address the audience or recipient(s). Below are a few examples in contemporary Chinese:

- 親愛的(qīn'aìde) / 亲爱的(qīn'aìde): Dear (beloved)
- 尊敬的(zūnjìngde): Revered
- 敬愛的(jìng'aìde) / 敬爱的 (jìng'aìde): Dear esteemed
- 尊貴的(zūnguìde) / 尊贵的(zūnguìde): Dear exalted / dignified

== Honorifics in letters and official documents ==
Chinese letter writing, especially in Classical Chinese, employs a highly complex system of unique honorifics and honorific rule sets.

== See also ==
- Chinese titles
- Chinese pronouns
- Chinese kinship
- Chinese idioms
